= 2016 LEB Oro playoffs =

The 2016 LEB Oro playoffs is the final stage of the 2015–16 LEB Oro season. They will start on 22 April 2016, and will finish on 31 May.

The quarterfinals will be played in a best-of-3 games format, while the semifinals and the finals in a best-of-5 games format. The best seeded team plays at home the games 1, 2 and 5 if necessary. The winner of the finals will promote to the 2016–17 ACB season with Quesos Cerrato Palencia, the champion of the regular season.

== Bracket ==
Quarterfinals (22, 24, 29 April, 1, 3 May)
2	Club Melilla Baloncesto	72	73	88	X	X
9	Cáceres Patrimonio de la Humanidad	55	71	82	X	X
5	Leyma Básquet Coruña	90	85	76	83	99
6	Cafés Candelas Breogán	86	90	75	90	63
3	San Pablo Inmobiliaria Burgos	73	81	67	65	74
8	Ourense Provincia Termal	72	64	85	91	61
4	Unión Financiera Baloncesto Oviedo	55	67	85	67	X
7	Peñas Huesca	74	72	76	85	X

Semifinals (6, 8, 13, 15, 17 May)
2	Club Melilla Baloncesto	101	97	71	81	88
5	Leyma Básquet Coruña	83	99	82	61	82
3	San Pablo Inmobiliaria Burgos	78	66	71	72	X
7	Peñas Huesca	76	78	83	83	X

Finals (20, 22, 27, 29, 31 May)
2	Club Melilla Baloncesto	86	91	93	X	X
7	Peñas Huesca	81	64	86	X	X

== Quarterfinals ==
=== Club Melilla Baloncesto v Cáceres Patrimonio de la Humanidad ===
22 April 2016	Club Melilla Baloncesto	72–55	Cáceres Patrimonio de la Humanidad	Melilla
21:00	Scoring by quarter: 14–15, 15–11, 22–9, 21–20
	Pts: Franch 12; Rebs: Manzano 9 Asts: E. Almazán 4 PIR: Franch 12	Boxscore	Pts: Pérez 13; Rebs: Thomas 7 Asts: Marco 4 PIR: Marco 14	Arena: Pabellón Javier Imbroda Ortiz; Referees: Vázquez García, Zamora Rodríguez

24 April 2016	Club Melilla Baloncesto	73–71(OT)	Cáceres Patrimonio de la Humanidad	Melilla
18:00	Scoring by quarter: 13–14, 16–16, 12–19, 24–16, Overtime: 8–6
	Pts: Gatell 18; Rebs: three players 7 Asts: Suka-Umu 6 PIR: Gatell 23	Boxscore	Pts: Pérez 12; Rebs: Pérez 8 Asts: Frutos 6 PIR: Pérez 20	Arena: Pabellón Javier Imbroda Ortiz; Referees: Carpallo Miguélez, Gómez López

29 April 2016	Cáceres Patrimonio de la Humanidad	82–88(OT)	Club Melilla Baloncesto	Cáceres
21:00	Scoring by quarter: 22–22, 18–13, 11–17, 20–19, Overtime: 11–17
	Pts: Thomas 24; Rebs: Jakstas, Marco 6 Asts: Corrales 5 PIR: Marco 19	Boxscore	Pts: Walton 17; Rebs: Walton 9 Asts: Suka-Umu 9 PIR: Walton 27	Arena: Multiusos Ciudad de Cáceres; Referees: Pinela García, Zafra Guerra

=== San Pablo Inmobiliaria Burgos v Ourense Provincia Termal ===
22 April 2016	San Pablo Inmobiliaria Burgos	73–72	Ourense Provincia Termal	Burgos
21:00	Scoring by quarter: 19–22, 22–22, 16–11, 16–17
	Pts: Huertas, Maresch 11; Rebs: three players 5 Asts: Poščić 3 PIR: Fornas 16	Boxscore	Pts: Kapelan 18; Rebs: Salash 5 Asts: Zamora 3 PIR: Kapelan 17	Arena: Polideportivo El Plantío; Referees: Morales Ruiz, Mendoza Holgado

24 April 2016	San Pablo Inmobiliaria Burgos	81–64	Ourense Provincia Termal	Burgos
19:15	Scoring by quarter: 19–10, 16–24, 24–11, 22–19
	Pts: Fornas, Martínez 12; Rebs: Poščić, Tončinić 9 Asts: Vilanova 6 PIR: Vega 15	Boxscore	Pts: Zamora 16; Rebs: Rowley 10; Asts: Rowley, Rejón 2 PIR: Rejón 15	Arena: Polideportivo El Plantío; Referees: Torres Sánchez, Sánchez Sixto

28 April 2016	Ourense Provincia Termal	85–67	San Pablo Inmobiliaria Burgos	Ourense
21:00	Scoring by quarter: 22–15, 16–17, 22–23, 25–12
	Pts: Kapelan 18; Rebs: Rowley 3 Asts: Rivero 3 PIR: Zamora 17	Boxscore	Pts: Vega 14; Rebs: Tončinić 6 Asts: Maresch 2 PIR: Vega 18	Arena: Pazo dos Deportes Paco Paz; Referees: De Lucas de Lucas, Palomo Cañas

1 May 2016	Ourense Provincia Termal	91–65	San Pablo Inmobiliaria Burgos	Ourense
19:00	Scoring by quarter: 18–13, 24–12, 25–18, 24–22
	Pts: Rivero 19; Rebs: Rowley 8 Asts: Rejón 3 PIR: Rivero 25	Boxscore	Pts: Martínez 13; Rebs: Poščić, Tončinić 3 Asts: Maresch 3 PIR: Martínez 13	Arena: Pazo dos Deportes Paco Paz; Referees: Rupérez Vielba, Sánchez Ardid

3 May 2016	San Pablo Inmobiliaria Burgos	74–61	Ourense Provincia Termal	Burgos
21:00	Scoring by quarter: 25–16, 14–11, 23–19, 12–15
	Pts: Pečiukevičius, Sinica 14; Rebs: Tončinić 8 Asts: Pečiukevičius 3 PIR: Pečiukevičius 20	Boxscore	Pts: Zamora 13; Rebs: Rowley 10; Asts: Rejón 5 PIR: Rejón 21	Arena: Polideportivo El Plantío; Referees: Uruñuela Uruñuela, García León

=== Unión Financiera Baloncesto Oviedo v Peñas Huesca ===
22 April 2016	Unión Financiera Baloncesto Oviedo	55–74	Peñas Huesca	Oviedo
21:00	Scoring by quarter: 8–18, 17–20, 16–21, 14–15
	Pts: Cabanas 15; Rebs: Windler 8 Asts: Bassas, Miso 3 PIR: Cabanas 20	Boxscore	Pts: Steinarsson 17; Rebs: Huskić 6 Asts: Huskić 4 PIR: Huskić 19	Arena: Polideportivo de Pumarín; Referees: Sanchez Ardid, Padrós Feliu

24 April 2016	Unión Financiera Baloncesto Oviedo	67–72	Peñas Huesca	Oviedo
18:15	Scoring by quarter: 12–19, 14–21, 19–23, 22–9
	Pts: three players 15; Rebs: Windler 8 Asts: Bassas, Miso 5 PIR: Bassas 21	Boxscore	Pts: Bordignon 23; Rebs: Huskić 8 Asts: Díaz, Steinarsson 3 PIR: Bordignon 22	Arena: Polideportivo de Pumarín; Referees: Pagán Baró, Rupérez Vielba

29 April 2016	Peñas Huesca	76–85	Unión Financiera Baloncesto Oviedo	Huesca
21:00	Scoring by quarter: 22–24, 16–9, 16–18, 22–34
	Pts: Díaz 16; Rebs: Huskić 5 Asts: Huskić 5 PIR: Díaz 17	Boxscore	Pts: Hearst 19; Rebs: Cabanas 7 Asts: Miso 8 PIR: Trist 17	Arena: Palacio Municipal de Deportes; Referees: Morales García-Alcaide, Pazos Pazos

1 May 2016	Peñas Huesca	85–67	Unión Financiera Baloncesto Oviedo	Huesca
12:15	Scoring by quarter: 24–25, 14–19, 29–12, 18–11
	Pts: Huskić 25; Rebs: Lafuente 6 Asts: Huskić 6 PIR: Huskić 34	Boxscore	Pts: Bassas 19; Rebs: Hearst 7 Asts: Bassas, Hearst 3 PIR: Bassas 21	Arena: Palacio Municipal de Deportes; Referees: Zamora Rodríguez, Vázquez García

=== Leyma Básquet Coruña v Cafés Candelas Breogán ===
22 April 2016	Leyma Básquet Coruña	90–86	Cafés Candelas Breogán	A Coruña
21:00	Scoring by quarter: 22–22, 12–18, 28–22, 28–24
	Pts: Burjanadze 22; Rebs: Olmos 7 Asts: Olmos 4 PIR: Burjanadze, Olmos 21	Boxscore	Pts: Xavier 30; Rebs: Samb 6 Asts: Llorente 3 PIR: Xavier 28	Arena: Pazo dos Deportes de Riazor; Referees: Muñoz García, García Rodríguez

24 April 2016	Leyma Básquet Coruña	85–90	Cafés Candelas Breogán	A Coruña
12:00	Scoring by quarter: 16–26, 19–25, 21–21, 29–18
	Pts: Olmos 20; Rebs: Burjanadze 9 Asts: Monaghan 7 PIR: Burjanadze, Olmos 20	Boxscore	Pts: Matulionis 33; Rebs: Wright 10; Asts: López, Xavier 4 PIR: Matulionis 35	Arena: Pazo dos Deportes de Riazor; Referees: García León, Terreros San Miguel

29 April 2016	Cafés Candelas Breogán	75–76	Leyma Básquet Coruña	Lugo
21:00	Scoring by quarter: 17–19, 15–16, 28–21, 15–20
	Pts: Xavier 23; Rebs: Ortega 7 Asts: Llorente, Xavier 4 PIR: Xavier 22	Boxscore	Pts: Olmos 17; Rebs: Olmos 10; Asts: Creus 6 PIR: Olmos 25	Arena: Pazo dos Deportes; Referees: Uruñuela Uruñuela, Quintas Álvarez

1 May 2016	Cafés Candelas Breogán	90–83	Leyma Básquet Coruña	Lugo
18:00	Scoring by quarter: 23–16, 29–22, 18–25, 20–20
	Pts: Ortega 31; Rebs: Wright 9 Asts: Xavier 4 PIR: Ortega 34	Boxscore	Pts: Olmos 20; Rebs: Olmos 5 Asts: Monaghan5; PIR: Olmos 26	Arena: Pazo dos Deportes; Referees: Morales Ruiz, Mendoza Holgado

3 May 2016	Leyma Básquet Coruña	99–63	Cafés Candelas Breogán	A Coruña
21:00	Scoring by quarter: 29–22, 21–15, 18–11, 31–15
	Pts: Stelzer 24; Rebs: Burjanadze 8 Asts: Monaghan 9 PIR: Stelzer 29	Boxscore	Pts: Llorente, Xavier 12; Rebs: Ortega 7 Asts: Llorente 6 PIR: Ortega 13	Arena: Pazo dos Deportes de Riazor; Referees: Pagán Baró, Rupérez Vielba

== Semifinals ==
=== Club Melilla Baloncesto v Leyma Básquet Coruña ===
6 May 2016	Club Melilla Baloncesto	101–83	Leyma Básquet Coruña	Melilla
21:00	Scoring by quarter: 23–21, 27–19, 18–22, 33–21
	Pts: Hernández-Sonseca, Suka-Umu 15; Rebs: Franch, Walton 6 Asts: Suka-Umu 6 PIR: Suka-Umu 22	Boxscore	Pts: Monaghan 23; Rebs: Olmos 5 Asts: Monaghan 4 PIR: Monaghan 27	Arena: Pabellón Javier Imbroda Ortiz; Referees: Morales Ruiz, Mendoza Holgado

8 May 2016	Club Melilla Baloncesto	97–99	Leyma Básquet Coruña	Melilla
19:00	Scoring by quarter: 27–25, 27–23, 18–22, 25–29
	Pts: Franch, Suka-Umu 17; Rebs: Walton 9 Asts: Franch 5 PIR: Manzano 23	Boxscore	Pts: Monaghan 25; Rebs: Burjanadze 8 Asts: Monaghan 9 PIR: Monaghan 31	Arena: Pabellón Javier Imbroda Ortiz; Referees: De Lucas de Lucas, Gómez López

13 May 2016	Leyma Básquet Coruña	82–71	Club Melilla Baloncesto	A Coruña
21:00	Scoring by quarter: 22–15, 16–21, 13–14, 31–21
	Pts: Burjanadze 18; Rebs: Burjanadze, Žylė 10; Asts: four players 3 PIR: Burjanadze 19	Boxscore	Pts: Franch 20; Rebs: Hernández Sonseca, Walton 6 Asts: Suka-Umu 4 PIR: Franch 22	Arena: Pazo dos Deportes de Riazor; Referees: Vázquez García, Zamora Rodríguez

15 May 2016	Leyma Básquet Coruña	61–81	Club Melilla Baloncesto	A Coruña
12:30	Scoring by quarter: 20–22, 13–21, 14–22, 14–16
	Pts: Burjanadze 15; Rebs: Burjanadze, Žylė 5 Asts: Monaghan 5 PIR: Olmos 13	Boxscore	Pts: Suka-Umu 16; Rebs: E. Almazán 8 Asts: P. Almazán 6 PIR: Franch 18	Arena: Pazo dos Deportes de Riazor; Referees: Pagán Baró, Zafra Guerra

17 May 2016	Club Melilla Baloncesto	88–82	Leyma Básquet Coruña	Melilla
21:00	Scoring by quarter: 24–20, 22–14, 17–26, 25–22
	Pts: Suka-Umu 24; Rebs: Hernández-Sonseca 10; Asts: four players 3 PIR: Suka-Umu 25	Boxscore	Pts: Olmos 22; Rebs: Hernández 7 Asts: Monaghan 7 PIR: Olmos 26	Arena: Pabellón Javier Imbroda Ortiz; Referees: García León, Pinela García

=== San Pablo Inmobiliaria Burgos v Peñas Huesca ===
6 May 2016	San Pablo Inmobiliaria Burgos	78–76	Peñas Huesca	Burgos
21:00	Scoring by quarter: 27–18, 17–17, 20–25, 14–16
	Pts: Poščić 14; Rebs: three players 5 Asts: Vilanova 9 PIR: Poščić 20	Boxscore	Pts: Huskić 25; Rebs: Bordignon 8 Asts: Steinarsson 6 PIR: Huskić 27	Arena: Polideportivo El Plantío; Referees: De Lucas de Lucas, Sánchez Ardid

8 May 2016	San Pablo Inmobiliaria Burgos	66–78	Peñas Huesca	Burgos
20:00	Scoring by quarter: 15–20, 18–19, 16–19, 17–20
	Pts: Maresch 12; Rebs: Poščić 8 Asts: Maresch 5 PIR: Maresch 21	Boxscore	Pts: Huskić 18; Rebs: Bordignon 10; Asts: Díaz 5 PIR: Bordignon, Huskić 20	Arena: Polideportivo El Plantío; Referees: Zamora Rodríguez, Rupérez Vielba

13 May 2016	Peñas Huesca	83–71	San Pablo Inmobiliaria Burgos	Huesca
21:00	Scoring by quarter: 22–18, 22–20, 15–19, 24–14
	Pts: Díaz 23; Rebs: Huskić 10; Asts: Huskić 6 PIR: Díaz 29	Boxscore	Pts: Vega 16; Rebs: Tončinić 10; Asts: Maresch, Vilanova 4 PIR: Vega 19	Arena: Palacio Municipal de Deportes; Referees: Pagán Baró, Terreros San Miguel

15 May 2016	Peñas Huesca	83–72	San Pablo Inmobiliaria Burgos	Huesca
18:00	Scoring by quarter: 21–20, 14–16, 17–15, 31–21
	Pts: Bordignon 15; Rebs: Bordignon 7 Asts: four players 4 PIR: Maldūnas 22	Boxscore	Pts: Tončinić 15; Rebs: Tončinić 9 Asts: Vega, Vilanova 3 PIR: Tončinić 17	Arena: Palacio Municipal de Deportes; Referees: Morales Ruiz, García León

== Finals ==
20 May 2016	Club Melilla Baloncesto	86–81	Peñas Huesca	Melilla
21:00	Scoring by quarter: 24–27, 19–14, 20–20, 23–20
	Pts: Hernández-Sonseca 23; Rebs: Hernández-Sonseca 7 Asts: Suka-Umu 10; PIR: Hernández-Sonseca 28	Boxscore	Pts: Huskić 15; Rebs: Maldūnas 5 Asts: Díaz 4 PIR: Fulwood, Díaz 17	Arena: Pabellón Javier Imbroda Ortiz; Referees: Pagán Baró, Rupérez Vielba

22 May 2016	Club Melilla Baloncesto	91–64	Peñas Huesca	Melilla
19:00	Scoring by quarter: 16–16, 32–18, 21–19, 22–11
	Pts: Hernández-Sonseca 15; Rebs: three players 6 Asts: three players 5 PIR: Hernández-Sonseca 19	Boxscore	Pts: Bordignon 13; Rebs: Bordignon 8 Asts: three players 2 PIR: Bordignon 14	Arena: Pabellón Javier Imbroda Ortiz; Referees: Uruñuela Uruñuela, Mendoza Holgado

27 May 2016	Peñas Huesca	86–93(OT)	Club Melilla Baloncesto	Huesca
21:00	Scoring by quarter: 20–22, 16–16, 18–21, 25–20, Overtime: 7–14
	Pts: Huskić 24; Rebs: Huskić 11; Asts: Huskić 6 PIR: Huskić 31	Boxscore	Pts: Zengotitabengoa 17; Rebs: Walton 9 Asts: Suka-Umu 6 PIR: Hernández-Sonseca 21	Arena: Palacio Municipal de Deportes; Referees: De Lucas De Lucas, García León
