= 2015–16 LEB Oro season =

LEB Oro
- Season: 2015–16
- Games played: 240 (Regular season); 21–35 (Playoffs)
- Teams: 16

Regular season
- Promoted: Quesos Cerrato Palencia; Club Melilla Baloncesto
- Relegated: Planasa Navarra; Actel Força Lleida

Finals
- Champions: Quesos Cerrato Palencia

Records
- Biggest home win: Breogán 86–55 Prat Joventut (28 November 2015)
- Biggest away win: Prat Joventut 52–85 Palencia (11 November 2015)
- Highest scoring: Amics Castelló 95–101 Palencia (30 October 2015)
- Winning streak: 12 games Quesos Cerrato Palencia
- Losing streak: 9 games CB Prat Joventut

The 2015–16 LEB Oro season was the 20th season of the Spanish basketball second league LEB Oro. The season started on October 2 and ended on May 27 with the last game of the promotion playoffs finals.

== Teams ==
=== Promotion and relegation (pre-season) ===
Despite the aim to increase the number of teams to sixteen, finally a total of 14 teams contested the league, including 12 sides from the 2014–15 season and two promoted from the 2014–15 LEB Plata. Ford Burgos, CB Valladolid and Instituto de Fertilidad Clínicas Rincón, who will play in this season's LEB Plata resigned to play in the league while CB Prat Joventut, relegated in the last season, achieved a vacant berth.

On 28 August 2015, the Spanish Basketball Federation extended the league to 16 teams with FC Barcelona Lassa B from LEB Plata and San Pablo Inmobiliaria Burgos, a new-creation in Burgos that replaces Ford Burgos.

Teams relegated from the 2014–15 Liga ACB

- ~~Gipuzkoa Basket~~ (will play in ACB as Ford Burgos did not fulfill the requirements to promote)
- ~~Montakit Fuenlabrada~~ (will play in ACB as Club Ourense Baloncesto was not admitted in the league)

Teams promoted from the 2014–15 LEB Plata

- Cáceres Patrimonio de la Humanidad
- Amics Castelló

=== Venues and locations ===
Location of teams in 2015–16 LEB Oro season

Team	City	Arena	Capacity
Actel Força Lleida	Lleida	Pavelló Barris Nord	6,100
Amics Castelló	Castellón de la Plana	Pabellón Ciutat de Castelló	5,500
Cáceres Patrimonio de la Humanidad	Cáceres	Multiusos Ciudad de Cáceres	6,500
Cafés Candelas Breogán	Lugo	Pazo dos Deportes	6,500
CB Prat Joventut	El Prat de Llobregat	Pavelló Joan Busquets	1,000
Club Melilla Baloncesto	Melilla	Pabellón Javier Imbroda Ortiz	3,800
Cocinas.com	Logroño	Palacio de los Deportes	3,851
FC Barcelona Lassa B	Sant Joan Despí	Ciutat Esportiva Joan Gamper	472
Leyma Básquet Coruña	A Coruña	Pazo dos Deportes de Riazor	3,500
Ourense Provincia Termal	Ourense	Pazo Paco Paz	5,500
Palma Air Europa	Palma de Mallorca	Son Moix	5,076
Peñas Huesca	Huesca	Palacio Municipal de Huesca	5,018
Planasa Navarra (Note: Planasa loaned the sponsorship to the Spanish Association Against Cancer for one game of the 2015–16 season."Planasa cede su patrocinio a AECC Navarra para la próxima jornada" (in Spanish). Diario de Navarra. 30 January 2016.)	Pamplona	Pabellón Universitario de Navarra (Note: Planasa Navarra moved from Pabellón Anaitasuna in February 2016.)	3,000
Quesos Cerrato Palencia	Palencia	Pabellón Marta Domínguez	1,806
San Pablo Inmobiliaria Burgos	Burgos	Polideportivo El Plantío	2,500
Unión Financiera Baloncesto Oviedo	Oviedo	Polideportivo de Pumarín	1,250

=== Personnel and kit manufacturers ===
Team	Chairman	Head coach	Kit manufacturer
Actel Força Lleida	Félix González	Joaquín Prado	Joma
Amics Castelló	Luis García Sainz	Antonio Ten	Score
Cáceres Patrimonio de la Humanidad	José Manuel Sánchez	Ñete Bohígas	Vive
Cafés Candelas Breogán	Antonio Veiga	Quique Fraga	Élide
CB Prat Joventut	Arseni Conde	Roberto Sánchez	Austral
Club Melilla Baloncesto	Jaime Auday	Alejandro Alcoba	Vive
Ourense Provincia Termal	Jorge Bermello	Gonzalo García	Vive
Cocinas.com	Manuel de Miguel	Antonio Pérez	Mercury
FC Barcelona Lassa B	Josep Maria Bartomeu	Alfred Julbe	Nike
Leyma Básquet Coruña	Juan Carlos Fernández	Tito Díaz	Altius
Palma Air Europa	Fernando Moral	Xavi Sastre	Altius
Peñas Huesca	Antonio Orús	Quim Costa	Barri
Planasa Navarra	José Javier Sobrino	Carlos Frade	BZK
Quesos Cerrato Palencia	Gonzalo Ibáñez	Sergio García	Discóbolo
San Pablo Inmobiliaria Burgos	Jesús Martínez Nogal	Diego Epifanio	Hummel
Unión Financiera Baloncesto Oviedo	Fernando Villabella	Carles Marco	Royal

=== Managerial changes ===
Team	Outgoing manager	Manner of departure	Date of vacancy	Replaced with	Date of appointment	Position in table
Unión Financiera Baloncesto Oviedo	Guillermo Arenas	End of contract	28 April 2015	Carles Marco	7 July 2015	Pre-season
Quesos Cerrato Palencia	Natxo Lezkano	End of contract	29 May 2015	Porfirio Fisac	29 June 2015	Pre-season
San Pablo Inmobiliaria Burgos	Andreu Casadevall	Signed for CAI Zaragoza	23 November 2015	Diego Epifanio	23 November 2015	7th (5–4)
Quesos Cerrato Palencia	Porfirio Fisac	Signed for RETAbet.es GBC	2 December 2015	Sergio García	2 December 2015	1st (9–1)
Palma Air Europa	Ángel Cepeda	Sacked	18 January 2016	Xavi Sastre	18 January 2016	3rd (11–7)
Planasa Navarra	Sergio Lamúa	Sacked	9 February 2016	Carlos Frade	9 February 2016	13th (7–13)
Cafés Candelas Breogán	Lisardo Gómez	Resigned	9 March 2016	Quique Fraga	9 March 2016	11th (11–13)

== Regular season ==
=== League table ===
Pos	Team	Pld	W	L	PF	PA	PD	Pts	Promotion, qualification or relegation
1	Quesos Cerrato Palencia (C)	30	23	7	2407	2157	+250	53	Promotion to ACB
2	Club Melilla Baloncesto	30	22	8	2427	2182	+245	52	Qualification to playoffs
3	San Pablo Inmobiliaria Burgos	30	18	12	2290	2167	+123	48	Qualification to playoffs
4	Unión Financiera Baloncesto Oviedo	30	18	12	2286	2330	−44	48	Qualification to playoffs
5	Leyma Básquet Coruña	30	17	13	2424	2348	+76	47	Qualification to playoffs
6	Cafés Candelas Breogán	30	17	13	2315	2231	+84	47	Qualification to playoffs
7	Peñas Huesca	30	16	14	2252	2176	+76	46	Qualification to playoffs
8	Ourense Provincia Termal	30	15	15	2229	2293	−64	45	Qualification to playoffs
9	Cáceres Patrimonio de la Humanidad	30	14	16	2164	2249	−85	44	Qualification to playoffs
10	Palma Air Europa	30	14	16	2309	2286	+23	44	
11	Amics Castelló	30	13	17	2406	2454	−48	43	
12	FC Barcelona Lassa B	30	13	17	2271	2346	−75	43	
13	Cocinas.com	30	11	19	2351	2373	−22	41	
14	CB Prat Joventut	30	10	20	2105	2334	−229	40	
15	Planasa Navarra	30	10	20	2177	2343	−166	40	Relegation to LEB Plata
16	Actel Força Lleida	30	9	21	2161	2305	−144	39	Relegation to LEB Plata

Source: LEB Oro
(C) Champions

=== Positions by round ===
The table lists the positions of teams after completion of each round.

Team \ Round	1	2	3	4	5	6	7	8	9	10	11	12	13	14	15	16	17	18	19	20	21	22	23	24	25	26	27	28	29	30	PO
Quesos Cerrato Palencia	4	10	5	2	1	1	1	1	1	1	1	1	1	1	1	1	1	1	1	1	1	1	1	1	1	1	1	1	1	1	1
Club Melilla Baloncesto	2	1	3	1	4	8	7	6	4	3	3	3	2	2	2	2	2	2	2	2	2	2	2	2	2	2	2	2	2	2	2
Peñas Huesca	7	11	11	12	11	13	13	12	9	10	12	10	9	9	8	5	5	5	3	3	3	3	5	3	3	6	4	6	7	7	3
San Pablo Inmobiliaria Burgos	12	6	4	8	6	3	2	7	7	8	8	5	4	4	4	4	4	4	4	6	9	6	4	5	4	3	3	3	3	3	4
Leyma Básquet Coruña	13	14	14	13	14	14	14	14	14	13	15	12	11	10	9	11	8	11	10	9	5	7	9	6	5	5	6	5	5	5	5
Unión Financiera Baloncesto Oviedo	10	7	12	9	8	5	4	4	5	6	6	8	5	7	5	6	6	6	6	4	4	4	3	4	6	4	5	4	4	4	6
Cafés Candelas Breogán	6	3	1	6	2	4	8	8	8	7	7	4	6	8	10	10	11	12	11	11	11	11	11	11	11	10	7	7	6	6	7
Ourense Provincia Termal	15	12	10	11	13	11	12	13	11	11	10	9	10	12	13	13	12	10	12	12	12	12	12	12	12	11	9	8	8	8	8
Cáceres Patrimonio de la Humanidad	8	4	8	5	7	9	10	11	13	15	13	15	12	11	11	7	10	8	8	8	6	10	8	8	8	8	10	10	9	9	9
Palma Air Europa	3	2	9	10	9	7	6	5	2	2	2	2	3	3	3	3	3	3	5	5	7	8	10	9	9	9	11	11	10	10	10
Amics Castelló	9	8	6	3	5	2	3	2	6	5	5	7	8	6	7	8	7	7	7	7	8	5	6	10	10	12	12	12	11	11	11
FC Barcelona Lassa B	5	9	7	4	3	6	5	3	3	4	4	6	7	5	6	9	9	9	9	10	10	9	7	7	7	7	8	9	12	12	12
Cocinas.com	1	5	2	7	10	12	9	10	12	12	14	13	14	14	14	14	15	15	15	14	13	13	13	13	13	13	13	13	13	13	13
CB Prat Joventut	16	16	13	14	15	15	16	16	16	16	16	16	16	16	16	15	16	16	16	16	16	16	15	16	16	15	16	15	14	14	14
Planasa Navarra	14	15	15	15	12	10	11	9	10	9	9	11	13	13	12	12	13	13	13	13	14	14	14	14	15	16	15	16	15	15	15
Actel Força Lleida	11	13	16	16	16	16	15	15	15	14	11	14	15	15	15	16	14	14	14	15	15	15	16	15	14	14	14	14	16	16	16

=== Results ===
Home \ Away	FLL	CAS	CAC	BRE	PRA	MEL	COC	FCB	COR	COB	PLM	PEÑ	NAV	PAL	BUR	OVI
Actel Força Lleida		86–97	77–60	72–79	90–79	64–71	62–72	77–71	82–85	66–73	77–90	58–76	80–70	66–77	91–84	72–74
Amics Castelló	85–65		85–87	77–79	68–69	80–73	77–76	92–76	79–78	80–86	71–94	81–85	87–76	95–101	60–79	77–82
Cáceres Patrimonio de la Humanidad	69–73	80–73		73–58	73–54	82–79	101–93	60–74	69–85	64–76	81–69	79–75	90–83	82–78	75–68	76–83
Cafés Candelas Breogán	76–74	83–87	77–56		86–55	69–68	76–62	68–83	84–89	90–68	65–74	76–87	100–72	70–79	66–76	88–81
CB Prat Joventut	72–66	101–88	70–62	70–76		95–80	81–108	79–94	61–80	96–83	62–83	68–64	56–60	52–85	63–70	66–73
Club Melilla Baloncesto	101–78	70–76	78–64	70–61	76–53		85–93	80–74	86–72	98–71	94–78	72–70	93–74	89–77	66–65	95–65
Cocinas.com	67–64	76–83	78–81	84–98	59–71	72–92		79–89	71–77	88–90	74–70	72–73	75–58	74–70	81–88	92–64
FC Barcelona Lassa B	70–78	77–82	75–69	72–90	70–69	73–85	85–91		76–88	82–72	70–73	71–67	71–64	62–71	64–79	73–90
Leyma Básquet Coruña	100–86	76–83	85–75	71–62	96–77	77–71	95–83	76–71		73–90	91–81	72–76	74–70	78–89	66–73	76–85
Ourense Provincia Termal	84–69	86–75	59–70	53–71	85–76	55–75	74–72	79–83	68–62		67–86	69–75	90–74	56–63	71–62	65–69
Palma Air Europa	65–71	80–73	65–70	86–88	68–74	62–68	74–77	87–75	86–81	90–91		85–74	87–76	55–83	86–79	69–76
Peñas Huesca	73–65	105–85	74–56	83–75	70–69	62–71	93–74	79–86	64–78	65–74	67–82		74–48	89–63	79–80	77–75
Planasa Navarra	66–76	85–81	72–65	79–70	59–69	75–83	81–79	82–84	79–76	89–79	79–84	68–62		94–81	60–75	89–88
Quesos Cerrato Palencia	76–65	94–75	78–60	74–85	94–63	80–83	77–76	83–68	91–86	78–65	74–59	81–61	76–71		81–62	97–74
San Pablo Inmobiliaria Burgos	67–43	74–83	73–57	78–73	89–66	85–81	85–80	77–84	82–86	76–82	77–67	83–70	76–61	74–82		78–63
Unión Financiera Baloncesto Oviedo	76–68	75–71	82–78	78–86	79–69	80–94	59–73	80–68	98–95	76–68	81–74	60–83	72–63	68–74	80–76	

Legend: Blue = home team win; Yellow = draw; Red = away team win.

== Copa Princesa de Asturias ==
At the half of the league, the two first teams in the table play the Copa Princesa de Asturias at home of the winner of the first half season (15th round). If this team doesn't want to host the Copa Princesa, the second qualified can do it. If nobody wants to host it, the Federation will propose a neutral venue.

The Champion of this Cup will play the play-offs as first qualified if it finishes the league between the 2nd and the 5th qualified. The Copa Princesa will be played on January 29, 2016.

=== Teams qualified ===
Pos	Team	Pld	W	L	PF	PA	PD	Pts
1	Quesos Cerrato Palencia	15	13	2	1190	1030	+160	28
2	Club Melilla Baloncesto	15	11	4	1234	1076	+158	26

=== The game ===
29 January 2016
21:00

Boxscore

Quesos Cerrato Palencia	87–85 (OT)	Club Melilla Baloncesto
Scoring by quarter: 21–17, 11–23, 23–12, 10–13, Overtime: 9–9, 13–11
Pts: Rodríguez 30; Rebs: Otegui 9 Asts: Otegui 5 PIR: Rodríguez 27		Pts: Almazán 20; Rebs: Edwards 10; Asts: Franch 5 PIR: Franch 23
Quesos Cerrato Palencia, champion of the Copa Princesa de Asturias

Polideportivo Marta Domínguez, Palencia
Attendance: 3,000
Referees: Torres Sánchez, Sánchez Sixto, García Rodríguez

== Playoffs ==
Quarterfinals (22, 24, 29 April, 1, 3 May)
2	Club Melilla Baloncesto	72	73	88	X	X
9	Cáceres Patrimonio de la Humanidad	55	71	82	X	X
5	Leyma Básquet Coruña	90	85	76	83	99
6	Cafés Candelas Breogán	86	90	75	90	63
3	San Pablo Inmobiliaria Burgos	73	81	67	65	74
8	Ourense Provincia Termal	72	64	85	91	61
4	Unión Financiera Baloncesto Oviedo	55	67	85	67	X
7	Peñas Huesca	74	72	76	85	X

Semifinals (6, 8, 13, 15, 17 May)
2	Club Melilla Baloncesto	101	97	71	81	88
5	Leyma Básquet Coruña	83	99	82	61	82
3	San Pablo Inmobiliaria Burgos	78	66	71	72	X
7	Peñas Huesca	76	78	83	83	X

Finals (20, 22, 27, 29, 31 May)
2	Club Melilla Baloncesto	86	91	93	X	X
7	Peñas Huesca	81	64	86	X	X

== Stats leaders in regular season ==
=== Points ===
Rk	Name	Team	Games	Points	PPG
1	(Spain) Ricardo Guillén	Palma Air Europa	30	561	18.7
2	(United States) Jordan Swing	Unión Financiera Baloncesto Oviedo	16	284	17.7
3	(Georgia (country)) Beka Burjanadze	Leyma Básquet Coruña	30	499	16.6
4	(Spain) Óliver Arteaga	Planasa Navarra	28	458	16.4
5	(Spain) Marc García	FC Barcelona Lassa B	29	471	16.2

=== Rebounds ===
Rk	Name	Team	Games	Rebounds	RPG
1	(Spain) Óliver Arteaga	Planasa Navarra	28	272	9.7
2	(Bosnia and Herzegovina) Emir Sulejmanović	FC Barcelona Lassa B	25	216	8.6
3	(Lithuania) Tautvydas Šležas	Cáceres Patrimonio de la Humanidad	20	166	8.3
4	(Spain) Sergio Olmos	Leyma Básquet Coruña	30	217	7.2
5	(Georgia (country)) Beka Burjanadze	Leyma Básquet Coruña	30	211	7.0

=== Assists ===
Rk	Name	Team	Games	Assists	APG
1	(Spain) Ferrán Bassas	Unión Financiera Baloncesto Oviedo	30	195	6.5
2	(Spain) Mikel Uriz	Palma Air Europa	30	149	5.0
3	(Spain) Dani López	Cafés Candelas Breogán	21	87	4.1
4	(United States) Zach Monaghan	Leyma Básquet Coruña	30	123	4.1
5	(Spain) Lluís Costa	Peñas Huesca	19	76	4.0

=== Performance Index Rating ===
Rk	Name	Team	Games	Rating	PIR
1	(Spain) Óliver Arteaga	Planasa Navarra	28	649	23.2
2	(Spain) Ricardo Guillén	Palma Air Europa	30	661	22.0
3	(Georgia (country)) Beka Burjanadze	Leyma Básquet Coruña	30	549	18.3
4	(United States) Jordan Swing	Unión Financiera Baloncesto Oviedo	16	292	18.2
5	(Spain) Sergio Olmos	Leyma Básquet Coruña	30	526	17.5

== Awards ==
=== All-LEB Oro team ===
The All-LEB Oro team was selected after the end of the playoffs.

- (Spain) Borja Arévalo (Cocinas.com)
- (Cape Verde) Jeff Xavier (Cafés Candelas Breogán)
- (Spain) Marc Blanch (Quesos Cerrato Palencia)
- (Spain) Eduardo Hernández-Sonseca (Club Melilla Baloncesto)
- (Spain) Óliver Arteaga (Planasa Navarra)

=== MVP of the regular season ===
- (Spain) Óliver Arteaga (Planasa Navarra)

=== Coach of the season ===
- (Spain) Sergio García (Quesos Cerrato Palencia)

=== All-Rising Stars team ===
This was the first year that this team was chosen.

- (Spain) Ferran Bassas (Unión Financiera Baloncesto Oviedo)
- (Spain) Marc García (FC Barcelona Lassa B), also chosen as Rising Star Player of the season.
- (Spain) Joan Tomàs (Quesos Cerrato Palencia)
- (Georgia (country)) Beka Burjanadze (Leyma Básquet Coruña)
- (Serbia) Goran Huskić (Peñas Huesca)
- Coach: (Spain) Quim Costa (Peñas Huesca)

=== MVP by week ===
Round	Player	Team	PIR
1	(Puerto Rico) Emmy Andujar	Actel Força Lleida	31
2	(Spain) Ricardo Guillén	Palma Air Europa	35
3	(Croatia) Matija Poščić	San Pablo Inmobiliaria Burgos	30
4	(Spain) Carles Bravo	Cocinas.com	32
5	(United States) Lamont Barnes	Quesos Cerrato Palencia	29
5	(Spain) Ricardo Guillén	Palma Air Europa	29
6	(Spain) Óliver Arteaga	Planasa Navarra	34
6	(Spain) Xavi Forcada	CB Prat Joventut	34
7	(Georgia (country)) Beka Burjanadze	Leyma Básquet Coruña	36
8	(United States) Brandon Garrett	Amics Castelló	40
9	(Georgia (country)) Beka Burjanadze	Leyma Básquet Coruña	35
10	(Georgia (country)) Beka Burjanadze	Leyma Básquet Coruña	36
11	(United States) Jordan Swing	Unión Financiera Baloncesto Oviedo	48
12	(Georgia (country)) Beka Burjanadze	Leyma Básquet Coruña	27
12	(Spain) Sergio Llorente	Cafés Candelas Breogán	27
13	(Spain) Óliver Arteaga	Planasa Navarra	39
14	(Senegal) Papa Mbaye	FC Barcelona Lassa B	32
14	(Spain) Marcos Suka-Umu	Club Melilla Baloncesto	32
15	(Spain) Marc García	FC Barcelona Lassa B	33
16	(Spain) Eduardo Hernández-Sonseca	Club Melilla Baloncesto	40
17	(Spain) Óliver Arteaga	Planasa Navarra	24
17	(Spain) Mikel Uriz	Palma Air Europa	24
18	(Spain) Iñaki Narros	Planasa Navarra	34
19	(Lithuania) Tautvydas Šležas	Patrimonio de la Humanidad	35
20	(Spain) Josep Ortega	Cafés Candelas Breogán	29
21	(Serbia) Goran Huskić	Peñas Huesca	30
22	(Spain) Andrés Miso	Unión Financiera Baloncesto Oviedo	38
23	(Spain) Xavi Forcada	CB Prat Joventut	39
24	(Spain) Ricardo Guillén	Palma Air Europa	38
25	(Spain) Marc García	FC Barcelona Lassa B	30
26	(Spain) Ricardo Guillén	Palma Air Europa	36
27	(Serbia) Goran Huskić	Peñas Huesca	34
28	(Lithuania) Osvaldas Matulionis	Cafés Candelas Breogán	28
29	(Spain) Urko Otegui	Quesos Cerrato Palencia	34
30	(Dominican Republic) Dagoberto Peña	Leyma Básquet Coruña	27
30	(Spain) Josep Pérez	Actel Força Lleida	27
