= 2014–15 LEB Oro season =

LEB Oro
- Season: 2014–15
- Games played: 210 (Regular season)
- Teams: 15
- TV partner(s): TVE, FORTA

Regular season
- Season MVP: (Spain) Ricardo Guillén
- Promoted: Ford Burgos; Club Ourense Baloncesto
- Relegated: CB Prat Joventut

Finals
- Champions: Ford Burgos

Statistical leaders
Points	(Spain) Ricardo Guillén	16.44
Rebounds	(Trinidad and Tobago) Kyle Rowley	9.07
Assists	(Spain) Mikel Uriz	5.18
Index Rating	(Spain) Ricardo Guillén	20.4

Records
- Biggest home win: Ford Burgos 109–64 Oviedo (6 March 2015)
- Biggest away win: Clínicas Rincón 45–85 Valladolid (24 January 2015)
- Highest scoring: Ford Burgos 91–95 Ourense (7 November 2014)
- Winning streak: 14 wins Ford Burgos
- Losing streak: 11 games Clínicas Rincón
- All statistics correct as of 17 April 2015.

The 2014–15 LEB Oro season is the 19th season of the Liga Española de Baloncesto, the Spanish basketball second division. It is named Adecco Oro as its sponsored identity. The season will start on October 3 and will end on May 15, 17 or 19 with the last game of the promotion playoffs finals.

== Competition format ==
=== Regular season ===
The regular season was played by round-robin system.

After the first leg of the season, the two top qualified teams played the Copa Príncipe de Asturias and the leader will be the host team.

At the final of the season:

- The regular season winner promoted directly to Liga ACB.
- Teams qualified between 2nd and 9th, joined the promotion play-offs to ACB. Quarterfinals will be played in a best-of-3 format and semifinals and the final in a best-of-5 one.
- Only the last qualified team was relegated to LEB Plata.

== Team information and location ==
New teams in the league

- MyWigo Valladolid (relegated from 2013–14 ACB)
- CB Prat Joventut (runner-up of the 2013–14 LEB Plata)
- Palma Air Europa (3rd qualified of 2013–14 LEB Plata, promoted after the resignation of Fundación Baloncesto Fuenlabrada)

Teams that left the league

- MoraBanc Andorra (promoted to 2014–15 ACB)
- FC Barcelona B (relegated to 2014–15 LEB Plata)
Location of teams in 2013–14 LEB Oro

Team	City	Arena	Capacity	Head coach
Actel Força Lleida	Lleida	Pavelló Barris Nord	6,100	Joaquín Prado
CB Prat Joventut	El Prat de Llobregat	Pavelló Joan Busquets	1,500	Agustí Julbe
Club Melilla Baloncesto	Melilla	Pabellón Javier Imbroda Ortiz	3,800	Alejandro Alcoba
Club Ourense Baloncesto	Ourense	Pazo dos Deportes Paco Paz	5,000	Gonzalo García de Vitoria
Cocinas.com	Logroño	Palacio de los Deportes	3,851	Antonio Pérez
Ford Burgos	Burgos	Polideportivo El Plantío	2,432	Andreu Casadevall
Instituto de Fertilidad Clínicas Rincón	Málaga	Ciudad Deportiva de Carranque	1,500	Paco Aurioles
Leyma Básquet Coruña	A Coruña	Pazo dos Deportes de Riazor	3,500	Antonio Pérez
MyWigo Valladolid	Valladolid	Polideportivo Pisuerga	6,800	Porfirio Fisac
Palma Air Europa	Palma de Mallorca	Son Moix	5,076	Maties Cerdà
Peñas Huesca	Huesca	Palacio Municipal de Huesca	5,018	Quim Costa
Planasa Navarra	Pamplona	Polideportivo Anaitasuna	3,000	Sergio Lamúa
Quesos Cerrato Palencia	Palencia	Pabellón Marta Domínguez	1,806	Natxo Lezkano
Ribeira Sacra Breogán Lugo	Lugo	Pazo dos Deportes	6,500	Lisardo Gómez
Unión Financiera Baloncesto Oviedo	Oviedo	Polideportivo de Pumarín	1,250	Guillermo Arenas

=== Managerial changes during the season ===
Team	Outgoing manager	Manner of departure	Date of vacancy	Replaced by	Date of appointment	Position in table
Clínicas Rincón	Francis Tomé	Sacked	27 January 2015	Paco Aurioles	28 January 2015	15th (4–14)

== Regular season ==
=== League table ===
Pos	Team	Pld	W	L	PF	PA	PD	Pts	Qualification or relegation
1	Ford Burgos (C, P)	28	22	6	2283	1875	+408	50	Promotion to Liga ACB
2	Club Ourense Baloncesto	28	20	8	2163	1897	+266	48	Qualification to promotion playoffs
3	Ribeira Sacra Breogán Lugo	28	20	8	2110	2028	+82	48	Qualification to promotion playoffs
4	MyWigo Valladolid	28	19	9	2053	1993	+60	47	Qualification to promotion playoffs
5	Palma Air Europa	28	16	12	2110	2077	+33	44	Qualification to promotion playoffs
6	Actel Força Lleida	28	16	12	1897	1910	−13	44	Qualification to promotion playoffs
7	Planasa Navarra	28	15	13	1942	1965	−23	43	Qualification to promotion playoffs
8	Quesos Cerrato Palencia (X)	28	14	14	2027	1901	+126	42	Qualification to promotion playoffs
9	Club Melilla Baloncesto	28	13	15	2030	2053	−23	41	Qualification to promotion playoffs
10	Leyma Básquet Coruña	28	12	16	1928	1996	−68	40	
11	Unión Financiera Baloncesto Oviedo	28	11	17	2108	2198	−90	39	
12	Peñas Huesca	28	9	19	2026	2160	−134	37	
13	Cocinas.com	28	9	19	2034	2202	−168	37	
14	Instituto de Fertilidad Clínicas Rincón	28	9	19	1859	2128	−269	37	
15	CB Prat Joventut (R)	28	5	23	1904	2091	−187	33	Relegation to LEB Plata

Source: Adecco Oro
(C) Champions; (P) Promoted; (R) Relegated; (X) Copa Príncipe champion

=== Results ===
Home \ Away	FLL	PRA	MEL	COB	COC	BUR	RIN	COR	VAD	PLM	PEÑ	NAV	PAL	BRE	OVI
Actel Força Lleida		81–70	75–68	72–71	74–56	72–81	65–57	69–65	59–65	73–68	66–59	77–68	76–75	73–75	67–84
CB Prat Joventut	53–59		70–65	55–56	77–72	51–77	54–66	63–69	74–60	51–62	85–74	70–69	68–73	83–86	77–81
Club Melilla Baloncesto	76–73	83–77		61–81	73–74	57–68	86–75	83–70	79–66	77–72	79–72	65–74	73–69	77–83	83–64
Club Ourense Baloncesto	68–70	67–55	80–56		71–47	61–67	74–66	73–66	68–70	76–87	86–67	89–49	63–65	73–75	94–66
Cocinas.com	69–80	87–83	72–65	76–96		68–89	67–73	64–71	87–89	73–78	104–84	63–73	95–89	79–70	78–83
Ford Burgos	89–52	76–67	89–68	91–95	105–74		88–63	81–61	83–69	99–65	74–59	88–60	85–62	93–73	109–64
Instituto de Fertilidad Clínicas Rincón	66–74	79–72	50–79	66–88	69–79	59–80		82–73	45–85	90–71	72–74	61–70	48–77	73–80	88–86
Leyma Básquet Coruña	71–64	73–62	75–65	63–70	71–66	71–68	78–57		72–61	68–77	77–74	60–62	76–73	57–62	78–84
MyWigo Valladolid	72–68	85–59	72–63	66–92	73–75	77–70	66–64	77–68		81–77	84–79	71–58	70–67	87–85	67–65
Palma Air Europa	70–62	75–73	84–88	80–87	79–65	93–88	62–76	69–63	62–75		89–74	77–56	66–58	83–70	77–64
Peñas Huesca	62–68	80–76	80–76	76–86	74–63	51–76	91–56	83–73	74–82	71–70		73–67	66–81	58–74	72–71
Planasa Navarra	51–54	71–56	72–67	80–76	79–61	72–81	68–71	85–67	69–65	67–73	78–73		80–76	68–71	78–87
Quesos Cerrato Palencia	58–46	79–77	59–62	62–64	79–61	84–54	91–59	64–46	67–76	89–66	90–74	65–79		75–50	65–73
Ribeira Sacra Breogán Lugo	77–68	85–80	86–74	68–74	72–66	68–55	70–45	67–69	80–62	94–92	78–74	63–72	74–58		88–78
Unión Financiera Baloncesto Oviedo	66–60	101–66	71–82	75–84	83–93	59–79	80–83	77–70	84–80	62–72	79–78	65–67	74–77	82–86	

Legend: Blue = home team win; Yellow = draw; Red = away team win.

== Copa Príncipe de Asturias ==
At the half of the league, the two first teams in the table play the Copa Príncipe de Asturias at home of the winner of the first half season (15th round). If this team doesn't want to host the Copa Príncipe, the second qualified can do it. If nobody wants to host it, the Federation will propose a neutral venue.

The Champion of this Cup will play the play-offs as first qualified if it finishes the league between the 2nd and the 5th qualified. The Copa Príncipe will be played on January 30, 2014.

=== Teams qualified ===
Pos	Team	Pld	W	L	PF	PA	PD	Pts
1	Quesos Cerrato Palencia	14	10	4	1036	875	+161	24
2	Ribeira Sacra Breogán Lugo	14	10	4	1046	1008	+38	24

=== The game ===
30 January 2014
21:15

Boxscore

Quesos Cerrato Palencia	78–69	Ribeira Sacra Breogán Lugo
Scoring by quarter: 21–10, 17–13, 19–23, 21–23
Pts: Forcada 19; Rebs: Arteaga 12; Asts: Forcada 7 PIR: McDowell 23		Pts: López 16; Rebs: McGhee 11; Asts: López 4 PIR: Walton 18
Quesos Cerrato Palencia, champion of the 2015 Copa Príncipe de Asturias

Polideportivo Marta Domínguez, Palencia
Referees: Morales Ruiz, Vázquez García, Zamorano Sánchez

== Playoffs ==
Quarterfinals
2	Club Ourense Baloncesto	86	81	X
9	Club Melilla Baloncesto	84	77	X
5	Palma Air Europa	52	74	X
6	Actel Força Lleida	73	89	X
3	Ribeira Sacra Breogán Lugo	91	66	88
8	Quesos Cerrato Palencia	75	81	86
4	MyWigo Valladolid	68	74	X
7	Planasa Navarra	63	73	X

Semifinals
2	Club Ourense Baloncesto	75	83	77	X	X
6	Actel Força Lleida	61	81	59	X	X
3	Ribeira Sacra Breogán Lugo	80	73	85	86	X
4	MyWigo Valladolid	65	76	77	76	X

Finals
2	Club Ourense Baloncesto	83	68	73	73	91
3	Ribeira Sacra Breogán Lugo	52	77	81	69	65

== Final standings ==
Pos.	Team	GP	W	L	Promotion or relegation
1	Ford Burgos	28	22	6	Promoted to Liga ACB
2	Club Ourense Baloncesto	38	28	10	Promoted to Liga ACB
3	Ribeira Sacra Breogán Lugo	40	27	13	
4	MyWigo Valladolid	34	22	12	
5	Actel Força Lleida	33	18	15	
6	Palma Air Europa	30	16	14	
7	Planasa Navarra	30	15	15	
8	Quesos Cerrato Palencia	31	15	16	
9	Club Melilla Baloncesto	30	13	17	
10	Leyma Básquet Coruña	28	12	16	
11	Unión Financiera Baloncesto Oviedo	28	11	17	
12	Peñas Huesca	28	9	19	
13	Cocinas.com	28	9	19	
14	Instituto Fertilidad Clínicas Rincón	28	9	19	
15	CB Prat Joventut	28	5	23	Relegated to LEB Plata

== Stats leaders in regular season ==
=== Points ===
Rk	Name	Team	Games	Points	PPG
1	(Spain) Ricardo Guillén	Instituto de Fertilidad Clínicas Rincón	25	411	16.4
2	(United States) Shawn Glover	Palma Air Europa	26	398	15.3
3	(Spain) Alfonso Sánchez	Instituto de Fertilidad Clínicas Rincón	22	281	12.8
4	(Spain) Alberto Abalde	CB Prat Joventut	22	279	12.7
5	(Georgia (country)) Beka Burjanadze	Leyma Básquet Coruña	27	342	12.7

=== Rebounds ===
Rk	Name	Team	Games	Rebounds	RPG
1	(Trinidad and Tobago) Kyle Rowley	Leyma Básquet Coruña	28	254	9.1
2	(Spain) Óliver Arteaga	Quesos Cerrato Palencia	26	199	7.6
3	(Spain) Urko Otegui	Quesos Cerrato Palencia	28	209	7.5
4	(United States) Gary McGhee	Ribeira Sacra Breogán Lugo	16	119	7.4
5	(Spain) Javier Múgica	Actel Força Lleida	28	204	7.3

=== Assists ===
Rk	Name	Team	Games	Assists	APG
1	(Spain) Mikel Uriz	MyWigo Valladolid	28	145	5.2
2	(Spain) Ferran Bassas	Unión Financiera Baloncesto Oviedo	27	130	4.8
3	(Czech Republic) Jakub Kudláček	Cocinas.com	21	101	4.8
4	(Spain) José Simeón	Actel Força Lleida	27	108	4.0
4	(Spain) Xavier Forcada	Quesos Cerrato Palencia	25	100	4.0

=== Performance Index Rating ===
Rk	Name	Team	Games	Rating	PIR
1	(Spain) Ricardo Guillén	Instituto de Fertilidad Clínicas Rincón	25	510	20.4
2	(United States) Taylor Coppenrath	Ford Burgos	28	462	16.5
3	(Spain) Álex Llorca	Ribeira Sacra Breogán Lugo	26	425	16.3
4	(Spain) Urko Otegui	Quesos Cerrato Palencia	28	422	15.1
5	(Spain) Mikel Uriz	MyWigo Valladolid	28	411	14.7

== Awards ==
=== All LEB Oro team ===
The all LEB Oro team was selected after the end of the playoffs.

- (Spain) Mikel Uriz (MyWigo Valladolid)
- (Spain) Álex Llorca (Ribeira Sacra Breogán Lugo)
- (Spain) Pablo Almazán (Planasa Navarra)
- (United States) Taylor Coppenrath (Ford Burgos)
- (Spain) Ricardo Guillén (Instituto de Fertilidad Clínicas Rincón)

=== MVP of the regular season ===
- (Spain) Ricardo Guillén (Instituto de Fertilidad Clínicas Rincón)

=== Coach of the season ===
- (Spain) Andreu Casadevall (Ford Burgos)

=== MVP of the week ===
Rk	Name	Team	PIR
1	(Spain) Álex Ros	CB Prat Joventut	30
2	(Spain) Urko Otegui	Quesos Cerrato Palencia	26
3	(Spain) Álex Llorca	Ribeira Sacra Breogán Lugo	36
4	(Spain) Javi Múgica	Actel Força Lleida	32
5	(Spain) Oliver Arteaga	Quesos Cerrato Palencia	25
6	(Spain) Mario Cabanas	Palma Air Europa	27
7	(Spain) Eduardo Hernández-Sonseca	Planasa Navarra	41
8	(Spain) Eduardo Hernández-Sonseca	Planasa Navarra	36
9	(United States) Greg Kahlig	Actel Força Lleida	32
10	(Spain) Sergi Pino	MyWigo Valladolid	30
11	(Spain) Ricardo Guillén	Instituto de Fertilidad Clínicas Rincón	35
12	(Spain) Mario Cabanas	Palma Air Europa	36
13	(Spain) Ricardo Guillén	Instituto de Fertilidad Clínicas Rincón	34
14	(Spain) Pedro Rivero	Club Ourense Baloncesto	34
15	(Spain) Eduardo Hernández-Sonseca	Planasa Navarra	35
16	(Spain) Quique Garrido (Lithuania) Tautvydas Sabonis	Club Melilla Baloncesto; Instituto Fertilidad Clínicas Rincón	28
17	(Trinidad and Tobago) Kyle Rowley	Leyma Básquet Coruña	32
18	(Spain) Ferran Bassas	Unión Financiera Baloncesto Oviedo	37
19	(Spain) Adrián Laso	Club Melilla Baloncesto	31
20	(Spain) Ricardo Guillén	Instituto de Fertilidad Clínicas Rincón	34
21	(Spain) Édgar Vicedo	Peñas Huesca	27
22	(United States) Chase Fieler	Club Ourense Baloncesto	38
23	(United States) Devin Wright	Club Melilla Baloncesto	31
24	(United States) John di Bartolomeo	Palma Air Europa	31
25	(Spain) Sergio de la Fuente	CB Valladolid	31
26	(Spain) Ricardo Guillén	Instituto de Fertilidad Clínicas Rincón	33
27	(Spain) Jorge Romero	Planasa Navarra	27
28	(Spain) Ricardo Guillén	Instituto de Fertilidad Clínicas Rincón	51
29	(Spain) Carles Bravo (Belarus) Maksim Salash	Quesos Cerrato Palencia; Peñas Huesca	27
30	(United States) Brandon Edwards	Ribeira Sacra Breogán Lugo	34
QF1	(Spain) Javi Múgica	Actel Força Lleida	41

== See also ==
- 2014–15 ACB season
- 2014–15 LEB Plata season
