= Gabrielius Maldūnas =

Lithuanian basketball player

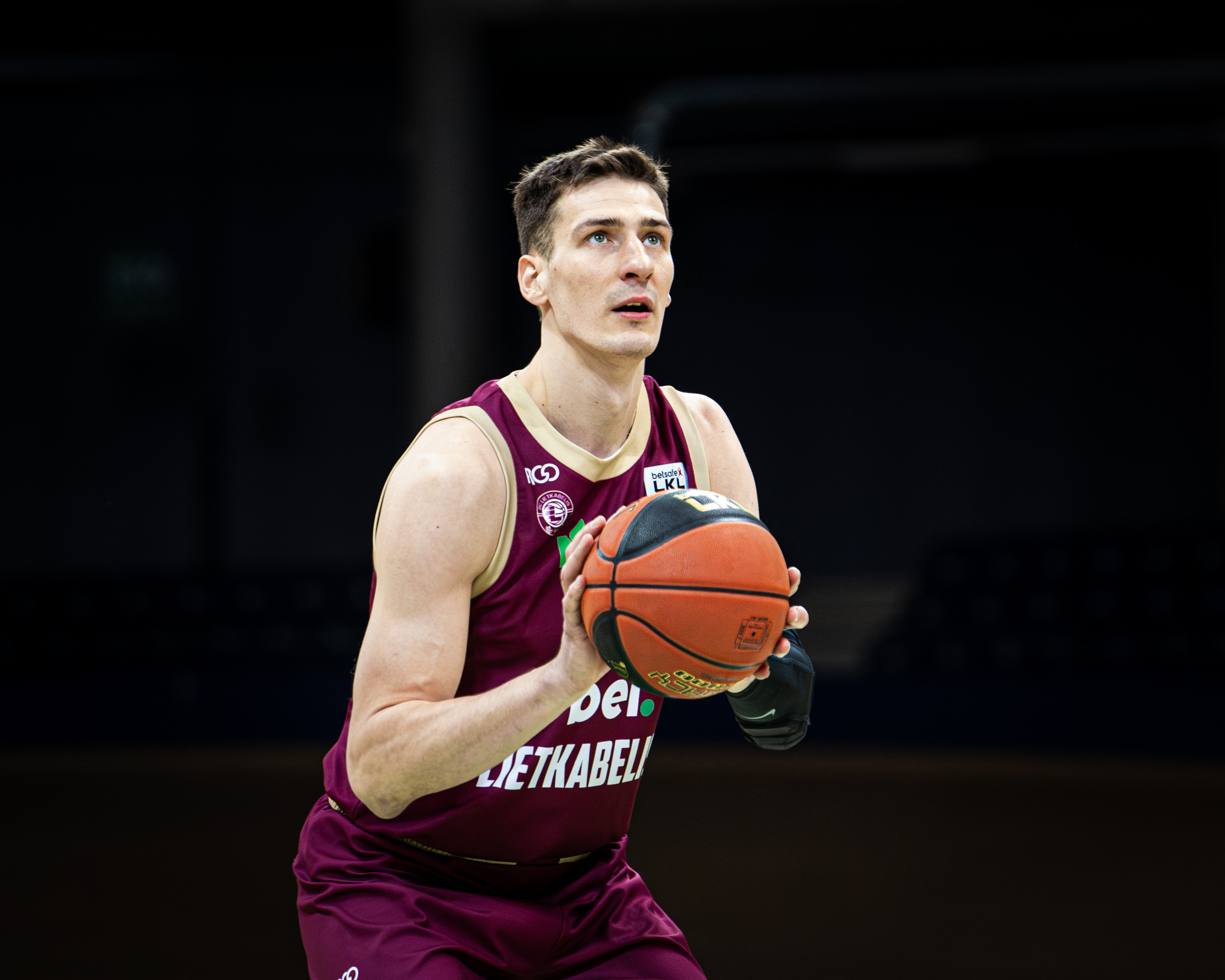
- Maldūnas with Lietkabelis in 2024

No. 12 – Lietkabelis Panevėžys
- Position: Center / power forward
- League: LKL; EuroCup

Personal information
- Born: April 19, 1993 (age 33) Panevėžys, Lithuania
- Listed height: 204 cm (6 ft 8 in)
- Listed weight: 105 kg (231 lb)

Career information
- High school: Holderness School (Holderness, New Hampshire)
- College: Dartmouth (2011–2015)
- NBA draft: 2015: undrafted
- Playing career: 2015–present

Career history
- 2015–2016: CB Peñas Huesca
- 2016–2017: Palencia Baloncesto
- 2017–2019: Nevėžis Kėdainiai
- 2019–present: Lietkabelis Panevėžys

Career highlights
- 2× Second-team All-Ivy League (2013, 2015); 3× KMT 2nd place (2021, 2022, 2024); 2× KMT 3rd place (2020, 2023); LKL 2nd place (2022); 4× LKL 3rd place (2020, 2021, 2023, 2024)

Gabrielius "Gabas" Maldūnas (born 19 April 1993) is a Lithuanian professional basketball player who plays as a center and the team captain for Lietkabelis Panevėžys of the Lithuanian Basketball League (LKL) and the EuroCup. He graduated from Dartmouth College in 2015.

== Early life ==
Maldūnas was born in Panevėžys, Lithuania where he went to school and played basketball until 2008. In the summer of 2008 he went to the US to study and play basketball at Holderness School. He played there for three years and each year his team made the NEPSAC playoffs, reaching the finals once. In his senior year of high school, Gabas was the team's captain, averaging 18 points and 8 rebounds.

== College career ==
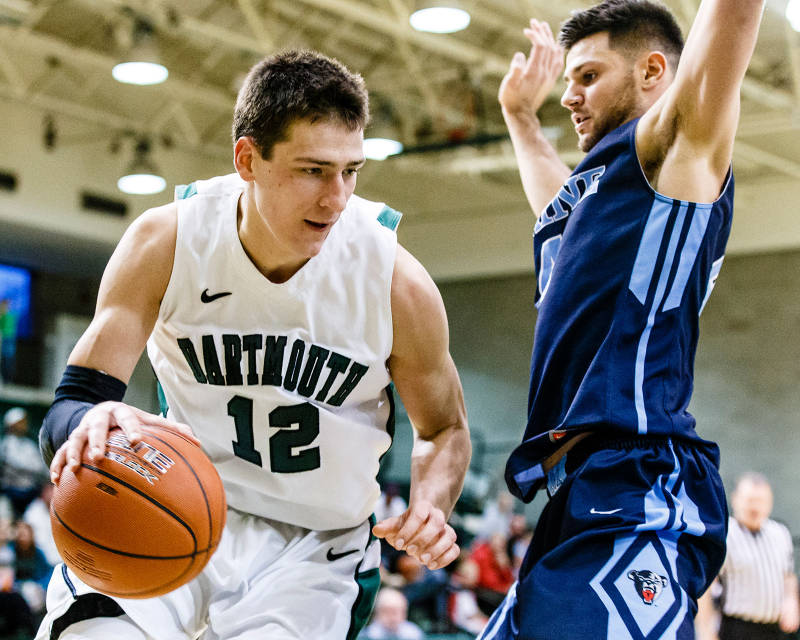
Maldunas playing for the Big Green

Maldūnas had a very successful career at Dartmouth College, appearing in 102 games for the Big Green. He is one of four Ivy League players to ever score 1,000 points, and record over 700 rebounds, 100 assists, 100 blocks and 100 steals.

During his sophomore year Gabas was selected to the All-Ivy second team. He continued playing strong during his junior year, but his season was cut short due to an ACL injury on January 20, 2014.

He came back for his senior year and helped the Big Green achieve their best record since 1998–1999 season. He was selected to the All-Ivy second team for the second time in his career along with his teammate Alex Mitola. Maldunas' game-winning shot in the last game of the season against Yale was on SC Top 10 and it helped the Big Green to get invited to the first post season tournament since 1959. However, they lost to Canisius in the first round of the CIT Tournament.

Gabas finished his Dartmouth career 22nd on the scoring list, 3rd in career blocked shots and 4th in rebounds. He was the first Dartmouth player in 56 years to record 1,000 points and 700 rebounds and only the second ever to record 100 career blocks and 100 steals.

In June 2015 he graduated with an Economics degree and went on to play professional basketball in Europe.

== Professional career ==
=== CB Peñas Huesca ===
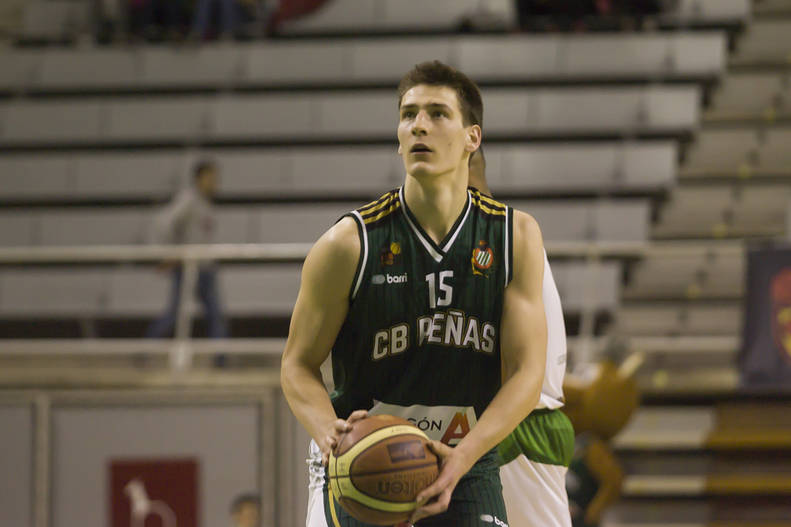
Maldunas shooting a free throw while playing for the CB Peñas Huesca in 2016

On 28 August 2015, Maldūnas signed to play in the second-tier league in Spain for CB Peñas Huesca.

During the regular season he averaged 10 points and 6.6 rebounds while helping a very young and inexperienced Peñas team record 16 wins and 14 losses and make the playoffs as the 7th seed.

In the playoffs the Peñas made it all the way to the finals after beating Oviedo CB 3–1 in the first round and CB Miraflores also 3–1 in the semifinals. However, the team lost the final series 3–0 to Club Melilla Baloncesto.

=== Palencia Baloncesto ===
On 7 July 2016, Maldūnas signed with the 2016 LEB Oro champions Palencia Baloncesto. He led his team to the finals by scoring 20 points and getting 8 rebounds in the series deciding game against Oviedo CB. The team lost in the finals to CB Miraflores.

=== Nevėžis Kėdainiai ===
On 4 August 2017, Maldūnas signed with Nevėžis Kėdainiai of the Lithuanian Basketball League (LKL). The team finished in 8th place in 2017–18 LKL season and lost to BC Žalgiris in the first round of the playoffs. In 2018–19 LKL season the team finished in 9th place.

=== Lietkabelis Panevėžys ===
On 11 July 2019, Maldūnas signed with Lietkabelis Panevėžys of the Lithuanian Basketball League (LKL). The team finished in third place in 2019–20 LKL season and also won bronze medal in King Mindaugas Cup. The team also made it to the playoffs of the Basketball Champions League. On 7 July 2022, Maldūnas signed a two-year contract extension with the club.

On 25 January 2025, Maldūnas missed the first game of his professional career due to a shoulder injury, ending a streak of 516 consecutive games played.

== National team career ==
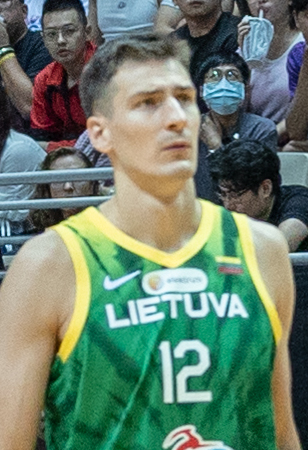
Maldūnas with the Lithuania men's national team in 2023

After playing for the senior Lithuania men's national basketball team in the 2023 FIBA Basketball World Cup qualification, in 2023 Maldūnas debuted in the first major FIBA tournament with the senior Lithuania men's national basketball team during the 2023 FIBA Basketball World Cup and averaged 0.9 points, 1.7 rebounds, 0.6 assists per game.

Maldūnas also represented the Lithuania men's national team in the EuroBasket 2025 qualification.

== Personal life ==
While at Dartmouth, Maldunas was a member of Beta Alpha Omega fraternity and Sphinx Senior Society.

== Career statistics ==
Legend
GP	Games played	GS	Games started	MPG	Minutes per game
FG%	Field-goal percentage	3P%	3-point field-goal percentage	FT%	Free-throw percentage
RPG	Rebounds per game	APG	Assists per game	SPG	Steals per game
BPG	Blocks per game	PPG	Points per game	PIR	Performance index rating
**Bold**	Career high

=== EuroCup ===
Year	Team	GP	GS	MPG	FG%	3P%	FT%	RPG	APG	SPG	BPG	PPG	PIR
2020–21	Lietkabelis Panevėžys	10	4	19.6	.526	.000	.545	**5.3**	1.6	1.3	**.5**	4.6	8.8
2021–22	Lietkabelis Panevėžys	**19**	5	17.9	.560	.000	.579	4.0	.9	1.2	.3	5.0	6.9
2022–23	Lietkabelis Panevėžys	**19**	6	19.1	**.590**	.000	.444	4.3	1.4	.9	.1	5.6	8.0
2023–24	Lietkabelis Panevėžys	18	**7**	**20.5**	.545	**.667**	**.636**	4.9	**1.7**	.9	.2	**7.6**	**10.3**
2024–25	Lietkabelis Panevėžys	17	6	19.3	.430	.000	.600	4.8	1.2	**1.6**	.1	4.9	6.1
2025–26	Lietkabelis Panevėžys	18	1	16.8	.472	.000	.633	3.7	1.6	.8	.1	3.8	7.6
Career		101	29	18.8	.524	.222	.583	4.4	1.4	1.1	.2	5.3	7.9
