= CB Peñas Huesca =

- Leagues: LEB Plata
- Founded: 1977
- History: CD Peñas Recreativas de Huesca (1977–1996); CB Peñas Huesca (1996–present)
- Arena: Palacio Municipal de los Deportes
- Location: Huesca, Spain
- Team colors: Green and white
- President: Antonio Orús
- Head coach: (Spain) Santi Cerdán Cerigüel
- Championships: 1 Copa LEB Plata; 1 Liga EBA Championship
- Website: cbphuesca.com
| Home | Away |

Club Baloncesto Peñas Huesca is a Spanish professional basketball team based in Huesca, Aragón, Spain. The team is also known as CB Peñas Huesca and Lobe Huesca La Magia. The team currently plays in league LEB Plata.

== History ==
The team played in Liga ACB, where they stayed from 1983 to 1996. After winning the relegation play-off, the sold their spot in the league to Baloncesto Fuenlabrada and they joined the new second-tier league, Liga LEB. One year later, the club left the league and started to play from the lowest divisions.

14 years later, CB Peñas came back to LEB Oro league (second tier) after winning a Liga EBA (champions of the Final Eight played in Palencia), a Copa LEB Plata against CD Huelva Baloncesto (89–67) and being runner-up of the league in the 2009–10 season, beating in the last playoffs series CB Tíjola.

In 2016, Peñas reached the finals of the promotion playoffs, but lost 0–3 in the series to Club Melilla Baloncesto.

== Sponsorship naming ==
During all its history, CB Peñas Huesca had several denominations by sponsorship reasons:

- Magia de Huesca: 1985–1990
- Huesca La Magia: 1990–1992
- Argal Huesca: 1992–1994
- Somontano Huesca: 1994–1995
- AGB Huesca: 1995–1996
- Iberagentes Huesca: 2000–2002

- CAI Huesca: 2002–2004
- CAI Huesca La Magia: 2004–2007
- CAI Huesca Cosarsa: 2007–2008
- Lobe Huesca: 2008–2013
- Magia Huesca: 2016–2017
- Levitec Huesca: 2017–present

== Players ==
=== Current roster ===
Note: Flags indicate national team eligibility at FIBA-sanctioned events. Players may hold other non-FIBA nationalities not displayed.

Levitec Huesca roster
Players
Coaches

| Pos. | No. | Nat. | Name | Ht. | Age |
|---|---|---|---|---|---|
| C | | (Democratic Republic of the Congo) | Bakumanya, Gracin | 2.11 m (6 ft 11 in) | 29 – 27 July 1997 |
| G | | (Spain) | Alonso, Ayoze | 1.87 m (6 ft 2 in) | 35 – 4 April 1991 |
| F | | (Spain) | Fernandez, Jaime | 2.03 m (6 ft 8 in) | 26 – 15 July 2000 |
| SF | 7 | (Spain) | Lafuente, Jorge | 1.97 m (6 ft 6 in) | 35 – 26 July 1991 |
| G | | (Nigeria) | Omoerah, Keith | 1.96 m (6 ft 5 in) | 34 – 22 March 1992 |
| F/C | | (Spain) | Etxeguren, Aitor | 2.05 m (6 ft 9 in) | 23 – 22 November 2002 |
| SF | 9 | (Spain) | Urdiain, Ander | 2.03 m (6 ft 8 in) | 25 – 16 November 2000 |
| PG | 77 | (Netherlands) | van Oostrum, Devon | 1.93 m (6 ft 4 in) | 33 – 24 January 1993 |

Head coach

- (Spain) David Gómez

Legend

- (C) Team captain
- Injured

=== Depth chart ===
| Pos. | Starting 5 | Bench 1 | Bench 2 |
|---|---|---|---|
| C | Emmanuel Omogbo | Will Butler | Ramon Vila |
| PF | Ignacio Rosa | Mike Moore |
| SF | Jorge Lafuente | Ander Urdiain | Nacho Giráldez |
| SG | Luis Parejo | Kimbal Mackenzie |
| PG | Devon van Oostrum | Jacob Round |

Colours: Blue = homegrown player; Red = non-FIBA Europe player

== Season by season ==
| Season | Tier | Division | Pos. | W–L | Copa del Rey | Other cups | |
|---|---|---|---|---|---|---|---|
| 1977–78 | 3 | 3ª División | 6th | 16–10 | | | |
| 1978–79 | 3 | 2ª División | 8th | | | | |
| 1979–80 | 3 | 2ª División | 6th | | | | |
| 1980–81 | 3 | 2ª División | 3rd | 17–1–6 | | | |
| 1981–82 | 3 | 2ª División | 2nd | | | | |
| 1982–83 | 2 | 1ª División B | 4th | 15–2–9 | | | |
| 1983–84 | 1 | Liga ACB | 14th | 10–24 | | | |
| 1984–85 | 2 | 1ª División B | 1st | 19–7 | | | |
| 1985–86 | 1 | Liga ACB | 13th | 13–21 | | | |
| 1986–87 | 1 | Liga ACB | 12th | 13–17 | | Copa Príncipe | R16 |
| 1987–88 | 1 | Liga ACB | 10th | 8–22 | Quarterfinalist | Copa Príncipe | R16 |
| 1988–89 | 1 | Liga ACB | 13th | 15–26 | Quarterfinalist | | |
| 1989–90 | 1 | Liga ACB | 14th | 24–16 | First round | | |
| 1990–91 | 1 | Liga ACB | 15th | 19–19 | First round | | |
| 1991–92 | 1 | Liga ACB | 17th | 20–21 | Second round | | |
| 1992–93 | 1 | Liga ACB | 19th | 14–21 | First round | | |
| 1993–94 | 1 | Liga ACB | 20th (Note: Remained in ACB due to the dissolution of CB Llíria.) | 10–22 | First round | | |
| 1994–95 | 1 | Liga ACB | 18th | 15–27 | | | |
| 1995–96 | 1 | Liga ACB | 18th (Note: Sold the ACB berth to Baloncesto Fuenlabrada.) | 12–30 | | | |
| 1996–97 | 2 | LEB | 12th (Note: Resigned to its berth in LEB.) | 8–21 | | | |
| 1997–98 | Did not enter any competition | | | | | | |
| 1998–99 | 3 | Liga EBA | 14th (Note: Remained in the league after achieving a vacant berth.) | 10–24 | | | |
| 1999–00 | 3 | Liga EBA | 14th | 7–19 | | | |
| 2000–01 | 4 | Liga EBA | 5th | 17–13 | | | |
| 2001–02 | 4 | Liga EBA | 8th | 17–15 | | | |
| 2002–03 | 4 | Liga EBA | 2nd | 26–8 | | | |
| 2003–04 | 4 | Liga EBA | 3rd | 23–9 | | | |
| 2004–05 | 4 | Liga EBA | 1st | 31–4 | | | |
| 2005–06 | 3 | LEB 2 | 5th | 21–14 | | Copa LEB 2 | RU |
| 2006–07 | 3 | LEB 2 | 16th | 16–22 | | | |
| 2007–08 | 3 | LEB Plata | 8th | 20–17 | | | |
| 2008–09 | 3 | LEB Plata | 11th | 14–16 | | | |
| 2009–10 | 3 | LEB Plata | 2nd | 32–13 | | Copa LEB Plata | C |
| 2010–11 | 2 | LEB Oro | 15th | 12–22 | | | |
| 2011–12 | 2 | LEB Oro | 15th | 13–21 | | | |
| 2012–13 | 2 | LEB Oro | 8th | 12–18 | | | |
| 2013–14 | 2 | LEB Oro | 7th | 14–15 | | | |
| 2014–15 | 2 | LEB Oro | 12th | 9–19 | | | |
| 2015–16 | 2 | LEB Oro | 3rd | 22–19 | | | |
| 2016–17 | 2 | LEB Oro | 16th | 11–23 | | | |
| 2017–18 | 2 | LEB Oro | 15th | 13–21 | | | |
| 2018–19 | 2 | LEB Oro | 10th | 18–16 | | | |
| 2019–20 | 2 | LEB Oro | 14th (Note: Season curtailed due to the COVID-19 pandemic.) | 9–15 | | | |
| 2020–21 | 2 | LEB Oro | 13th | 10–16 | | | |
| 2021–22 | 2 | LEB Oro | 18th | 5–29 | | | |
| 2022–23 | 3 | LEB Plata | 20th | 9–17 | | | |
| 2022–23 | 3 | LEB Plata | 19th | 10–16 | | | |
| 2024–25 | 3 | LEB Plata | 5th | 19–13 | | Spain Cup | GS |
| 2025–26 | 3 | LEB Plata | 14th | 14–14 | | Spain Cup | R16 |
| 2026–27 | 3 | LEB Plata | | | | Spain Cup | GS |

== Trophies and awards ==
=== Trophies ===
- 2nd division championships: (2)
  - 1ª División B: (1) 1985
- Copa LEB Plata: (1)
  - 2010

=== Individual awards ===
All LEB Oro Team

- Marius Grigonis – 2014

== Notable players ==
To appear in this section a player must have either:

– Set a club record or won an individual award as a professional player.
– Played at least one official international match for his senior national team.

- (Lithuania) Marius Grigonis
- (Lithuania) Rimas Kurtinaitis
- (Lithuania) Tadas Sedekerskis
- (Lithuania) Gabrielius Maldūnas
- (North Macedonia) Stojan Gjuroski
- (Uganda) Robinson Opong
- (United States) Alphonso Ford
- (Spain) Santiago Aldama
