= Jeff Xavier =

Cape Verdean basketball player (born 1985)

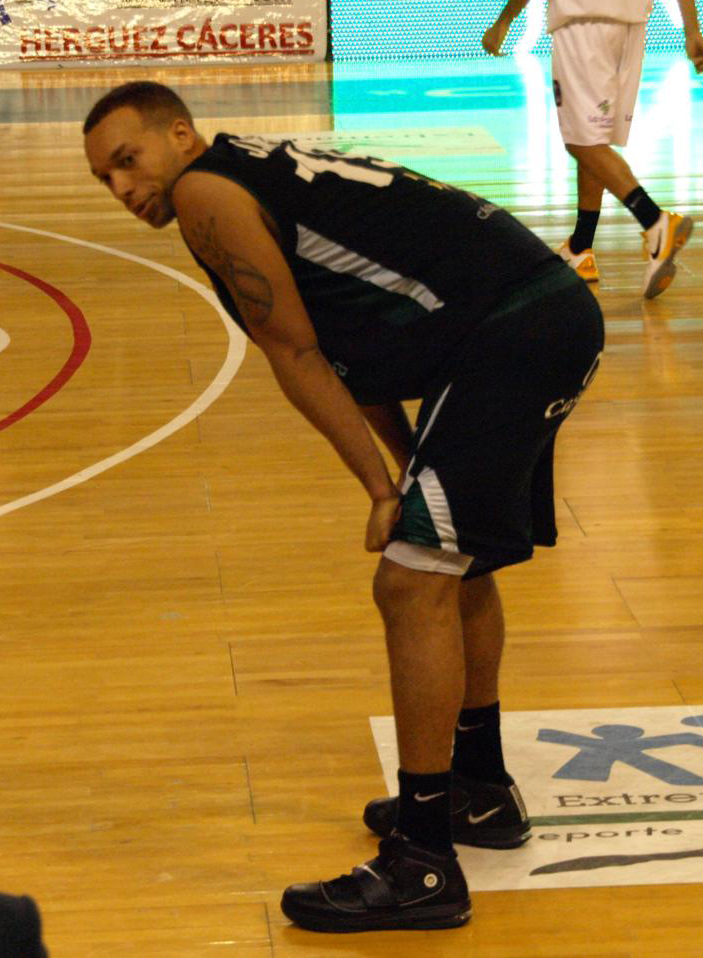

Personal information
- Born: September 7, 1985 (age 41) Pawtucket, Rhode Island, U.S.
- Listed height: 1.86 m (6 ft 1 in)

Career information
- High school: St. Raphael Academy (Pawtucket, Rhode Island)
- College: Manhattan (2004–2006); Providence (2007–2009)
- NBA draft: 2009: undrafted
- Playing career: 2009–2022
- Position: Point guard / shooting guard
- Coaching career: 2025–present

Career history

Playing
- 2009–2010: Breogán
- 2010–2011: Cáceres
- 2011–2012: Palencia
- 2012–2013: Atapuerca Burgos
- 2013–2015: Ford Burgos
- 2015–2016: medi Bayreuth
- 2016: Breogán
- 2016–2017: FC Porto
- 2017–2018: UJAP Quimper 29
- 2018–2020: Básquet Coruña
- 2020–2021: Cáceres
- 2021–2022: Oviedo CB

Coaching
- 2025–present: New England Lightning (ABA)

Career highlights
- All-LEB Oro Team (2016); Second-team All-MAAC (2006)

Jeffrey G. Xavier (born 7 September 1985) is a former Cape Verdean basketball player, and current head coach of the New England Lightning of the American Basketball Association.

== Background ==
Born in the United States, he represented Cape Verde internationally.

He is a graduate of St. Raphael Academy in Pawtucket, and a 2009 graduate of Providence College.

== Professional career ==
In 2009–10 season he signed with Leche Río Breogán, team of LEB Oro. In the next season, he went to Cáceres Ciudad del Baloncesto of the same league. In 2011, Xavier signed with his third LEB Oro team in three seasons: Palencia Baloncesto.

== National team career ==
Xavier is a member of the Cape Verde national basketball team and played with them at the AfroBasket 2021 qualifiers.

== Coaching career ==
Xavier has been head coach of the New England Lightning of the American Basketball Association since 2025.

== Trophies ==
CB Atapuerca

- LEB Oro: (1) 2012–13
- Copa Príncipe de Asturias: (1) 2013

== Career statistics ==
Legend
| GP | Games played | GS | Games started | MPG | Minutes per game |
| FG% | Field goal percentage | 3P% | 3-point field goal percentage | FT% | Free throw percentage |
| RPG | Rebounds per game | APG | Assists per game | SPG | Steals per game |
| BPG | Blocks per game | PPG | Points per game | **Bold** | Career high |

=== College ===
| Year | Team | GP | GS | MPG | FG% | 3P% | FT% | RPG | APG | SPG | BPG | PPG |
|---|---|---|---|---|---|---|---|---|---|---|---|---|
| 2004–05 | Manhattan | 29 | 17 | 19.3 | **.441** | **.369** | .769 | 2.7 | .8 | 1.4 | .2 | 7.8 |
| 2005–06 | Manhattan | 31 | **30** | **34.8** | .434 | .350 | .798 | **5.9** | 1.9 | **2.3** | .2 | **16.6** |
| 2006–07 | Providence | Transfer | | | | | | | | | | |
| 2007–08 | Providence | 31 | **30** | 31.6 | .404 | .364 | .768 | 3.6 | **2.5** | **2.3** | **.3** | 12.4 |
| 2008–09 | Providence | **33** | 26 | 24.5 | .356 | .291 | **.800** | 3.0 | 1.9 | 1.4 | .1 | 9.3 |
| Career | | 124 | 103 | 27.6 | .408 | .342 | .788 | 3.8 | 1.8 | 1.8 | .2 | 11.5 |
