= Morgan Stilma =

Dutch-Spanish basketball player

No. 33 – Club Melilla Baloncesto
- Position: Center
- League: Primera FEB

Personal information
- Born: 19 June 2000 (age 26) Marbella, Spain
- Listed height: 2.03 m (6 ft 8 in)
- Listed weight: 100 kg (220 lb)

Career information
- Playing career: 2018–present

Career history
- 2018–2020: Málaga
- 2019–2020: Villarrobledo
- 2020–2022: Heroes Den Bosch
- 2022–2023: Zamora
- 2023–2024: Zornotza
- 2024–present: Melilla

Career highlights
- Dutch national champion (2022)
Medals
Men's basketball
Representing the Netherlands
FIBA Europe U18 Championship Division B
Gold medal – first place	2018	National team

Morgan Stilma (born 19 June 2000) is a Dutch-Spanish basketball player for Club Melilla Baloncesto of the Spanish Primera FEB. Standing at 203 cm (6 ft 8 in), he plays as center.

== Early career ==
Stilma was born in Marbella, Spain to a Dutch father and Italian mother. He played for the junior teams of Fuengirola and Baloncesto Málaga.

== Professional career ==
In the 2018–19 season, Stilma made his debut for Baloncesto Málaga in the Liga ACB, playing 5 games. In the 2019–20 season, he played in one ACB and two EuroCup games with the team. He also played 10 games in the LEB Plata with Villarrobledo.

On 26 June 2020, Stilma signed a three-year contract with Heroes Den Bosch in the Netherlands. He won the 2021–22 Dutch national championship with Heroes. After the season, the club decided to dissolve his contract.

On 18 July 2022, Stilma signed with CB Zamora, returning to the LEB Plata for a second stint in the league.

In July 2024, he signed for Club Melilla Baloncesto of the Spanish Primera FEB, the second tier of Spanish basketball.

== National team career ==
Stilma played with the Netherlands under-18 national team and helped his country win the gold medal at 2018 FIBA Europe Under-18 Championship Division B in Skopje.
