= Alonzo Verge Jr. =

American basketball player (born 1998)

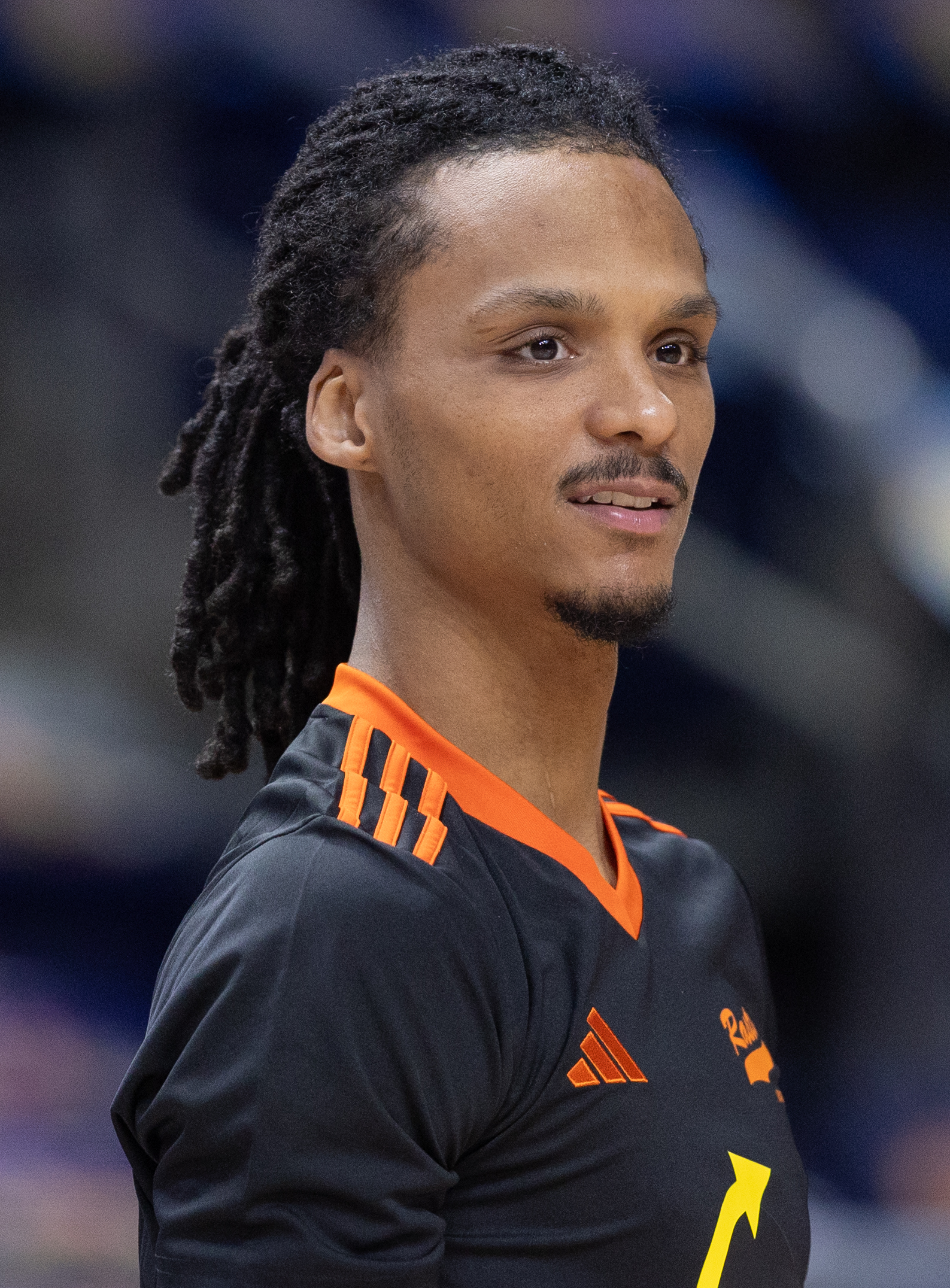
- Verge with Rasta Vechta in 2026

No. 1 – Básquet Coruña
- Position: Point guard / shooting guard
- League: Liga ACB

Personal information
- Born: October 17, 1998 (age 28) Aurora, Illinois, U.S.
- Listed height: 6 ft 3 in (1.91 m)
- Listed weight: 165 lb (75 kg)

Career information
- High school: Willowbrook (Villa Park, Illinois); Arlington Country Day (Jacksonville, Florida); Thornton (Harvey, Illinois)
- College: Moberly Area CC (2017–2019); Arizona State (2019–2021); Nebraska (2021–2022)
- NBA draft: 2022: undrafted
- Playing career: 2022–2022

Career history
- 2022–2023: MKS Dąbrowa Górnicza
- 2023: Apollon Patras
- 2023: Al-Rayyan Doha
- 2023–2024: Golden Eagle Ylli
- 2024–2025: Balıkesir Buüyükşehir Belediyespor
- 2025: Básquet Coruña
- 2025–2026: Rasta Vechta
- 2026–present: Básquet Coruña

Career highlights
- Pac-12 Sixth Man of the Year (2020); First-team NJCAA DI All-American (2019); Second-team NJCAA DI All-American (2018); MCCAC Player of the Year (2019); 2× First-team All-MCCAC (2018, 2019)

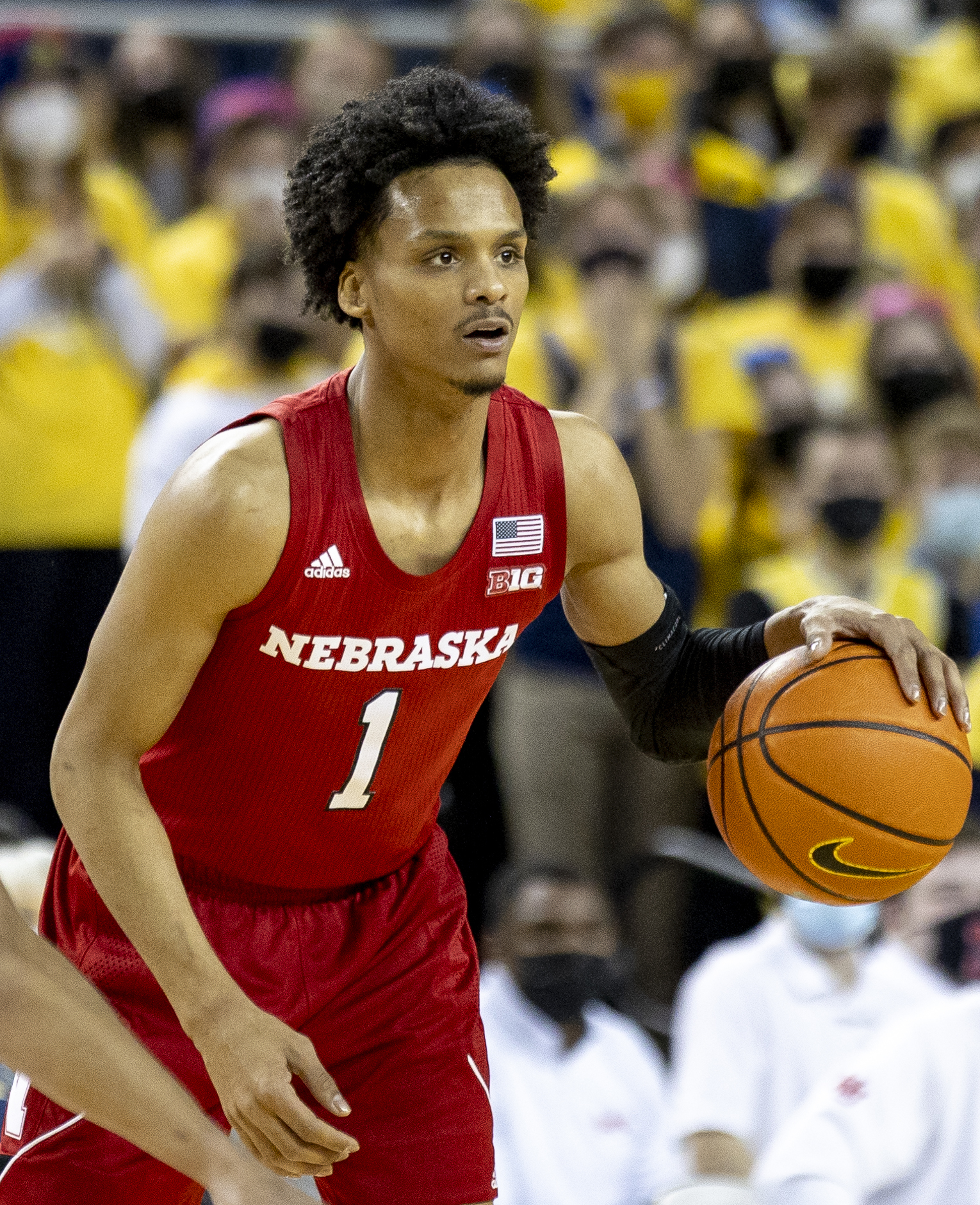
Verge with Nebraska in 2022

Alonzo Verge Jr. (born October 17, 1998) is an American professional basketball player for Básquet Coruña of the Liga ACB. He played college basketball for the Moberly Area CC Greyhounds, Arizona State Sun Devils and Nebraska Cornhuskers.

== Early life and high school career ==
Verge was born in Aurora, Illinois, and grew up in Hillside and Bellwood. He attended Willowbrook High School in Villa Park, Illinois for his first two years. Verge did not play basketball as a freshman in order to focus on academics. As a sophomore, he averaged 23 points, five rebounds, three assists and four steals per game, leading his team to its first conference title since 1972, but was suspended for the playoffs. Verge planned to transfer to Proviso West High School in Hillside; due to eligibility issues, he instead transferred to Arlington Country Day School in Jacksonville, Florida for his junior season, playing alongside Luguentz Dort.

As a senior, Verge transferred to Thornton Township High School in Harvey, Illinois. He recorded 43 points, 11 rebounds, six assists and five steals in an 81–70 win over Bloom High School at the Class 4A Richards Regional title game. He averaged 26 points, eight rebounds and seven assists per game and was named Chicago Sun-Times Player of the Year. Verge competed for the St. Louis Eagles on the Nike EYBL circuit, playing alongside Jayson Tatum, Tyler Cook and Jeremiah Tilmon. He did not have any NCAA Division I offers out of high school due to academic struggles.

== College career ==
=== Moberly Community College ===
Verge was suspended for five games during his freshman season at Moberly Area Community College for a violation of team rules. He averaged 20.8 points, 6.1 assists, 4.1 rebounds and two steals per game as a freshman, collecting Second Team National Junior College Athletic Association (NJCAA) Division I All-American and First Team All-Missouri Community College Athletic Conference (MCCAC) accolades. On November 9, 2018, Verge posted a career-high 55 points, breaking his own school record, six rebounds and five steals in a 106–65 win over Kennedy–King College. As a sophomore, he averaged a nation-leading 30.9 points, 8.2 assists, 4.2 rebounds and 2.4 steals per game. Verge set single-season and career program records for scoring and assists. He earned First Team NJCAA Division I All-American honors, joining Eddie Smith as the only two-time NJCAA All-Americans in program history. He was named MCCAC Player of the Year and was a First Team All-MCCAC selection for his second season.

=== Arizona State ===
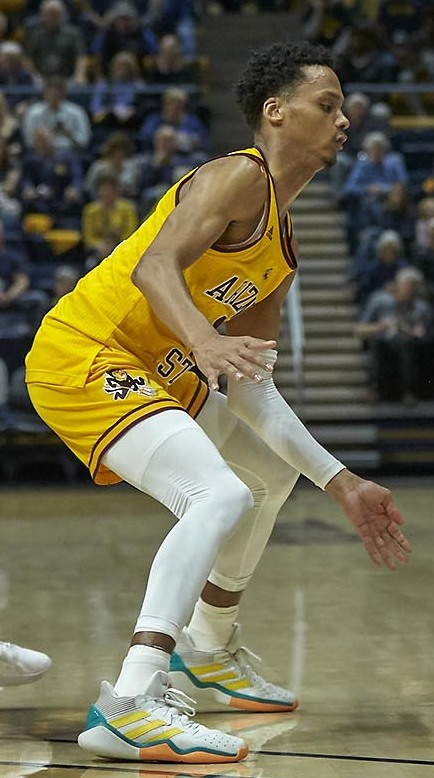
Verge with Arizona State in 2020

On October 2, 2018, Verge committed to Arizona State. He sprained his right wrist after his season debut and missed three games after reaggravating the injury in practice, as he did not inform the coaching staff of the initial injury. Partially as a result, Verge missed his first 13 three-point attempts. On December 18, 2019, Verge scored a junior season-high 43 points off the bench in a 96–56 loss to Saint Mary's. He recorded the fourth-most single-game points in program history and the fourth-most single-game points by a bench player in NCAA Division I history. As a junior, Verge averaged 14.6 points, 3.5 rebounds and 2.3 assists per game, leading the Division I in bench scoring. He was named Pac-12 Sixth Man of the Year and All-Pac-12 Honorable Mention. Verge declared for the 2020 NBA draft before withdrawing his name and opting to return to Arizona State. As a senior, he averaged 14 points and 3.8 assists per game. Following the season, Verge declared for the 2021 NBA draft and entered the transfer portal.

=== Nebraska ===
Verge ultimately withdrew from the NBA draft and transferred to Nebraska for his final season of eligibility.

== Professional career ==
=== MKS Dabrowa Gornicza (2022–2023) ===
On August 8, 2022, Verge signed with MKS Dąbrowa Górnicza of the Polish Basketball League (PLK). In 11 games, he averaged 18.8 points, 3.4 assists, 4.5 rebounds, 1.6 steals and 3.2 turnovers, playing around 27 minutes per contest.

=== AS Apollon Patras (2023) ===
On January 16, 2023, Verge moved to Greek club Apollon Patras for the rest of the season. In 11 league games, he averaged 13.5 points, 7 assists, 3.5 rebounds and 1.2 steals, playing around 25 minutes per contest.

=== Golden Eagle Ylli (2023–2024) ===
On December 19, 2023, Verge signed for the Kosovan club Golden Eagle Ylli. He averaged 24.2 points per game in the 2023–24 Superleague season.

On March 9, 2024, Verge was awarded the Hoops Agents Player of the Week award for Round 23. He had a game high 21 points and 7 assists. On March 12, 2024, Verge was awarded again the Hoops Agents Player of the Week award for Round 24. He had 37 points, 5 rebounds and 8 assists for his team's victory.

After the season, Verge was awarded All-Kosovo League First Team and All-Imports Team.

=== Yalova Belediye Spor (2024) ===
On August 21, 2024, he signed with Yalovaspor of the Basketbol Süper Ligi (BSL).

=== Balıkesir Buüyükşehir Belediyespor (2024–2025) ===
On October 17, 2024, Verge signed with Balikesir Buyuksehir Belediyespor of the Turkish Basketball Second League.

On March 11, 2025, Verge was awarded a Hoops Agents Player of the Week award for Round 28. He had a triple-double of 24 points, 12 rebounds, and 18 assists.

=== Básquet Coruña (2025) ===
On May 14 Verge signed with Básquet Coruña of the Liga ACB.

=== Rasta Vechta (2025–2026) ===
On July 21, 2025, he signed with Rasta Vechta of the Basketball Bundesliga (BBL). On January 7, 2026, Verge received a Hoops Agents Player of the Week award. He had the game-high 26 points, 5 rebounds and 7 assists for the teams win.

=== Básquet Coruña (2026–present) ===
On July 15, 2026, Verge returned to Básquet Coruña of the Liga ACB.

== Career statistics ==
Legend
GP	Games played	GS	Games started	MPG	Minutes per game
FG%	Field goal percentage	3P%	3-point field goal percentage	FT%	Free throw percentage
RPG	Rebounds per game	APG	Assists per game	SPG	Steals per game
BPG	Blocks per game	PPG	Points per game	**Bold**	Career high

=== College ===
==== NCAA Division I ====
Year	Team	GP	GS	MPG	FG%	3P%	FT%	RPG	APG	SPG	BPG	PPG
2019–20	Arizona State	**28**	9	26.8	.438	.289	.737	3.5	2.3	1.4	.1	**14.6**
2020–21	Arizona State	23	21	**29.8**	.391	**.333**	**.809**	3.9	3.8	1.2	**.2**	14.0
2021–22	Nebraska	31	**31**	28.4	**.456**	.315	.770	**4.5**	**5.5**	**1.6**	**.2**	14.5
Career		82	61	28.2	.431	.313	.771	4.0	3.9	1.4	.2	14.4

==== JUCO ====
Year	Team	GP	GS	MPG	FG%	3P%	FT%	RPG	APG	SPG	BPG	PPG
2017–18	Moberly Area CC	25	13	–	**.558**	.320	.750	4.1	6.1	2.0	.2	20.8
2018–19	Moberly Area CC	**35**	**33**	–	.488	**.418**	**.759**	**4.2**	**8.2**	**2.4**	**.5**	**30.9**
Career		60	46	–	.510	.392	.756	4.2	7.3	2.2	.4	26.7

== Personal life ==
His father, Alonzo Verge Sr., played basketball for Proviso West High School in Hillside, where he earned All-State and All-Area honors. In 2024, he converted to Islam in Therandë.
