= Augustas Pečiukevičius =

Lithuanian basketball player (born 1991)

Free Agent
- Position: Point guard / shooting guard

Personal information
- Born: 2 December 1991 (age 34) Vilnius, Lithuania
- Listed height: 1.93 m (6.3 ft)
- Listed weight: 94 kg (207 lb)

Career information
- NBA draft: 2013: undrafted
- Playing career: 2007–present

Career history
- 2009–2010: Aisčiai Kaunas
- 2010–2012: Sakalai Vilnius
- 2012–2013: KK Pärnu
- 2013–2015: Tartu Ülikool Korvpallimeeskond
- 2015–2016: San Pablo Inmobiliaria Burgos
- 2016–2019: Excelsior Brussels
- 2019–2022: Básquet Coruña
- 2022–2023: Club Ourense Baloncesto
- 2023–2026: Kangoeroes Mechelen

Career highlights
- BNXT League champion (2025); Estonian Basketball Cup MVP Award (2013)
Medals
Men's basketball
Representing Lithuania
FIBA Europe Under-18 Championship
Silver medal – second place	2008 Greece	U-18 Team
FIBA Europe Under-16 Championship
Bronze medal – third place	2007 Greece	U-16 Team

Augustas Pečiukevičius (born 2 December 1991) is a Lithuanian professional basketball player who last played for Kangoeroes Mechelen of the BNXT League. He plays the point guard and shooting guard positions.

== Professional career ==
On 19 August 2021 Pečiukevičius signed with Básquet Coruña.

== International career ==
Pečiukevičius represented the Lithuanian youth squads twice. He won bronze medal with the U-16 National Team in 2007 FIBA Europe Under-16 Championship and silver medal with the U-18 National Team in 2008 FIBA Europe Under-18 Championship.
