= Pablo Almazán =

Spanish basketball player

No. 8 – San Pablo Burgos
- Position: Small forward
- League: Liga ACB; EuroCup

Personal information
- Born: 15 January 1989 (age 37) Granada, Spain
- Listed height: 6 ft 7 in (2.01 m)

Career information
- NBA draft: 2011: undrafted
- Playing career: 2010–present

Career history
- 2010–2011: Unicaja Malaga
- 2011–2012: CAI Zaragoza
- 2012–2013: Leyma Natura Coruna
- 2013–2014: Leche Río Breogán
- 2014–2015: Planasa Navarra
- 2015–2018: Melilla
- 2018–2024: Coosur Real Betis
- 2024–present: San Pablo Burgos

Pablo Almazán (born 9 February 1989) is a Spanish professional basketball player who plays for San Pablo Burgos of the Spanish Liga ACB as a small forward.
