= Anton Maresch =

Austrian basketball player

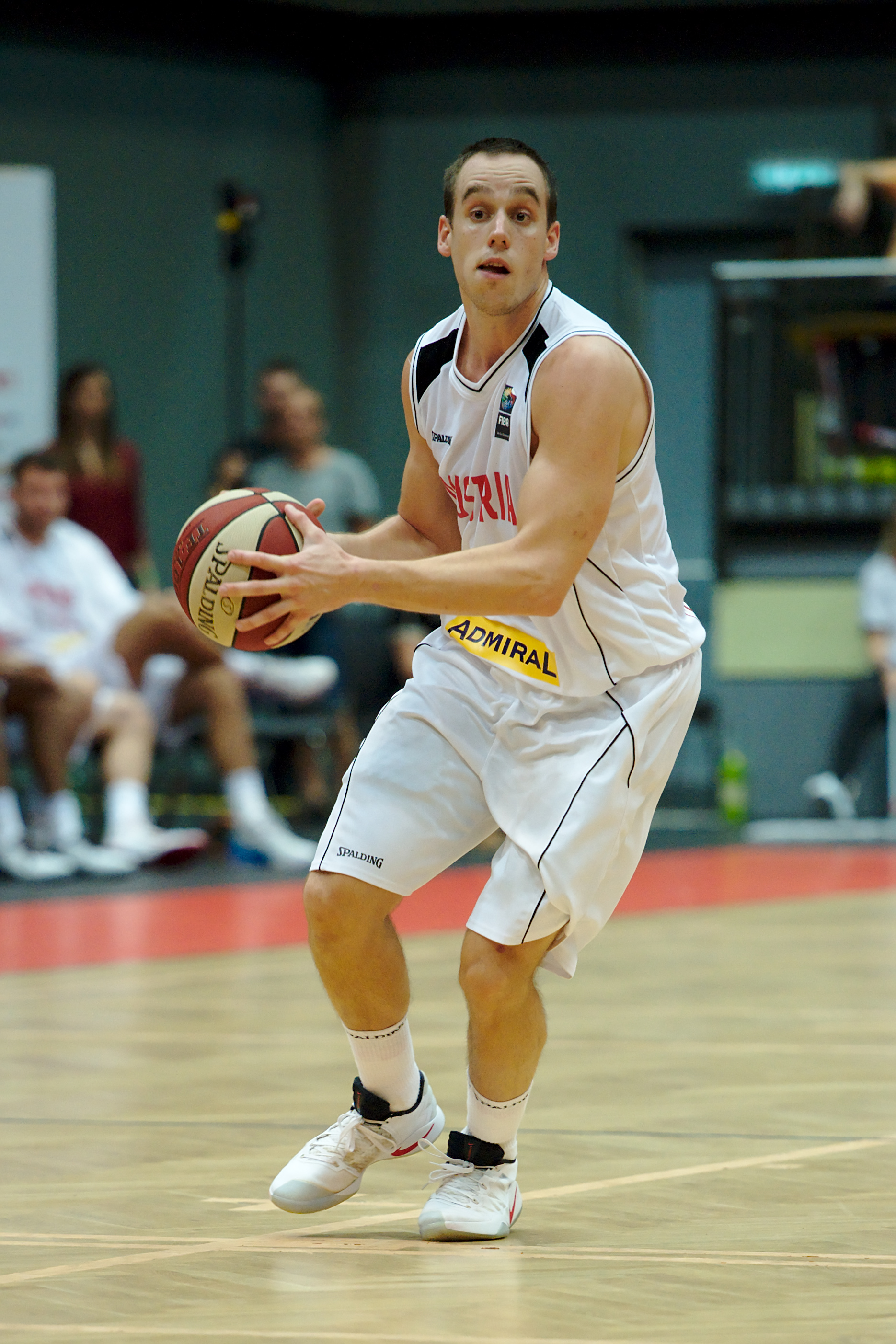

No. 8 – UBSC Graz
- Position: Shooting guard
- League: Austrian Basketball Superliga

Personal information
- Born: 8 August 1991 (age 35)
- Listed height: 6 ft 4 in (1.93 m)

Career information
- Playing career: 2007–present

Career history
- 2013–2015: Autocid Ford Burgos
- 2015–2016: Miraflores
- 2016–present: UBSC Graz

Anton Maresch (born 8 August 1991) is an Austrian professional basketball player. He currently plays for UBSC Graz of the Austrian Basketball Superliga.

He represented Austria‘s national basketball team at the EuroBasket 2017 qualification.
