= Josep Franch (basketball) =

Spanish basketball player

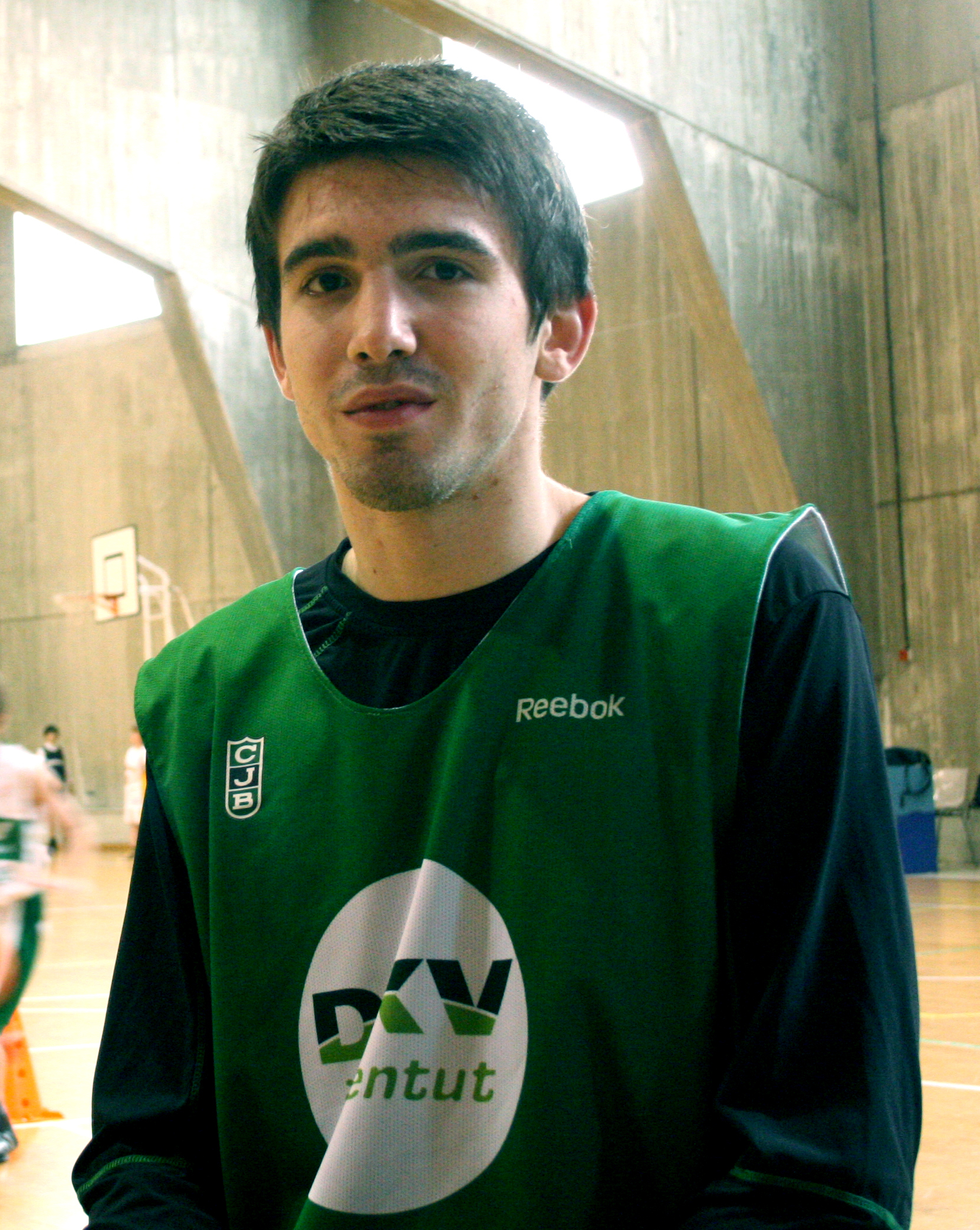

Free Agent
- Position: Point guard

Personal information
- Born: 28 January 1991 (age 35) Badalona, Spain
- Listed height: 6 ft 3 in (1.91 m)
- Listed weight: 194 lb (88 kg)

Career information
- NBA draft: 2012: undrafted
- Playing career: 2007–present

Career history
- 2007–2011: Joventut Badalona
- 2011–2013: Murcia
- 2013–2014: Sevilla
- 2014–2015: Gipuzkoa Basket
- 2015–2016: Melilla
- 2016–2017: Breogán
- 2017–2018: Sevilla
- 2018–2021: Melilla
- 2021–2023: Girona
- 2023–present: Estudiantes
Medals
Men's basketball
Representing Spain
FIBA Europe U20 Championship
Bronze medal – third place	2010 Zadar	Team competition
Gold medal – first place	2011 Bilbao	Team competition
FIBA Europe U16 Championship
Silver medal – second place	2007 Rethymno	Team competition

Josep Franch de Pablo (born 28 January 1991) is a Spanish professional basketball player who last played for Estudiantes of the LEB Oro

== Awards and accomplishments ==
=== Spain national team ===
- FIBA Europe Under-16 Championship: Silver Medal (2007)
- FIBA Europe Under-20 Championship: Bronze Medal (2010)
- FIBA Europe Under-20 Championship: Gold Medal (2011)
