= Brandon Walton =

American football player (born 1998)

Profile
- Position: Offensive tackle

Personal information
- Born: March 18, 1998 (age 28); Clearwater, Florida, U.S.
- Listed height: 6 ft 5 in (1.96 m)
- Listed weight: 300 lb (136 kg)

Career information
- High school: Seminole (Seminole, Florida)
- College: Florida Atlantic (2016–2019)
- NFL draft: 2020: undrafted

Career history
- Buffalo Bills (2020)*; Pittsburgh Steelers (2020)*; Tampa Bay Buccaneers (2021–2023); Carolina Panthers (2024–2025); Atlanta Falcons (2026)*
- * Offseason or practice squad member only

Career NFL statistics as of 2024
- Games played: 16
- Games started: 2
- Stats at Pro Football Reference

Brandon Walton (born March 18, 1998) is an American professional football offensive tackle. He played college football for the Florida Atlantic Owls and was signed by the Buffalo Bills as an undrafted free agent in 2020.

== Early life ==
Walton was born on March 18, 1998, in Clearwater, Florida. He attended Seminole High School, where he was named PCAC Lineman of the Year in both 2014 and 2015. He was named All-Tampa Bay and was a three-star recruit, receiving offers from more than 20 universities. He committed to Florida Atlantic University on December 5, 2015. As a freshman in 2016, he appeared in two games, against Kansas State and Old Dominion.

As a sophomore in 2017, Walton played as one of Florida Atlantic's starting offensive linemen, helping them achieve an undefeated Conference USA (C-USA) record. In spring 2018, he was named co-MVP of the team's offensive line. He was a preseason third-team all-conference selection and was a starting lineman, earning Phil Steele third-team All-C-USA honors at the end of the year.

As a senior, Walton earned first-team All-C-USA honors at left tackle. He was named the winner of the Spring Offensive Lineman "Top Guy" Award at the beginning of the season and was a second-team preseason all-conference selection by Athlon Sports, first-team by the Phil Steele magazine. He helped the team win the C-USA championship and started in every game. Phil Steele named him first-team all-conference at the end of the year.

== Professional career ==
Pre-draft measurables
Height	Weight	Arm length	Hand span	Wingspan
6 ft 4 1/4 in (1.94 m)	311 lb (141 kg)	34 1/8 in (0.87 m)	9 in (0.23 m)	6 ft 9 1/8 in (2.06 m)
All values from Pro Day

=== Buffalo Bills ===
After going unselected in the 2020 NFL draft, Walton was signed by the Buffalo Bills as an undrafted free agent. He was released on September 5, at the final roster cuts. The following day, he was signed to the team's practice squad. He was released from the practice squad on September 8.

=== Pittsburgh Steelers ===
On September 19, Walton was signed to the practice squad of the Pittsburgh Steelers. He was signed to a futures contract on January 14, 2021. He was waived by the team on August 17, during the first round of roster cuts.

=== Tampa Bay Buccaneers ===
On August 18, one day after being waived from Pittsburgh, Walton was claimed by the Tampa Bay Buccaneers. He was waived on August 31, at the final roster cuts, but was re-signed to the practice squad the following day. Walton was released from the practice squad on January 31, 2022. On February 16, he was signed as a free agent by Tampa Bay. Walton made the Buccaneers' final roster in 2022. He made his NFL debut in week one of the regular season, appearing on four special teams snaps in a 19–3 win over the Dallas Cowboys. He appeared in a total of 11 games in the 2022 season, starting two. The Buccaneers waived Walton during final roster cuts on August 28, 2024.

=== Carolina Panthers ===
Walton was signed to the Carolina Panthers practice squad on August 30, 2024. He signed a reserve/future contract with Carolina on January 6, 2025.

Walton was waived on August 26, 2025 and re-signed to the practice squad.

=== Atlanta Falcons ===
Walton was signed by the Atlanta Falcons on May 11, 2026 after a tryout during rookie minicamp. He was released by the Falcons on August 29.
