= Eduardo Hernández-Sonseca =

Spanish basketball player

Eduardo Hernández-Sonseca Lorenzo
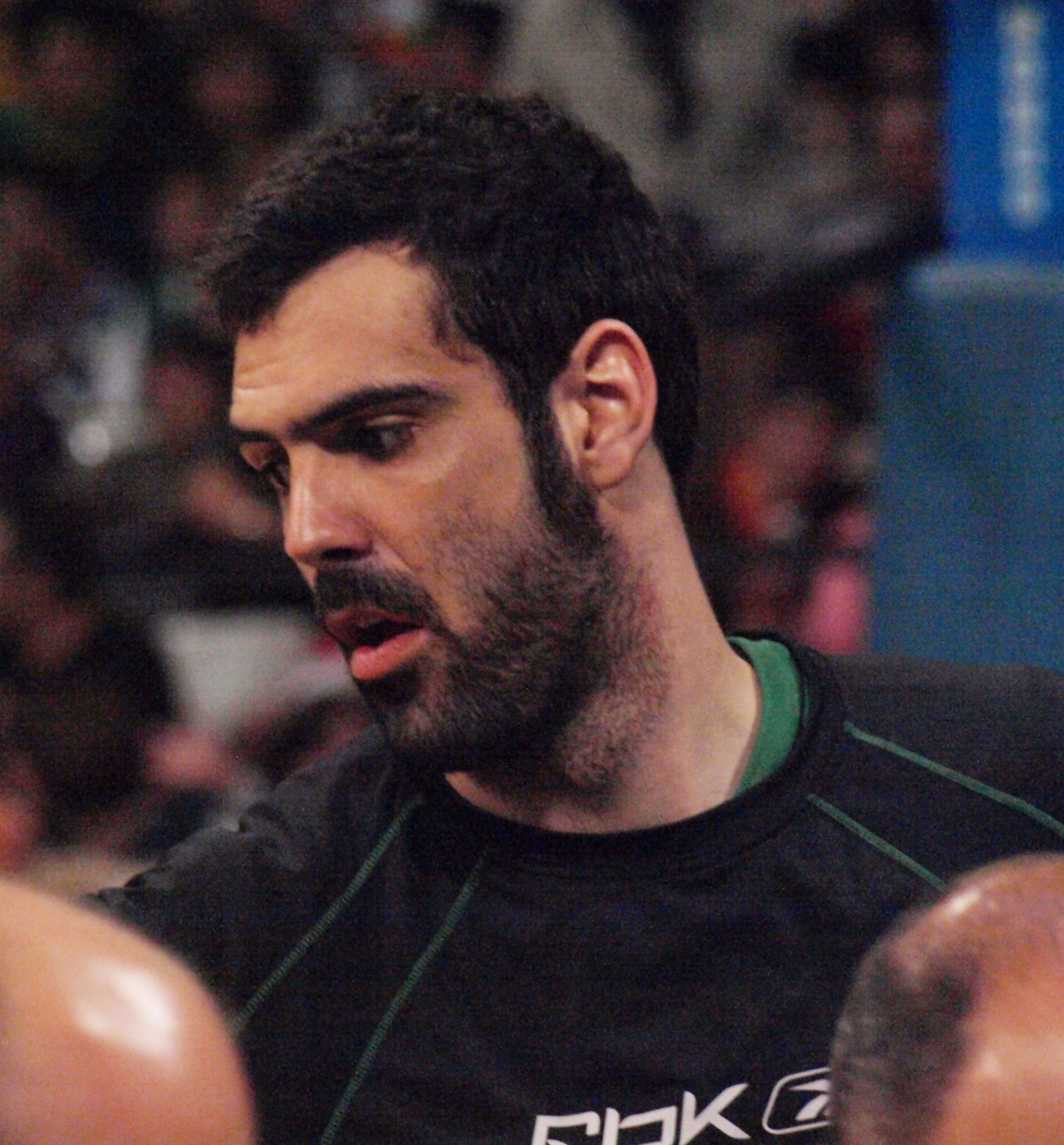

Personal information
- Born: 21 June 1983 (age 43) Madrid, Spain
- Listed height: 6 ft 11.5 in (2.12 m)
- Listed weight: 245 lb (111 kg)

Career information
- Playing career: 2000–present
- Position: Center

Career history
- 2000–2007: Real Madrid
- 2000–2002: →Real Madrid B
- 2004–2005: →Gran Canaria
- 2007–2010: Joventut Badalona
- 2010–2011: Bilbao Basket
- 2011–2012: Valladolid
- 2012: Caja Laboral
- 2013: Coruña
- 2013–2014: Afra Khalij Fars Tehran
- 2014: Kangoeroes Basket Willebroek
- 2014: Navarra
- 2014–2015: Bucaneros de La Guaira
- 2015–2016: Club Melilla Baloncesto
- 2016–2017: Oviedo
- 2017–2018: Coruña
- 2018–2020: Navarra

Career highlights
- All-LEB Oro Team (2016)

Eduardo Hernández-Sonseca Lorenzo (born 21 June 1983) is a Spanish former professional basketball player who last played for Basket Navarra of the LEB Plata.

== Professional career ==
Hernández-Sonseca starts his career in the reserve team of Baloncesto, and he played with the whites until 2007, when he leaves the club for playing with DKV Joventut. After spending three seasons in Badalona, he continued playing at several clubs of the Liga ACB. On 25 September 2012 he signed a two-week deal with Caja Laboral after playing the entire pre-season with the team. He started the 2013–14 season with Afra Fars, a team in the Iranian Basketball Super League. On 26 January 2014 he signed with the Belgian team Kangoeroes Basket Willebroek.

== Spain national team ==
Hernández-Sonseca played for the first time with the Spain national basketball team on 23 November 2003, in a game of the Qualification for the EuroBasket 2003 against Denmark, where Spain won by 87–43 at Arganda del Rey. Sonseca made 17 points and grabbed 9 rebounds, in the best performance for a newcomer in the Spanish squad.

Sonseca joined also the national team before the 2006 FIBA World Championship, but finally coach Hernández chose Marc Gasol instead of him for playing the tournament.

== Trophies ==
Real Madrid

- Liga ACB: 2004–05
- ULEB Cup (2006–07

Joventut

- ULEB Cup: 2007–08
- Copa del Rey: 2008

Oviedo

- Copa Princesa de Asturias: 2017
