= Carles Marco (basketball) =

Spanish basketball player and coach

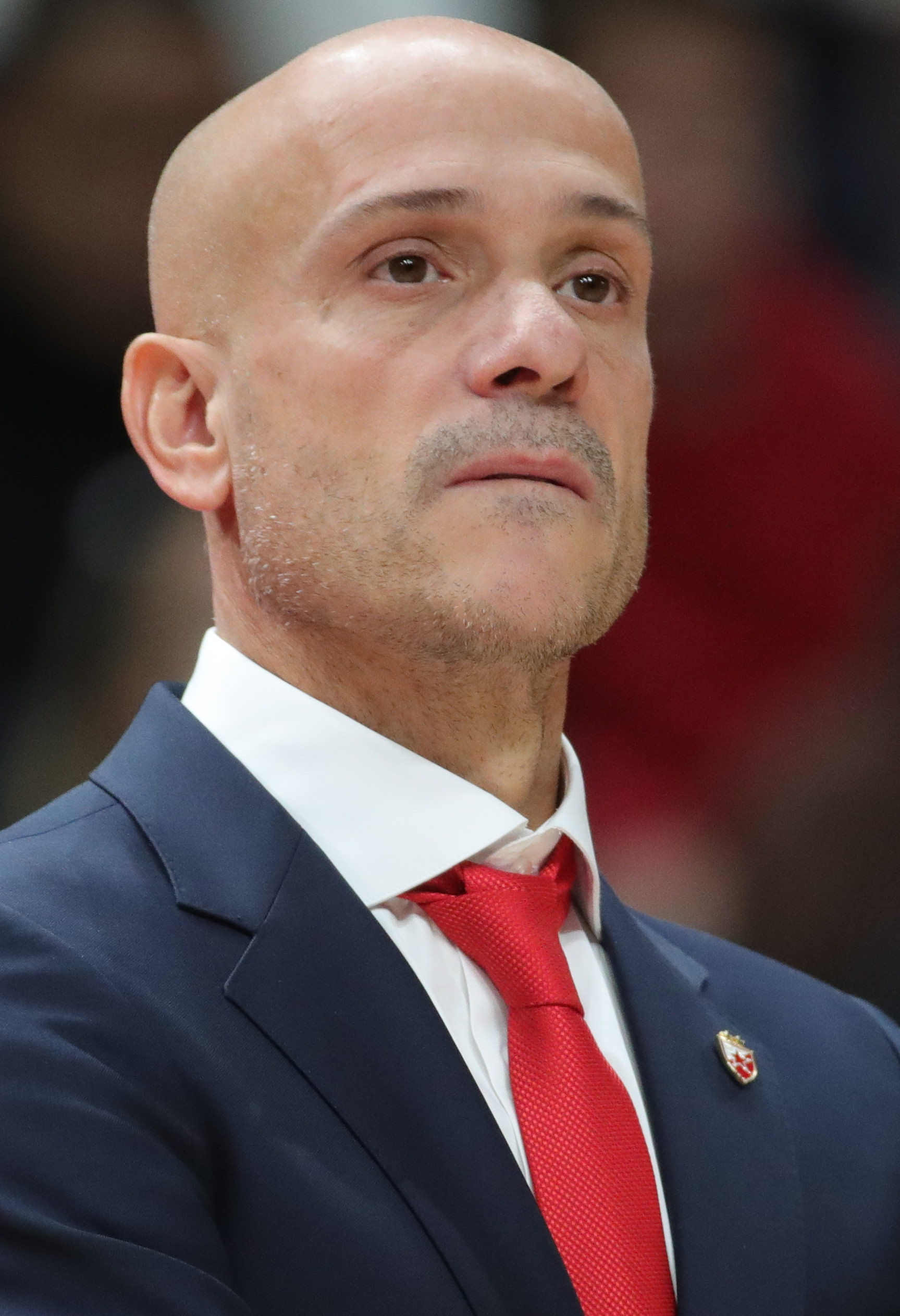
- Marco with Crvena zvezda in 2022

Básquet Coruña
- Title: Head coach
- League: Primera FEB

Personal information
- Born: 23 September 1974 (age 52) Badalona, Spain
- Listed height: 1.80 m (5 ft 11 in)
- Listed weight: 78 kg (172 lb)

Career information
- NBA draft: 1996: undrafted
- Playing career: 1994–2009
- Position: Point guard

Career history

Playing
- 1994–1996: Sant Josep Badalona
- 1996–1998: Gijón Baloncesto
- 1998–2002: Valladolid
- 2002–2005: Joventut Badalona
- 2005–2007: Caja San Fernando
- 2007–2008: Baloncesto León
- 2008: Manresa
- 2008: CAI Zaragoza
- 2009: Ford Burgos

Coaching
- 2011–2015: Manresa (assistant)
- 2015–2018: Oviedo
- 2019–2020: Palencia
- 2020–2021: Girona
- 2022–2023: Crvena zvezda (assistant)
- 2023–2024: Barcelona (assistant)
- 2024–2025: Paris (assistant)
- 2025–present: Básquet Coruña

Career highlights
- As Assistant Coach: Serbian League champion (2023); Serbian Cup winner (2023)
Medals
Men's basketball
Representing Spain
FIBA EuroBasket
Silver medal – second place	2003 Sweden
Mediterranean Games
Gold medal – first place	2001 Tunis
Universiade
Bronze medal – third place	1999 Palma

Carles Marco Viñas (born September 23, 1974) is a Spanish retired basketball player, who played as point guard, and the current head coach for Básquet Coruña the Primera FEB.

== Professional career ==
Marco spent all his career in the two top divisions of the Spanish basketball, making his debut at Liga ACB in 1998 with Fórum Valladolid. He was selected to play the Liga ACB All Star Game in the 2000–01 and the 2002–03 seasons. He retired in 2009, after playing the second half of the 2008–09 LEB Oro season with Ford Burgos.

== National team career ==
In August and September 2002, Marco was a member of the Spain national team that finished 5th at the FIBA World Championship in Indianapolis, U.S. Over eight tournament games, he averaged 4.9 points, 0.9 rebounds, and 1.9 assists per game. In September 2003, Marco was a member of the Spanish roster that won a silver medal at the FIBA European Championship in Sweden. Over six tournament games, he averaged 6.7 points, 1.5 rebounds, and 2.5 assists per game. In total, Marco played 34 matches for the national team.

== Coaching career ==
Marco started his career as coach in 2011, as the assistant coach of Bàsquet Manresa of Liga ACB. Four seasons later, he signed with Unión Financiera Baloncesto Oviedo of the LEB Oro for his first experience as head coach. In May 2018, Oviedo and Carles Marco parted ways after three seasons qualifying for the promotion playoffs.

On 20 November 2022, Marco was appointed as an assistant coach for Crvena zvezda under Duško Ivanović.

On June 23, 2025, he was appointed head coach for Básquet Coruña of the Primera FEB, the second tier of Spanish Basketball.

=== National teams ===
In July 2016, Marco was an assistant coach for the Spain national under-20 team that won a gold medal at the European Championship in Helsinki, Finland.

== Career achievements ==
As head coach:

- Copa Princesa de Asturias winner: 1 (with Oviedo: 2017)

== Personal life ==
His father, Lluís Marco, is a Spanish actor.
