= Beka Burjanadze =

Georgian basketball player

Beka Burjanadze ბექა ბურჯანაძე
Personal information
- Born: January 3, 1994 (age 32) Tbilisi, Georgia
- Listed height: 6 ft 7 in (2.01 m)
- Listed weight: 225 lb (102 kg)

Career information
- NBA draft: 2016: undrafted
- Playing career: 2011–present
- Position: Power forward

Career history
- 2011–2014: Cajasol Sevilla
- 2014–2016: Leyma Básquet Coruña
- 2016–2018: MoraBanc Andorra
- 2018–2019: Gipuzkoa Basket
- 2019–2021: Herbalife Gran Canaria
- 2021–2022: Real Betis Baloncesto
- 2022–2023: Pallacanestro Reggiana
- 2023–2025: Básquet Coruña
- 2025–2026: Coviran Granada

Beka Burjanadze (Georgian: ბექა ბურჯანაძე) (born January 3, 1994) is a Georgian professional basketball player who is currently a free agent.

== Early career ==
He played some years in Cajasol Sevilla's junior teams, Beka made his full debut for the first team, on January 16, 2011, against Bizkaia Bilbao Basket.

== Professional career ==
In September 2014 he rescinded his contract to sign with LEB Oro team Básquet Coruña.

On August 17, 2018, he parted ways with MoraBanc Andorra of the Liga ACB to sign a one-year deal with Delteco GBC of the Liga ACB.

On June 17, 2019, he has signed with Herbalife Gran Canaria of the Liga ACB.

On July 29, 2021, he has signed with Real Betis Baloncesto of the Liga ACB.

On November 14, 2022, he signed with Pallacanestro Reggiana of the Lega Basket Serie A.

In August 2023, he rejoined Básquet Coruña of the LEB Oro.

On July 31, 2025, he signed with Coviran Granada of the Liga ACB.

== National team career ==
Beka Burjanadze is a regular player for the Georgia national basketball teams. He played his first international game against Israel the 3 December 2016.

== Personal life ==
His cousin is Georgian international Zaza Pachulia who was two time NBA champion with the Golden State Warriors.
