= Polideportivo El Plantío =

Indoor sporting arena located in Spain

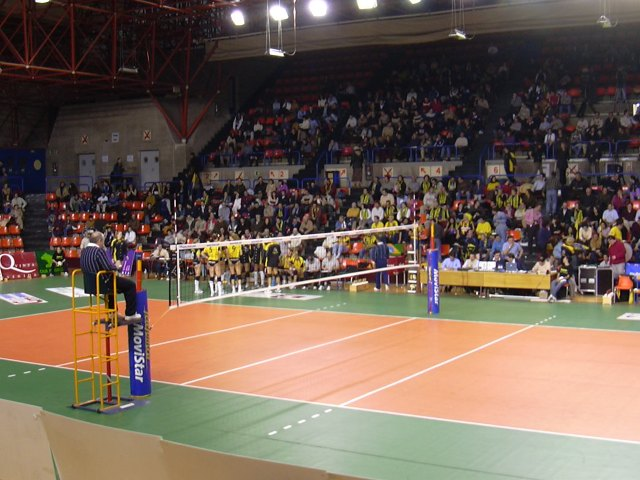
- Full name: Polideportivo El Plantío
- Location: c/ Cascajera, s/n
- Owner: Burgos City Hall
- Capacity: 2,432
- Surface: Parquet Floor
- Record attendance: 3,500
- Field size: 45m x 25m

Construction
- Opened: 1979
- Renovated: 2002

Tenants
- CB Atapuerca (2000–2013); CB Ciudad de Burgos (1996–2014); CV Diego Porcelos; Basket Burgos 2002 (2010–2018); CB Tizona (2013–2015, 2016–present); CB Miraflores (2015–2017)

Polideportivo El Plantío is a multi-purpose sports arena in Burgos, Castile and León, Spain. It has a capacity of 2,432 seats but for CB Miraflores games it's expanded to 3,150 by adding chairs in all the corridors.

It is owned by the Burgos City Hall. The arena serves as the home of the main local sports teams.

El Plantío has also rooms for practicing fencing, boxing and table tennis. The most important event at El Plantío was the U23 World Basketball Championship in July 1993.
