= Ferrán Bassas =

Spanish basketball player

No. 6 – Bàsquet Manresa
- Position: Point guard
- League: Liga ACB; EuroCup

Personal information
- Born: 29 April 1992 (age 34) Barcelona, Spain
- Listed height: 1.81 m (5 ft 11 in)

Career information
- NBA draft: 2014: undrafted
- Playing career: 2010–present

Career history
- 2010–2013: Prat
- 2013–2016: Oviedo
- 2016–2019: Canarias
- 2019–2020: Burgos
- 2020–2022: Joventut Badalona
- 2022–2024: Gran Canaria
- 2024–2025: Andorra
- 2025–present: Manresa

Ferran Bassas Navarra (born 29 April 1992) is a Spanish professional basketball player for Bàsquet Manresa of the Spanish Liga ACB and the EuroCup.

== Professional career ==
On 30 April 2017, Bassas won the Basketball Champions League with Tenerife. He spent the 2019–20 season with Burgos. On 2 July 2020, Bassas signed with Joventut Badalona.

On July 5, 2022, Bassas signed with Gran Canaria of the Liga ACB and EuroCup.

On July 4, 2024, Bassas was announced as a new BC Andorra player, signing a 2 year contract with the Andorra-based team.

On December 14, 2025, he was announced as a new Bàsquet Manresa player, signing with the Catalans until the end of the 2025–26 season.
