= Básquet Coruña =

Leyma Coruña
- League: Liga ACB
- Founded: June 1996; 30 years ago
- Arena: Coliseum da Coruña
- Capacity: 9,300
- Location: A Coruña, Spain
- Team colors: Orange and blue
- President: Roberto Cibeira
- Head coach: Carles Marco
- Championships: 1 LEB Oro; 1 Copa Galicia
- Website: basquetcoruna.com
Home	Away

Club Básquet Coruña, SAD, also known as Leyma Coruña for sponsorship reasons, is a professional basketball club based in A Coruña, Spain. The team plays in the Liga ACB, after being promoted in the 2025–26 Primera FEB season. Their home arena is the Coliseum da Coruña.

== History ==
Original Básquet Coruña logo, used until 2018.

CB Coruña was founded in 1996 as a merger of clubs CB Ventorrillo and CB Arteixo. This club would substitute former Baloncesto Coruña CAB, that played its last season in Liga EBA before being dissolved.

After playing some seasons at Liga EBA, the club joined LEB league, where it remained four years, known as Sondeos del Norte due to sponsorship reasons. In 2002, CB Coruña sold its LEB spot to a new club Basket Zaragoza. After that, the club could continue playing in Liga EBA, thanks to the promotion of its reserve team.

In 2004, Básquet Coruña did not participate in any competition due to financial reasons, but the club comes back in 2005 to Liga EBA. In 2007, the club was invited to the newly created fourth tier LEB Bronce as one of the participants of the Final Stage of the 2006–07 Liga EBA. In their debut season, the club clinched the promotion to LEB Plata where it finished in the relegation positions in their first season. However, the club was repechaged due to the existence of vacant berths.

Básquet Coruña consolidated in LEB Plata until 2012, when it achieved a vacant berth in LEB Oro, coming back to the Spanish second division ten years later.

Coruña won the LEB Oro championship in the 2023–24 season, being promoted to the Liga ACB for the first time in club history. They defeated Melilla on the final game day to earn direct promotion.

== Players ==
=== Current roster ===
Leyma Coruña roster
Players
Coaches

Pos.	No.	Nat.	Name	Ht.	Age
PG	0	(Spain)	Cuevas, Dídac	1.78 m (5 ft 10 in)	26 – 20 June 2000
PG	1	(United States)	Verge Jr., Alonzo	1.91 m (6 ft 3 in)	27 – 17 October 1998
SF	2	(Spain)	del Castillo, Eric	1.98 m (6 ft 6 in)	19 – 31 May 2007
SG	4	(United States)	Jorgensen, Paul	1.88 m (6 ft 2 in)	30 – 21 July 1996
SF	5	(Spain)	Jou, Guillem (C)	1.95 m (6 ft 5 in)	29 – 15 July 1997
PF	7	(Mali) (Spain)	Camara, Ouwa	2.03 m (6 ft 8 in)	18 – 1 March 2008
PF	8	(Montenegro)	Radončić, Dino	2.02 m (6 ft 8 in)	27 – 8 January 1999
PG	9	(Brazil)	Pacheco, Caio	1.90 m (6 ft 3 in)	27 – 22 February 1999
SF	10	(Lithuania)	Uleckas, Lukas	1.99 m (6 ft 6 in)	27 – 6 August 1999
C	24	(Puerto Rico)	Conditt IV, George	2.11 m (6 ft 11 in)	26 – 22 August 2000
C	25	(Latvia)	Šiliņš, Kārlis	2.11 m (6 ft 11 in)	29 – 22 July 1997
SG	33	(Lithuania)	Dimša, Tomas	1.96 m (6 ft 5 in)	32 – 2 January 1994
C	44	(Ukraine)	Skapintsev, Dmytro	2.16 m (7 ft 1 in)	28 – 12 May 1998
PF	50	(Spain)	Díaz, Jacobo	2.06 m (6 ft 9 in)	30 – 23 July 1996

Head coach

- (Spanish Basketball Federation) Carles Marco

Assistant coach(es)

- (Spanish Basketball Federation) Román Gómez
- (Spanish Basketball Federation) Carlos Penedo

Legend

- (C) Team captain
- Injured

- Roster
- Transactions
Updated: September 12, 2026

=== Depth chart ===
Pos.	Starting 5	Bench 1	Bench 2
C	George Conditt IV *	Dmytro Skapintsev	Kārlis Šiliņš
PF	Dino Radončić †	Jacobo Díaz †	Ouwa Camara †
SF	Lukas Uleckas	Guillem Jou †	Eric del Castillo †
SG	Tomas Dimša	Paul Jorgensen
PG	Alonzo Verge Jr. *	Dídac Cuevas †	Caio Pacheco

Notes: Blue † – homegrown player; (Note: A homegrown player is a player that played for at least three years before the age of 20 on a Spanish team. In Liga ACB, the team must register at least four homegrown players in rosters of 10–12 players or at least three homegrown players in rosters of 8–9 players.) Red * – overseas player; (Note: An overseas player is a player from outside EEA, FIBA Europe or ACP states. In Liga ACB, the team may register at most two overseas players.) Green ‡ – youth player (Note: In Liga ACB, the team may register under-22 players linked to the youth system.)

== Season by season ==
Season	Tier	Division	Pos.	W–L	Cup competitions	
1996–97	3	Liga EBA	1st		Copa EBA	RU
1997–98	3	Liga EBA	1st (Note: Achieved a vacant berth in LEB.)	23–3	Copa EBA	SF
1998–99	2	LEB	13th	10–20		
1999–00	2	LEB	13th	12–18		
2000–01	2	LEB	14th	13–20		
2001–02	2	LEB	14th (Note: Sold the berth in LEB to CAI Zaragoza.)	12–22		
2002–03	4	Liga EBA	4th	22–8		
2003–04	4	Liga EBA	3rd	27–8		
2004–05	Did not enter any competition					
2005–06	4	Liga EBA	8th	15–15		
2006–07	4	Liga EBA	2nd	21–9		
2007–08	4	LEB Bronce	3rd	21–15		
2008–09	3	LEB Plata	15th (Note: Remained in the league by achieving a vacant berth after the dissolution of the LEB Bronce league.)	9–21		
2009–10	3	LEB Plata	10th	17–15		
2010–11	3	LEB Plata	11th	9–19		
2011–12	3	LEB Plata	7th (Note: Achieved a vacant berth in LEB Oro.)	13–13		
2012–13	2	LEB Oro	9th	13–18		
2013–14	2	LEB Oro	6th	14–14		
2014–15	2	LEB Oro	10th	12–16		
2015–16	2	LEB Oro	5th	22–18		
2016–17	2	LEB Oro	6th	22–17		
2017–18	2	LEB Oro	8th	18–21		
2018–19	2	LEB Oro	12th	14–20		
2019–20	2	LEB Oro	3rd (Note: Season curtailed due to the COVID-19 pandemic.)	16–8		
2020–21	2	LEB Oro	3rd	21–10		
2021–22	2	LEB Oro	7th	19–18		
2022–23	2	LEB Oro	6th	24–12		
2023–24	2	LEB Oro	1st	27–7	Copa Princesa	RU
2024–25	1	Liga ACB	18th	7–27		
2025–26	2	Primera FEB	2nd	33–5	Spain Cup	R16

== Trophies and awards ==
=== Trophies ===
- LEB Oro: (1)
  - 2024
- Copa Galicia: (1)
  - 1996

=== Individual awards ===
LEB Plata MVP

- Robert Joseph – 2009
