= Club Melilla Baloncesto =

Spanish basketball team

Melilla Baloncesto
- Leagues: LEB Oro
- Founded: 1991; 35 years ago
- History: Club Melilla Baloncesto (1991–present)
- Arena: Javier Imbroda Ortiz
- Capacity: 3,800
- Location: Melilla, Spain
- Team colors: Navy, Blue, White
- President: Jaime Auday
- Vice-president: Mustafa Mohand
- Head coach: Alejandro Alcoba
- Championships: 3 Copa Príncipe
- Website: clubmelillabaloncesto.es
Home	Away

Club Melilla Baloncesto is a professional basketball team based in Melilla that plays in the LEB league. This is the only team in Spain that played all LEB seasons.

The team's home arena is the Pabellón Javier Imbroda Ortiz (formerly known as Ciudad de Melilla), with a capacity of up to 3,800 spectators.

== History ==
Club Melilla Baloncesto was founded in 1991 as a merge of Baloncesto Melilla and CB Gran Tercio. In its first season, played in the second division with the name of Unicaja Melilla as an affiliated team of Liga ACB club Unicaja. Despite being relegated, remained in the league after its expansion to 31 teams, that allowed the club to continue playing in the second division, indeed when the Liga EBA was created.

In 1996, Melilla became one of the founding clubs of the Liga LEB. In 1999, the club achieved their first title by winning the Copa Príncipe de Asturias after defeating Menorca Bàsquet in the final, and is close to promote to the Liga ACB, but was eliminated in the last round of the playoffs by Breogán Universidade.

In 2001, Melilla clinched their segund Copa Príncipe de Asturias, this time beating Bàsquet Manresa in the Final Four played at home. After several years of consolidation in the league, in 2008 the club reached again the last round of the promotion playoffs but lost to Lucentum Alicante in the last round. One year later, despite winning their third Cup and despite being the top seeded team, was eliminated in the semifinals of the promotion playoffs to Ford Burgos.

In 2013 the club suffered their first relegation ever from the LEB Oro, but remained in the league after achieving a vacant place. Three years later, in 2016, the club clinched the promotion to Liga ACB, but resigned to join the league resigned to promote due to the impossibility to fulfill the requirements.

== Players ==
=== Current roster ===
Note: Flags indicate national team eligibility at FIBA-sanctioned events. Players may hold other non-FIBA nationalities not displayed.

Club Melilla Baloncesto roster
Players
Coaches

Pos.	No.	Nat.	Name	Ht.	Age
PF	0	(Spain)	Godspower, Jeffrey	2.00 m (6 ft 7 in)	24 – 12 June 2002
PF	3	(United States)	McMullen, Nick	2.02 m (6 ft 8 in)	24 – 13 July 2002
PG	4	(Denmark)	Ceccardi, Sebastian Åris	1.88 m (6 ft 2 in)	30 – 9 December 1995
SG	7	(Spain)	Córdoba, Pablo	1.88 m (6 ft 2 in)	29 – 24 October 1997
G	10	(United States)	Hoover, Nathan	1.93 m (6 ft 4 in)	29 – 24 May 1997
SF	12	(Ukraine)	Krutous, Pavlo	1.94 m (6 ft 4 in)	34 – 9 April 1992
SF	13	(Spain)	Rodríguez, Sergio	2.03 m (6 ft 8 in)	33 – 18 October 1993
C	21	(France)	Debaut, Ludgy	2.13 m (7 ft 0 in)	28 – 8 August 1998
PG	22	(Spain)	Díaz, Christian	1.84 m (6 ft 0 in)	34 – 23 March 1992
G/F	24	(Colombia) (Spain)	Caicedo, Michael	1.98 m (6 ft 6 in)	23 – 21 June 2003
C	33	(Netherlands) (Spain)	Stilma, Morgan	2.03 m (6 ft 8 in)	26 – 19 June 2000
PG	44	(Spain)	García, Javier	1.81 m (5 ft 11 in)	25 – 6 April 2001
C	50	(Denmark) (Ivory Coast)	Zohore, Jonas	2.10 m (6 ft 11 in)	35 – 6 July 1991

Head coach

- (Spain) Rafa Sanz

Legend

- (C) Team captain
- Injured

=== Depth chart ===
Pos.	Starting 5	Bench 1	Bench 2
C	Ludgy Debaut	Jonas Zohore
PF	Jeffrey Godspower	Morgan Stilma
SF	Sergio Rodríguez	Pavlo Krutous	Michael Caicedo
SG	Pablo Córdoba	Nathan Hoover
PG	Javier García	Sebastian Åris Ceccardi	Christian Díaz

Colours: Blue = homegrown player; Red = non–FIBA Europe player

== Season by season ==
Season	Tier	Division	Pos.	W–L	Cup competitions	
1991–92	2	1ª División	14th (Note: Remained in the league as a result of an expansion.)	11–29		
1992–93	2	1ª División	25th	17–19		
1993–94	2	1ª División	23rd	17–13		
1994–95	2	Liga EBA	6th	15–11		
1995–96	2	Liga EBA	4th			
1996–97	2	LEB	7th	20–13		
1997–98	2	LEB	10th	11–17	Copa Príncipe	QF
1998–99	2	LEB	3rd	22–12	Copa Príncipe	C
1999–00	2	LEB	5th	20–13	Copa Príncipe	SF
2000–01	2	LEB	12th	11–19	Copa Príncipe	C
2001–02	2	LEB	7th	17–18		
2002–03	2	LEB	11th	13–17		
2003–04	2	LEB	10th	16–18		
2004–05	2	LEB	12th	14–20		
2005–06	2	LEB	15th	14–20		
2006–07	2	LEB	13th	15–19	Copa Príncipe	SF
2007–08	2	LEB	10th	15–19		
2008–09	2	LEB Oro	3rd	26–12	Copa Príncipe	RU
2009–10	2	LEB Oro	4th	29–14	Copa Príncipe	C
2010–11	2	LEB Oro	11th	14–20		
2011–12	2	LEB Oro	3rd	27–21		
2012–13	2	LEB Oro	14th (Note: Remained in LEB Oro due to vacant berths.)	6–20		
2013–14	2	LEB Oro	11th	10–16		
2014–15	2	LEB Oro	9th	13–17		
2015–16	2	LEB Oro	2nd (Note: Did not promote as the club did not fulfill the requirements to play in Liga ACB.)	31–10	Copa Princesa	RU
2016–17	2	LEB Oro	7th	19–18		
2017–18	2	LEB Oro	3rd	29–19		
2018–19	2	LEB Oro	4th	24–16		
2019–20	2	LEB Oro	6th (Note: Season curtailed due to the COVID-19 pandemic.)	15–9		
2020–21	2	LEB Oro	15th	11-15		
2021–22	2	LEB Oro	13th	14–20		
2022–23	2	LEB Oro	16th (Note: Remained in LEB Oro due to vacant berths.)	8–26		
2023–24	2	LEB Oro	16th	10–24		
2024–25	3	Segunda FEB	2nd (Note: Achieved promotion to Primera FEB.)	15–11	Spain Cup	GS
2025–26	2	Primera FEB	17th	7–25	Spain Cup	R16
2026–27	3	Segunda FEB			Spain Cup	R16

== Trophies and awards ==
=== Trophies ===
- Copa Príncipe de Asturias: (3)
  - 1999, 2001, 2010

=== Individual awards ===
All-LEB Oro Team

- Eduardo Hernández-Sonseca – 2016
