= 2017 LEB Oro playoffs =

The 2017 LEB Oro playoffs is the final stage of the 2016–17 LEB Oro season. They will start on 5 May 2017 and will finish on 13 June if necessary.

All series will be played in a best-of-5 games format. The best seeded team plays at home the games 1, 2 and 5 if necessary. The winner of the finals will promote to the 2017–18 ACB season with RETAbet.es GBC, the champion of the regular season.

== Bracket ==
Quarter-finals
C Unión Financiera Oviedo	85	78	73	74
9 Ourense Provincia Termal	92	60	39	66
5 Quesos Cerrato Palencia	84	92	94	106	83
6 Leyma Coruña	88	80	104	101	77
2 Cafés Candelas Breogán	77	94	58	100	73
8 Palma Air Europa	65	99	64	90	71
3 San Pablo Burgos	79	82	91
7 Club Melilla Baloncesto	78	76	76

Semi-finals
C Unión Financiera Oviedo	74	74	70	71
5 Quesos Cerrato Palencia	76	68	81	86
2 Cafés Candelas Breogán	80	79	81
3 San Pablo Burgos	93	88	92

Final
5 Quesos Cerrato Palencia	79	82	85
3 San Pablo Burgos	80	90	86

== Quarterfinals ==
=== Unión Financiera Baloncesto Oviedo v Ourense Provincia Termal ===
5 May 2017	Unión Financiera Baloncesto Oviedo	85–92 (Series: 0–1)	Ourense Provincia Termal	Oviedo
21:00	Scoring by quarter: 18–24, 18–25, 17–24, 32–19
	Pts: Rodríguez 14; Rebs: Hernández-Sonseca 3 Asts: Pérez 7 PIR: Pérez 19	Boxscore	Pts: Díaz 21; Rebs: Guerra 14; Asts: Díaz 8 PIR: Mitrović 28	Arena: Pumarín; Referees: Morales Ruiz, Quintas Álvarez

7 May 2017	Unión Financiera Baloncesto Oviedo	78–60 (Series: 1–1)	Ourense Provincia Termal	Oviedo
18:00	Scoring by quarter: 19–24, 18–5, 18–11, 23–20
	Pts: Salvó 20; Rebs: Barro 10; Asts: Pérez 4 PIR: Salvó 24	Boxscore	Pts: Guerra 15; Rebs: Jurić 8 Asts: Díaz 4 PIR: Guerra, Wright 10	Arena: Pumarín; Attendance: 1,238; Referees: Zafra Guerra, Gómez López

12 May 2017	Ourense Provincia Termal	39–73 (Series: 1–2)	Unión Financiera Baloncesto Oviedo	Ourense
21:00	Scoring by quarter: 8–19, 13–14, 9–28, 9–12
	Pts: Mitrović, Wright 7 Rebs: Guerra 10; Asts: Guerra 3 PIR: Wright 9	Boxscore	Pts: Rodríguez 15; Rebs: Hernández-Sonseca 10; Asts: Pérez 6 PIR: Rodríguez 18	Arena: Paco Paz; Referees: Pagán Baró, Padrós Feliu

14 May 2017	Ourense Provincia Termal	66–74 (Series: 1–3)	Unión Financiera Baloncesto Oviedo	Ourense
18:00	Scoring by quarter: 13–14, 16–23, 17–18, 20–19
	Pts: Kapelan 18; Rebs: Wright 9 Asts: Guerra 5 PIR: Flis 19	Boxscore	Pts: Pérez 16; Rebs: Hernández-Sonseca, Jesperson 6 Asts: three players 2 PIR: Paul Jesperson, Jesperson, Pérez 18	Arena: Paco Paz; Referees: De Lucas de Lucas, Pinela García

=== Cafés Candelas Breogán v Palma Air Europa ===
5 May 2017	Cafés Candelas Breogán	77–65 (Series: 1–0)	Palma Air Europa	Lugo
20:45	Scoring by quarter: 19–20, 21–9, 16–24, 21–12
	Pts: Bropleh 18; Rebs: Cruz 13; Asts: Fernández, Franch 4 PIR: Cruz 23	Report	Pts: Bivià 14; Rebs: Grabauskas 9 Asts: Bivià, Uriz 4 PIR: Fornas 14	Arena: Pazo dos Deportes; Referees: Pagán Baró, López Herrada

7 May 2017	Cafés Candelas Breogán	94–9(OT) (Series: 1–1)	Palma Air Europa	Lugo
18:30	Scoring by quarter: 23–17, 19–18, 26–29, 17–21, Overtime: 9–14
	Pts: Stainbrook 18; Rebs: Cruz 11; Asts: Cruz 4 PIR: Stainbrook 23	Report	Pts: Bivià 31; Rebs: Zengotitabengoa 6 Asts: Bivià 6 PIR: Bivià 33	Arena: Pazo dos Deportes; Referees: De Lucas de Lucas, Carpallo Miguélez

12 May 2017	Palma Air Europa	64–58 (Series: 2–1)	Cafés Candelas Breogán	Inca
21:00	Scoring by quarter: 16–14, 16–17, 14–17, 18–10
	Pts: Uriz 15; Rebs: Uriz 8 Asts: Uriz, Zengotitabengoa 2 PIR: Uriz 25	Boxscore	Pts: Huertas 11; Rebs: Stainbrook 11; Asts: Fernández 2 PIR: Stainbrook 19	Arena: Palau Municipal; Referees: Terreros San Miguel, López Lecuona

14 May 2017	Palma Air Europa	90–100 (Series: 2–2)	Cafés Candelas Breogán	Palma
18:30	Scoring by quarter: 25–32, 13–23, 22–23, 30–22
	Pts: Grabauskas 20; Rebs: Medori 5 Asts: Uriz 6 PIR: Grabauskas 22	Boxscore	Pts: Cruz 18; Rebs: Cruz 18; Asts: Franch 4 PIR: Cruz 25	Arena: Son Moix; Referees: Vázquez García, Baena Arroyo

16 May 2017	Cafés Candelas Breogán	73–71 (Series: 3–2)	Palma Air Europa	Lugo
20:45	Scoring by quarter: 19–16, 18–17, 17–21, 19–17
	Pts: Bropleh 23; Rebs: Bropleh 7 Asts: Franch 4 PIR: Bropleh 28	Boxscore	Pts: Uriz 22; Rebs: Serrano 10; Asts: Uriz 4 PIR: Uriz 24	Arena: Pazo dos Deportes; Referees: Morales Ruiz, Mendoza Holgado

=== San Pablo Inmobiliaria Burgos v Club Melilla Baloncesto ===
5 May 2017	San Pablo Inmobiliaria Burgos	79–78 (Series: 1–0)	Club Melilla Baloncesto	Burgos
21:00	Scoring by quarter: 26–25, 13–20, 21–16, 19–17
	Pts: Huskić, Vega 14; Rebs: Barrera 6 Asts: Huskić, Steinarsson 4 PIR: Barrera, Huskić 19	Report	Pts: Ott 16; Rebs: Manzano, Van Wijk 6 Asts: Suka-Umu 6 PIR: Sanz 18	Arena: El Plantío; Referees: Pazos Pazos, Sánchez Sixto

7 May 2017	San Pablo Inmobiliaria Burgos	82–76 (Series: 2–0)	Club Melilla Baloncesto	Burgos
20:00	Scoring by quarter: 19–21, 20–17, 17–15, 26–23
	Pts: Martínez 18; Rebs: Vega 8 Asts: Steinarsson 4 PIR: Vega 19	Report	Pts: Suka-Umu 25; Rebs: Suka-Umu 9 Asts: Rivero 3 PIR: Suka-Umu 23	Arena: El Plantío; Referees: Morales García-Alcaide, Bravo Loroño

12 May 2017	Club Melilla Baloncesto	76–91 (Series: 0–3)	San Pablo Inmobiliaria Burgos	Melilla
21:00	Scoring by quarter: 17–16, 21–23, 19–24, 19–28
	Pts: Suka-Umu 19; Rebs: four players 4 Asts: Suka-Umu 7 PIR: Suka-Umu 22	Boxscore	Pts: Huskić 18; Rebs: Huskić 8 Asts: Huskić 4 PIR: Huskić 29	Arena: Javier Imbroda; Referees: García León, Iglesias Ambrosio

=== Quesos Cerrato Palencia v Leyma Coruña ===
5 May 2017	Quesos Cerrato Palencia	84–88 (Series: 0–1)	Leyma Coruña	Villamuriel de Cerrato
21:00	Scoring by quarter: 23–25, 30–20, 17–19, 14–24
	Pts: Rodríguez 17; Rebs: Otegui 9 Asts: Zamora 3 PIR: Pérez 16	Report	Pts: Monaghan 28; Rebs: Olmos 9 Asts: Olmos 3 PIR: Monaghan 27	Arena: Adolfo Nicolás; Referees: Muñoz García, Hurtado Almansa

7 May 2017	Quesos Cerrato Palencia	92–80 (Series: 1–1)	Leyma Coruña	Villamuriel de Cerrato
19:30	Scoring by quarter: 16–21, 24–24, 27–16, 25–19
	Pts: Samb 17; Rebs: Otegui 8 Asts: Rodríguez 5 PIR: Samb 21	Report	Pts: Žylė 16; Rebs: Sabonis, Žylė 7 Asts: Monaghan 6 PIR: Žylė 18	Arena: Adolfo Nicolás; Referees: Vázquez García, Torres Sánchez

12 May 2017	Leyma Coruña	104–94(OT) (Series: 2–1)	Quesos Cerrato Palencia	A Coruña
21:00	Scoring by quarter: 22–12, 24–21, 22–28, 20–27, Overtime: 16–6
	Pts: Đuran 17; Rebs: Sabonis 8 Asts: Monaghan 5 PIR: Sabonis 21	Boxscore	Pts: Rodríguez 35; Rebs: Samb 9 Asts: four players 3 PIR: Rodríguez 37	Arena: Riazor; Referees: Mendoza Holgado, Baena Arroyo

14 May 2017	Leyma Coruña	101–106 (Series: 2–2)	Quesos Cerrato Palencia	A Coruña
18:00	Scoring by quarter: 14–31, 25–33, 29–35, 33–17
	Pts: Monaghan 20; Rebs: Rowley 10; Asts: Monaghan 8 PIR: Monaghan 26	Boxscore	Pts: Rodríguez 24; Rebs: Barnes 5 Asts: Rodríguez 6 PIR: Rodríguez 33	Arena: Riazor; Referees: Morales Ruiz, Olivares Iglesias

16 May 2017	Quesos Cerrato Palencia	83–77 (Series: 3–2)	Leyma Coruña	Villamuriel de Cerrato
21:00	Scoring by quarter: 18–13, 25–20, 22–21, 18–23
	Pts: Blanch 18; Rebs: Otegui 7 Asts: Rodríguez 5 PIR: Blanch 20	Boxscore	Pts: three players 13; Rebs: Olmos 8 Asts: Monaghan 5 PIR: Olmos 17	Arena: Adolfo Nicolás; Referees: Zafra Guerra, Gómez López

== Semifinals ==
=== Unión Financiera Baloncesto Oviedo v Quesos Cerrato Palencia ===
19 May 2017	Unión Financiera Baloncesto Oviedo	74–76 (Series: 0–1)	Quesos Cerrato Palencia	Oviedo
21:00	Scoring by quarter: 20–16, 17–18, 18–22, 19–20
	Pts: Jesperson 15; Rebs: Dos Anjos, Jesperson 7 Asts: Pérez, Sans 3 PIR: Pérez 17	Boxscore	Pts: Barnes, Otegui 18; Rebs: Barnes, Otegui 8 Asts: Rodríguez 3 PIR: Barnes 30	Arena: Pumarín; Attendance: 1,164; Referees: De Lucas de Lucas, Morales García-Alcaide

21 May 2017	Unión Financiera Baloncesto Oviedo	74–68 (Series: 1–1)	Quesos Cerrato Palencia	Oviedo
18:00	Scoring by quarter: 19–12, 11–18, 21–17, 23–21
	Pts: Hernández-Sonseca 15; Rebs: Barro 12; Asts: Pérez 5 PIR: Barro 22	Boxscore	Pts: Blanch 13; Rebs: Samb 6 Asts: Pérez 4 PIR: Blanch 16	Arena: Pumarín; Attendance: 1,223; Referees: Vázquez García, Muñoz García

26 May 2017	Quesos Cerrato Palencia	81–70 (Series: 2–1)	Unión Financiera Baloncesto Oviedo	Villamuriel de Cerrato
21:00	Scoring by quarter: 17–15, 21–13, 16–25, 27–17
	Pts: Otegui 22; Rebs: four players 5 Asts: Tomàs 3 PIR: Otegui 24	Boxscore	Pts: Pérez 21; Rebs: Dos Anjos 7 Asts: Pérez 3 PIR: Pérez 26	Arena: Adolfo Nicolás; Referees: García León, López Herrada

28 May 2017	Quesos Cerrato Palencia	86–71 (Series: 3–1)	Unión Financiera Baloncesto Oviedo	Villamuriel de Cerrato
19:30	Scoring by quarter: 29–21, 25–18, 17–15, 15–17
	Pts: Maldūnas 20; Rebs: Maldūnas 8 Asts: Rodríguez 4 PIR: Otegui 21	Boxscore	Pts: Hernández-Sonseca 16; Rebs: Hernández-Sonseca 10; Asts: Santana 3 PIR: Hernández-Sonseca 19	Arena: Adolfo Nicolás; Referees: Pagán Baró, Terreros San Miguel

=== Cafés Candelas Breogán v San Pablo Inmobiliaria Burgos ===
19 May 2017	Cafés Candelas Breogán	80–93 (Series: 0–1)	San Pablo Inmobiliaria Burgos	Lugo
20:45	Scoring by quarter: 16–18, 26–27, 22–25, 16–23
	Pts: Franch 17; Rebs: Cruz 9 Asts: Bropleh, Ortega 4 PIR: Franch, Ortega 10	Boxscore	Pts: Huskić 21; Rebs: López 7 Asts: Soluade 3 PIR: Huskić 30	Arena: Pazo dos Deportes; Referees: Zafra Guerra, Torres Sánchez

21 May 2017	Cafés Candelas Breogán	79–88(OT) (Series: 0–2)	San Pablo Inmobiliaria Burgos	Lugo
18:00	Scoring by quarter: 14–26, 18–20, 21–20, 22–9, Overtime: 4–13
	Pts: Arco, Franch 20; Rebs: Cruz 10; Asts: Franch 5 PIR: Franch 24	Boxscore	Pts: Soluade 18; Rebs: Huskić 11; Asts: Huskić 5 PIR: Huskić 27	Arena: Pazo dos Deportes; Referees: Uruñuela Uruñuela, Quintas Álvarez

26 May 2017	San Pablo Inmobiliaria Burgos	92–81 (Series: 3–0)	Cafés Candelas Breogán	Burgos
21:00	Scoring by quarter: 20–17, 22–20, 29–31, 21–13
	Pts: Huskić 19; Rebs: López 5 Asts: Steinarsson 6 PIR: Huskić 28	Boxscore	Pts: Arco 16; Rebs: Cruz, Stainbrook 7 Asts: Fernández 5 PIR: Arco 20	Arena: El Plantío; Referees: Mendoza Holgado, Zamora Rodríguez

== Finals ==
2 June 2017	San Pablo Inmobiliaria Burgos	80–79 (Series: 1–0)	Quesos Cerrato Palencia	Burgos
21:00	Scoring by quarter: 14–26, 19–19, 21–19, 26–15
	Pts: Huskić 21; Rebs: Huskić 8 Asts: Huskić 3 PIR: Huskić 24	Boxscore	Pts: Samb 16; Rebs: Otegui 9 Asts: Blanch 5 PIR: Blanch 17	Arena: El Plantío; Referees: Pagán Baró, Gómez López

4 June 2017	San Pablo Inmobiliaria Burgos	90–82 (Series: 2–0)	Quesos Cerrato Palencia	Burgos
19:00	Scoring by quarter: 23–22, 20–23, 18–13, 29–24
	Pts: Huskić 22; Rebs: Huskić 13; Asts: Steinarsson 6 PIR: Huskić 31	Boxscore	Pts: Otegui 15; Rebs: Barnes 8 Asts: Zamora 5 PIR: Otegui 19	Arena: El Plantío; Referees: Vázquez García, Padrós Feliu

9 June 2017	Quesos Cerrato Palencia	75–76 (Series: 0–3)	San Pablo Inmobiliaria Burgos	Villamuriel de Cerrato
21:00	Scoring by quarter: 24–23, 20–16, 23–15, 18–32
	Pts: Otegui, Rodríguez 14; Rebs: Barnes, Otegui 6 Asts: Zamora 6 PIR: Blanch 19	Boxscore	Pts: Martínez 20; Rebs: Soluade 8 Asts: Soluade 5 PIR: Martínez 23	Arena: Adolfo Nicolás; Referees: De Lucas De Lucas, Olivares Iglesias
