= 2021 ACB Playoffs =

Tournament details
- Country: Spain
- Dates: 31 May–15 June 2021
- Teams: 8
- Defending champions: TD Systems Baskonia

Final positions
- Champions: Barça; 16th ACB title 19th Spanish title
- Runner-up: Real Madrid
- Semifinalists: Lenovo Tenerife; Valencia Basket

Tournament statistics
- Matches played: 18

The 2021 ACB Playoffs, also known as 2021 Liga Endesa Playoffs for sponsorship reasons, was the postseason tournament of the ACB's 2020–21 season, which began on 19 September 2020. The playoffs started on May 31 after the EuroLeague Final Four, which was played on May 28–30, and ended on June 15 before the Olympic Qualifying Tournaments, which will be played on June 29–July 4.

TD Systems Baskonia was the defending champion which got knocked out by Valencia Basket in the quarterfinals. Barça claimed their 16th ACB title and their 19th Spanish title, ending a 7-year drought, by downing archrivals Real Madrid in Game 2 of the Finals. Barça swept the series and completed its first Spanish double (League and Cup titles) since 2011.

== Format ==
On May 4, 2021, ACB delayed the regular season ending calendar one week to play the postponed matches. With Barça's already qualified to the EuroLeague Final Four in Cologne, the playoffs will be played in best-of-three, instead of best-of-five as usual. Only if there had been no Spanish representation in the Final Four, the finals would have been played to best-of-five.

At the end of the regular season, the eight teams with the most wins qualified for the playoffs. The seedings were based on each team's record. The bracket was fixed; there was no reseeding. All rounds were best-of-three series; the series ended when one team won two games, and that team advanced to the next round. All rounds, including the Finals, were in a 1–1–1 format. Home court advantage went to the team with the better regular season record, and, if needed, ties were broken based on head-to-head record.

== Playoff qualifying ==
On March 16, 2021, Real Madrid became the first team to clinch a playoff spot.

Seed	Team	Record	Clinched		
Seed	Team	Record	Playoff berth	Seeded team	Top seed
1	Real Madrid	34–2	March 16	April 8	May 20
2	Barça	32–4	March 23	April 14	–
3	Lenovo Tenerife	27–9	April 4	April 21	–
4	Valencia Basket	24–12	April 25	May 22	–
5	TD Systems Baskonia	23–13	April 14	–	–
6	Hereda San Pablo Burgos	22–14	April 28	–	–
7	Joventut	20–16	May 11	–	–
8	Herbalife Gran Canaria	18–18	May 23	–	–

== Bracket ==
Teams in bold advanced to the next round. The numbers to the left of each team indicate the team's seeding, the numbers to the right indicate the result of games including result in bold of the team that won in that game, and the numbers furthest to the right indicate the number of games the team won in that round.

Quarterfinals
**1**	**Real Madrid**	**103**	**81**	–	**2**
8	Herbalife Gran Canaria	79	75	–	0
**4**	**Valencia Basket**	**87**	65	**78**	**2**
5	TD Systems Baskonia	86	**76**	73	1
**2**	**Barça**	**84**	63	**94**	**2**
7	Joventut	74	**72**	73	1
**3**	**Lenovo Tenerife**	**86**	**92**	–	**2**
6	Hereda San Pablo Burgos	78	68	–	0

Semifinals
**1**	**Real Madrid**	**81**	67	**80**	**2**
4	Valencia Basket	70	**85**	77	1
**2**	**Barça**	**112**	68	**89**	**2**
3	Lenovo Tenerife	69	**80**	72	1

Finals
1	Real Madrid	75	73	–	0
**2**	**Barça**	**89**	**92**	–	**2**

== Quarterfinals ==
All times are in Central European Summer Time (UTC+02:00)

=== Real Madrid v Herbalife Gran Canaria ===
31 May 2021	**Real Madrid**	**103**–79 (Series: **1–0**)	Herbalife Gran Canaria	Madrid
22:00	Scoring by quarter: **34**–11, **22**–19, 22–**34**, **25**–15
	Pts: three players 14; Rebs: Poirier 11; Asts: Laprovíttola 6 PIR: Poirier 26	Boxscore	Pts: Costello 23; Rebs: Stević 6 Asts: Albicy, Dimša 4 PIR: Costello 23	Arena: WiZink Center; Attendance: 0 Referees: Fernando Calatrava, Sergio Manuel, Rubén Sánchez

2 June 2021	Herbalife Gran Canaria	75–**81** (Series: **0–2**)	**Real Madrid**	Las Palmas
22:00	Scoring by quarter: 15–**16**, 20–**21**, 16–**21**, **24**–23
	Pts: Slaughter 22; Rebs: Costello 11; Asts: Albicy 4 PIR: Slaughter 17	Boxscore	Pts: Fernández 15; Rebs: Tavares 12; Asts: three players 3 PIR: Fernández 17	Arena: Gran Canaria Arena; Attendance: 200; Referees: Carlos Peruga, Jorge Martínez, Esperanza Mendoza

Regular season series
Madrid won 2–0 in the regular season series

11 October 2020

Boxscore

Herbalife Gran Canaria	65–**90**	**Real Madrid**

Gran Canaria Arena, Las Palmas

31 January 2021

Boxscore

**Real Madrid**	**81**–80	Herbalife Gran Canaria

WiZink Center, Madrid

This was the fourth playoff meeting between these two teams, with Real Madrid winning the previous three meetings.

Previous playoff series
Madrid leads 3–0 in all-time playoff series

2000

**Real Madrid Teka**	**3**–0	Canarias Telecom

2000 Quarterfinals

2015

**Real Madrid**	**2**–0	Herbalife Gran Canaria

2015 Quarterfinals

2018

**Real Madrid**	**3**–0	Herbalife Gran Canaria

2018 Semifinals

=== Barça v Joventut ===
1 June 2021	**Barça**	**84**–74 (Series: **1–0**)	Joventut	Barcelona
22:00	Scoring by quarter: **26**–18, 14–**20**, **20**–12, 24–24
	Pts: Bolmaro 16; Rebs: Gasol 6 Asts: Bolmaro, Hanga 4 PIR: Gasol 18	Boxscore	Pts: Tomić 17; Rebs: Tomić 8 Asts: Dimitrijević 3 PIR: Brodziansky 19	Arena: Palau Blaugrana; Attendance: 0 Referees: Óscar Perea, Martín Caballero, Cristóbal Sánchez

3 June 2021	**Joventut**	**72**–63 (Series: **1–1**)	Barça	Badalona
22:00	Scoring by quarter: **23**–13, 8–**14**, **18**–17, **23**–19
	Pts: Bassas 20; Rebs: Parra 7 Asts: Tomić 7 PIR: Bassas 19	Boxscore	Pts: Higgins 13; Rebs: Davies 8 Asts: Higgins 5 PIR: Mirotić 19	Arena: Palau Municipal d'Esports; Attendance: 1,000; Referees: Juan Carlos García, Vicente Bultó, Alfonso Olivares

5 June 2021	**Barça**	**94**–73 (Series: **2–1**)	Joventut	Barcelona
18:30	Scoring by quarter: **25**–21, **20**–17, **37**–14, 12–**21**
	Pts: Kuric 22; Rebs: Abrines 7 Asts: Calathes 9 PIR: Kuric 24	Boxscore	Pts: Tomić 17; Rebs: Tomić, Ventura 5 Asts: Dimitrijević 6 PIR: Tomić 23	Arena: Palau Blaugrana; Attendance: 1,000; Referees: Antonio Conde, Fernando Calatrava, Arnau Padrós

Regular season series
Barça won 2–0 in the regular season series

20 December 2020

Boxscore

**Barça**	**88**–74	Joventut

Palau Blaugrana, Barcelona

28 February 2021

Boxscore

Joventut	62–**80**	**Barça**

Palau Municipal d'Esports, Badalona

This was the 13th playoff meeting between these two teams, with Barça winning nine of the first 12 meetings.

Previous playoff series
Barça leads 9–3 in all-time playoff series

1985

FC Barcelona	1–**2**	**Ron Negrita Joventut**

1985 Semifinals

1986

**FC Barcelona**	**2**–1	Ron Negrita Joventut

1986 Semifinals

1987

**FC Barcelona**	**3**–1	Ron Negrita Joventut

1987 Finals

1988

**FC Barcelona**	**3**–2	Ram Joventut

1988 Semifinals

1990

**FC Barcelona**	**3**–0	Ram Joventut Badalona

1990 Finals

1991

**Montigalá Joventut**	**3**–1	FC Barcelona

1991 Finals

1993

**Marbella Joventut**	**3**–2	FC Barcelona Banca Catalana

1993 Semifinals

1994

**FC Barcelona Banca Catalana**	**3**–2	7Up Joventut

1994 Semifinals

1998

Festina Joventut	1–**3**	**FC Barcelona Banca Catalana**

1998 Quarterfinals

2008

DKV Joventut	0–**2**	**AXA FC Barcelona**

2008 Semifinals

2015

**FC Barcelona**	**2**–0	FIATC Joventut

2015 Quarterfinals

2019

**Barça Lassa**	**2**–0	Divina Seguros Joventut

2019 Quarterfinals

=== Lenovo Tenerife v Hereda San Pablo Burgos ===
1 June 2021	**Lenovo Tenerife**	**86**–78 (Series: **1–0**)	Hereda San Pablo Burgos	San Cristóbal de La Laguna
19:45	Scoring by quarter: **19**–14, 26–**28**, **21**–13, 20–**23**
	Pts: Shermadini 16; Rebs: Shermadini 6 Asts: Huertas 5 PIR: Shermadini 24	Boxscore	Pts: Salvó 14; Rebs: Salvó 7 Asts: Cook 6 PIR: Salvó 21	Arena: Santiago Martín; Attendance: 0 Referees: Miguel Ángel Pérez, Jordi Aliaga, Vicente Martínez

3 June 2021	Hereda San Pablo Burgos	68–**92** (Series: **0–2**)	**Lenovo Tenerife**	Burgos
19:45	Scoring by quarter: **26**–23, **15**–12, 11–**31**, 16–**26**
	Pts: Kravić 20; Rebs: Kravić 7 Asts: Renfroe 5 PIR: Kravić 23	Boxscore	Pts: Huertas 20; Rebs: Sulejmanović 5 Asts: Huertas 9 PIR: Huertas 28	Arena: Coliseum Burgos; Attendance: 879; Referees: Antonio Conde, Luis Miguel Castillo, Alberto Baena

Regular season series
Tenerife won 2–0 in the regular season series

12 December 2020

Boxscore

**Iberostar Tenerife**	**85**–79	Hereda San Pablo Burgos

Santiago Martín, San Cristóbal de La Laguna

8 April 2021

Boxscore

Hereda San Pablo Burgos	86–**98**	**Lenovo Tenerife**

Coliseum Burgos, Burgos

This was the first meeting in the playoffs between Lenovo Tenerife and Hereda San Pablo Burgos.

=== Valencia Basket v TD Systems Baskonia ===
31 May 2021	**Valencia Basket**	**87**–86 (Series: **1–0**)	TD Systems Baskonia	Valencia
19:45	Scoring by quarter: **22**–18, 13–**26**, **25**–19, **27**–23
	Pts: Dubljević 20; Rebs: Kalinić 7 Asts: Van Rossom 7 PIR: Kalinić 24	Boxscore	Pts: Peters 16; Rebs: Polonara 7 Asts: Colom, Henry 3 PIR: Henry 18	Arena: La Fonteta; Attendance: 1,500; Referees: Daniel Hierrezuelo, Juan de Dios Oyón, Joaquín García

2 June 2021	**TD Systems Baskonia**	**76**–65 (Series: **1–1**)	Valencia Basket	Vitoria-Gasteiz
19:45	Scoring by quarter: **26**–16, **15**–12, **21**–18, 14–**19**
	Pts: Giedraitis 15; Rebs: Giedraitis 7 Asts: Henry 10; PIR: Giedraitis 24	Boxscore	Pts: Prepelič 20; Rebs: Dubljević 9 Asts: Van Rossom 3 PIR: Prepelič 15	Arena: Buesa Arena; Attendance: 0 Referees: Emilio Pérez, Arnau Padrós, Javier Torres

4 June 2021	**Valencia Basket**	**78**–73 (Series: **2–1**)	TD Systems Baskonia	Valencia
22:00	Scoring by quarter: **23**–19, **20**–15, 16–**19**, 19–**20**
	Pts: Kalinić 18; Rebs: Kalinić 7 Asts: Van Rossom 6 PIR: Kalinić 29	Boxscore	Pts: Dragić 16; Rebs: Jekiri 6 Asts: Henry 8 PIR: Polonara 20	Arena: La Fonteta; Attendance: 1,000; Referees: Miguel Ángel Pérez, Carlos Peruga, Alberto Sánchez

Regular season series
Tied 1–1 in the regular season series

20 September 2020

Boxscore

**TD Systems Baskonia**	**76**–73	Valencia Basket

Buesa Arena, Vitoria-Gasteiz

24 January 2021

Boxscore

**Valencia Basket**	**83**–61	TD Systems Baskonia

La Fonteta, Valencia

This was the fifth playoff meeting between these two teams, with TD Systems Baskonia winning three of the first four meetings.

Previous playoff series
Baskonia leads 3–1 in all-time playoff series

1991

**Taugrés**	**2**–0	Pamesa Valencia

1991 First round

2002

**TAU Cerámica**	**3**–1	Pamesa Valencia

2002 Quarterfinals

2008

**TAU Cerámica**	**2**–1	Pamesa Valencia

2008 Quarterfinals

2017

Baskonia	1–**3**	**Valencia Basket**

2017 Semifinals

== Semifinals ==
All times are in Central European Summer Time (UTC+02:00)

=== Real Madrid v Valencia Basket ===
6 June 2021	**Real Madrid**	**81**–70 (Series: **1–0**)	Valencia Basket	Madrid
18:30	Scoring by quarter: **25**–14, 19–**24**, **14**–8, 23–**24**
	Pts: Causeur 24; Rebs: Garuba 12; Asts: Alocén 8 PIR: Tavares 27	Boxscore	Pts: Hermannsson, Labeyrie 11; Rebs: Dubljević 12; Asts: Kalinić 4 PIR: Dubljević 16	Arena: WiZink Center; Attendance: 1,000; Referees: Emilio Pérez, Jordi Aliaga, Luis Miguel Castillo

8 June 2021	**Valencia Basket**	**85**–67 (Series: **1–1**)	Real Madrid	Valencia
21:15	Scoring by quarter: **24**–18, **20**–11, **20**–19, **21**–19
	Pts: Labeyrie 18; Rebs: Dubljević 7 Asts: Hermannsson 5 PIR: Labeyrie 22	Boxscore	Pts: Carroll 13; Rebs: Tyus 6 Asts: Alocén, Taylor 3 PIR: Tyus 12	Arena: La Fonteta; Attendance: 1,000; Referees: Carlos Peruga, Óscar Perea, Alberto Sánchez

10 June 2021	**Real Madrid**	**80**–77 (Series: **2–1**)	Valencia Basket	Madrid
22:00	Scoring by quarter: **22**–18, 20–**21**, **17**–16, 21–**22**
	Pts: Garuba 16; Rebs: Garuba 14; Asts: Llull 5 PIR: Garuba 23	Boxscore	Pts: Kalinić 13; Rebs: Labeyrie 5 Asts: Van Rossom 3 PIR: Kalinić, Tobey 14	Arena: WiZink Center; Attendance: 1,000; Referees: Antonio Conde, Carlos Peruga, Jordi Aliaga

Regular season series
Tied 1–1 in the regular season series

1 November 2020

Boxscore

Valencia Basket	78–**86**	**Real Madrid**

La Fonteta, Valencia

9 May 2021

Boxscore

Real Madrid	69–**79**	**Valencia Basket**

WiZink Center, Madrid

This was the seventh playoff meeting between these two teams, with Real Madrid winning five of the first six meetings.

Previous playoff series
Madrid leads 5–1 in all-time playoff series

1998

**Real Madrid Teka**	**3**–1	Pamesa Valencia

1998 Quarterfinals

2007

**Real Madrid**	**3**–1	Pamesa Valencia

2007 Quarterfinals

2015

**Real Madrid**	**3**–1	Valencia Basket

2015 Semifinals

2016

**Real Madrid**	**3**–1	Valencia Basket

2016 Semifinals

2017

Real Madrid	1–**3**	**Valencia Basket**

2017 Finals

2019

**Real Madrid**	**3**–0	Valencia Basket

2019 Semifinals

=== Barça v Lenovo Tenerife ===
7 June 2021	**Barça**	**112**–69 (Series: **1–0**)	Lenovo Tenerife	Barcelona
21:15	Scoring by quarter: 18–18, **25**–18, **40**–18, **29**–15
	Pts: Mirotić 21; Rebs: Abrines 6 Asts: Calathes 7 PIR: Mirotić 23	Boxscore	Pts: Guerra 14; Rebs: Shermadini 4 Asts: Fitipaldo 7 PIR: Guerra 12	Arena: Palau Blaugrana; Attendance: 1,000; Referees: Juan Carlos García, Fernando Calatrava, Martín Caballero

9 June 2021	**Lenovo Tenerife**	**80**–68 (Series: **1–1**)	Barça	San Cristóbal de La Laguna
21:15	Scoring by quarter: 15–**19**, **23**–16, 20–20, **22**–13
	Pts: Huertas 26; Rebs: Shermadini 10; Asts: Huertas 11; PIR: Shermadini 37	Boxscore	Pts: Gasol 15; Rebs: Mirotić 9 Asts: Calathes 4 PIR: Gasol 21	Arena: Santiago Martín; Attendance: 1,000; Referees: Emilio Pérez, Antonio Conde, Sergio Manuel

11 June 2021	**Barça**	**89**–72 (Series: **2–1**)	Lenovo Tenerife	Barcelona
22:00	Scoring by quarter: **23**–21, **23**–18, **22**–11, 21–**22**
	Pts: Gasol 15; Rebs: Gasol 5 Asts: Mirotić 4 PIR: Gasol 24	Boxscore	Pts: Doornekamp 19; Rebs: Doornekamp 5 Asts: Huertas 9 PIR: Doornekamp 22	Arena: Palau Blaugrana; Attendance: 1,000; Referees: Emilio Pérez, Fernando Calatrava, Luis Miguel Castillo

Regular season series
Barça won 2–0 in the regular season series

1 November 2020

Boxscore

**Barça**	**81**–74	Iberostar Tenerife

Palau Blaugrana, Barcelona

22 May 2021

Boxscore

Lenovo Tenerife	72–**96**	**Barça**

Santiago Martín, San Cristóbal de La Laguna

This was the first meeting in the playoffs between Barça and Lenovo Tenerife.

== Finals ==
All times are in Central European Summer Time (UTC+02:00)

13 June 2021	Real Madrid	75–**89** (Series: **0–1**)	**Barça**	Madrid
18:30	Scoring by quarter: **20**–15, 16–**18**, 16–**29**, 23–**27**
	Pts: Tavares 16; Rebs: Tavares 11; Asts: Llull 3 PIR: Tavares 26	Boxscore	Pts: Higgins 26; Rebs: Gasol 8 Asts: Calathes 4 PIR: Higgins 26	Arena: WiZink Center; Attendance: 1,000; Referees: Carlos Peruga, Jordi Aliaga, Martín Caballero

15 June 2021	**Barça**	**92**–73 (Series: **2–0**)	Real Madrid	Barcelona
22:00	Scoring by quarter: **26**–15, **22**–15, **29**–25, 15–**18**
	Pts: Mirotić 27; Rebs: Gasol, Šmits 6 Asts: Calathes 7 PIR: Mirotić 35	Boxscore	Pts: Abalde 15; Rebs: Tavares 6 Asts: Alocén 5 PIR: Abalde 21	Arena: Palau Blaugrana; Attendance: 1,000; Referees: Antonio Conde, Emilio Pérez, Luis Miguel Castillo

Regular season series
Tied 1–1 in the regular season series

27 December 2020

Boxscore

Real Madrid	82–**87**	**Barça**

WiZink Center, Madrid

11 April 2021

Boxscore

Barça	85–**87**	**Real Madrid**

Palau Blaugrana, Barcelona

This was the 20th playoff meeting between these two teams, with Real Madrid winning 10 of the first 19 meetings.

Previous playoff series
Madrid leads 10–9 in all-time playoff series

1984

**Real Madrid**	**2**–1	FC Barcelona

1984 Finals

1986

**Real Madrid**	**2**–0	FC Barcelona

1986 Finals

1987

**FC Barcelona**	**3**–1	Real Madrid

1987 Semifinals

1988

**FC Barcelona**	**3**–2	Real Madrid

1988 Finals

1989

**FC Barcelona**	**3**–2	Real Madrid

1989 Finals

1992

**Real Madrid Asegurator**	**2**–0	FC Barcelona

1992 Quarterfinals

1994

**Real Madrid Teka**	**3**–0	FC Barcelona Banca Catalana

1994 Finals

1995

**FC Barcelona Banca Catalana**	**3**–2	Real Madrid Teka

1995 Semifinals

1997

Real Madrid Teka	2–**3**	**FC Barcelona Banca Catalana**

1997 Finals

2000

FC Barcelona	2–**3**	**Real Madrid Teka**

2000 Finals

2001

**FC Barcelona**	**3**–0	Real Madrid

2001 Finals

2006

**Winterthur FC Barcelona**	**3**–1	Real Madrid

2006 Quarterfinals

2007

**Real Madrid**	**3**–1	Winterthur FC Barcelona

2007 Finals

2012

**FC Barcelona Regal**	**3**–2	Real Madrid

2012 Finals

2013

**Real Madrid**	**3**–2	FC Barcelona Regal

2013 Finals

2014

Real Madrid	1–**3**	**FC Barcelona**

2014 Finals

2015

**Real Madrid**	**3**–0	FC Barcelona

2015 Finals

2016

FC Barcelona Lassa	1–**3**	**Real Madrid**

2016 Finals

2019

**Real Madrid**	**3**–1	Barça Lassa

2019 Finals
