= 2018–19 CB Miraflores season =

San Pablo Burgos
2018–19 season
- Chairman: Félix Sancho
- Head coach: Diego Epifanio
- Arena: Coliseum Burgos
Home	Away	Third

The 2018–19 CB Miraflores season will be the fourth in existence and their second in the Liga ACB, the top flight of Spanish basketball, of this club, called San Pablo Burgos for sponsorship reasons.

== Players ==
=== Squad information ===
Note: Flags indicate national team eligibility at FIBA-sanctioned events. Players may hold other non-FIBA nationalities not displayed.

San Pablo Burgos roster
Players
Coaches

Pos.	No.	Nat.	Name	Ht.	Age
SG	9	(Spain)	Barrera, Álex	1.96 m (6 ft 5 in)	33 – 1 April 1992
SF	31	(Slovenia)	Čančar, Vlatko	2.01 m (6 ft 7 in)	28 – 10 April 1997
PG		(Uruguay)	Fitipaldo, Bruno	1.83 m (6 ft 0 in)	34 – 2 August 1991
SG		(United States)	Frazier, Branden	1.91 m (6 ft 3 in)	33 – 23 July 1992
C	23	(Serbia)	Huskić, Goran	2.10 m (6 ft 11 in)	33 – 26 March 1992
PG		(Serbia)	Jaramaz, Ognjen	1.93 m (6 ft 4 in)	30 – 1 September 1995
C		(Ukraine)	Kravtsov, Viacheslav	2.13 m (7 ft 0 in)	38 – 25 August 1987
SG	25	(Spain)	López, Álex	1.89 m (6 ft 2 in)	34 – 8 May 1991
SF		(Montenegro)	Radončić, Dino	2.02 m (6 ft 8 in)	26 – 8 January 1999
PF	21	(United States)	Thompson, Deon	2.03 m (6 ft 8 in)	37 – 16 September 1988
PF	10	(Spain)	Vega, Javi (C)	2.05 m (6 ft 9 in)	37 – 5 January 1988

Head coach

- (Spain) Diego Epifanio

Legend

- (C) Team captain
- Injured

- Roster
Updated: August 8, 2018

== Club ==
=== Technical staff ===
Position	Staff
Head coach	Diego Epifanio
Assistant coach	Francisco J. Hernández; Alberto Codeso
Delegate	Raúl Santamaría
Fitness trainer	Dani Hernández

Source: CB Miraflores

== Competitions ==
=== Liga ACB ===
==== League table ====
Pos	Team	Pld	W	L	PF	PA	PD
9	Iberostar Tenerife	34	17	17	2772	2710	+62
10	MoraBanc Andorra	34	16	18	2815	2785	+30
11	San Pablo Burgos	34	15	19	2816	2839	−23
12	Herbalife Gran Canaria	34	14	20	2828	2873	−45
13	Montakit Fuenlabrada	34	13	21	2788	3021	−233

Source: ACB

==== Results summary ====
Overall						Home					Away				
Pld	W	L	PF	PA	PD	W	L	PF	PA	PD	W	L	PF	PA	PD
9	3	6	718	754	−36	3	2	415	409	+6	0	4	303	345	−42

Source: ACB.com

==== Results by round ====
Round	1	2	3	4	5	6	7	8	9	10	11	12	13	14	15	16	17	18	19	20	21	22	23	24	25	26	27	28	29	30	31	32	33	34
Ground	A	H	H	A	H	A	H	A	H	H	A																							
Result	L	W	L	L	W	L	W	L	L	W	L																							
Position	13	9	15	16	10	11	9	11	13	11	13																							

Source: ACB.com
A = Away; H = Home; W = Win; L = Loss

==== Matches ====
29 September 2018 1	Monbus Obradoiro	91–81	San Pablo Burgos	Santiago de Compostela
20:30	Scoring by quarter: 22–17, 23–15, 24–24, 22–25
	Pts: Vasileiadis 20; Rebs: Brodziansky 8 Asts: Pozas 6 PIR: Llovet 24	Boxscore	Pts: Čančar 13; Rebs: Radončić 5 Asts: Fitipaldo, Huskić 5 PIR: Kravtsov 16	Arena: Fontes do Sar; Attendance: 4,825; Referees: Martín Bertrán, Calatrava, Sánchez Sixto

3 October 2018 2	San Pablo Burgos	82–79	Kirolbet Baskonia	Burgos
20:45	Scoring by quarter: 24–18, 19–20, 25–27, 14–14
	Pts: Frazier 14; Rebs: Čančar 9 Asts: Fitipaldo 10; PIR: Čančar, Thompson 15	Boxscore	Pts: Shengelia 18; Rebs: Poirier 9 Asts: three players 2 PIR: Shengelia 21	Arena: Coliseum Burgos; Attendance: 8,825; Referees: Pérez Pérez, Serrano, Martínez

6 October 2018 3	San Pablo Burgos	79–93	Tecnyconta Zaragoza	Burgos
18:15	Scoring by quarter: 17–16, 15–26, 16–23, 31–28
	Pts: Čančar 16; Rebs: Kravtsov 8 Asts: Fitipaldo 5 PIR: Kravtsov 20	Boxscore	Pts: Justiz, Okoye 14; Rebs: Martín 8 Asts: McCalebb 6 PIR: McCalebb 21	Arena: Coliseum Burgos; Attendance: 9,107; Referees: Conde, Manuel, González Gálvez

14 October 2018 4	UCAM Murcia	72–62	San Pablo Burgos	Murcia
12:30	Scoring by quarter: 20–15, 19–19, 11–15, 22–13
	Pts: three players 11; Rebs: Cățe, Delía 7 Asts: Doyle 4 PIR: Kloof 16	Boxscore	Pts: Frazier 13; Rebs: Huskić 7 Asts: Fitipaldo 5 PIR: Huskić 16	Arena: Palacio de Deportes; Attendance: 5,036; Referees: Cortés, García Ortiz, Zamorano

20 October 2018 5	San Pablo Burgos	92–76	Cafés Candelas Breogán	Burgos
18:00	Scoring by quarter: 26–14, 21–20, 19–19, 26–23
	Pts: Thompson 17; Rebs: Huskić 9 Asts: Fitipaldo 5 PIR: Thompson 19	Boxscore	Pts: Redivo 17; Rebs: Sulejmanović 7 Asts: Díaz 3 PIR: Jordan 18	Arena: Coliseum Burgos; Attendance: 9,157; Referees: Peruga, Oyón, Mendoza

28 October 2018 6	Real Madrid	90–77	San Pablo Burgos	Madrid
12:30	Scoring by quarter: 21–19, 21–17, 28–22, 20–19
	Pts: Llull 19; Rebs: Kuzmić 7 Asts: Llull 4 PIR: Llull 24	Boxscore	Pts: Čančar 24; Rebs: three players 5 Asts: Huskić 7 PIR: Čančar 23	Arena: WiZink Center; Attendance: 8,529; Referees: Pérez Pizarro, Martínez, Caballero

3 November 2018 7	San Pablo Burgos	88–79	Unicaja	Burgos
20:30	Scoring by quarter: 22–16, 16–21, 24–16, 26–26
	Pts: Thompson 21; Rebs: Frazier, Thompson 5 Asts: Huskić 4 PIR: Thompson 23	Boxscore	Pts: Salin 14; Rebs: Díez, Suárez 6 Asts: Fernández 11; PIR: Fernández 23	Arena: Coliseum Burgos; Attendance: 9,178; Referees: Conde, Aliaga, Rial

10 November 2018 8	Delteco GBC	92–83	San Pablo Burgos	San Sebastián
20:30	Scoring by quarter: 22–21, 16–17, 21–21, 33–24
	Pts: Corbacho 25; Rebs: Burjanadze 6 Asts: Pérez 7 PIR: Corbacho 24	Boxscore	Pts: Thompson 17; Rebs: Huskić 9 Asts: Huskić 5 PIR: Huskić 19	Arena: Donostia Arena; Attendance: 4,033; Referees: Hierrezuelo, Manuel, Merino

17 November 2018 9	San Pablo Burgos	74–82	Baxi Manresa	Burgos
20:30	Scoring by quarter: 24–21, 15–23, 21–19, 14–19
	Pts: Thompson 17; Rebs: Huskić 7 Asts: Frazier 3 PIR: Thompson 19	Boxscore	Pts: Toolson 19; Rebs: Lalanne 6 Asts: Renfroe 4 PIR: Lundberg 18	Arena: Coliseum Burgos; Attendance: 9,237; Referees: García González, Araña, Sánchez Sixto

25 November 2018 10	San Pablo Burgos	79–68	Iberostar Tenerife	Burgos
17:00	Scoring by quarter: 20–23, 23–18, 18–15, 25–12
	Pts: Huskić, Thompson 14; Rebs: Huskić 8 Asts: Huskić 9 PIR: Thompson 26	Boxscore	Pts: McFadden 20; Rebs: Beirán 9 Asts: San Miguel 6 PIR: Beirán 21	Arena: Coliseum Burgos; Attendance: 9,243; Referees: Pérez Pérez, Bultó, Sánchez Mohedas

9 December 2018 11	Movistar Estudiantes	80–79	San Pablo Burgos	Madrid
12:30	Scoring by quarter: 13–16, 22–15, 20–23, 25–25
	Pts: Gentile 22; Rebs: Caner-Medley 11; Asts: Cook 8 PIR: Cook 22	Boxscore	Pts: Huskić 19; Rebs: Thompson 10; Asts: Huskić 6 PIR: Huskić 26	Arena: WiZink Center; Attendance: 8,564; Referees: Jiménez Trujillo, Martínez, Mendoza

== Statistics ==
Legend
GP	Games played	GS	Games started	MPG	Minutes per game
FG%	Field-goal percentage	3FG%	3-point field-goal percentage	FT%	Free-throw percentage
RPG	Rebounds per game	APG	Assists per game	SPG	Steals per game
BPG	Blocks per game	PPG	Points per game	PIR	PIR per game
