= 2016–17 LEB Oro season =

21st season of the Spanish basketball second league

LEB Oro
- Season: 2016–17
- Games played: 306 (Regular season); 21–35 (Playoffs)
- Teams: 18

Regular season
- Top seed: Unión Financiera Oviedo

Finals
- Champions: RETAbet.es GBC

Records
- Biggest away win: Cáceres 50–113 Breogán (14 October 2016); Biggest win in the LEB Oro history

The 2016–17 LEB Oro season will be the 21st season of the Spanish basketball second league LEB Oro. Dates must be determined yet.

== Teams ==
On 20 July 2016 the Spanish Basketball Federation confirmed the expansion of the league to 18 teams. The 2010–11 season was the last one with this number.

Despite its promotion, on 23 July 2016 Sáenz Horeca Araberri Basket announced that it could not fulfill the requirements in the league. However, almost one month later the club was allowed to participate in the league.

=== Promotion and relegation (pre-season) ===
Teams relegated from the 2015–16 Liga ACB

- ~~Movistar Estudiantes~~ (will play in ACB as Quesos Cerrato Palencia resigned to promote due to the impossibility to fulfill the requirements)
- RETAbet.es GBC

Teams promoted from the 2015–16 LEB Plata

- Marín Peixegalego
- Sáenz Horeca Araberri Basket

Teams promoted after the expansion of the league

- Actel Força Lleida (was relegated in the previous season)

=== Venues and locations ===
Location of teams in 2016–17 LEB Oro season

Team	City	Arena	Capacity
Actel Força Lleida	Lleida	Pavelló Barris Nord	6,100
Cáceres Patrimonio de la Humanidad	Cáceres	Multiusos Ciudad de Cáceres	6,500
Cafés Candelas Breogán	Lugo	Pazo dos Deportes	6,500
CB Prat	El Prat de Llobregat	Pavelló Joan Busquets	1,000
Club Melilla Baloncesto	Melilla	Pabellón Javier Imbroda Ortiz	3,800
Calzados Robusta	Logroño	Palacio de los Deportes	3,851
FC Barcelona Lassa B	Sant Joan Despí	Ciutat Esportiva Joan Gamper	472
Leyma Coruña	A Coruña	Pazo dos Deportes de Riazor	3,500
Magia Huesca	Huesca	Palacio Municipal de Huesca	5,018
Marín Peixegalego	Marín	Pabellón de A Raña	1,500
Ourense Provincia Termal	Ourense	Pazo Paco Paz	6,000
Palma Air Europa	Palma	Son Moix	5,076
Quesos Cerrato Palencia (Note: Palencia played the playoffs in Villamuriel de Cerrato due to the start of the expansion works of the Pabellón Marta Domínguez.)	Palencia	Pabellón Marta Domínguez	1,806
Quesos Cerrato Palencia	Villamuriel de Cerrato	Pabellón Adolfo Nicolás	1,500
RETAbet.es GBC	San Sebastián	José Antonio Gasca	2,500
Sáenz Horeca Araberri Basket	Vitoria-Gasteiz	Mendizorrotza	2,603
San Pablo Inmobiliaria Burgos	Burgos	Polideportivo El Plantío	2,500
TAU Castelló	Castellón de la Plana	Pabellón Ciutat de Castelló	5,500
Unión Financiera Baloncesto Oviedo	Oviedo	Polideportivo de Pumarín	1,250

=== Personnel and kit manufacturers ===
Team	Chairman	Head coach	Kit manufacturer
Actel Força Lleida	Félix González	Borja Comenge	Joma
Cáceres Patrimonio de la Humanidad	José Manuel Sánchez	Ñete Bohígas	Vive
Cafés Candelas Breogán	Antonio Veiga	Natxo Lezkano	Élide
CB Prat	Arseni Conde	Roberto Sánchez	Austral
Club Melilla Baloncesto	Jaime Auday	Alejandro Alcoba	Vive
Calzados Robusta	Manuel de Miguel	Antonio Pérez	Mercury
FC Barcelona Lassa B	Josep Maria Bartomeu	Alfred Julbe	Nike
Leyma Coruña	Juan Carlos Fernández	Tito Díaz	Altius
Magia Huesca	Antonio Orús	Guillermo Arenas	Barri
Marín Peixegalego	José Luis Santiago	Javier Llorente	Trezze
Ourense Provincia Termal	Jorge Bermello	Gonzalo García	Vive
Palma Air Europa	Fernando Moral	Xavi Sastre	Altius
Quesos Cerrato Palencia	Gonzalo Ibáñez	Sergio García	Discóbolo
RETAbet.es GBC	Nekane Arzallus	Porfirio Fisac	Mercury
Sáenz Horeca Araberri Basket	Óscar Vázquez	Arturo Álvarez	Wibo
San Pablo Inmobiliaria Burgos	Jesús Martínez	Diego Epifanio	Hummel
TAU Castelló	Luis García	Antonio Ten	Score
Unión Financiera Baloncesto Oviedo	Fernando Villabella	Carles Marco	Royal

=== Managerial changes ===
Team	Outgoing manager	Manner of departure	Date of vacancy	Replaced with	Date of appointment	Position in table
Actel Força Lleida	Joaquín Prado	End of contract	15 April 2016	Borja Comenge	17 July 2016	Pre-season
Cafés Candelas Breogán	Quique Fraga	End of contract	3 May 2016	Natxo Lezkano	26 August 2016	Pre-season
Sáenz Horeca Araberri Basket	Sergio Jiménez	End of contract	13 May 2016	Arturo Álvarez	30 August 2016	Pre-season
Magia Huesca	Quim Costa	End of contract	15 July 2016	Sergio Jiménez	20 July 2016	Pre-season
Magia Huesca	Sergio Jiménez	Sacked	16 January 2017	Guillermo Arenas	17 January 2017	17th (4–16)

== Regular season ==
=== League table ===
Pos	Team	Pld	W	L	PF	PA	PD	Pts	Promotion, qualification or relegation
1	RETAbet.es GBC (C, P)	34	25	9	2598	2468	+130	59	Promotion to ACB
2	Cafés Candelas Breogán	34	24	10	3030	2737	+293	58	Qualification to playoffs
3	San Pablo Inmobiliaria Burgos	34	24	10	2787	2555	+232	58	Qualification to playoffs
4	Unión Financiera Baloncesto Oviedo (X)	34	22	12	2741	2603	+138	56	Qualification to playoffs
5	Quesos Cerrato Palencia	34	22	12	2779	2680	+99	56	Qualification to playoffs
6	Leyma Coruña	34	20	14	2748	2695	+53	54	Qualification to playoffs
7	Club Melilla Baloncesto	34	19	15	2642	2548	+94	53	Qualification to playoffs
8	Palma Air Europa	34	19	15	2708	2669	+39	53	Qualification to playoffs
9	Ourense Provincia Termal	34	18	16	2586	2557	+29	52	Qualification to playoffs
10	Actel Força Lleida	34	18	16	2612	2589	+23	52	
11	Cáceres Patrimonio de la Humanidad	34	14	20	2568	2766	−198	48	
12	Sáenz Horeca Araberri Basket	34	14	20	2664	2706	−42	48	
13	CB Prat	34	13	21	2626	2757	−131	47	
14	FC Barcelona Lassa B	34	13	21	2538	2606	−68	47	
15	TAU Castelló	34	12	22	2706	2779	−73	46	
16	Magia Huesca	34	11	23	2453	2623	−170	45	
17	Calzados Robusta (R)	34	10	24	2614	2743	−129	44	Relegation to LEB Plata
18	Marín Peixegalego (R)	34	8	26	2479	2798	−319	42	Relegation to LEB Plata

Source: LEB Oro
(C) Champions; (P) Promoted; (R) Relegated; (X) Top seeded team as Copa Princesa champion

=== Positions by round ===
The table lists the positions of teams after completion of each round.

Team \ Round	1	2	3	4	5	6	7	8	9	10	11	12	13	14	15	16	17	18	19	20	21	22	23	24	25	26	27	28	29	30	31	32	33	34
RETAbet.es GBC	5	4	2	3	3	2	5	4	4	1	4	3	5	2	2	4	3	2	3	2	3	2	3	1	2	1	1	1	1	1	1	1	1	1
Cafés Candelas Breogán	1	1	1	1	2	4	3	3	1	2	1	4	1	4	7	5	4	4	2	3	4	6	5	2	3	2	2	2	2	2	2	2	2	2
San Pablo Inmobiliaria Burgos	12	15	10	8	5	7	6	9	8	10	9	8	7	5	4	2	2	1	4	5	5	3	1	4	4	4	4	3	3	3	3	3	3	3
U. Financiera Baloncesto Oviedo	9	6	9	6	9	6	10	8	7	7	5	7	6	3	3	1	1	3	1	1	1	1	2	3	5	3	3	5	5	5	4	4	4	4
Quesos Cerrato Palencia	2	2	6	7	6	5	4	5	5	5	2	1	2	1	1	3	5	5	5	4	2	4	4	5	1	5	5	4	4	4	5	5	5	5
Leyma Coruña	6	7	8	5	4	3	2	1	3	3	3	2	4	6	8	7	6	6	7	6	6	5	7	7	7	7	7	6	7	9	8	6	7	6
Club Melilla Baloncesto	11	10	13	15	15	13	15	13	12	12	12	11	11	11	11	11	10	9	10	9	8	7	6	6	6	6	6	8	6	6	7	8	6	7
Palma Air Europa	14	12	12	9	11	8	7	10	9	8	10	10	10	10	10	10	11	13	12	12	11	11	10	10	10	10	10	10	9	8	9	9	9	8
Ourense Provincia Termal	10	14	14	13	10	12	8	6	10	9	7	6	9	8	9	6	7	8	8	8	9	9	8	8	8	8	8	7	8	7	6	7	8	9
Actel Força Lleida	7	5	4	2	1	1	1	2	2	4	6	5	3	7	5	8	9	10	9	10	10	10	9	9	9	9	9	9	10	10	10	10	10	10
Cáceres P. de la Humanidad	17	17	18	18	17	17	17	17	15	16	14	12	12	12	12	13	13	12	13	14	13	12	12	12	11	11	11	11	11	11	11	11	11	11
Sáenz Horeca Araberri Basket	4	11	6	11	8	10	9	7	6	6	8	9	8	9	6	9	8	7	6	7	7	8	11	11	12	12	12	12	12	12	12	12	12	12
CB Prat	3	3	3	4	7	9	11	12	11	11	13	14	14	14	14	14	14	14	14	13	14	14	14	14	14	14	14	14	14	14	14	14	14	13
FC Barcelona Lassa B	16	16	16	14	16	15	14	14	16	17	17	17	18	18	18	18	18	18	18	18	18	18	18	18	17	16	16	15	15	15	15	15	15	14
TAU Castelló	15	8	11	10	12	11	12	11	13	13	11	13	13	13	13	12	12	11	11	11	12	13	13	13	13	13	13	13	13	13	13	13	13	15
Magia Huesca	13	13	15	16	14	14	13	15	14	15	15	15	15	15	15	15	16	16	17	17	17	17	17	17	16	17	17	17	17	16	16	16	16	16
Calzados Robusta	18	18	17	17	18	18	18	18	18	18	18	18	16	16	16	16	15	15	15	15	15	15	15	15	15	15	15	16	16	17	17	17	17	17
Marín Peixegalego	8	9	7	12	13	16	16	16	17	14	16	16	17	17	17	17	17	17	16	16	16	16	16	16	18	18	18	18	18	18	18	18	18	18

=== Results ===
Home \ Away	FLL	CAC	BRE	PRA	MEL	ROB	FCB	COR	MAR	COB	PLM	HUE	PAL	GBC	ARA	SPA	CAS	OVI
Força Lleida		78–66	88–77	67–65	87–82	56–80	71–64	80–89	73–79	78–66	73–72	78–59	78–80	71–73	88–80	78–80	92–69	70–68
Cáceres	79–84		50–113	68–65	104–99	83–80	83–78	88–84	83–67	65–71	91–82	73–57	77–92	73–58	83–82	71–79	62–72	102–100
Breogán	78–81	84–78		90–76	80–76	90–84	85–70	104–73	88–66	87–74	88–62	71–74	89–87	86–92	80–88	87–76	82–65	95–78
Prat	74–73	66–88	84–92		77–87	79–70	77–78	76–81	96–81	84–72	56–82	93–78	62–81	80–70	106–100	65–73	84–101	79–97
Melilla	75–65	79–72	101–105	77–71		90–75	64–80	63–55	91–63	80–77	74–68	79–67	88–76	76–78	80–72	77–66	82–71	71–51
Clavijo	84–87	80–56	87–109	73–76	75–83		80–71	85–96	83–77	93–77	70–101	53–73	81–76	73–78	68–82	72–79	81–66	64–65
Barcelona B	79–74	88–75	82–93	72–84	61–67	83–77		69–84	92–74	70–79	69–77	97–84	65–74	55–63	78–70	71–76	68–81	90–82
Coruña	83–71	83–69	94–85	90–97	77–66	62–71	93–85		71–65	79–67	92–88	95–66	82–88	93–88	79–65	83–76	89–76	75–88
Marín	62–85	77–68	77–99	76–84	78–72	81–83	67–79	73–67		78–86	65–78	73–71	74–84	90–98	76–60	79–89	77–83	65–76
Ourense	76–60	79–55	75–88	74–79	77–72	79–72	69–71	81–71	74–54		79–82	81–65	68–76	79–85	71–76	62–58	82–81	72–77
Palma	92–82	97–83	96–86	84–72	85–82	94–79	63–86	86–73	80–69	95–107		79–72	77–79	67–75	70–63	62–57	101–89	69–83
Huesca	77–67	77–60	65–86	83–76	61–68	75–84	73–71	73–80	102–105	81–92	82–67		63–76	62–75	79–81	61–68	78–76	77–70
Palencia	77–85	89–74	97–89	88–77	87–84	89–77	67–69	79–75	94–61	83–77	78–79	77–69		92–83	82–94	65–93	79–78	72–70
GBC	71–65	81–70	80–65	76–65	66–61	75–70	87–81	86–68	83–64	65–70	78–73	69–58	73–69		69–54	78–66	83–81	87–78
Araberri	87–75	80–86	86–84	74–82	92–84	87–71	72–65	85–89	82–71	73–79	76–81	71–75	83–90	77–60		70–87	87–76	75–86
Burgos	81–88	91–69	83–92	87–64	89–75	100–89	85–77	86–89	69–67	79–60	85–66	86–78	97–71	85–78	97–84		105–81	106–83
Castelló	77–80	82–86	88–96	94–79	77–64	83–76	76–64	88–82	86–93	75–80	86–77	65–72	96–94	79–73	81–83	77–87		63–64
Oviedo	88–84	88–78	104–107	80–74	62–73	85–74	80–60	82–72	89–55	70–74	90–76	81–66	93–89	72–64	78–72	86–66	97–87	

Source: FEB.es
Legend: Blue = home team win; Red = away team win.

== Playoffs ==
Quarter-finals
C Unión Financiera Oviedo	85	78	73	74
9 Ourense Provincia Termal	92	60	39	66
5 Quesos Cerrato Palencia	84	92	94	106	83
6 Leyma Coruña	88	80	104	101	77
2 Cafés Candelas Breogán	77	94	58	100	73
8 Palma Air Europa	65	99	64	90	71
3 San Pablo Burgos	79	82	91
7 Club Melilla Baloncesto	78	76	76

Semi-finals
C Unión Financiera Oviedo	74	74	70	71
5 Quesos Cerrato Palencia	76	68	81	86
2 Cafés Candelas Breogán	80	79	81
3 San Pablo Burgos	93	88	92

Final
5 Quesos Cerrato Palencia	79	82	85
3 San Pablo Burgos	80	90	86

== Copa Princesa de Asturias ==
The Copa Princesa de Asturias will be played on 27 January 2017, by the two first qualified teams after the end of the first half of the season (round 17).

The Champion of this Cup will play the play-offs as first qualified if it finishes the league between the second and the fifth qualified.

=== Teams qualified ===
Pos	Team	Pld	W	L	PF	PA	PD	Pts
1	Unión Financiera Baloncesto Oviedo	17	13	4	1331	1267	+64	30
2	San Pablo Inmobiliaria Burgos	17	12	5	1381	1251	+130	29

Source: LEB Oro

=== The game ===
27 January 2017
18:00

Report

Unión Financiera Baloncesto Oviedo	80–77	San Pablo Inmobiliaria Burgos
Scoring by quarter: 27–18, 15–15, 17–24, 21–20
Pts: Löfberg 18; Rebs: Hernández-Sonseca 10; Asts: Löfberg 4 PIR: Salvó 26		Pts: Vega 19; Rebs: Huskić 10; Asts: Soluade 3 PIR: Vega 22
Unión Financiera Baloncesto Oviedo, champion of the Copa Princesa de Asturias

Polideportivo de Pumarín, Oviedo

== Stats leaders in regular season ==
=== Points ===
Rk	Name	Team	Games	Points	PPG
1	(United States) Zaid Hearst	Sáenz Horeca Araberri Basket	34	686	20.2
2	(Canada) Johnny Berhanemeskel	Sáenz Horeca Araberri Basket	32	606	18.9
3	(United States) Tim Derksen	Marín Peixegalego	34	618	18.2
4	(Dominican Republic) Dagoberto Peña	Leyma Coruña / FC Barcelona Lassa B	33	546	16.5
5	(United States) Garrett Nevels	Actel Força Lleida	34	556	16.3

=== Rebounds ===
Rk	Name	Team	Games	Rebounds	RPG
1	(Spain) Jordi Trias	FC Barcelona Lassa B	34	346	10.2
2	(Croatia) Sandi Marciuš	Cáceres Patrimonio de la Humanidad	34	264	7.8
3	(Serbia) Goran Huskić	San Pablo Inmobiliaria Burgos	33	244	7.4
4	(United States) Michael Fakuade	Cafés Candelas Breogán	32	222	6.9
5	(Ukraine) Volodymyr Gerun	Calzados Robusta / FC Barcelona Lassa B	33	221	6.7

=== Assists ===
Rk	Name	Team	Games	Assists	APG
1	(Spain) Dani Pérez	Unión Financiera Baloncesto Oviedo	31	173	5.6
2	(Spain) Óscar Alvarado	Sáenz Horeca Araberri Basket	33	182	5.5
3	(Spain) Ricardo Uriz	RETAbet.es GBC	34	159	4.7
4	(Spain) Joan Faner	TAU Castelló	34	158	4.6
5	(Spain) Xavier Forcada	CB Prat	29	131	4.5

=== Performance Index Rating ===
Rk	Name	Team	Games	Rating	PIR
1	(Spain) Jordi Trias	FC Barcelona Lassa B	34	697	20.5
2	(United States) Zaid Hearst	Sáenz Horeca Araberri Basket	34	675	19.8
3	(Dominican Republic) Dagoberto Peña	Leyma Coruña / FC Barcelona Lassa B	33	619	18.7
4	(Serbia) Goran Huskić	San Pablo Inmobiliaria Burgos	33	608	18.4
5	(Spain) Pep Ortega	CB Prat	33	593	18.0

== Awards ==
=== MVP by week ===
Round	Player	Team	PIR
1	(Serbia) Goran Huskić	San Pablo Inmobiliaria Burgos	40
2	(Spain) Jordi Trias	FC Barcelona Lassa B	31
3	(Spain) Borja Arévalo	TAU Castelló	36
4	(Bosnia and Herzegovina) Nemanja Mitrović	Ourense Provincia Termal	31
5	(United States) Jason Cain	Marín Peixegalego	30
6	(United States) Jason Cain	Marín Peixegalego	29
7	(Ukraine) Volodymyr Gerun	Calzados Robusta	29
8	(Spain) Andrés Miso	Marín Peixegalego	30
9	(Spain) Xabier López-Aróstegui	CB Prat	42
10	(Spain) Fran Guerra	Ourense Provincia Termal	28
10	(United States) Jason Cain	Marín Peixegalego	28
11	(Serbia) Goran Huskić	San Pablo Inmobiliaria Burgos	37
12	(Croatia) Aleksandar Marciuš	Cáceres Patrimonio de la Humanidad	27
13	(United States) Michael Carlson	RETAbet.es GBC	41
14	(Spain) Iván García	Sáenz Horeca Araberri	36
15	(Dominican Republic) Dagoberto Peña	Leyma Coruña	34
16	(Spain) Carles Bivià	Palma Air Europa	29
16	(Spain) Pep Ortega	CB Prat	29
16	(Spain) Urko Otegui	Quesos Cerrato Palencia	29
17	(Spain) Pep Ortega	CB Prat	38
18	(Croatia) Aleksandar Marciuš	Cáceres Patrimonio de la Humanidad	42
19	(United States) Garret Nevels	Actel Força Lleida	34
20	(United States) Zaid Hearst	Sáenz Horeca Araberri	34
21	(Spain) Roger Fornas	Palma Air Europa	38
22	(United States) Paul Jesperson	Unión Financiera Baloncesto Oviedo	29
23	(United States) Zaid Hearst	Sáenz Horeca Araberri	33
24	(Spain) Christian Díaz	Ourense Provincia Termal	32
24	(Spain) Dani Pérez	Unión Financiera Baloncesto Oviedo	32
25	(Spain) Javi Vega	San Pablo Inmobiliaria Burgos	38
26	(Dominican Republic) Dagoberto Peña	FC Barcelona Lassa B	32
27	(United States) Michael Carlson	RETAbet.es GBC	36
28	(Spain) Dani Rodríguez	Quesos Cerrato Palencia	33
29	(United States) Jason Cain	Marín Peixegalego	32
30	(Senegal) Mamadou Samb	Quesos Cerrato Palencia	32
31	(Lithuania) Mindaugas Kupšas	Calzados Robusta	40
32	(Canada) Johnny Berhanemeskel	Sáenz Horeca Araberri	35
33	(Spain) Edu Gatell	Club Melilla Baloncesto	30
34	(United States) Garrett Nevels	Actel Força Lleida	44
QF1	(Bosnia and Herzegovina) Nemanja Mitrović	Ourense Provincia Termal	28
QF2	(Spain) Carles Bivià	Palma Air Europa	33
QF3	(Spain) Dani Rodríguez	Quesos Cerrato Palencia	37
QF4	(Spain) Dani Rodríguez	Quesos Cerrato Palencia	33
QF5	(United States) Thomas Bropleh	Cafés Candelas Breogán	28
SF1	(Serbia) Goran Huskić	San Pablo Inmobiliaria Burgos	30
SF1	(United States) Lamont Barnes	Quesos Cerrato Palencia	30
SF2	(Serbia) Goran Huskić	San Pablo Inmobiliaria Burgos	27
SF3	(Serbia) Goran Huskić	San Pablo Inmobiliaria Burgos	28
SF4	(Spain) Urko Otegui	Quesos Cerrato Palencia	21
F1	(Serbia) Goran Huskić	San Pablo Inmobiliaria Burgos	24
F2	(Serbia) Goran Huskić	San Pablo Inmobiliaria Burgos	31
F3	(Spain) Edu Martínez	San Pablo Inmobiliaria Burgos	23
