= Mouhamed Barro =

Senegalese basketball player (born 1995)

No. 24 – CSO Voluntari
- Position: Power forward / center
- League: Liga Națională

Personal information
- Born: May 10, 1995 (age 31) Pikine, Senegal
- Listed height: 6 ft 8 in (2.03 m)
- Listed weight: 230 lb (104 kg)

Career information
- NBA draft: 2012: undrafted
- Playing career: 2013–present

Career history
- 2012–2013: UB La Palma
- 2013–2016: Gran Canaria
- 2016–2018: Oviedo
- 2018–2019: Gipuzkoa
- 2019–2020: Lille Métropole
- 2020–2021: Básquet Coruña
- 2021: FC Porto
- 2021–2022: Melilla
- 2022: Gaiteros del Zulia
- 2022–2024: CSU Sibiu
- 2024–2025: Trepça
- 2025: Baskets Oldenburg
- 2025–Present: CSO Voluntari

Career highlights
- Kosovo Supercup winner (2024); Copa Princesa de Asturias winner (2017)

Mouhamed Barro (born May 10, 1995) is a Senegalese professional basketball player for CSO Voluntari of the Liga Națională.

== Professional career ==
=== Lille Métropole (2019–2020) ===
Barro signed for the French club Lille Métropole of the LNB Pro B on the 13 August 2019.

=== CSU Sibiu (2022–2024) ===
Barro was part of the Romanian club CSU Sibiu for two seasons.

=== Trepça (2024–2025) ===
On August 11, 2024, Barro signed for the Kosovan club Trepça of the Superleague and Liga Unike.

=== Baskets Oldenburg (2025) ===
On February 1, 2025, he signed for EWE Baskets Oldenburg of the German Basketball Bundesliga (BBL).

=== Voluntari (2025–present) ===
On August 6, 2025, he signed with CSO Voluntari of the Liga Națională.
