= Manu Rodríguez (basketball) =

Spanish basketball player

No. 11 – Palencia Baloncesto
- Position: Shooting guard
- League: Primera FEB

Personal information
- Born: 17 August 1991 (age 35) Granada, Spain
- Listed height: 1.92 m (6 ft 4 in)
- Listed weight: 82 kg (181 lb)

Career information
- Playing career: 2008–present

Career history
- 2008–2012: Granada
- 2012–2013: CEBA Guadalajara
- 2013–2016: Amics Castelló
- 2016–2017: Oviedo
- 2017–2021: Fundación Granada
- 2021–2022: Cáceres
- 2022–present: Palencia

Manuel Rodríguez Barrientos (born 17 August 1991) is a Spanish professional basketball player for Palencia of the Spanish Primera FEB.

== Career ==
Rodríguez started playing professionally at hometown CB Granada. After the club was dissolved in 2012, he joined CEBA Guadalajara of the LEB Plata. One season later, Rodríguez moved to Amics Castelló, where he spent three years, achieving in 2015 the Copa LEB Plata and promoting to LEB Oro.

In July 2016, Rodríguez moved to Oviedo CB, where he helped the team to win the Copa Princesa de Asturias.

One year later, Rodríguez came back to Granada, this time to Fundación CB Granada in LEB Plata. After a season with Cáceres, Rodríguez joined Palencia Baloncesto in August 2022.

== Honours ==
- Oviedo CB
  - Copa Princesa de Asturias (1): 2017
- AB Castelló
  - Copa LEB Plata (1): 2015
