= Felipe dos Anjos =

Brazilian basketball player

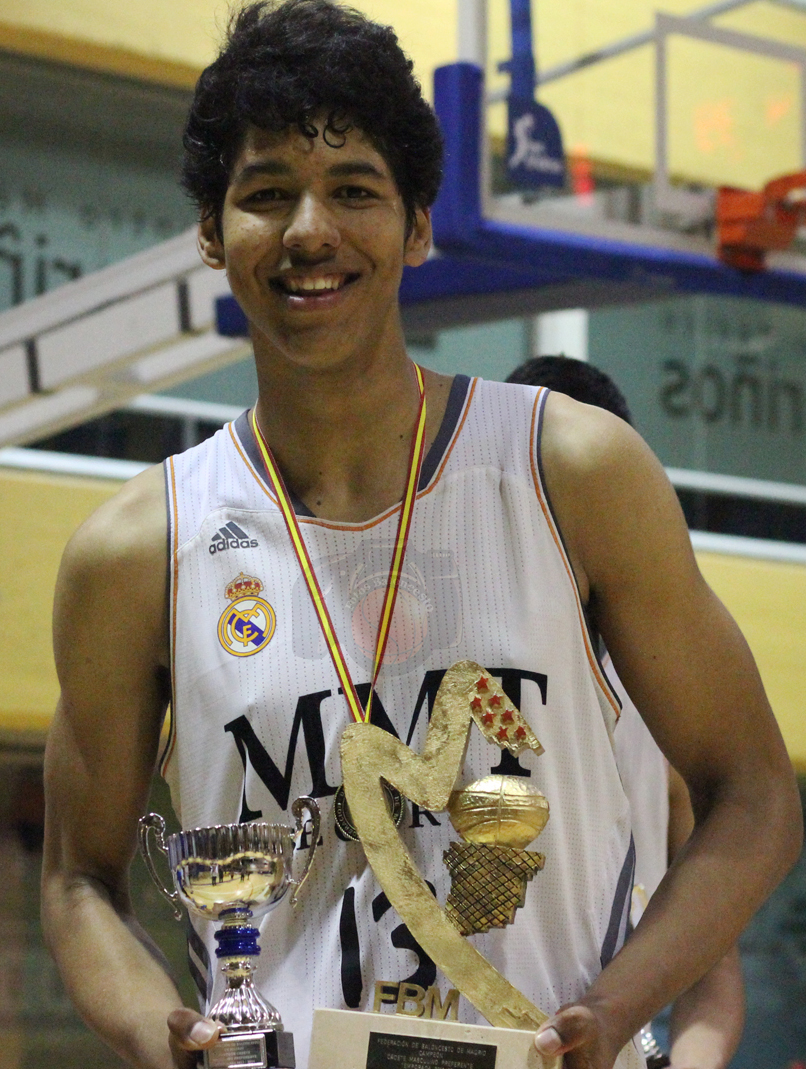
- Dos Anjos with Real Madrid B in 2014

No. 7 – Monbus Obradoiro
- Position: Center
- League: Primera FEB

Personal information
- Born: April 30, 1998 (age 28) São Paulo, Brazil
- Listed height: 7 ft 3 in (2.21 m)
- Listed weight: 251 lb (114 kg)

Career information
- Playing career: 2016–present

Career history
- 2016: Real Madrid
- 2016–2017: → Oviedo
- 2017–2018: → Burgos
- 2018–2019: → Melilla
- 2019–2020: Palencia Baloncesto
- 2020–2021: Bilbao Basket
- 2021–2022: Estudiantes
- 2022–2025: Andorra
- 2025–present: Monbus Obradoiro

Felipe dos Anjos de Paula Gama (born April 30, 1998) is a Brazilian professional basketball player for Monbus Obradoiro of Primera FEB. He is a 2.21 m (7 ft 3 in) tall center.

== Early career ==
Dos Anjos came through the youth ranks of Esporte Clube Pinheiros, in his native Brazil. In 2012, dos Anjos moved to Spain, joining the youth clubs of Real Madrid. He played in the amateur level, on the club's reserve team, in the Spanish EBA League, which is Spain's 4th Division, during the 2014–15 and 2015–16 campaigns.

He helped Real's under-18 team win the Adidas Next Generation Tournament, in 2015. In January 2016, he was named the most valuable player of the Adidas Next Generation Tournament qualifiers, in L'Hospitalet. The next month, he attended the Basketball Without Borders Global Camp, in Toronto.

In April 2017, he participated in the Nike Hoop Summit. Coming off the bench for the World Select Team, dos Anjos remained scoreless in eight minutes of play.

== Professional career ==
For the 2016–17 season, dos Anjos was sent on loan to Union Financiera Baloncesto Oviedo of the second Spanish division, LEB Oro, where he averaged 8.4 points and 6.0 rebounds per game.

On 15 August 2017, Real Madrid loaned him to San Pablo Burgos, for the 2017–18 season, where he made his debut in the Spanish top division, Liga ACB.

On 22 July 2020, dos Anjos signed with RETAbet Bilbao Basket.

On 9 August 2021, dos Anjos signed with Movistar Estudiantes.

On July 31, 2025, he signed with Monbus Obradoiro of Primera FEB.

== National team career ==
Dos Anjos made his debut for the Brazil national team in the 2023 FIBA Basketball World Cup.
