= Walk-on (sports) =

College team member without a scholarship

In American and Canadian college athletics, a walk-on is someone who becomes part of a college team without being recruited or awarded an athletic scholarship. Walk-on players are generally viewed as less significant compared to the scholarship players, and may not even be placed on an official depth chart or traveling team. However, a walk-on player occasionally becomes a noted member of the team.

== General parameters ==
- Because of scholarship limits instituted by the National Collegiate Athletic Association (NCAA), many football teams do not offer scholarships to their punters, long snappers and placekickers until they have become established producers.
- Sometimes injury or outside issues can make unavailable several players of one position, resulting in the elevation of a walk-on to a featured player.
- In other situations, a walk-on may so impress the coaching staff with their play on the scout team and in practice that they are rewarded with a scholarship and made a part of the regular depth chart. Often, it is the players who achieve success in this manner that are the inspiration for future walk-ons. One significant college football national award, the Burlsworth Trophy—named after former walk-on Arkansas Razorbacks guard Brandon Burlsworth who earned second-team All-American in 1998—has been awarded since the 2010 season to the most outstanding player in the top-level Football Bowl Subdivision (FBS) who began his college career as a walk-on. The only two-time recipient of the Burlsworth Trophy, Oklahoma Sooners quarterback Baker Mayfield (2015 and 2016), won the 2017 Heisman Trophy. He began his college career as a walk-on for the Texas Tech Red Raiders before transferring to Oklahoma, where he received all of the aforementioned awards, and eventually was selected with the first overall pick of the 2018 NFL draft by the Cleveland Browns.
- Also, there are times where a walk-on will be a dependable member of the team's practice and scout teams for several years. If a team has an extra scholarship, it may award it to the player as a token of appreciation for their hard work and devotion to the team, although the player may never actually play in a game.
- Finally, in rare cases, an established scholarship player may give up their scholarship and become a walk-on in order to open up the scholarship spot for another player. Three such cases in men's college basketball have received notoriety in recent years:
  - In the 2011–12 season, three Louisville Cardinals scholarship players, most notably Kyle Kuric and Chris Smith, became walk-ons to bring the Cardinals scholarship totals down to the NCAA limit of 13.
  - In 2013–14, the Creighton Bluejays forward Doug McDermott became a walk-on after teammate Grant Gibbs was granted a rare sixth year of eligibility by the NCAA, putting the Bluejays over the 13-scholarship limit.
  - In 2014–15, the Xavier Musketeers starting center Matt Stainbrook enrolled in the school's Master of Business Administration (MBA) program and gave up his scholarship for his younger brother Tim, who had been a walk-on at Xavier the year before, in order to save their family a five-figure amount in school expenses. This led him to become a driver for the on-demand car service Uber, which gained him significant notoriety during that season.

== Purpose ==
The reasons athletes choose to pursue the path of a walk-on include:

- The athlete wishes to join one particular team that is not athletically interested in them. The target team may not have been impressed by the athlete, or it may already be saturated at the athlete's position. The athlete applies for the school the normal way and joins the team as a walk-on to try to win the coaches over. The athlete may have chosen this team for reasons of prestige, for the school's academic qualities, or to carry on a family tradition of attending a particular school.
- The athlete has not been noticed or taken seriously by recruiters. This can be the result of either not playing the respective sport while in high school or, more commonly, the athlete played the sport in high school, and perhaps even at an exceptional level, but the level of competition around them was subpar and led scouts to dismiss the player's ability to adapt to the college game (this is often the case in rural districts where the local public school is often the only option for high school other than homeschooling). In this case, the same drawbacks that prevent the athlete from receiving the athletic scholarship may also prevent the student from even gaining admission to higher-level colleges.
- A "preferred walk-on" is a prospect whom coaches guarantee a spot on the team, but are unwilling or unable to give a scholarship to. This is particularly prevalent with punters and kickers in college football.

== In collegiate sports ==
Many schools that do not provide athletic scholarships still recruit student athletes, and these students can get admitted to a school with academic records that are below average for that school. The Ivy League, for example, does not permit athletic scholarships, but each school has a limited number of athletes it can recruit for each sport. Additionally, all prospective athletes are required to meet a minimum score on what the league calls the Academic Index (AI), a metric based largely on high school grade-point averages and SAT or ACT scores. The goal of the AI is to ensure that students who receive athletic admissions slots fall within one standard deviation of the credentials of the student body as a whole.

Division III athletes cannot receive athletic scholarships, but frequently get an easier ride through admissions. Even though these students do not receive athletic scholarships and are not required to play to remain in school, they are not walk-ons, because they were recruited. Instead of being awarded an athletic scholarship, they were granted an athletic admissions slot to a school to which they ordinarily would not have been likely to have gained admission.
