= Matt Stainbrook =

American basketball player (born 1992)

TAU Castelló
- Position: Center
- League: LEB Oro

Personal information
- Born: March 5, 1992 (age 34) Dayton, Ohio, U.S.
- Listed height: 6 ft 10 in (2.08 m)
- Listed weight: 270 lb (122 kg)

Career information
- High school: St. Edward (Lakewood, Ohio)
- College: Western Michigan (2010–2012); Xavier (2013–2015)
- NBA draft: 2015: undrafted
- Playing career: 2015–present

Career history
- 2015–2016: Crailsheim Merlins
- 2016–2018: Breogán
- 2018–2019: Real Betis
- 2019–2020: Palma
- 2020–2021: TAU Castelló
- 2022: Astros de Jalisco

Career highlights
- CIBACOPA champion (2022); LEB Oro champion (2018); Second-team All-Big East (2015)

Matthew Harrison Stainbrook (born March 5, 1992) is an American basketball player for TAU Castelló of the LEB Oro. He played college basketball for the Xavier Musketeers and Western Michigan Broncos. During his two seasons of play at Xavier, Stainbrook was one of Xavier's leading scorers and rebounders.

== Early life ==
Stainbrook is the son of Dave Stainbrook, who was a standout 6'7" football player (tight end and offensive tackle) at Ohio University in the early 1980s and also a software engineer in the aerospace industry who once worked for NASA. Matt Stainbrook grew up in suburban Cleveland. In a 2015 interview with New York Times reporter John Branch, he admitted to having been a "nobody" in high school; he did not start for his high school varsity team until his senior year. He initially planned to play at local Division III school Case Western Reserve University until receiving a Division I offer from Western Michigan University.

== College career ==
Despite being almost completely ignored out of high school, Stainbrook earned the starting center position as a freshman at Western Michigan. In his first game, against Xavier, he had 10 points and 7 rebounds in a 68–65 loss. According to Branch, Musketeers coach Chris Mack "wondered how the center—with his crazy hair, pads on his knees and elbows, and goggles on his face—had gone unnoticed in recruiting."

Ultimately, Stainbrook would transfer to Xavier after his sophomore season. Mack had some conditions before accepting him—he would have to cut his hair, stop wearing knee and elbow pads and lose 50 pounds (23 kg). Mack also wanted to remove Stainbrook's goggles, but relented when Stainbrook told him they were prescription goggles that he needed in order to see well enough to play.

He went on to earn second-team All-Big East honors in his final college season of 2014–15, and was also one of the 10 finalists for that season's Senior CLASS Award. He averaged just under 12 points and 7 rebounds per game in leading Xavier to the Sweet 16. Following the season Stainbrook joined the Xavier track and field team as a discus thrower and shot putter, and competed at the Big East Track & Field Outdoor Championship at Villanova University.

== Professional career ==
Stainbrook signed his first professional contract with the Crailsheim Merlins in the German Bundesliga on August 28, 2015.

In July 2015, Stainbrook played with the Indiana Pacers in the Orlando NBA Summer League and the Golden State Warriors in the Las Vegas NBA Summer League.

One year later, he moved to Spain to play with LEB Oro team Cafés Candelas Breogán. In his second season, CB Breogán won the league title and was promoted to the top tier. On August 3, 2018, Stainbrook signed a two-year deal with Real Betis Energía Plus of the LEB Oro. On June 18, 2019, Stainbrook signed with Iberojet Palma of the LEB Oro after achieving two consecutive promotions to the Liga Endesa, being a fundamental piece in both teams. He averaged 3.9 points, 3.6 rebounds and 1.0 assist per game. On July 12, 2020, Stainbrook signed with TAU Castelló.

== Personal ==
Stainbrook is the son of Nancy Stainbrook, and has two brothers. His father Dave played football for Ohio University from 1980 to 1985. Matt's older brother Andy is 6 ft 9 in (2.06 m) and briefly attended the United States Air Force Academy, and younger brother Tim is 6 ft 6 in (1.98 m), attended Xavier, and played a major role in an episode that brought Matt a significant amount of national notoriety.

=== Driving for Uber ===
During his senior season in 2014–15, Stainbrook not only made news for his on-court play, but also for his part-time job as a driver for Uber. His journey to that job began the previous season when Tim walked on to the Xavier basketball team at Matt's suggestion. Matt completed a bachelor's degree in finance in May 2014 but still had a year of athletic eligibility remaining, and enrolled in the school's MBA program. Tim's undergraduate tuition was about $43,000 per year, while Matt's graduate tuition was roughly $14,000. Even though Tim was receiving a partial academic scholarship, the family would have paid considerably more in education expenses if Matt were on scholarship while Tim was a walk-on. This led Matt to go to Xavier's director of basketball operations and NCAA compliance director and give up his scholarship for his brother.

Because he was now a walk-on, he was no longer bound by many restrictions that the NCAA places on student-athletes, most significantly those dealing with off-campus employment. In addition, he had wanted to live off campus, especially in his final season, but Xavier athletic department policy generally requires scholarship athletes to live in university housing; being a walk-on enabled him to fulfill this desire. While student loans paid for most of his direct academic expenses, he still had many other expenses to meet, and a schedule that made most normal jobs impractical. Having used Uber himself while at Xavier, he researched the requirements for becoming a driver for the company. He met all the requirements, with his 2004 Buick Rendezvous barely meeting the 10-year cutoff for eligible vehicles, and was accepted as a driver. During the basketball offseason, he drove for Uber anywhere from 25 to 30 hours per week, dropping his hours to 10 to 20 per week during basketball season. According to Stainbrook, "It [driving] sort of relaxes you. You get to talk to people who don’t always want to talk basketball all the time, so it’s a change of pace." He mainly drove in the area of the Xavier campus, and he estimated that about half the people he picked up recognized him, at least by his face and size.
