= 2007 ACB Playoffs =

Spanish basketball league play-offs

Quarter Finals
1 | TAU Cerámica | 3
8 | Unicaja Málaga | 0
4 | Winterthur FCB | 3
5 | Akasvayu Girona | 1
2 | Real Madrid | 3
7 | Pamesa Valencia | 1
3 | DKV Joventut | 3
6 | Gran Canaria Grupo Dunas | 2

SemiFinals
1 | TAU Cerámica | 2
4 | Winterthur FCB | 3
2 | Real Madrid | 3
3 | DKV Joventut | 2

Finals
4 | Winterthur FCB | 1
2 | Real Madrid | 3

== Playoff seedings, results, and schedules ==
=== Quarter-finals ===
(1) TAU Cerámica (26-8) vs. (8) Unicaja Málaga (17-17)
TAU Cerámica win the series 3-0

- Game 1 18 May @ Vitoria-Gasteiz: TAU Cerámica 92, Unicaja Málaga 65
- Game 2 20 May @ Málaga: Unicaja Málaga 66, TAU Cerámica 82
- Game 3 25 May @ Vitoria-Gasteiz: TAU Cerámica 88, Unicaja Málaga 63

(4) Winterthur FCB (23-11) vs. (5) Akasvayu Girona (21-13)
Winterthur FCB win the series 3-1

- Game 1 18 May @ Barcelona: Winterthur FCB 80, Akasvayu Girona 69
- Game 2 20 May @ Girona: Akasvayu Girona 85, Winterthur FCB 70
- Game 3 25 May @ Barcelona: Winterthur FCB 84, Akasvayu Girona 77
- Game 4 27 May @ Girona:Akasvayu Girona 75, Winterthur FCB 90

(2) Real Madrid (25-9) vs. (7) Pamesa Valencia (19-15)
Real Madrid win the series 3-1

- Game 1 17 May @ Madrid: Real Madrid 84, Pamesa Valencia 81
- Game 2 19 May @ Valencia: Pamesa Valencia 70, Real Madrid 67
- Game 3 24 May @ Madrid: Real Madrid 100, Pamesa Valencia 79
- Game 4 26 May @ Valencia: Pamesa Valencia 80, Real Madrid 83

(3) DKV Joventut (23-11) vs. (6) Gran Canaria Grupo Dunas (21-13)
DKV Joventut win the series 3-2

- Game 1 18 May @ Badalona: DKV Joventut 75, Gran Canaria Grupo Dunas 73
- Game 2 20 May @ Las Palmas de Gran Canaria: Gran Canaria Grupo Dunas 71, DKV Joventut 80
- Game 3 25 May @ Badalona: DKV Joventut 63, Gran Canaria Grupo Dunas 74
- Game 4 27 May @ Las Palmas de Gran Canaria: Gran Canaria Grupo Dunas 74, Joventut 71
- Game 5 29 May @ Badalona: DKV Joventut 93, Gran Canaria Grupo Dunas 76

=== Semifinals ===
- These four teams classified for the semifinals will play the Euroleague for the 2007/2008 season.
- The other best two teams are classified for the ULEB Cup.

(1) TAU Cerámica (26-8) vs. (4) Winterthur FCB (23-11)
Winterthur FCB win the series 3-2

- Game 1 1 June @ Vitoria-Gasteiz: TAU Cerámica 81, Winterthur FCB 73
- Game 2 3 June @ Vitoria-Gasteiz: TAU Cerámica 76, Winterthur FCB 83
- Game 3 8 June @ Barcelona: Winterthur FCB 80, TAU Cerámica 78
- Game 4 10 June @ Barcelona: Winterthur FCB 71, TAU Cerámica 77
- Game 5 12 June @ Vitoria-Gasteiz: TAU Cerámica 79, Winterthur FCB 95

(2) Real Madrid (25-9) vs. (3) DKV Joventut (23-11)
Real Madrid win the series 3-2

- Game 1 31 May @ Madrid: Real Madrid 72, DKV Joventut 70
- Game 2 3 June @ Madrid: Real Madrid 69, DKV Joventut 76
- Game 3 7 June @ Badalona:DKV Joventut 85, Real Madrid 71
- Game 4 10 June @ Badalona: DKV Joventut 70, Real Madrid 72
- Game 5 12 June @ Madrid: Real Madrid 65, DKV Joventut 61

=== ACB Finals ===
(2) Real Madrid (25-9) vs. (4) Winterthur FCB (23-11)
Real Madrid win the series 3-1 and the championship

- Game 1 June 17 @ Madrid: Real Madrid 69, Winterthur FCB 62
- Game 2 June 19 @ Madrid: Real Madrid 83, Winterthur FCB 80
- Game 3 June 22 @ Barcelona: Winterthur FCB 75, Real Madrid 70
- Game 4 June 24 @ Barcelona: Winterthur FCB 71, Real Madrid 83

REAL MADRID BALONCESTO: 2006/2007 ACB CHAMPION

==== MVP ====
- (Spain) Felipe Reyes – Real Madrid

=== TV coverage ===
- TVE2
- Teledeporte
- FORTA
