= Miquel Salvó =

Spanish basketball player (born 1994)

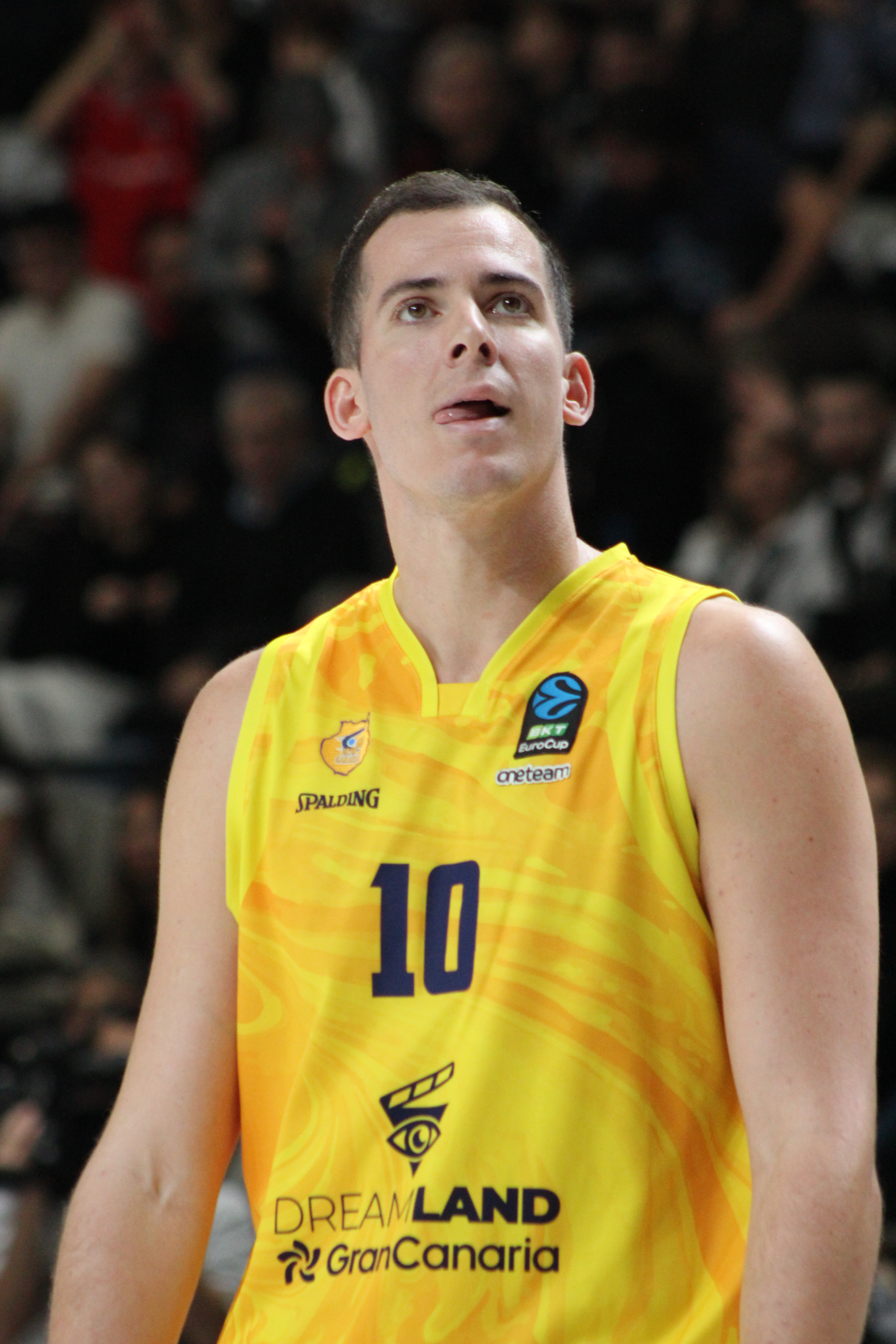
- Salvó with CB Gran Canaria in 2024

No. 10 – CB Gran Canaria
- Position: Small forward
- League: Primera FEB

Personal information
- Born: November 3, 1994 (age 32) Vilanova i la Geltrú, Spain
- Listed height: 2.05 m (6 ft 9 in)
- Listed weight: 100 kg (220 lb)

Career information
- Playing career: 2011–present

Career history
- 2011–2013: CB Samà
- 2013–2014: Spirou Charleroi
- 2013–2014: →Essor Charleroi
- 2014–2015: Cornellà
- 2015–2016: Tarragona
- 2016–2017: Oviedo
- 2017–2019: Gipuzkoa
- 2019–2021: San Pablo Burgos
- 2021–present: Gran Canaria

Career highlights
- EuroCup champion (2023); 2× FIBA Champions League champion (2020, 2021); FIBA Intercontinental Cup champion (2021)

Miquel Salvó Llambrich (born November 3, 1994) is a Spanish professional basketball player who plays for CB Gran Canaria of the Spanish Primera FEB. Standing at 6 ft 9 in (2.05 m), Salvó plays as a small forward.

== Early life and youth career ==
Born in Vilanova i la Geltrú, Catalonia, Salvó started playing basketball for local club CB Samà. He later joined the youth ranks of FC Barcelona in 2006. After leaving the FC Barcelona academy in 2010, he returned to CB Samà, playing his first seasons of senior basketball in regional leagues organized by the Catalan Basketball Federation.

== Professional career ==
In 2013, Salvó joined Essor Charleroi, the reserve team of Spirou Charleroi in the Belgian second division. While mostly playing for the reserve team, Salvó made his debut for Spirou.

In 2014, Salvó returned to Catalonia and signed for CB Cornellà, then playing in the Liga EBA. In 2015, he joined LEB Plata club CB Tarragona. His good performances with Tarragona attracted the attention of Liga ACB clubs such as Bàsquet Manresa, which offered Salvó the opportunity to train with the team and a contract for the 2017-18 season. In June 2016, he signed for LEB Oro club Oviedo CB for the 2016-17 season. With Oviedo, Salvó won the 2017 Copa Princesa de Asturias and was named the tournament's MVP. He also took part in the 2017 playoffs.

Despite having a previous agreement with Bàsquet Manresa, as the Bages-based team was relegated to the LEB Oro after the 2016-17 ACB season, Salvó was free to sign with other teams. In the summer of 2017, he signed a 4 year contract with recently promoted Liga ACB team Gipuzkoa Basket. Finally making his debut in the top tier of Spanish basketball, he spent two seasons with Guipzkoa in the Liga ACB.

=== San Pablo Burgos (2019–2021) ===
Salvó signed with San Pablo Burgos of the Liga ACB in July 2019. With Burgos, Salvó won the Basketball Champions League twice in a row (2020, 2021) and also won the 2021 FIBA Intercontinental Cup.

=== Gran Canaria (2021–present) ===
In July 2021, Salvó signed a two year contract with CB Gran Canaria of the Liga ACB. Becoming an important player with Gran Canaria, he extended his contract for two more years in June 2023. Salvó won the 2022–23 EuroCup with the Canarians, reaching the final once again in 2025 but losing to Hapoel Tel Aviv.

In February 2026, Salvó was injured during a Liga ACB game against Coviran Granada. He would later be diagnosed with a patellar tendon rupture, which would sideline him for an extended period of time. On February 28, 2026, Salvó signed a contract extension for two more seasons with Gran Canaria through 2028.

== National team career ==
Salvó has represented the Spanish national team internationally, making his debut in a game against Poland in the EuroBasket 2022 qualifiers.

Costa has also represented the Catalan national team.

== Career statistics ==
Legend
GP	Games played	GS	Games started	MPG	Minutes per game
FG%	Field-goal percentage	3P%	3-point field-goal percentage	FT%	Free-throw percentage
RPG	Rebounds per game	APG	Assists per game	SPG	Steals per game
BPG	Blocks per game	PPG	Points per game	PIR	Performance index rating
**Bold**	Career high

=== EuroCup ===
Year	Team	GP	GS	MPG	FG%	3P%	FT%	RPG	APG	SPG	BPG	PPG	PIR
2021–22	Gran Canaria	20	10	19.3	.564	.472	.647	3.8	1.6	.8	–	7.2	9.1
2022–23	Gran Canaria	22	3	18.5	.480	.186	.821	2.9	1.5	.5	.1	6.3	7.2
2023–24	Gran Canaria	19	3	17.2	.552	.389	.703	3.2	1.4	.4	.1	7.2	9.0
2024–25	Gran Canaria	25	2	14.2	.487	.324	.818	2.4	1.0	.5	.1	4.9	7.0
Career		86	18	17.2	.524	.336	.753	3.0	1.4	.5	.1	6.3	8.0

=== Domestic leagues ===
==== Regular season ====
Year	Team	League	GP	MPG	FG%	3P%	FT%	RPG	APG	SPG	BPG	PPG
2017–18	(Spain) Gipuzkoa	ACB	34	17.7	.444	.286	.525	3.2	1.1	.5	.1	4.3
2018–19	(Spain) Gipuzkoa	ACB	32	16.8	.440	.206	.719	3.5	.6	.5	.2	5.6
2019–20	(Spain) San Pablo Burgos	ACB	18	12.2	.436	.214	.600	2.7	.2	.2	.3	2.6
2020–21	(Spain) San Pablo Burgos	ACB	35	14.5	.455	.328	.774	2.2	.3	.5	.1	1.7
2021–22	(Spain) Gran Canaria	ACB	34	18.1	.450	.313	.695	3.3	.8	.6	.1	5.1
2022–23	(Spain) Gran Canaria	ACB	34	16.4	.503	.292	.703	3.1	.6	.6	.3	7.1
2023–24	(Spain) Gran Canaria	ACB	34	16.1	.442	.349	.712	3.2	.9	.3	.1	5.1
2024–25	(Spain) Gran Canaria	ACB	34	13.6	.464	.293	.817	1.9	.7	.3	.1	4.9
