= Dagoberto Peña =

Dominican basketball player

No. 0 – CD Estela
- Position: Small forward
- League: Liga Española de Baloncesto

Personal information
- Born: June 14, 1988 (age 38) Santo Domingo, Dominican Republic
- Listed height: 6 ft 6 in (1.98 m)
- Listed weight: 220 lb (100 kg)

Career information
- High school: Charlotte (Punta Gorda, Florida)
- College: Marshall (2008–2012)
- NBA draft: 2012: undrafted
- Playing career: 2013–2024

Career history
- 2014–2015: Centro Juventud Sionista
- 2015–2016: Básquet Coruña
- 2016: Metros de Santiago
- 2016: FC Barcelona Bàsquet B
- 2017: Básquet Coruña
- 2017–2018: CB Estudiantes
- 2018–2019: BC Pieno žvaigždės
- 2019–2020: CB Breogán
- 2020–2021: Básquet Coruña
- 2021–2022: Aix Maurienne Savoie
- 2022–2024: CD Estela
- 2023-present: Coach for Charlotte County, Florida

Dagoberto Miguel Peña Rincon (born 14 June 1988) is a Dominican professional basketball player. He plays for the Dominican national basketball team and CD Estela.

== High school ==
Peña was a promising baseball pitcher with a 90-mph fastball before switching to basketball. He left the Dominican Republic to attend a prep school in Florida before switching to Charlotte High School. In his senior year, he averaged 20 points, 10 rebounds and 2 assists.

== College career ==
Peña played college basketball for the Marshall Thundering Herd men's basketball team, in his freshman year, he averaged 4.7 points, 2.0 rebounds and 0.8 assist. In his sophomore year, he averaged 7.3 points, 2.9 rebounds and 1.8 assists. In his Junior year, he averaged 7.2 points, 2.9 rebounds and 1.1 assists. In his senior year, he averaged 6 points, 1.5 rebounds and 0.9 assist.

== Professional career ==
Peña played for the Argentine side Centro Juventud Sionista in the 2014–15 season, he averaged 13.3 points, 1.8 rebounds and 1 assist. He moved to the Spanish side Básquet Coruña in the LEB ORO, he averaged 9 points, 2.2 rebounds and 0.8 assist. He played in the 2016 FIBA Americas League for Metros de Santiago, he averaged 3 points, 0.7 rebound and 0.3 assist. In the 2016–17 season, he moved to the FC Barcelona Bàsquet B, where averaged 17.5 points, 4.1 rebounds and 2.3 assists. In the same season, he moved back to Básquet Coruña, he averaged 16 points, 4.1 rebounds and 2.5 assist. He moved to CB Estudiantes in the 2017–18 season, he averaged 4 points, 1 rebound and 0.8 assist. He played for CB Estudiantes in the 2017–18 Basketball Champions League, he averaged 2.2 points, 1.7 rebounds and 0.9 assists. In the 2018–19 season, he moved to the Lithuania side BC Pieno žvaigždės, where he averaged 10 points, 3.2 rebounds and 2.2 assists. he moved back to CB Estudiantes in the same season and he averaged 4 points. He also played for CB Estudiantes in the 2018–19 Basketball Champions League, he averaged 2 points, 3.5 rebounds and 1.5 assists. He moved to the CB Breogán in the 2019–20 season.

== National team career ==
Peña represented the Dominican Republic national basketball team at the 2015 Marchand Continental Championship Cup in Puerto Rico, he averaged 4 points, 3 rebounds and 0.5 assist. He also played in the 2016 Centrobasket, where he averaged 1 point, 0.6 rebound and 0.2 assist. He participated in the 2017 FIBA AmeriCup, he averaged 2.7 points, 0.7 rebound and 0.7 assist. He played in the 2019 FIBA Basketball World Cup in China, where he averaged 1.6 points, 0.2 rebound and 0.6 assist.
