= Villamuriel de Cerrato =

Coordinates: 41°57′N 4°31′W

- municipality
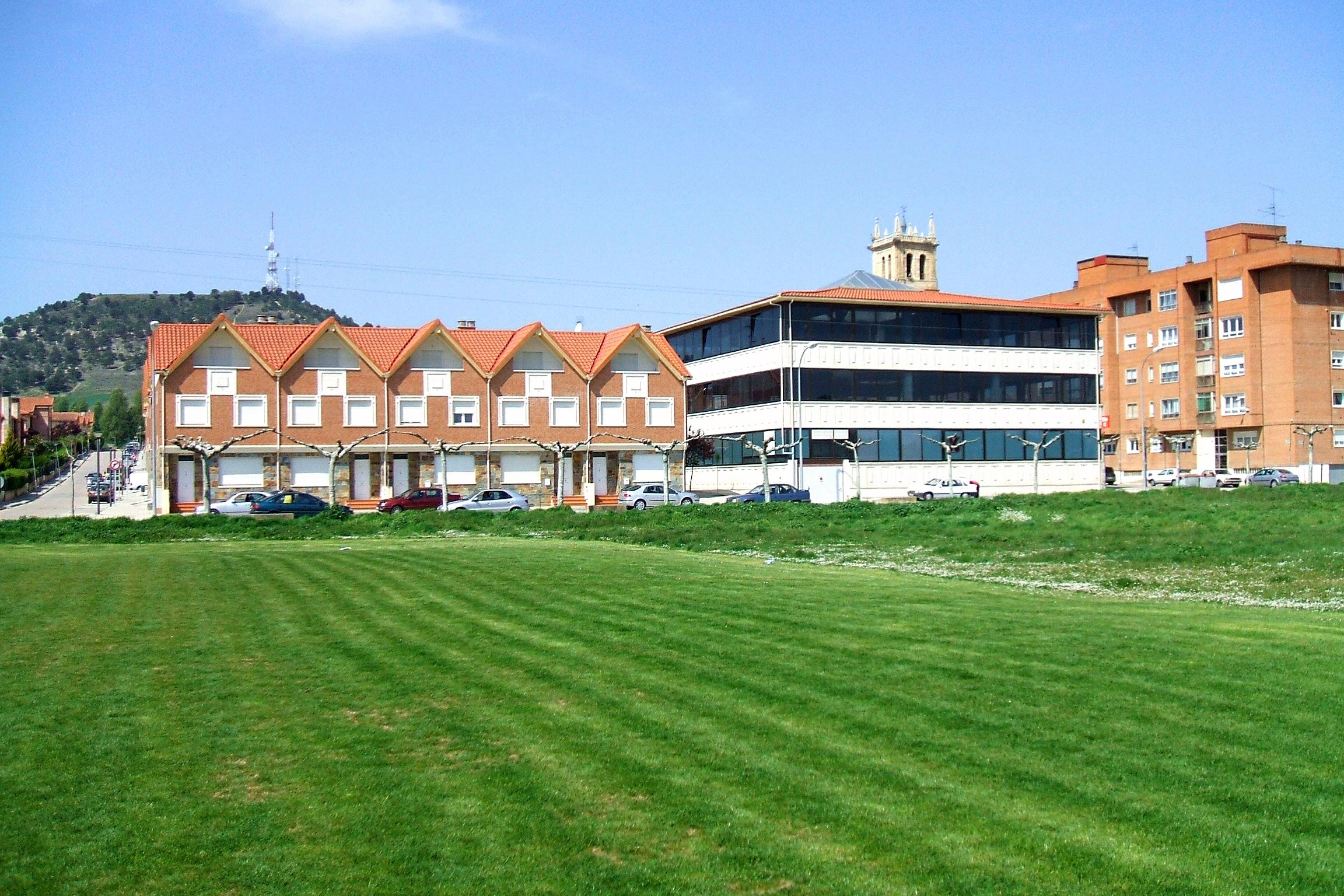

- Flag Coat of arms
- Interactive map of Villamuriel de Cerrato
- Country: Spain
- Autonomous community: Castile and León
- Province: Palencia
- Municipality: Villamuriel de Cerrato

Area
  - Total: 40.02 km^{2} (15.45 sq mi)
- Elevation: 727 m (2,385 ft)

Population (2025-01-01)
  - Total: 6,501
  - Density: 162.4/km^{2} (420.7/sq mi)
- Time zone: UTC+1 (CET)
  - Summer (DST): UTC+2 (CEST)
- Website: Official website

Villamuriel de Cerrato is a municipality located in the province of Palencia, Castile and León, Spain. According to the 2024 census (INE), the municipality had a population of 6,502 inhabitants. Every year on May 1st, there is a pilgrimage from Palencia to Villamuriel de Cerrato to honor María Auxiliadora.

Fr Adolfo Nicolás, Superior General of the Society of Jesus (2008-2016), was born in Villamuriel de Cerrato in 1936.

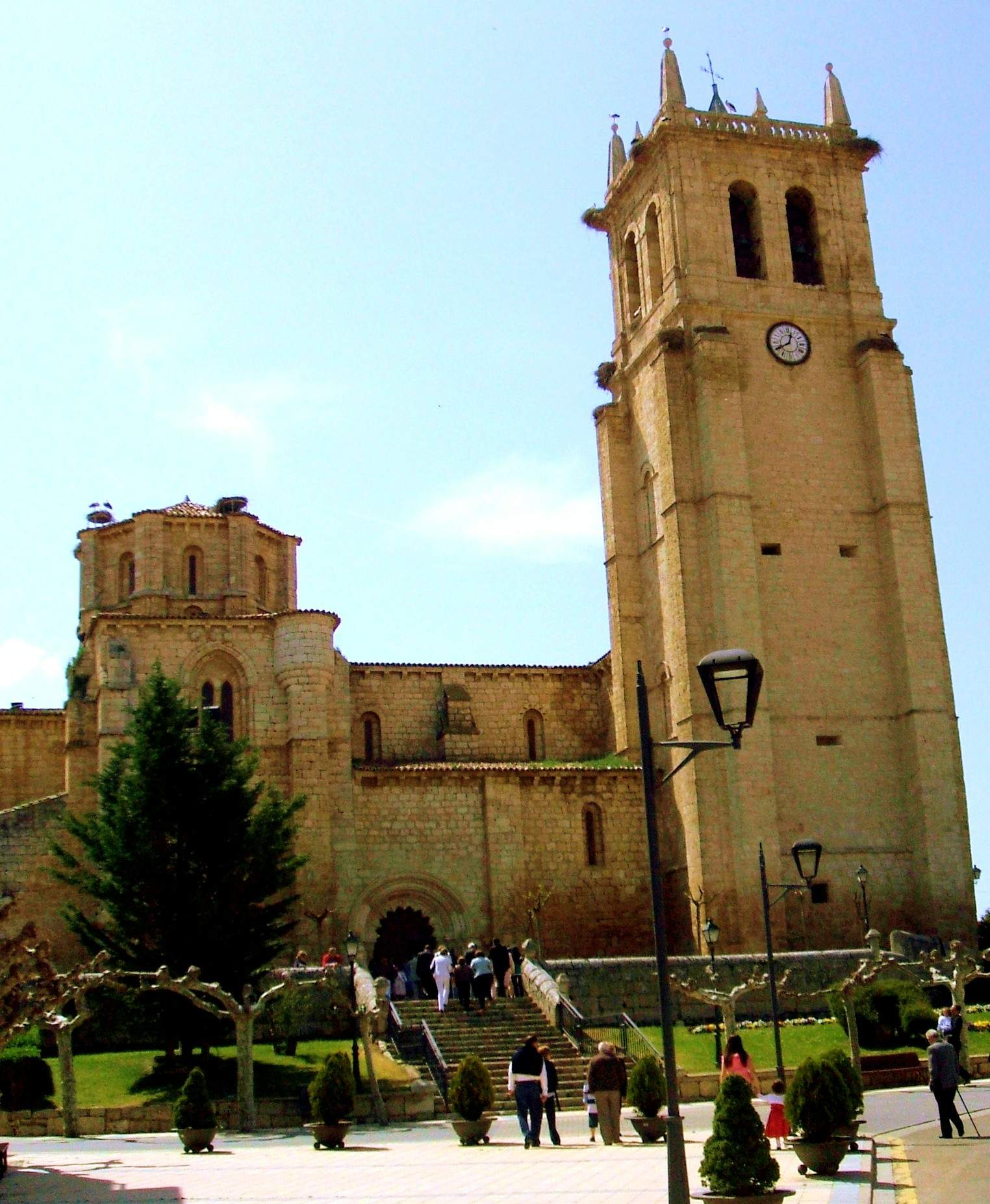
Santa María la Mayor church's tower, Villamuriel de Cerrato

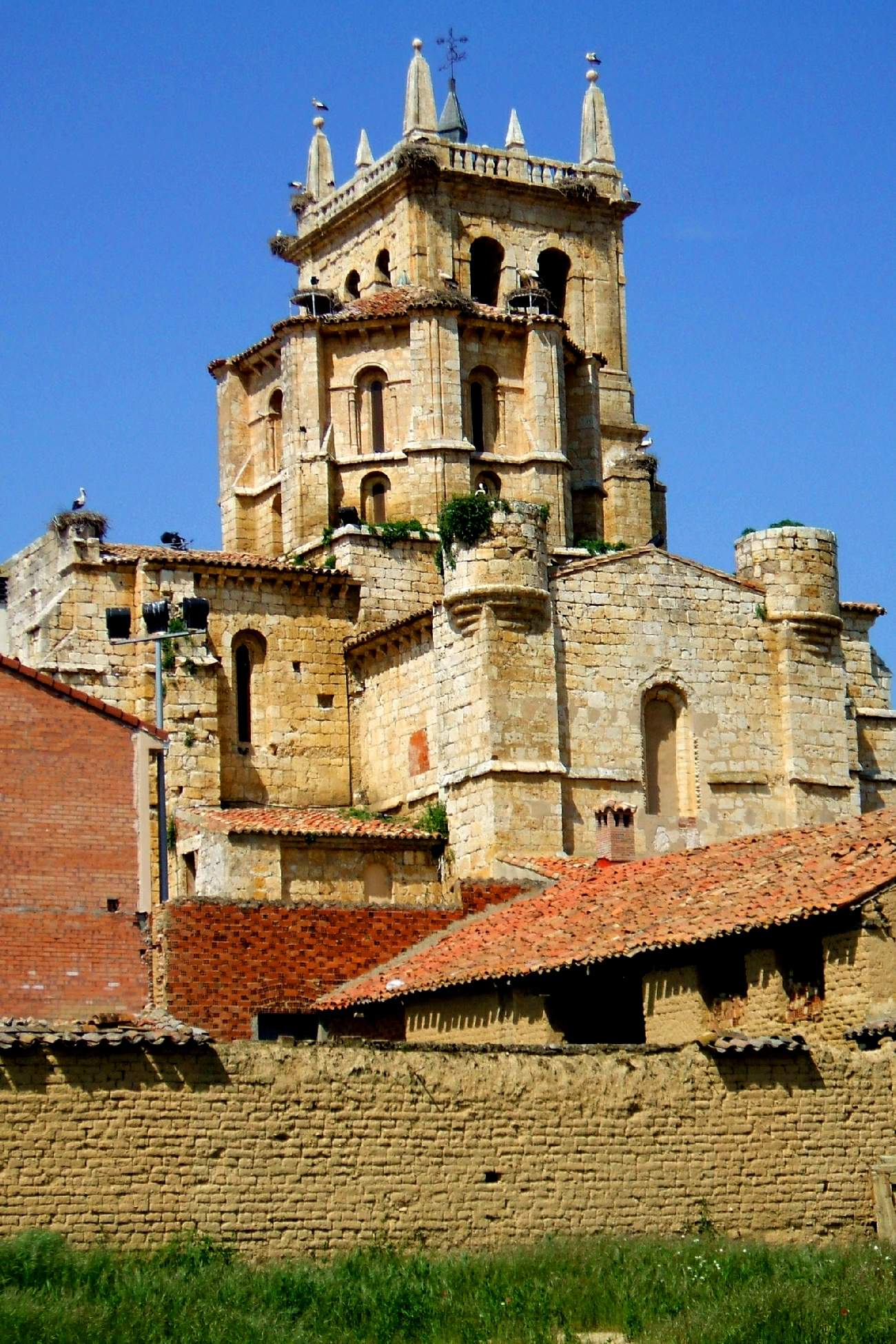
Santa María la Mayor church's apse
