= Dani Pérez (basketball) =

Spanish basketball player (born 1990)

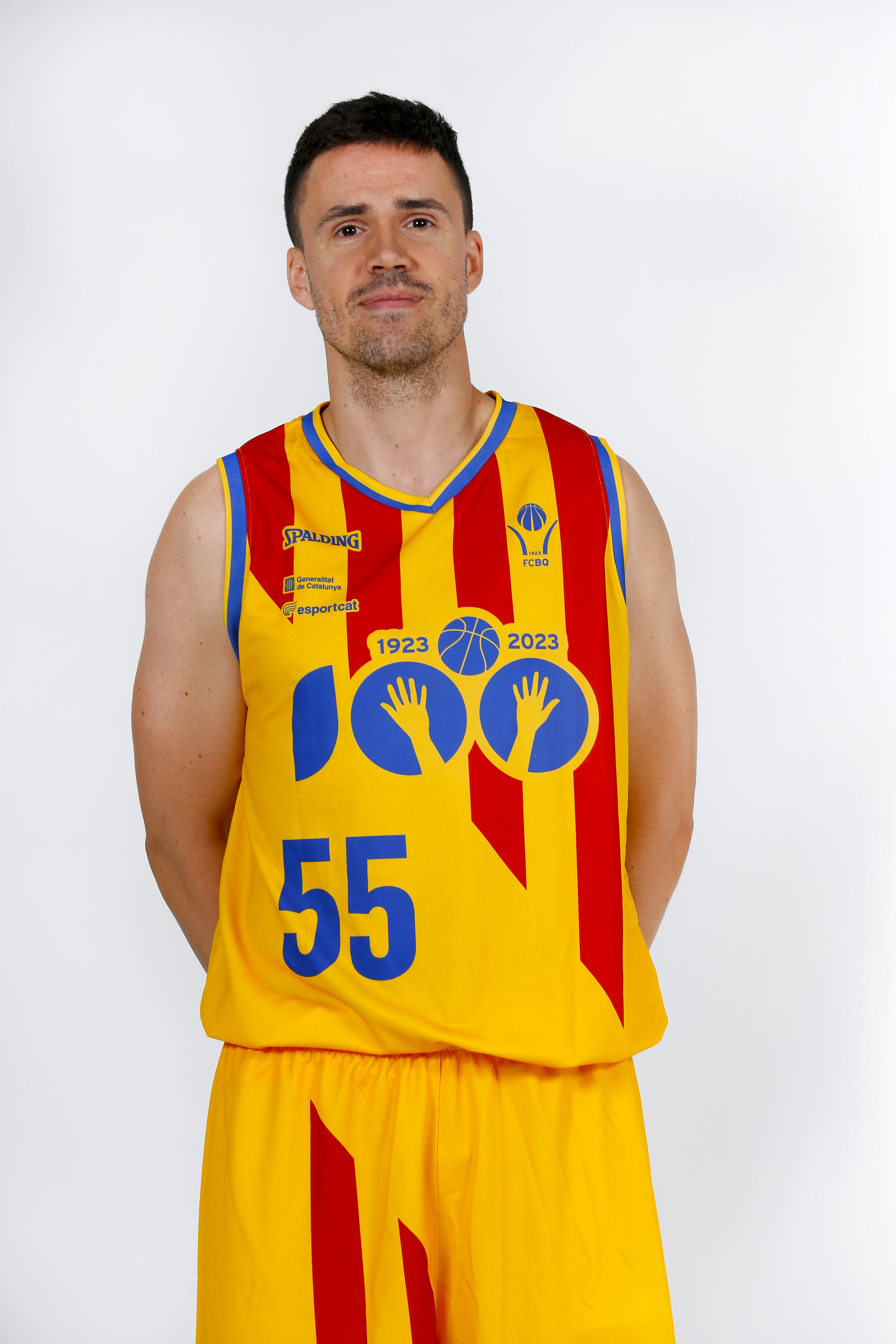
- Pérez with the Catalan national team in 2023

No. 55 – Palencia Baloncesto
- Position: Point guard
- League: Primera FEB

Personal information
- Born: February 28, 1990 (age 36) L'Hospitalet de Llobregat, Spain
- Listed height: 1.88 m (6 ft 2 in)
- Listed weight: 85 kg (187 lb)

Career information
- NBA draft: 2012: undrafted
- Playing career: 2008–present

Career history
- 2008–2011: FC Barcelona
- 2008–2010: →Cornellà
- 2010–2011: →Lleida
- 2011–2012: Menorca
- 2012–2013: Andorra
- 2013–2015: Fuenlabrada
- 2015–2016: Palencia
- 2016: Tenerife
- 2016–2017: Oviedo
- 2017–2019: Gipuzkoa
- 2019–2026: Manresa
- 2026–present: Palencia
Medals
Men's basketball
Representing Spain
FIBA U20 EuroBasket
Bronze medal – third place	2010 Croatia	U20 Team
FIBA U16 EuroBasket
Gold medal – first place	2006 Spain	U20 Team

Daniel Pérez Otero (born February 28, 1990) is a Spanish professional basketball player for Palencia of the Spanish Primera FEB. Standing at 6 ft 2 in (1.88 m), Pérez plays as a point guard.

== Early life and youth career ==
Born in L'Hospitalet de Llobregat, Catalonia, Pérez started playing basketball in local club C.C.R. Collblanc-Torrassa. He later joined the youth ranks of FC Barcelona at age 13. He would play with Barcelona's junior teams until 2008.

== Professional career ==
Still a FC Barcelona player, Pérez joined CB Cornellà on loan in his first year as a senior, playing in the LEB Plata. He would remain on loan with Cornellà the following season, playing in the LEB Oro after the team achieved promotion in the previous season. Pérez would spend a further season on loan with CE Lleida Bàsquet, playing once again in the LEB Oro.

After his contract with Barcelona expired in July 2011, Pérez joined Menorca Bàsquet in the LEB Oro.

Pérez signed with BC Andorra of the LEB Oro in July 2012. With Andorra, he would lead the 2012–13 LEB Oro in assists.

After his good performances in the LEB Oro, Pérez signed with Baloncesto Fuenlabrada in August 2013, finally making his Liga ACB debut.

Pérez would return to the LEB Oro in August 2015, signing for Palencia. After winning the 2015–16 LEB Oro championship and achieving promotion with Palencia, Pérez signed with Iberostar Tenerife in April 2016 to play the final rounds of the 2015–16 ACB season.

Pérez returned to the LEB Oro once again, signing with Oviedo CB in July 2016.

In August 2017, Pérez signed with Gipuzkoa Basket of the Liga ACB. Pérez player for the Basque team for two seasons, leading the team in assists in both.

=== Bàsquet Manresa (2019–2026) ===
Pérez signed a three-year contract with Bàsquet Manresa of the Liga ACB in June 2019. He would set a club record in his first season with the Catalans, recording 16 assists in a home win against UCAM Murcia in November 2019. It was also the 4th highest record in Liga ACB history. He would extend his contract with Manresa for three more years in March 2021. Shortly after, Pérez suffered a posterior cruciate ligament injury that would sideline him for three months.

Continuing to be an important player for Manresa and becoming the club's all-time leader in assists, Pérez signed a 2-year contract extension in April 2024.

In May 2026, Pérez announced he would be leaving Manresa at the end of the 2025–26 season, after having played 275 games for the Catalans. He played his last game on May 29, 2026, in which he received a farewell tribute at the Nou Congost. It was announced Manresa would retire his number, 55, upon his retirement.

In July 2026, Pérez returned to Palencia to play in the Primera FEB.

== National team career ==
Pérez has represented Spain's youth ranks in several international tournaments, such as the 2010 FIBA Europe Under-20 Championship with the U20 Team.

He made his debut for the senior Spanish national team in 2021, during the 2023 FIBA Basketball World Cup qualification.

Pérez has also represented the Catalan national team.

== Career statistics ==
Legend
GP	Games played	GS	Games started	MPG	Minutes per game
FG%	Field-goal percentage	3P%	3-point field-goal percentage	FT%	Free-throw percentage
RPG	Rebounds per game	APG	Assists per game	SPG	Steals per game
BPG	Blocks per game	PPG	Points per game	PIR	Performance index rating
**Bold**	Career high

=== Domestic leagues ===
==== Regular season ====
*	Led the league

Year	Team	League	GP	MPG	FG%	3P%	FT%	RPG	APG	SPG	BPG	PPG
2013–14	(Spain) Fuenlabrada	ACB	34	17.6	.400	.388	.741	2.0	2.1	1.1	.0	5.1
2014–15	(Spain) Fuenlabrada	ACB	17	14.4	.280	.200	.667	2.2	1.5	.5	.0	2.2
2015–16	(Spain) Tenerife	ACB	7	11.0	.286	.333	.500	.4	2.4	.6	.0	1.9
2017–18	(Spain) Gipuzkoa	ACB	33	20.8	.342	.244	.627	1.6	3.7	1.1	.0	5.8
2018–19	(Spain) Gipuzkoa	ACB	34	24.6	.398	.393	.725	1.9	5.3	1.3	.0	7.1
2019–20	(Spain) Manresa	ACB	21	23.4	.321	.185	.739	2.0	6.5	.9	.0	6.1
2020–21	(Spain) Manresa	ACB	24	24.2	.344	.299	.806	2.0	**6.6***	1.0	.0	7.8
2021–22	(Spain) Manresa	ACB	31	22.6	.373	.341	.766	2.2	4.7	1.2	.0	7.4
2022–23	(Spain) Manresa	ACB	34	21.9	.321	.336	.689	1.6	6.1	.9	.0	6.9
2023–24	(Spain) Manresa	ACB	28	19.6	.359	.315	.744	1.8	5.1	1.0	.0	7.6
2024–25	(Spain) Manresa	ACB	34	20.0	.327	.252	.600	1.8	4.5	.8	.0	5.9
2025–26	(Spain) Manresa	ACB	19	15.5	.297	.275	.778	1.5	3.7	.3	.0	3.9
