= Lamont Barnes =

American professional basketball player

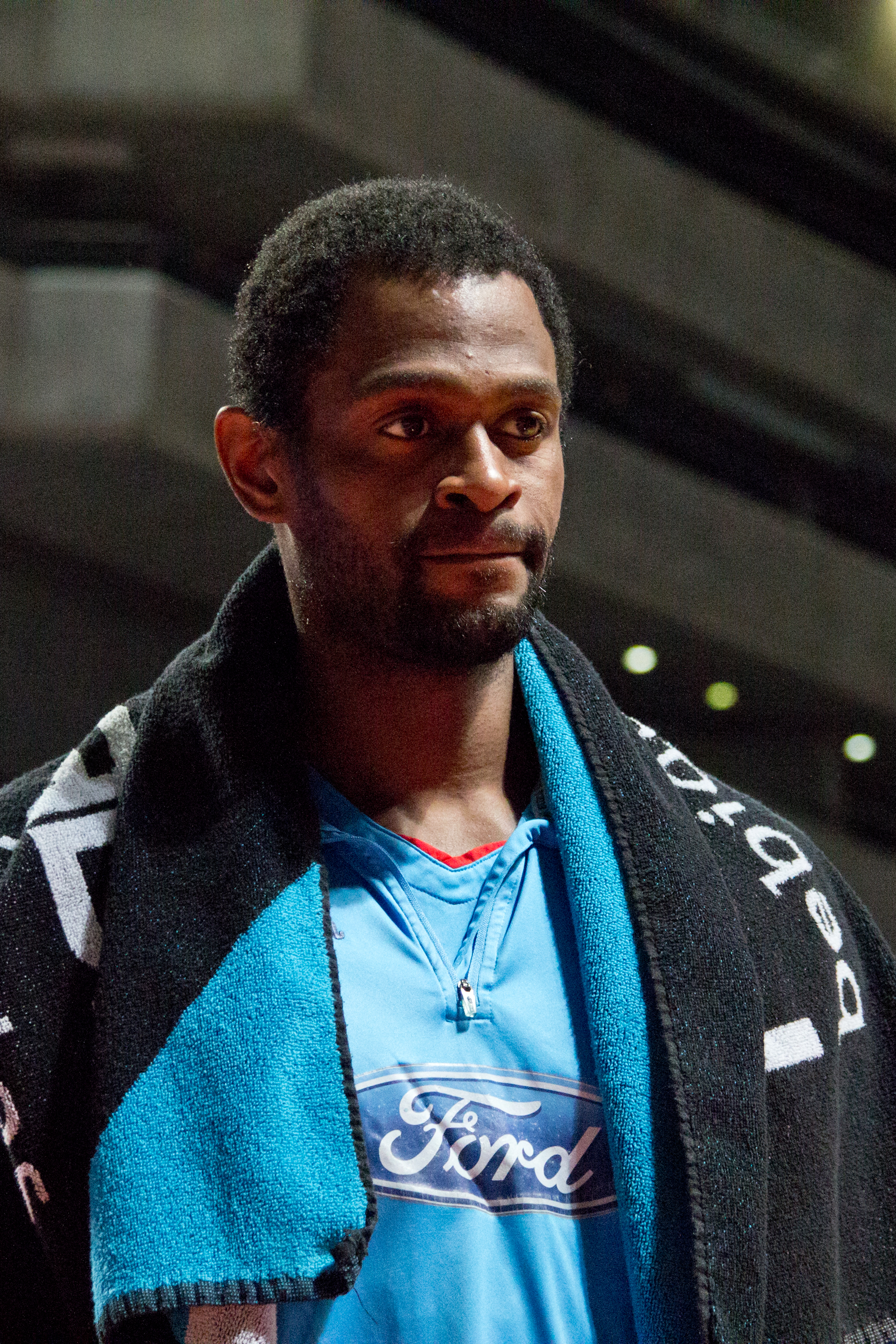

Free agent
- Position: Power forward / center

Personal information
- Born: September 4, 1978 (age 48) Lexington, Kentucky
- Listed height: 6 ft 10 in (2.08 m)
- Listed weight: 239.8 lb (109 kg)

Career information
- High school: University Heights Academy (Hopkinsville, Kentucky)
- College: Temple (1996–2000)
- NBA draft: 2000: undrafted
- Playing career: 2000–present

Career history
- 2000: Czarni Słupsk
- 2000–2001: Grand Rapids Hoops
- 2001: Maratonistas de Coamo
- 2001–2002: Virtus Ragusa
- 2002–2003: Scafati Basket
- 2003: Yakima Sun Kings
- 2004: JDA Dijon
- 2004: Criollos de Caguas
- 2004–2005: Baloncesto León
- 2005: Brujos de Guayama
- 2005–2006: Baloncesto León
- 2006: Lukoil Academic
- 2007: Holland Blast
- 2007: Baloncesto Fuenlabrada
- 2007–2008: Baloncesto León
- 2008–2009: Murcia
- 2009–2011: Valladolid
- 2011–2012: Lucentum Alicante
- 2012–2013: Estudiantes
- 2015–2018: Palencia
- 2018: Ciudad de Valladolid

Lamont Barnes (born September 4, 1978) is an American professional basketball player who last played for Carramimbre CBC Valladolid of the Spanish LEB Oro league.
