= Goran Huskić =

Serbian basketball player

No. 8 – Monbus Obradoiro
- Position: Center
- League: Primera FEB

Personal information
- Born: February 26, 1992 (age 34) Belgrade, Serbia, FR Yugoslavia
- Listed height: 2.10 m (6 ft 11 in)
- Listed weight: 102 kg (225 lb)

Career information
- College: Howard College (2012–2013)
- NBA draft: 2014: undrafted
- Playing career: 2009–present

Career history
- 2009–2012, 2013: Radnički Obrenovac
- 2013–2015: Gipuzkoa
- 2015–2016: Peñas Huesca
- 2016–2021: San Pablo Burgos
- 2020–2021: →Bilbao Basket
- 2021–2022: Mitteldeutscher
- 2022–2023: CBet Jonava
- 2023–2025: Básquet Coruña
- 2025–present: Monbus Obradoiro

Career highlights
- LEB Oro Final Four MVP (2017)

Goran Huskić (Serbian Cyrillic: Горан Хускић; born February 26, 1992) is a Serbian professional basketball player for Monbus Obradoiro of Primera FEB.

== Playing career ==
Huskić started his playing career with Radnički Obrenovac of the Second League of Serbia. He also played junior college basketball for one season.

In 2013, he moved to Spain where he played for Gipuzkoa Basket, Peñas Huesca and San Pablo Burgos of Second Spanish League. In 2017–18 season, San Pablo Burgos got promoted to Liga ACB and Huskić made a debut in the first Spanish league. In October 2020, he won the 2019–20 Basketball Champions League with Burgos. Huskić was loaned to RETAbet Bilbao Basket in November 2020.

On July 21, 2021, he has signed with Mitteldeutscher BC of the German Basketball Bundesliga.

On July 12, 2025, he signed with Monbus Obradoiro of Primera FEB.

== Career achievements ==
- LEB Oro All-Rising Stars team (2015–16)
- All-LEB Oro team (2016–17)

== See also ==
- Serbia at the 2019 FIBA Basketball World Cup qualification
