= Nemanja Mitrović (basketball) =

Canadian-Bosnian basketball player

Nemanja Mitrovic
Free agent
- Position: Shooting guard / small forward

Personal information
- Born: 27 July 1990 (age 36) Sarajevo, SR Bosnia and Herzegovina, SFR Yugoslavia
- Listed height: 6 ft 6 in (1.98 m)
- Listed weight: 200 lb (91 kg)

Career information
- High school: Northern Secondary School (Toronto, Ontario)
- College: Portland (2008–2012)
- NBA draft: 2012: undrafted
- Playing career: 2012–present

Career history
- 2012–2013: Kavala
- 2013–2014: Sutor Montegranaro
- 2015: Panelefsiniakos
- 2016: Berck
- 2016–2017: Ourense
- 2017–2018: Araberri
- 2019: Santos de San Luis
- 2019: Niagara River Lions

Nemanja Mitrovic (born 27 July 1990) is a Bosnian Canadian professional basketball player who last played for Niagara River Lions. He has also been a member of the Bosnia and Herzegovina national basketball team. He played college basketball for four years at the University of Portland (West Coast Conference, NCAA Division 1).

== High school ==
Mitrovic played for Northern Secondary School in Toronto, Canada. His senior season he averaged 21 points, 7 rebounds and 4 assists per game, while leading his team to a 20–11 record, and was named to the All-District All-Star Team. In 2007, he participated in the All-Canada All-Star game, where he won the 3-point shootout.

== College career ==
Mitrovic went on to play at the University of Portland, which plays in the West Coast Conference, between 2008 and 2012. He appeared in 101 career games for the Pilots and is 4th all-time in school history in 3-point field goals made (159), as well as 6th all-time in 3-point percentage (39%).

=== Freshman year (2008–2009) ===
During his freshman season, Mitrovic did not receive much playing time, appearing in only 16 games for the Pilots for a total of 43 minutes played. The Pilots finished the season 19–13. His best game came on 22 December against Howard, where he came off the bench to score 5 points and grab 2 rebounds in 9 minutes.

=== Sophomore year (2009–2010) ===
During his second season as a Pilot, Mitrovic became a bigger part of the rotation, appearing in 25 games while averaging 12.5 minutes per game. The Pilots finished the season 21–11 and were ranked in the Top 25 for the first time in school history after finishing 2nd at the 76 Classic in Anaheim. Mitrovic averaged 4.2 points and 1.5 rebounds per game while shooting 35.2% from 3. In conference play, that season, Mitrovic's averages jumped to 7.0 points and 2.4 rebounds in 17.2 minutes per game, while shooting 40.6% from 3. His best game came against San Francisco on 25 February, where he came off the bench to score 20 points and grab 6 rebounds in 25 minutes.

=== Junior year (2010–2011) ===
Mitrovic's breakout season came in his junior year. He started 31 out of 32 games while averaging 30.5 minutes per game helping the Pilots to a 20–12 record. After a slow start in the first 4 games, Mitrovic began to consistently put up good performances for the Pilots, including being named the WCC's Player of the Month during the month of December after which the Pilots were 12–2 going into conference play. During the month, he averaged 17.4 points while shooting 62.5% from 3 (30–48). He finished the season averaging 13.5 points, 3.3 rebounds and 1.6 assists while shooting 46.3% from 3 and was named to the WCC All-Conference 1st Team along with teammate Luke Sikma. His best game of the season came against San Francisco on 17 February where he scored 26 points and grabbed 6 rebounds. He also finished the season ranked 6th in the nation in 3-point percentage.

=== Senior year (2011–2012) ===
Before his senior season, Mitrovic was named to the WCC preseason All-Conference 1st team. He went on to start 25 out of 31 games that season while averaging 22 minutes per game, as the Pilots finished with a 7–24 record. Mitrovic averaged 7.9 points and 3.1 rebounds while shooting 31.5% from 3 and was named to the All-Star team at the World Vision Basketball Classic in November 2011. His best game came against Anthony Davis and the Kentucky Wildcats on 26 November, where he scored 20 points and grabbed 6 rebounds in 28 minutes. He graduated in 2012 with a degree in finance.

== Professional career ==
=== Kavala BC (2012–2013) ===
In August 2012, Mitrovic signed with Kavala B.C. of the A1 league in Greece. In 25 games in the A1 Greek league, Mitrovic posted averages of 9.2 points per game to go along with 2.5 rebounds per game in 25.4 minutes per game. He also shot 39% from 3. In 11 games in the Balkan league, he averaged 10.6 points per game to go along with 2.8 rebounds while shooting 47% from 3.

=== Sutor Montegranaro (2013–2014) ===
In September 2013, Mitrovic signed a one-year contract with Sutor Montegranaro in Italy, to play for legendary Italian coach Carlo Recalcati. In 29 games in Serie A, Mitrovic posted averages of 6.8 points per game to go along with 2.4 rebounds per game in 19.9 minutes per game while shooting 39.4% from 3.

=== Panelefsiniakos BC (2015) ===
In January 2015, he returned to Greece and signed with Panelefsiniakos of the Greek Basket League. In 13 games in the A1 Greek League, he averaged 8.5 points and 2 rebounds per game in 16.5 minutes per game, while shooting 53% from 2 and 39.6% from 3.

=== Berck (2016) ===
In January 2016, Mitrovic signed with Berck Basket in France. In 15 games with the club, he averaged 11.3 points, 2.5 rebounds and 2.1 assists in 22.7 minutes per game, while shooting 36% from 3.

=== Ourense (2016–2017) ===
In August 2016, Mitrovic signed with Ourense Provincia Termal of the Liga Española de Baloncesto. In 37 games in the Spanish Leb Oro League, he averaged 11.8 points, 3 rebounds and 1 assist in 28.5 minutes per game while shooting 53% from 2, 40% from 3 and 84% from the free throw line. On 18 October 2016, in a game against Retabet.es GBC, Mitrovic tied a league record by making 9 three-pointers in one game. He finished the game with 29 points and 8 rebounds while shooting 9/12 from three-point range. Ourense Provincia Termal lost to Union Financeria Baloncesto Oviedo in the first round of the playoffs.

=== Araberri (2017–2018) ===
In October 2017, Mitrović signed with Araberri of the Spanish LEB Oro.

== National team career ==
=== Canada ===
Mitrovic attended training camps with both the Junior (2008) and Senior (2011) National Teams of Canada. In 2011, he travelled with the Senior team on an international tour to Europe to play games against France, Italy and Czech Republic.

=== Bosnia & Herzegovina ===
Mitrovic is currently a member of the Bosnia & Herzegovina National Team. In 2012, he was on the 12 man roster which qualified for Eurobasket 2013, finishing first in their group. In 5 games, he averaged 2.8 points per game in 8 minutes per game. In 2014, he was on the 12 man roster led by coach Duško Ivanović, which finished first in their group and qualified for EuroBasket 2015. In 4 games, he averaged 5.3 points and 3.3 rebounds in 19.3 minutes per game.

== Personal life ==
Mitrović resides in Toronto, Canada. His father, Miroljub Mitrović, played professionally in Europe for 18 years (1979–1997) in Yugoslavia, Israel and Russia. He played for KK Bosna for 12 years under legendary coaches Svetislav Pešić and Bogdan Tanjević, among others, and was also a member of the Yugoslav national team.
