= Mamadou Samb =

Senegalese-Spanish basketball player

Free agent
- Position: Center

Personal information
- Born: December 31, 1989 (age 36) Dakar, Senegal
- Listed height: 208 cm (6 ft 10 in)
- Listed weight: 95 kg (209 lb)

Career information
- Playing career: 2007–present

Career history
- 2007–2010: FC Barcelona Bàsquet
- 2007–2010: →CB Cornellà
- 2010–2012: CB Granada
- 2012–2014: Bilbao Basket
- 2014–2016: Breogán
- 2016: Tindastóll
- 2016–2017: Palencia
- 2017–2018: Melilla
- 2018–2019: Real Betis
- 2019–2022: Al Bataeh
- 2023–2024: Al Wehda
- 2025: Arz Tannourine

Mamadou Samb Mbaye (born 31 December 1989) is a Senegalese-Spanish professional basketball player who last played for Real Betis Energía Plus of the LEB Oro. He has played in the EuroLeague with FC Barcelona Bàsquet and Bilbao Basket.

== Playing career ==
In September 2016, Samb signed with Tindastóll of the Icelandic Úrvalsdeild karla for the 2016–17 season. He was released from the club in November as a part of a major roster overhaul where Tindastóll also released Pape Seck and fired head coach José Maria Costa. In six games, Samb averaged 22.0 points and 9.5 rebounds.

In August 2017, Samb signed with Club Melilla Baloncesto of the LEB Oro. On September 27, 2018, Samb signed a two-year deal with Real Betis Energía Plus of the LEB Oro.

== Spanish national team ==
Samb played for Spanish national U-20 basketball team at the 2009 FIBA Europe Under-20 Championship where Spain finished third.

== Personal life ==
Samb is the younger brother of former NBA player Cheikh Samb.
