= Fran Guerra =

Spanish basketball player (born 1992)

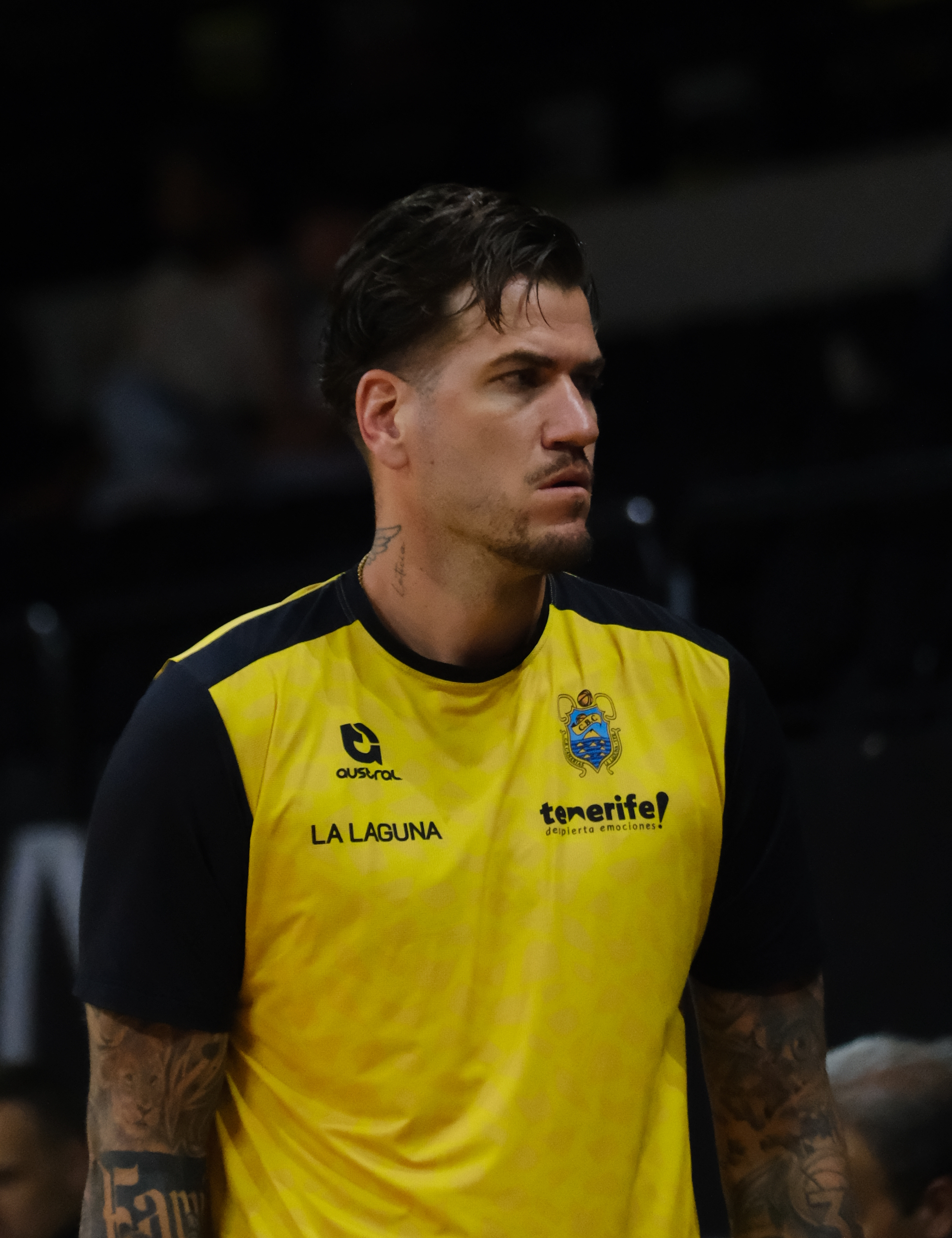
- Guerra with Lenovo Tenerife in 2025

No. 35 – Gran Canaria
- Position: Center
- League: Primera FEB

Personal information
- Born: 23 December 1992 (age 33) Las Palmas, Spain
- Listed height: 2.14 m (7 ft 0 in)
- Listed weight: 113 kg (249 lb)

Career information
- NBA draft: 2014: undrafted
- Playing career: 2012–present

Career history
- 2012–2016: Estudiantes
- 2014–2015: → Força Lleida
- 2016–2017: Ourense
- 2017–2018: Melilla
- 2018–2026: Tenerife
- 2018–2019: →Palma
- 2026–present: Gran Canaria

Career highlights
- Champions League champion (2022); 2× FIBA Intercontinental Cup champion (2020, 2023)

Francisco Javier Guerra Trujillo (born 23 December 1992) is a Spanish professional basketball player for Gran Canaria of the Spanish Primera FEB.

== Career ==
Born in the Canary Islands, Guerra joined the Estudiantes youth system to compete in the Liga EBA. He made his professional debut in the Liga ACB in the first matchday of the 2012–13 season, under head coach Txus Vidorreta. During the 2012–13 season, he averaged 12.6 points and 7.8 rebounds in the Liga EBA while appearing in eight games for the Estudiantes senior team in the Liga ACB. Although initially released at the end of the season, he was re-signed by the club at the start of the 2013–14 campaign.

For the 2014–15 season, Guerra was loaned to Força Lleida, where he averaged 14.5 points and 6 rebounds for a 20.5 PIR. In one notable performance, he recorded 12 points, 4 rebounds, and 4 steals in just 14 minutes of play. In 2015–16, Guerra completed his first full season in Liga ACB under head coach Diego Ocampo. He later returned to the LEB Oro for the 2016–17 season, joining Ourense Provincia Termal. After a stint with Melilla in 2017–18, Guerra signed with Tenerife in 2018 and was subsequently loaned to Iberojet Palma for one season. In 2019, he officially joined the main Tenerife squad in the ACB for the 2019–20 season.

On August 4, 2026, Guerra signed with Gran Canaria of the Primera FEB.

== National team career ==
Guerra represented Spain in various youth categories. He was a key contributor to the Spanish squad that won the bronze medal at the 2012 U20 European Championship, recording 13 points and six rebounds in the final game. On February 9, 2021, he received his first call-up to the senior Spanish national team for the final qualifying window of the EuroBasket 2022. While he was included in Sergio Scariolo's preliminary squad for the tournament, he was one of the last players cut during the final week of preparations.

== Awards and achievements ==
=== Spanish national team ===
- FIBA Europe Under-20 Championship: Bronze medal in 2012
