= 2014 LEB Oro playoffs =

The 2014 LEB Oro playoffs was the final stage of the 2013–14 LEB Oro season. They started on 11 April 2013, and finished on May 18.

The quarterfinals were played in a best-of-3 games format, while the semifinals and the finals in a best-of-5 games format. The best seeded team plays at home the games 1, 2 and 5 if necessary. Ford Burgos was the winner and promoted to 2014–15 ACB season with River Andorra MoraBanc, the champion of the regular season.

== Bracket ==
Quarterfinals
2	Quesos Cerrato Palencia	62	74	X
9	Instituto Fertilidad Clínicas Rincón	61	60	X
5	Leyma Natura Básquet Coruña	64	67	X
6	Unión Financiera Baloncesto Oviedo	70	76	X
3	Ford Burgos	91	84	X
8	Cocinas.com	70	70	X
4	Ribeira Sacra Breogán Lugo	69	65	80
7	Peñas Huesca	64	73	66

Semifinals
2	Quesos Cerrato Palencia	87	69	76	63	X
6	Unión Financiera Baloncesto Oviedo	47	65	79	51	X
3	Ford Burgos	68	94	80	X	X
4	Ribeira Sacra Breogán Lugo	64	54	58	X	X

Finals
2	Quesos Cerrato Palencia	77	64	64	60	X
3	Ford Burgos	62	69	73	78	X

== Quarterfinals ==
=== Quesos Cerrato Palencia – Instituto Fertilidad Clínicas Rincón ===
11 April 2014
21:00

Boxscore

Quesos Cerrato Palencia	62–61	Instituto Fertilidad Clínicas Rincón
Scoring by quarter: 17–15, 9–13, 20–15, 16–18
Pts: Bravo 16; Rebs: Bravo, Rejón 6 Asts: Rejón 4 PIR: Bravo 18		Pts: Conde 17; Rebs: Nguirane 8 Asts: Soulade 3 PIR: Soulade 17

Marta Domínguez, Palencia
Attendance: 2,500
Referees: García León, Morales García-Alcaide

19 April 2014
19:00

Boxscore

Instituto Fertilidad Clínicas Rincón	60–74	Quesos Cerrato Palencia
Scoring by quarter: 17–22, 19–16, 10–16, 14–20
Pts: Gutiérrez 17; Rebs: Nguirane 12; Asts: Conde, T. Sabonis 3 PIR: Nguirane 15		Pts: Otegui 21; Rebs: Rejón 8 Asts: Rejón 6 PIR: Otegui 29

Carranque, Málaga
Referees: Uruñuela Uruñuela, Caballero Madrid

=== Ford Burgos – Cocinas.com ===
11 April 2014
21:00

Boxscore

Ford Burgos	91–70	Cocinas.com
Scoring by quarter: 32–15, 16–19, 22–16, 21–20
Pts: Ortega 19; Rebs: Ortega 12; Asts: Sàbat 9 PIR: Ortega 31		Pts: Dobos 14; Rebs: Tomàs 7 Asts: Úriz 7 PIR: Dobos 24

El Plantío, Burgos
Attendance: 1,800
Referees: Pagán Baró, Gómez López

20 April 2014
19:00

Boxscore

Cocinas.com	70–84	Ford Burgos
Scoring by quarter: 18–20, 18–20, 22–25, 12–19
Pts: Ott, Úriz 11; Rebs: Nwogbo 8 Asts: Uriz 6 PIR: Uriz 18		Pts: Sàbat 18; Rebs: Ortega 7 Asts: Aguilar 4 PIR: Sàbat 18

Palacio de los Deportes, Logroño
Referees: Vázquez García, Sánchez Ardid

=== Ribeira Sacra Breogán Lugo – Peñas Huesca ===
11 April 2014
20:45

Boxscore

Ribeira Sacra Breogán Lugo	69–64	Peñas Huesca
Scoring by quarter: 19–16, 23–11, 10–21, 17–16
Pts: A. López 14; Rebs: Laso 8 Asts: D. Rodríguez, Schaftenaar 3 PIR: Laso 22		Pts: Romero 15; Rebs: Múgica 8 Asts: Cobos 5 PIR: Grigonis 16

Pazo dos Deportes, Lugo
Attendance: 3,500
Referees: Morales Ruiz, Carpallo Miguélez

20 April 2014
20:00

Boxscore

Peñas Huesca	73–65	Ribeira Sacra Breogán Lugo
Scoring by quarter: 24–18, 17–14, 15–19, 17–14
Pts: Grigonis 21; Rebs: Gatell 11; Asts: Romero 6 PIR: Grigonis, Múgica 23		Pts: McGee 17; Rebs: three players 6 Asts: D. Rodríguez 3 PIR: Schaftenaar 18

Palacio de Deportes, Huesca
Referees: De Lucas de Lucas, Bravo Loroño

22 April 2014
20:45

Boxscore

Ribeira Sacra Breogán Lugo	80–66	Peñas Huesca
Scoring by quarter: 29–16, 15–25, 19–10, 17–15
Pts: Pálsson 19; Rebs: Schaftenaar 8 Asts: D. Rodríguez 9 PIR: Schaftenaar 20		Pts: Washburn 12; Rebs: Múgica 12; Asts: Cobos, Grigonis 3 PIR: Múgica 22

Pazo dos Deportes, Lugo
Referees: Pagán Baró, Mas Cagide

=== Leyma Natura Básquet Coruña – Unión Financiera Baloncesto Oviedo ===
11 April 2014
21:00

Boxscore

Leyma Natura Básquet Coruña	64–70	Unión Financiera Baloncesto Oviedo
Scoring by quarter: 14–18, 22–13, 17–16, 11–23
Pts: Cain 30; Rebs: Cabanas 8 Asts: Ogirri 5 PIR: Cain 29		Pts: Cárdenas 20; Rebs: J.J. García 13; Asts: Muñoz 6 PIR: Cárdenas 24

Riazor, A Coruña
Attendance: 3,500
Referees: Garmendia Zorita, Mas Cagide

20 April 2014
19:00

Boxscore

Unión Financiera Baloncesto Oviedo	76–67	Leyma Natura Básquet Coruña
Scoring by quarter: 20–20, 24–21, 18–11, 14–15
Pts: Muñoz 23; Rebs: J.J. García 15; Asts: V. Pérez 6 PIR: Muñoz 23		Pts: Cain 16; Rebs: A. Hernández, Cain 7 Asts: A. Hernández, Ogirri 2 PIR: Cain 16

Pumarín, Oviedo
Referees: Terreros San Miguel, Muñoz García

== Semifinals ==
=== Quesos Cerrato Palencia – Unión Financiera Baloncesto Oviedo ===
25 April 2014
21:00

Boxscore

Quesos Cerrato Palencia	87–47	Unión Financiera Baloncesto Oviedo
Scoring by quarter: 28–14, 10–4, 23–18, 26–11
Pts: Bravo 24; Rebs: Moncasi 14; Asts: Garrido 5 PIR: Otegui 22		Pts: V. Pérez 10; Rebs: J.J. García, Garrett 8 Asts: D. Sánchez 2 PIR: D. Sánchez 10

Marta Domínguez, Palencia
Attendance: 2,500
Referees: Uruñuela Uruñuela, Vázquez García

27 April 2014
19:30

Boxscore

Quesos Cerrato Palencia	69–65	Unión Financiera Baloncesto Oviedo
Scoring by quarter: 15–18, 20–19, 16–12, 18–16
Pts: Otegui 16; Rebs: Rejón 7 Asts: Bravo, Forcada 3 PIR: Bravo 17		Pts: V. Pérez 29; Rebs: Muñoz 9 Asts: Muñoz 4 PIR: V. Pérez 19

Marta Domínguez, Palencia
Referees: De Lucas de Lucas, Bravo Loroño

2 May 2014
21:00

Boxscore

Unión Financiera Baloncesto Oviedo	79–76	Quesos Cerrato Palencia
Scoring by quarter: 12–22, 19–18, 20–20, 28–16
Pts: V. Pérez 22; Rebs: Van Wijk 11; Asts: Muñoz 5 PIR: V. Pérez 25		Pts: Otegui 20; Rebs: Otegui 9 Asts: Forcada, Garrido 2 PIR: Otegui 30

Pumarín, Oviedo
Referees: Pagán Baró, Mas Cagide

4 May 2014
21:00

Boxscore

Unión Financiera Baloncesto Oviedo	51–63	Quesos Cerrato Palencia
Scoring by quarter: 15–11, 13–14, 5–9, 18–29
Pts: four players 9 Rebs: Van Wijk 12; Asts: Cárdenas 4 PIR: Van Wijk 17		Pts: Fornas 22; Rebs: Rejón 9 Asts: Forcada 6 PIR: Fornas 24

Pumarín, Oviedo
Referees: Garmendia Zorita, Terreros San Miguel

=== Ford Burgos – Ribeira Sacra Breogán Lugo ===
25 April 2014
21:00

Boxscore

Ford Burgos	68–64	Ribeira Sacra Breogán Lugo
Scoring by quarter: 22–16, 16–14, 14–21, 16–13
Pts: Ortega 11; Rebs: Ortega 10; Asts: Maresch 4 PIR: Ortega 15		Pts: D. Rodríguez 15; Rebs: Laso 9 Asts: D. Rodríguez 3 PIR: A. López 20

El Plantío, Burgos
Attendance: 1,500
Referees: Sánchez Ardid, Caballero Madrid

27 April 2014
19:00

Boxscore

Ford Burgos	94–54	Ribeira Sacra Breogán Lugo
Scoring by quarter: 29–9, 27–15, 24–11, 14–19
Pts: Sàbat 23; Rebs: Mejeris 11; Asts: Sàbat 7 PIR: Sàbat 33		Pts: Chapela 11; Rebs: Laso 7 Asts: A. López 3 PIR: A. López 15

El Plantío, Burgos
Referees: Morales Ruiz, Rupérez Vielba

2 May 2014
21:00

Boxscore

Ribeira Sacra Breogán Lugo	58–80	Ford Burgos
Scoring by quarter: 15–29, 13–20, 9–18, 21–13
Pts: Schaftenaar 14; Rebs: Pálsson, Schaftenaar 5 Asts: Á. López 3 PIR: Schaftenaar 12		Pts: Xavier 15; Rebs: Mejeris, Olmos 6 Asts: Sàbat 5 PIR: Mejeris 17

Pazo dos Deportes, Lugo
Referees: De Lucas de Lucas, Vázquez García

== Final ==
=== Quesos Cerrato Palencia – Ford Burgos ===
9 May 2014
21:00

Boxscore

Quesos Cerrato Palencia	77–62	Ford Burgos
Scoring by quarter: 12–17, 30–12, 19–18, 16–15
Pts: Abouo 15; Rebs: Fornas 10; Asts: Garrido 5 PIR: Abouo 22		Pts: Coppenrath 12; Rebs: Ortega, Peña 5 Asts: six players 1 PIR: Sàbat 14

Marta Domínguez, Palencia
Referees: Morales Ruiz, Mas Cagide

11 May 2014
19:30

Boxscore

Quesos Cerrato Palencia	64–69	Ford Burgos
Scoring by quarter: 16–23, 13–12, 25–18, 10–16
Pts: Rejón 13; Rebs: Otegui 10; Asts: three players 3 PIR: Otegui 20		Pts: Coppenrath 21; Rebs: Olmos 7 Asts: Xavier 4 PIR: Coppenrath 24

Marta Domínguez, Palencia
Referees: Terreros San Miguel, Vázquez García

16 May 2014
21:00

Boxscore

Ford Burgos	73–64	Quesos Cerrato Palencia
Scoring by quarter: 9–16, 22–17, 29–17, 13–14
Pts: Coppenrath 15; Rebs: Ortega 15; Asts: Ortega 4 PIR: Coppenrath 21		Pts: Rejón 21; Rebs: Rejón 6 Asts: Rejón 4 PIR: Rejón 26

El Plantío, Burgos
Referees: Pagán Baró, De Lucas de Lucas

18 May 2014
18:00

Boxscore

Ford Burgos	78–60	Quesos Cerrato Palencia
Scoring by quarter: 17–27, 17–9, 20–17, 24–7
Pts: Bas, Ortega 14; Rebs: Ortega 9 Asts: Sàbat 4 PIR: Sàbat 19		Pts: Barbour 14; Rebs: Barbour, Otegui 5 Asts: Forcada 4 PIR: Barbour 13
Ford Burgos promotes to Liga ACB

El Plantío, Burgos
Referees: Morales Ruiz, Caballero Martín
