= 2017–18 LEB Oro season =

LEB Oro
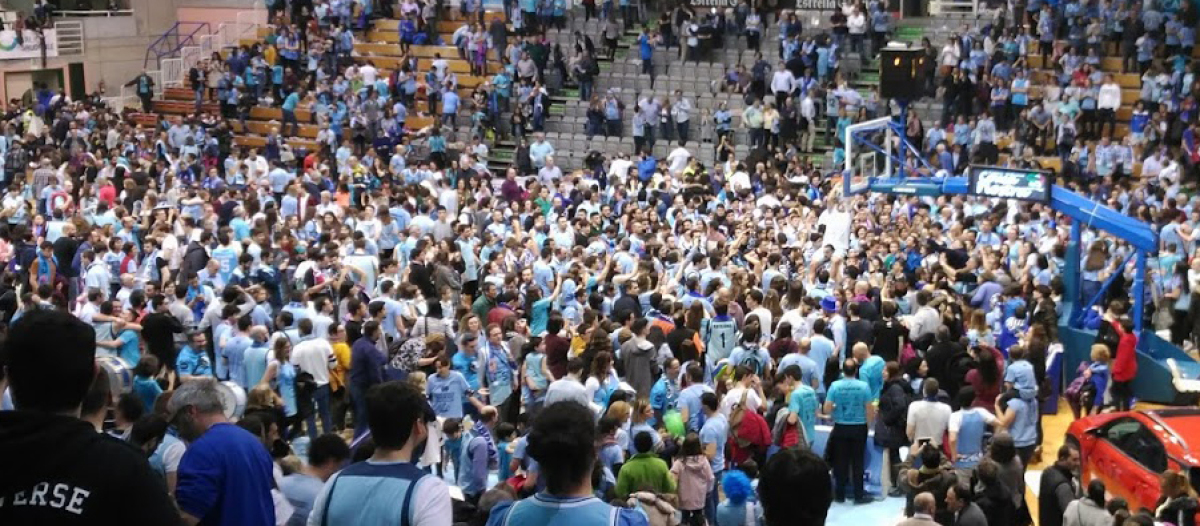
- Cafés Candelas Breogán promoted to Liga ACB 11 years after
- Season: 2017–18
- Games played: 336
- Teams: 18

Regular season
- Season MVP: Jordi Trias
- Promoted: Cafés Candelas Breogán; ICL Manresa
- Relegated: Sammic Hostelería; CB Clavijo

Finals
- Champions: Cafés Candelas Breogán (2nd title)

Awards
- Best Coach: Natxo Lezkano

Statistical leaders
| Points | Johnny Dee | 15.94 |
| Rebounds | Emanuel Cățe | 8.53 |
| Assists | Óscar Alvarado | 6.38 |
| Index Rating | Volodymyr Gerun | 21.13 |

Records
- Biggest home win: Breogán 96–50 CB Clavijo (16 December 2017)
- Biggest away win: Cáceres 64–92 Valladolid (21 March 2018)
- Highest scoring: Breogán 106–98 Araberri (1 April 2018); Araberri 112–92 Sammic (27 April 2018)
- Winning streak: 11 games Cafés Candelas Breogán
- Losing streak: 9 games Río Ourense Termal

The 2017–18 LEB Oro season was the 22nd season of the Spanish basketball second league. It started on 29 September 2017 with the first round of the regular season and ended on 12 June 2018 with the final.

Cafés Candelas Breogán won the league and promoted to Liga ACB twelve years after.

== Teams ==
=== Promotion and relegation (pre-season) ===
A total of 18 teams contested the league, including 14 sides from the 2016–17 season, two relegated from the 2016–17 ACB and two promoted from the 2016–17 LEB Plata. On July 18, 2017, CB Clavijo achieved the vacant of Sáenz Horeca Araberri. On August 30, 2017, Sáenz Horeca Araberri achieved the vacant generated after the inclusion of Real Betis Energía Plus in Liga ACB.

Teams relegated from Liga ACB

- ~~Real Betis Energía Plus~~
- ICL Manresa

Teams promoted from LEB Plata

- Sammic Hostelería
- Carramimbre CBC Valladolid

=== Venues and locations ===
Location of teams in 2017–18 LEB Oro

| Team | Home city | Arena | Capacity |
|---|---|---|---|
| Actel Força Lleida | Lleida | Pavelló Barris Nord | 6,100 |
| Cáceres Patrimonio de la Humanidad | Cáceres | Multiusos Ciudad de Cáceres | 6,500 |
| Cafés Candelas Breogán | Lugo | Pazo dos Deportes | 6,500 |
| Carramimbre CBC Valladolid | Valladolid | Pisuerga | 6,800 |
| CB Clavijo | Logroño | Palacio de los Deportes | 4,500 |
| CB Prat | El Prat de Llobregat | Pavelló Joan Busquets | 500 |
| Chocolates Trapa Palencia | Palencia | Pabellón Municipal (Note: Until the round 23, Chocolates Trapa Palencia played its home games at Pabellón Padre Adolfo Nicolás, in Villamuriel de Cerrato, instead of their home court Pabellón Municipal (formerly Pabellón Marta Domínguez), due to expansion works.) | 5,000 |
| Club Melilla Baloncesto | Melilla | Pabellón Javier Imbroda Ortiz | 3,800 |
| FC Barcelona Lassa B | Sant Joan Despí | Ciutat Esportiva Joan Gamper | 472 |
| Iberostar Palma | Palma | Son Moix | 3,800 |
| ICL Manresa | Manresa | Nou Congost | 5,000 |
| Levitec Huesca | Huesca | Palacio Municipal de Huesca | 4,900 |
| Leyma Coruña | A Coruña | Pazo dos Deportes de Riazor | 5,000 |
| Río Ourense Termal | Ourense | Pazo Paco Paz | 5,500 |
| Sáenz Horeca Araberri | Vitoria-Gasteiz | Mendizorrotza | 2,603 |
| Sammic Hostelería | Azpeitia | Municipal | 1,000 |
| TAU Castelló | Castellón de la Plana | Pabellón Ciutat de Castelló | 6,000 |
| Unión Financiera Baloncesto Oviedo | Oviedo | Polideportivo de Pumarín | 1,500 |

=== Personnel and sponsorship ===
| Team | Head coach | Kit manufacturer | Shirt sponsor |
|---|---|---|---|
| Actel Força Lleida | Jorge Serna | Joma | ActelGrup |
| Cáceres Patrimonio de la Humanidad | Ñete Bohígas | Vive | Extremadura |
| Cafés Candelas Breogán | Natxo Lezkano | Hummel | Cafés Candelas |
| Carramimbre CBC Valladolid | Paco García | Kappa | Bodegas Carramimbre |
| CB Clavijo | Jenaro Díaz | Mercury | Calzados Robusta |
| CB Prat | Arturo Álvarez | Spalding | |
| Chocolates Trapa Palencia | Alejandro Martínez | Kappa | Trapa |
| Club Melilla Baloncesto | Alejandro Alcoba | Super Sport | |
| FC Barcelona Lassa B | Alfred Julbe | Nike | Lassa Tyres |
| Iberostar Palma | Félix Alonso | Erreà | Iberostar, esportsIB |
| ICL Manresa | Diego Ocampo | Pentex | ICL Iberia |
| Levitec Huesca | Guillermo Arenas | Barri-Ball | Levitec, Aragon |
| Leyma Coruña | Gustavo Aranzana | Wibo | Leche Leyma, Galega 100% |
| Río Ourense Termal | Gonzalo García de Vitoria | Nike | Leche Rio, Ourense |
| Sáenz Horeca Araberri | Antonio Pérez | Wibo | Sáenz Horeca, Álava |
| Sammic Hostelería | Lolo Encinas | Wibo | Sammic |
| TAU Castelló | Toni Ten | Score Tech | TAU Cerámica |
| Unión Financiera Baloncesto Oviedo | Carles Marco | Spalding | Unión Financiera Asturiana, Oviedo, Asturias |

=== Managerial changes ===
| Team | Outgoing manager | Manner of departure | Date of vacancy | Position in table | Replaced with | Date of appointment |
|---|---|---|---|---|---|---|
| Leyma Coruña | Tito Díaz | End of contract | 1 June 2017 | Pre-season | Gustavo Aranzana | 28 June 2017 |
| ICL Manresa | Ibon Navarro | Resigned | 14 June 2017 | Pre-season | Aleix Durán | 15 July 2017 |
| CB Prat | Roberto Sánchez | End of contract | 18 June 2017 | Pre-season | Arturo Álvarez | 22 June 2017 |
| Chocolates Trapa Palencia | Sergio García | Mutual consent | 19 June 2017 | Pre-season | Joaquín Prado | 16 July 2017 |
| Sáenz Horeca Araberri | Arturo Álvarez | Signed with CB Prat | 22 June 2017 | Pre-season | Antonio Pérez | 5 September 2017 |
| Sammic Hostelería | Iker Bueno | End of contract | 12 July 2017 | Pre-season | Lolo Encinas | 13 July 2017 |
| CB Clavijo | Antonio Pérez | | | Pre-season | Jenaro Díaz | 28 July 2017 |
| Iberostar Palma | Xavier Sastre | Resigned | 24 December 2017 | 15th (5–10) | Félix Alonso | 28 December 2017 |
| Chocolates Trapa Palencia | Joaquín Prado | Sacked | 11 February 2018 | 12th (9–13) | Alejandro Martínez | 13 February 2017 |
| Actel Força Lleida | Borja Comenge | Sacked | 18 March 2018 | 14th (10–17) | Jorge Serna | 18 March 2018 |
| ICL Manresa | Aleix Duran | Sacked | 29 April 2018 | 3rd (before playoffs) | Diego Ocampo | 29 April 2018 |

== Regular season ==
=== League table ===
| Pos | Team | Pld | W | L | PF | PA | PD | Pts | Promotion, qualification or relegation |
|---|---|---|---|---|---|---|---|---|---|
| 1 | Cafés Candelas Breogán | 34 | 28 | 6 | 2958 | 2555 | +403 | 62 | Promotion to Liga ACB |
| 2 | CB Prat | 34 | 25 | 9 | 2504 | 2298 | +206 | 59 | Qualification to playoffs |
| 3 | ICL Manresa | 34 | 24 | 10 | 2683 | 2488 | +195 | 58 | Qualification to playoffs |
| 4 | Unión Financiera Baloncesto Oviedo | 34 | 22 | 12 | 2597 | 2515 | +82 | 56 | Qualification to playoffs |
| 5 | Club Melilla Baloncesto | 34 | 21 | 13 | 2534 | 2412 | +122 | 55 | Qualification to playoffs |
| 6 | TAU Castelló | 34 | 19 | 15 | 2629 | 2626 | +3 | 53 | Qualification to playoffs |
| 7 | Chocolates Trapa Palencia | 34 | 18 | 16 | 2547 | 2497 | +50 | 52 | Qualification to playoffs |
| 8 | Leyma Coruña | 34 | 16 | 18 | 2591 | 2602 | −11 | 50 | Qualification to playoffs |
| 9 | Carramimbre CBC Valladolid | 34 | 15 | 19 | 2628 | 2607 | +21 | 49 | Qualification to playoffs |
| 10 | Cáceres Patrimonio de la Humanidad | 34 | 15 | 19 | 2575 | 2708 | −133 | 49 | |
| 11 | Sáenz Horeca Araberri | 34 | 15 | 19 | 2821 | 2869 | −48 | 49 | |
| 12 | FC Barcelona Lassa B | 34 | 13 | 21 | 2575 | 2717 | −142 | 47 | |
| 13 | Iberostar Palma | 34 | 13 | 21 | 2495 | 2597 | −102 | 47 | |
| 14 | Río Ourense Termal | 34 | 13 | 21 | 2541 | 2587 | −46 | 47 | |
| 15 | Levitec Huesca | 34 | 13 | 21 | 2402 | 2546 | −144 | 47 | |
| 16 | Actel Força Lleida | 34 | 12 | 22 | 2530 | 2624 | −94 | 46 | |
| 17 | Sammic Hostelería | 34 | 12 | 22 | 2422 | 2652 | −230 | 46 | Relegation to LEB Plata |
| 18 | CB Clavijo | 34 | 12 | 22 | 2523 | 2655 | −132 | 46 | Relegation to LEB Plata |

Source: FEB

=== Positions by round ===
The table lists the positions of teams after the completion of each round. To preserve chronological evolvements, any postponed matches are not included in the round at which they were originally scheduled, but added to the full round they were played immediately afterward. For example, if a match is scheduled for round 13, but then postponed and played between rounds 16 and 17, it will be added to the standings for round 16.

| Team \ Round | 1 | 2 | 3 | 4 | 5 | 6 | 7 | 8 | 9 | 10 | 11 | 12 | 13 | 14 | 15 | 16 | 17 | 18 | 19 | 20 | 21 | 22 | 23 | 24 | 25 | 26 | 27 | 28 | 29 | 30 | 31 | 32 | 33 | 34 |
|---|---|---|---|---|---|---|---|---|---|---|---|---|---|---|---|---|---|---|---|---|---|---|---|---|---|---|---|---|---|---|---|---|---|---|
| Cafés Candelas Breogán | 2 | 13 | 9 | 7 | 5 | 1 | 1 | 1 | 1 | 1 | 1 | 1 | 1 | 1 | 1 | 1 | 1 | 1 | 1 | 1 | 1 | 1 | 1 | 1 | 1 | 1 | 1 | 1 | 1 | 1 | 1 | 1 | 1 | 1 |
| CB Prat | 1 | 2 | 6 | 3 | 2 | 3 | 3 | 3 | 2 | 2 | 2 | 2 | 2 | 2 | 2 | 3 | 3 | 2 | 2 | 2 | 2 | 2 | 2 | 2 | 3 | 3 | 2 | 3 | 3 | 3 | 3 | 3 | 2 | 2 |
| ICL Manresa | 3 | 6 | 3 | 2 | 1 | 2 | 2 | 2 | 3 | 3 | 3 | 3 | 4 | 3 | 3 | 2 | 2 | 3 | 5 | 5 | 4 | 4 | 3 | 3 | 2 | 2 | 3 | 2 | 2 | 2 | 2 | 2 | 3 | 3 |
| Unión Financiera Oviedo | 8 | 1 | 1 | 4 | 3 | 4 | 5 | 5 | 5 | 5 | 6 | 5 | 6 | 5 | 4 | 4 | 4 | 4 | 4 | 4 | 5 | 5 | 5 | 5 | 5 | 4 | 4 | 4 | 4 | 4 | 4 | 4 | 4 | 4 |
| Club Melilla Baloncesto | 5 | 3 | 2 | 1 | 4 | 5 | 4 | 4 | 4 | 4 | 4 | 4 | 3 | 4 | 5 | 5 | 5 | 5 | 3 | 3 | 3 | 3 | 4 | 4 | 4 | 5 | 5 | 5 | 5 | 5 | 5 | 5 | 5 | 5 |
| TAU Castelló | 15 | 9 | 14 | 14 | 13 | 17 | 17 | 15 | 12 | 8 | 9 | 7 | 11 | 10 | 7 | 7 | 8 | 7 | 6 | 6 | 6 | 6 | 6 | 6 | 6 | 6 | 7 | 6 | 6 | 6 | 6 | 6 | 6 | 6 |
| Trapa Palencia | 14 | 15 | 16 | 17 | 15 | 11 | 11 | 11 | 13 | 10 | 12 | 10 | 8 | 9 | 11 | 8 | 10 | 11 | 12 | 10 | 11 | 12 | 10 | 8 | 9 | 8 | 8 | 8 | 8 | 8 | 7 | 7 | 7 | 7 |
| Leyma Coruña | 10 | 5 | 11 | 15 | 17 | 12 | 10 | 12 | 14 | 15 | 11 | 9 | 7 | 7 | 8 | 10 | 9 | 9 | 8 | 9 | 7 | 8 | 9 | 7 | 7 | 7 | 6 | 7 | 7 | 7 | 8 | 8 | 8 | 8 |
| Carramimbre Valladolid | 7 | 14 | 15 | 16 | 14 | 8 | 7 | 6 | 6 | 6 | 5 | 6 | 5 | 6 | 6 | 6 | 6 | 6 | 7 | 7 | 8 | 7 | 7 | 9 | 10 | 10 | 10 | 9 | 9 | 9 | 9 | 9 | 9 | 9 |
| Cáceres P. Humanidad | 16 | 4 | 10 | 11 | 16 | 13 | 13 | 10 | 8 | 7 | 7 | 13 | 15 | 13 | 13 | 13 | 11 | 8 | 10 | 8 | 9 | 10 | 8 | 10 | 11 | 12 | 12 | 14 | 14 | 12 | 11 | 12 | 10 | 10 |
| Sáenz Horeca Araberri | 4 | 7 | 5 | 5 | 6 | 9 | 6 | 8 | 10 | 13 | 8 | 15 | 10 | 12 | 12 | 9 | 7 | 10 | 11 | 11 | 10 | 11 | 12 | 11 | 8 | 9 | 11 | 11 | 10 | 10 | 12 | 10 | 11 | 11 |
| FC Barcelona Lassa B | 6 | 11 | 13 | 9 | 10 | 16 | 16 | 14 | 15 | 16 | 13 | 11 | 13 | 14 | 14 | 14 | 14 | 14 | 14 | 14 | 14 | 14 | 14 | 15 | 16 | 15 | 15 | 17 | 17 | 16 | 18 | 15 | 13 | 12 |
| Iberostar Palma | 18 | 10 | 7 | 10 | 11 | 14 | 14 | 16 | 17 | 12 | 15 | 12 | 14 | 15 | 15 | 15 | 15 | 15 | 15 | 17 | 18 | 16 | 17 | 17 | 17 | 17 | 16 | 15 | 16 | 18 | 14 | 16 | 15 | 13 |
| Río Ourense Termal | 17 | 18 | 18 | 18 | 18 | 18 | 18 | 18 | 18 | 18 | 18 | 18 | 18 | 18 | 18 | 18 | 18 | 18 | 17 | 15 | 15 | 15 | 15 | 14 | 14 | 11 | 9 | 10 | 11 | 11 | 10 | 11 | 12 | 14 |
| Levitec Huesca | 12 | 17 | 17 | 12 | 8 | 6 | 9 | 9 | 7 | 9 | 10 | 8 | 12 | 11 | 10 | 11 | 13 | 13 | 13 | 13 | 12 | 13 | 13 | 12 | 13 | 13 | 13 | 12 | 12 | 15 | 17 | 13 | 16 | 15 |
| Actel Força Lleida | 13 | 16 | 12 | 13 | 9 | 7 | 12 | 13 | 9 | 11 | 14 | 14 | 9 | 8 | 9 | 12 | 12 | 12 | 9 | 12 | 13 | 9 | 11 | 13 | 12 | 14 | 14 | 13 | 13 | 13 | 13 | 14 | 17 | 16 |
| Sammic Hostelería | 9 | 12 | 8 | 6 | 7 | 10 | 8 | 7 | 11 | 14 | 16 | 16 | 16 | 16 | 16 | 16 | 17 | 17 | 18 | 18 | 17 | 18 | 16 | 16 | 15 | 16 | 17 | 18 | 18 | 17 | 16 | 18 | 14 | 17 |
| CB Clavijo | 11 | 8 | 4 | 8 | 12 | 15 | 15 | 17 | 16 | 17 | 17 | 17 | 17 | 17 | 17 | 17 | 16 | 16 | 16 | 16 | 16 | 17 | 18 | 18 | 18 | 18 | 18 | 16 | 15 | 14 | 15 | 17 | 18 | 18 |

Source: FEB

=== Results ===
| Home \ Away | FLL | BRE | CAC | VLL | CLA | PRA | PAL | MEL | FCB | PLM | MAN | HUE | COR | COB | ARA | ISB | CAS | OVI |
|---|---|---|---|---|---|---|---|---|---|---|---|---|---|---|---|---|---|---|
| Força Lleida | — | 73–86 | 91–67 | 71–81 | 70–62 | 66–58 | 75–84 | 60–68 | 95–78 | 89–94 | 68–74 | 59–69 | 72–78 | 73–77 | 94–84 | 76–65 | 75–84 | 74–80 |
| Breogán | 81–49 | — | 101–73 | 96–74 | 96–50 | 85–63 | 80–82 | 78–67 | 105–64 | 93–80 | 98–81 | 91–53 | 84–73 | 83–71 | 106–98 | 93–89 | 97–69 | 91–65 |
| Cáceres | 84–73 | 77–84 | — | 64–92 | 91–77 | 60–82 | 71–68 | 75–73 | 95–73 | 79–77 | 74–68 | 57–71 | 80–61 | 84–75 | 89–85 | 77–81 | 83–75 | 72–97 |
| Valladolid | 75–60 | 84–85 | 85–65 | — | 87–92 | 59–65 | 67–72 | 95–70 | 73–87 | 84–89 | 65–74 | 83–75 | 94–84 | 81–93 | 106–85 | 62–73 | 90–73 | 91–86 |
| CB Clavijo | 75–81 | 76–92 | 71–76 | 85–72 | — | 62–68 | 91–82 | 71–73 | 72–80 | 76–60 | 73–61 | 103–85 | 85–66 | 59–69 | 73–76 | 75–58 | 78–74 | 80–84 |
| CB Prat | 84–60 | 79–81 | 70–59 | 67–57 | 83–57 | — | 71–69 | 70–73 | 78–69 | 78–76 | 87–79 | 67–59 | 75–60 | 86–76 | 85–67 | 76–72 | 68–69 | 65–61 |
| Trapa Palencia | 85–79 | 70–74 | 71–80 | 76–73 | 86–71 | 67–76 | — | 69–72 | 62–64 | 81–77 | 72–76 | 83–76 | 76–64 | 74–72 | 97–96 | 80–63 | 70–73 | 73–62 |
| Melilla | 80–95 | 79–83 | 94–65 | 79–62 | 76–68 | 62–69 | 67–60 | — | 71–54 | 87–72 | 68–66 | 92–48 | 58–85 | 91–80 | 90–66 | 84–77 | 75–68 | 61–64 |
| Barcelona B | 76–69 | 72–81 | 87–78 | 75–84 | 68–88 | 78–71 | 71–74 | 71–84 | — | 69–53 | 94–103 | 88–85 | 72–79 | 83–69 | 77–89 | 80–64 | 77–87 | 71–86 |
| Palma | 76–80 | 80–70 | 69–64 | 74–62 | 95–76 | 65–79 | 60–72 | 57–69 | 76–65 | — | 74–82 | 68–60 | 90–97 | 67–69 | 71–70 | 56–80 | 78–80 | 76–84 |
| ICL Manresa | 68–74 | 90–78 | 81–73 | 78–75 | 91–70 | 75–62 | 78–73 | 69–77 | 91–76 | 72–67 | — | 73–54 | 75–81 | 89–65 | 99–88 | 88–61 | 93–62 | 70–68 |
| Levitec Huesca | 64–73 | 87–76 | 81–78 | 63–67 | 62–79 | 73–81 | 64–67 | 80–70 | 77–73 | 71–79 | 77–82 | — | 82–63 | 72–69 | 82–70 | 73–69 | 70–65 | 66–70 |
| Leyma Coruña | 93–74 | 86–93 | 79–75 | 59–67 | 80–66 | 65–81 | 96–78 | 67–78 | 89–79 | 79–90 | 66–74 | 70–76 | — | 77–75 | 76–68 | 79–59 | 64–52 | 71–76 |
| Río Ourense | 75–84 | 79–67 | 90–72 | 65–72 | 70–72 | 61–58 | 71–74 | 52–61 | 76–81 | 63–76 | 86–78 | 73–59 | 84–87 | — | 98–75 | 77–65 | 65–75 | 70–61 |
| Araberri | 93–84 | 97–91 | 78–91 | 83–81 | 95–79 | 49–75 | 80–72 | 78–73 | 80–68 | 85–88 | 70–71 | 94–89 | 80–99 | 90–97 | — | 112–92 | 82–74 | 104–74 |
| Sammic | 80–75 | 61–81 | 79–74 | 73–67 | 77–72 | 69–73 | 69–86 | 71–67 | 66–86 | 70–62 | 62–71 | 76–73 | 72–71 | 89–80 | 66–88 | — | 71–96 | 70–77 |
| TAU Castelló | 79–75 | 89–91 | 91–90 | 97–98 | 85–69 | 76–70 | 78–75 | 88–76 | 80–90 | 82–66 | 69–87 | 63–78 | 82–76 | 82–64 | 89–88 | 78–67 | — | 83–62 |
| Oviedo | 67–64 | 75–87 | 78–83 | 74–63 | 86–70 | 82–84 | 73–72 | 79–69 | 87–79 | 80–57 | 81–76 | 80–61 | 80–71 | 90–85 | 73–78 | 87–66 | 68–62 | — |

Source: FEB
Legend: Blue = home team win; Red = away team win.

== Playoffs ==
Quarter-finals
2 CB Prat | 82 | 57 | 58
9 Carramimbre Valladolid | 54 | 49 | 51
5 Club Melilla Baloncesto | 95 | 83 | 67 | 73
6 TAU Castelló | 67 | 80 | 71 | 66
3 ICL Manresa | 70 | 74 | 72 | 85 | 71
8 Leyma Coruña | 59 | 80 | 75 | 80 | 68
4 Unión Financiera Oviedo | 64 | 91 | 60 | 81 | 54
7 Trapa Palencia | 58 | 76 | 64 | 91 | 66

Semi-finals
2 CB Prat | 63 | 63 | 75 | 78 | 63
5 Club Melilla Baloncesto | 64 | 59 | 79 | 66 | 64
3 ICL Manresa | 86 | 82 | 83
7 Trapa Palencia | 85 | 80 | 76

Final
5 Club Melilla Baloncesto | 76 | 74 | 78 | 86 | 67
3 ICL Manresa | 83 | 76 | 74 | 74 | 97

Source: FEB

== Copa Princesa de Asturias ==
The Copa Princesa de Asturias was played on 3 February 2018, by the two first qualified teams after the end of the first half of the season (round 17). The champion of the cup play the playoffs as first qualified if it finishes the league between the second and the fifth qualified.

=== Teams qualified ===
| Pos | Team | Pld | W | L | PF | PA | PD | Pts |
|---|---|---|---|---|---|---|---|---|
| 1 | Cafés Candelas Breogán | 17 | 15 | 2 | 1481 | 1258 | +223 | 32 |
| 2 | ICL Manresa | 17 | 13 | 4 | 1339 | 1201 | +138 | 30 |

Source: FEB

=== Game ===
| 3 February 2018 | Cafés Candelas Breogán | 90–86 | ICL Manresa | Lugo |
| 20:45 | Scoring by quarter: 23–19, 32–14, 18–31, 17–22 |
| | Pts: Úriz 23; Rebs: three players 5 Asts: Úriz 4 Eff: Rubio 27 | Boxscore | Pts: Trias 16; Rebs: Trias 5 Asts: Costa 7 Eff: Trias 21 | Arena: Pazo dos Deportes; Attendance: 5,000; Referees: Ángel de Lucas de Lucas, Asier Quintas Álvarez, Carlos Merino Campos |

== Final standings ==
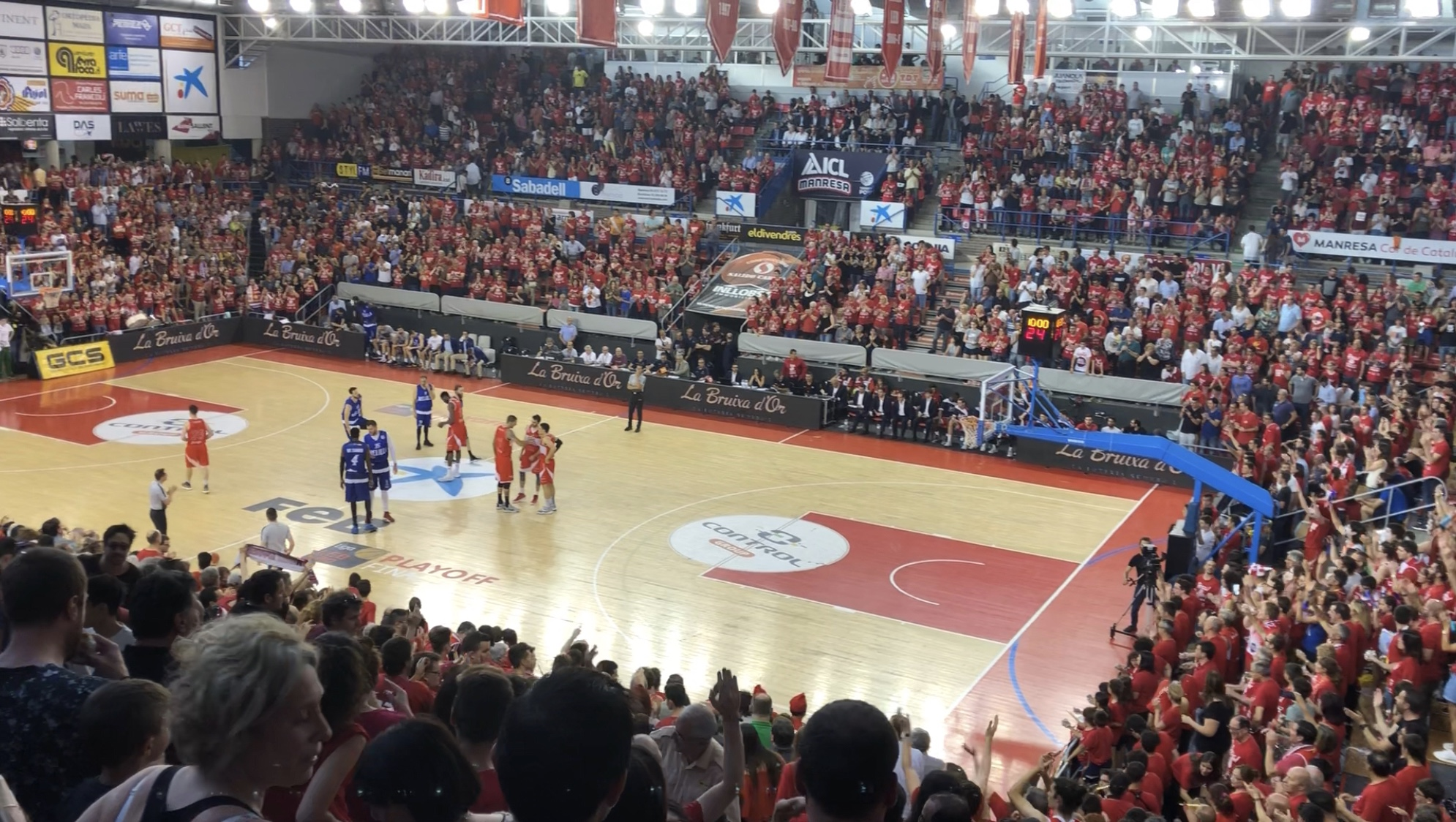
ICL Manresa beat Club Melilla Baloncesto in the do-or-die game for promotion.

| Pos | Team | Pld | W | L | Promotion or relegation |
|---|---|---|---|---|---|
| 1 | Cafés Candelas Breogán (C, P, X) | 34 | 28 | 6 | Promotion to Liga ACB |
| 2 | ICL Manresa (P) | 47 | 33 | 14 | Promotion to Liga ACB |
| 3 | Club Melilla Baloncesto | 48 | 29 | 19 | |
| 4 | CB Prat | 42 | 30 | 12 | |
| 5 | Chocolates Trapa Palencia | 42 | 21 | 21 | |
| 6 | Unión Financiera Baloncesto Oviedo | 39 | 24 | 15 | |
| 7 | TAU Castelló | 38 | 20 | 18 | |
| 8 | Leyma Coruña | 39 | 18 | 21 | |
| 9 | Carramimbre CBC Valladolid | 37 | 15 | 22 | |
| 10 | Cáceres Patrimonio de la Humanidad | 34 | 15 | 19 | |
| 11 | Sáenz Horeca Araberri | 34 | 15 | 19 | |
| 12 | FC Barcelona Lassa B | 34 | 13 | 21 | |
| 13 | Iberostar Palma | 34 | 13 | 21 | |
| 14 | Río Ourense Termal | 34 | 13 | 21 | |
| 15 | Levitec Huesca | 34 | 13 | 21 | |
| 16 | Actel Força Lleida | 34 | 12 | 22 | |
| 17 | Sammic Hostelería (R) | 34 | 12 | 22 | Relegation to LEB Plata |
| 18 | CB Clavijo (R) | 34 | 12 | 22 | Relegation to LEB Plata |

Source: FEB
(C) Champions; (P) Promoted; (R) Relegated; (X) Champion of the Copa Princesa de Asturias

== Individual statistics ==
=== Points ===
| Rank | Name | Team | Games | Points | PPG |
|---|---|---|---|---|---|
| 1 | (United States) Johnny Dee | Sáenz Horeca Araberri | 34 | 542 | 15.94 |
| 2 | (United States) Reggie Johnson | Río Ourense Termal | 34 | 516 | 15.18 |
| 3 | (Spain) Sergio de la Fuente | Carramimbre CBC Valladolid | 34 | 511 | 15.03 |
| 4 | (United States) Alec Wintering | Sáenz Horeca Araberri | 34 | 510 | 15 |
| 5 | (Ukraine) Volodymyr Gerun | FC Barcelona Lassa B | 30 | 444 | 14.8 |

Source: FEB

=== Rebounds ===
| Rank | Name | Team | Games | Rebounds | RPG |
|---|---|---|---|---|---|
| 1 | (Romania) Emanuel Cățe | CB Prat | 30 | 256 | 8.53 |
| 2 | (United States) Evan Yates | CB Clavijo | 34 | 288 | 8.47 |
| 3 | (Spain) Jordi Trias | ICL Manresa | 34 | 271 | 7.97 |
| 4 | (Ukraine) Volodymyr Gerun | FC Barcelona Lassa B | 30 | 237 | 7.9 |
| 5 | (Senegal) Atoumane Diagne | FC Barcelona Lassa B | 33 | 252 | 7.64 |

Source: FEB

=== Assists ===
| Rank | Player | Team | Games | Assists | APG |
|---|---|---|---|---|---|
| 1 | (Spain) Óscar Alvarado | Carramimbre CBC Valladolid | 32 | 204 | 6.38 |
| 2 | (Spain) Guillermo Corrales | Cáceres Patrimonio de la Humanidad | 29 | 161 | 5.55 |
| 3 | (United States) Alec Wintering | Sáenz Horeca Araberri | 34 | 186 | 5.47 |
| 4 | (Spain) Pol Figueras | FC Barcelona Lassa B | 34 | 176 | 5.18 |
| 5 | (United States) Zach Monaghan | Leyma Coruña | 28 | 136 | 4.86 |

Source: FEB

=== Efficiency ===
| Rank | Player | Team | Games | Efficiency | EPG |
|---|---|---|---|---|---|
| 1 | (Ukraine) Volodymyr Gerun | FC Barcelona Lassa B | 30 | 634 | 21.13 |
| 2 | (Spain) Jordi Trias | ICL Manresa | 34 | 717 | 21.09 |
| 3 | (Spain) Óliver Arteaga | Unión Financiera Baloncesto Oviedo | 25 | 508 | 20.32 |
| 4 | (Romania) Emanuel Cățe | CB Prat | 30 | 562 | 18.73 |
| 5 | (United States) Evan Yates | CB Clavijo | 34 | 615 | 18.09 |

Source: FEB

== Awards ==
All official awards of the 2017–18 LEB Oro season.

=== MVP ===
| Pos. | Player | Team |
|---|---|---|
| PF | (Spain) Jordi Trias | ICL Manresa |

=== All-LEB Oro Team ===
| Pos. | Player | Team |
|---|---|---|
| PG | (United States) Alec Wintering | Sáenz Horeca Araberri |
| SG | (United States) Johnny Dee | Sáenz Horeca Araberri |
| SF | (United States) Kedar Edwards | Sáenz Horeca Araberri |
| PF | (Spain) Jordi Trias | ICL Manresa |
| C | (Ukraine) Volodymyr Gerun | FC Barcelona Lassa B |

=== Best Coach ===
| Coach | Team |
|---|---|
| (Spain) Natxo Lezkano | Cafés Candelas Breogán |

=== Player of the round ===
| Round | Player | Team | Eff. |
|---|---|---|---|
| 1 | (Ukraine) Volodymyr Gerun | FC Barcelona Lassa B | 35 |
| 2 | (Spain) Edu Gatell | TAU Castelló | 31 |
| 3 | (United States) Alec Wintering | Sáenz Horeca Araberri | 31 |
| 3 | (Netherlands) Kevin van Wijk | Levitec Huesca | 31 |
| 4 | (Spain) Jordi Trias | ICL Manresa | 37 |
| 5 | (Lithuania) Gediminas Žylė | Iberostar Palma | 28 |
| 5 | (United States) Reggie Johnson | Río Ourense Termal | 28 |
| 6 | (Lithuania) Gediminas Žylė (2) | Iberostar Palma | 31 |
| 7 | (Sweden) Johan Löfberg | Cafés Candelas Breogán | 34 |
| 8 | (Canada) Caleb Agada | CB Prat | 44 |
| 9 | (Australia) Dan Trist | Río Ourense Termal | 32 |
| 10 | (Spain) Jordi Trias (2) | ICL Manresa | 32 |
| 11 | (Netherlands) Kevin van Wijk (2) | Levitec Huesca | 37 |
| 12 | (Spain) Josep Pérez | CB Prat | 33 |
| 13 | (Ukraine) Volodymyr Gerun (2) | FC Barcelona Lassa B | 34 |
| 14 | (United States) Alec Wintering (2) | Sáenz Horeca Araberri | 29 |
| 15 | (Trinidad and Tobago) Kyle Rowley | TAU Castelló | 42 |
| 16 | (United States) Matt Stainbrook | Cafés Candelas Breogán | 31 |
| 17 | (United States) Tim Derksen | Actel Força Lleida | 31 |
| 18 | (Romania) Emanuel Cățe | CB Prat | 43 |
| 19 | (Ukraine) Volodymyr Gerun (3) | FC Barcelona Lassa B | 37 |
| 20 | (United States) Evan Yates | CB Clavijo | 41 |
| 21 | (United States) Johnny Dee | Sáenz Horeca Araberri | 44 |
| 22 | (United States) Greg Gantt | Carramimbre CBC Valladolid | 32 |
| 23 | (Spain) Óliver Arteaga | Unión Financiera Baloncesto Oviedo | 38 |
| 24 | (United States) Evan Yates (2) | CB Clavijo | 40 |
| 25 | (Spain) Salva Arco | Cafés Candelas Breogán | 34 |
| 26 | (United States) Alfredo Ott | TAU Castelló | 38 |
| 27 | (Brazil) Leo Demetrio | Cafés Candelas Breogán | 33 |
| 28 | (Romania) Emanuel Cățe (2) | CB Prat | 28 |
| 28 | (Norway) Karamo Jawara | Iberostar Palma | 28 |
| 29 | (Spain) Erik Quintela | CB Clavijo | 29 |
| 30 | (United States) Matt Stainbrook (2) | Cafés Candelas Breogán | 45 |
| 31 | (Romania) Emanuel Cățe (3) | CB Prat | 35 |
| 32 | (United States) Evan Yates (3) | CB Clavijo | 36 |
| 33 | (Spain) Sergi Quintela | Cafés Candelas Breogán | 32 |
| 34 | (United States) Alec Wintering (3) | Sáenz Horeca Araberri | 40 |
| QF1 | (Spain) Jordi Trias (3) | ICL Manresa | 33 |
| QF2 | (Spain) Fran Guerra | Club Melilla Baloncesto | 33 |
| QF3 | (Spain) Óliver Arteaga (2) | Unión Financiera Baloncesto Oviedo | 25 |
| QF4 | (Spain) Urko Otegui | Chocolates Trapa Palencia | 36 |
| QF5 | (Denmark) Gabriel Lundberg | ICL Manresa | 34 |
| SF1 | (United States) Bryce Pressley | Chocolates Trapa Palencia | 26 |
| SF1 | (Spain) Jordi Trias (4) | ICL Manresa | 26 |
| SF2 | (Spain) Nacho Martín | ICL Manresa | 27 |
| SF3 | (Spain) Urko Otegui (2) | Chocolates Trapa Palencia | 22 |
| SF4 | (Spain) Fran Guerra (2) | Club Melilla Baloncesto | 28 |
| SF5 | (Spain) Marc Blanch | CB Prat | 22 |
| F1 | (Spain) Jordi Trias (5) | ICL Manresa | 32 |
| F2 | (Spain) Jordi Trias (6) | ICL Manresa | 20 |
| F3 | (Canada) Diego Kapelan | Club Melilla Baloncesto | 22 |
| F3 | (Spain) Fran Guerra (3) | Club Melilla Baloncesto | 22 |
| F4 | (Senegal) Mamadou Samb | Club Melilla Baloncesto | 21 |
| F5 | (Spain) Jordi Trias (7) | ICL Manresa | 22 |

Source: FEB
