= 2011–12 LEB Plata season =

- League: LEB Plata
- Sport: Basketball
- Number of games: 156 (regular season)
- Number of teams: 13

Regular Season
- Season champions: River Andorra
- Season MVP: (Montenegro) Marko Todorović
- Top scorer: (United States) Alfredo Ott

Play-offs
- Play-offs champions: Aguas de Sousas Ourense
- Play-offs runners-up: CB Prat Joventut

Copa LEB Plata
- Champions: Aurteneche Maquinaria
- Runners-up: River Andorra
- Finals MVP: (Spain) Alberto Ausina

LEB Plata seasons
- ← 2010–11 2012–13 →

The 2011–12 LEB Plata season is the 12th season of the LEB Plata, second league of the Liga Española de Baloncesto and third division in Spain. It is also named Adecco Plata for sponsorship reasons.

== Competition format ==
Teams will play a regular season of 26 weeks with a Round-robin tournament format. This regular season will start on October 8 and will finish on April 20. The regular season champion will promote directly to LEB Oro and the last qualified will be relegated to Liga EBA. Teams qualified from second to ninth will join the promotion playoffs. The winner will promote also to LEB Oro.

The two first qualified teams after the first half of the league will play the Copa LEB Plata.

=== Eligibility of players ===
All teams must have in their roster:

- A minimum of seven players who played in Spain during three season being between 15 and 20 years old.
- A maximum of two non-EU players. This players can be replaced by players from the EU or ACP countries.
- A maximum of two players from the EU or ACP countries.

Teams can not sign any player after February 29, 2012.

== Team information ==
Champion of last season Knet Rioja and playoffs winner Iberostar Bàsquet Mallorca were promoted to LEB Oro. Fundación Adepal Alcázar and Aguas de Sousas Ourense were relegated from LEB Oro to LEB Plata. Adepal resigned to its spot and was dissolved.

Aurteneche Maquinaria, Gandía Bàsquet, Platja de Palma and Eninter CB Santfeliuenc were the Liga EBA playoffs winners and promoted to LEB Plata, but Palma and Santfeliuenc refused to play in this league and stayed in Liga EBA. Lan Mobel ISB was also relegated to Liga EBA from LEB Plata.

By July 12, only seven teams were confirmed to play in LEB Plata. These teams were Aguas de Sousas Ourense (relegated from LEB Oro), River Andorra, CB Prat, Fontedoso Carrefour El Bulevar de Ávila, FC Barcelona Regal B, Aurteneche Maquinaria (champion of last Liga EBA) and Tenerife Baloncesto (achieved one of the vacants).

The Spanish Basketball Federation conceded an extension of the July 28 deadline for nine more teams. At this date, four more teams were admitted: Gandía Bàsquet, Leyma Natura Básquet Coruña, Lan Mobel ISB and CB Las Rozas, who played last season in 1ª División (fifth tier, one below Liga EBA).

Some teams demanded a new extension to get the endorsement, and the Federation conceded it until August 10. Oviedo CB and Plasencia Extremadura were admitted after this last extension.

Team	City	Arena	Founded	Coach
Aguas de Sousas Ourense	Ourense	Pazo dos Deportes Paco Paz	1979	(Spain) Rafa Sanz
Aurteneche Maquinaria Araba/Álava	Vitoria-Gasteiz	Polideportivo Mendizorroza	1994	(Spain) Iñaki Merino
CB Prat Joventut	El Prat de Llobregat	Pavelló Joan Busquets	1951	(Spain) Carles Durán
FC Barcelona Regal B	Barcelona	Palau Blaugrana	1926	(Spain) Borja Comenge
Fontedoso Carrefour El Bulevar de Ávila	Ávila	Multiusos Carlos Sastre	2001	(Spain) Armando Gómez
Gandía Bàsquet	Gandia	Pavelló Municipal de Gandia	1981	(Spain) Víctor Rubio
Lan Mobel ISB	Azpeitia	Polideportivo Municipal	1975	(Spain) Iurgi Caminos
Leyma Natura Básquet Coruña	A Coruña	Polideportivo de Riazor	1995	(Spain) Antonio Pérez
Omnia CB Las Rozas	Las Rozas de Madrid	Polideportivo Las Matas	1987	(Spain) Alonso de Madariaga
Oviedo CB	Oviedo	Polideportivo de Pumarín	2004	(Spain) Alfredo Riera
Plasencia Extremadura	Plasencia	Pabellón Ciudad de Plasencia	1978	(Spain) Rafa Gomáriz
River Andorra	Andorra La Vella	Poliesportiu d'Andorra	1970	(Spain) Joan Peñarroya
Tenerife Baloncesto	Santa Cruz de Tenerife	Polideportivo Municipal	1996	(Spain) Jou Costa

== Regular season ==
=== League table ===
#	Teams	P	W	L	PF	PA	PT	Qualification or relegation
1	River Andorra	24	19	5	1825	1578	44	Promotion to LEB Oro
2	Aguas de Sousas Ourense	24	17	7	1764	1663	41	Promotion playoffs
3	CB Prat Joventut	24	15	9	1810	1694	39	Promotion playoffs
4	Omnia CB Las Rozas	24	15	9	1845	1763	39	Promotion playoffs
5	Leyma Natura Básquet Coruña	24	13	11	1683	1576	37	Promotion playoffs
6	Aurteneche Maquinaria Araba/Álava (C)	24	13	11	1748	1734	37	Promotion playoffs
7	FC Barcelona Regal B	24	12	12	1856	1845	36	Promotion playoffs
8	Fontedoso Carrefour El Bulevar de Ávila	24	12	12	1589	1605	36	Promotion playoffs
9	Lan Mobel ISB	24	12	12	1751	1747	36	Promotion playoffs
10	Oviedo CB	24	8	16	1724	1888	32	
11	Plasencia Extremadura	24	8	16	1629	1752	32	
12	Tenerife Baloncesto	24	7	17	1764	1849	31	
13	Gandía Bàsquet	24	5	19	1564	1858	29	Relegation to Liga EBA

Source: FEB
(C) = Copa LEB Plata champion

=== Results ===
	COB	ARA	PRAT	FCB	AVI	GAN	ISB	COR	ROZ	OCB	PLA	BCA	TF
Aguas de Sousas Ourense		68–62	62–52	79–69	69–51	75–81	74–62	67–66	88–70	75–58	76–61	82–66	68–57
Aurteneche Maquinaria Araba/Álava	81–76		84–64	80–92	79–74	78–57	71–82	79–81	80–91	77–65	77–74	69–81	70–78
CB Prat Joventut	71–70	69–74		77–76	64–81	89–67	82–70	71–67	90–75	101–53	78–68	75–70	85–70
FC Barcelona Regal B	72–77	52–64	88–93		74–64	89–71	94–82	82–65	82–66	75–81	79–72	93–88	89–79
Fontedoso Carrefour El Bulevar de Ávila	69–56	48–47	62–78	76–62		73–51	75–70	61–53	74–77	68–57	70–60	56–54	70–79
Gandía Bàsquet	73–83	66–65	62–90	61–69	51–65		49–69	62–69	72–80	69–74	78–61	52–78	63–61
Lan Mobel ISB	84–70	81–84	73–66	78–80	66–53	89–69		58–71	76–64	82–78	82–89	73–83	78–73
Leyma Natura Básquet Coruña	66–75	72–48	68–65	66–61	81–57	84–60	54–62		68–76	91–71	89–58	52–65	81–60
Omnia CB Las Rozas	71–78	76–79	75–61	93–66	73–64	85–69	76–57	64–61		86–67	80–81	74–83	89–86
Oviedo CB	74–80	76–82	59–80	83–79	79–67	64–69	78–66	86–82	72–82		79–54	63–78	101–105
Plasencia Extremadura	77–68	68–77	62–69	67–74	75–59	84–71	68–63	54–67	62–75	76–55		58–71	75–57
River Andorra	91–53	76–73	83–70	78–63	77–72	87–66	67–70	66–48	76–72	81–51	76–65		72–60
Tenerife Baloncesto	80–85	67–68	75–70	91–80	73–80	81–55	73–78	65–81	71–75	73–98	82–60	68–78	

Source: FEB

== Promotion playoffs ==
The playoffs will start on 24 April 2012, and it will finish on May 23, 25 or 27 if necessary.

The quarterfinal round will be played in a best-of-three games format, with the best ranked team playing games 1 and 3 if necessary at home. Semifinals and finals will be played in a best-of-5 games format, with the seeded playing the games 1, 2 and 5 if necessary at home. The winner of the playoffs will promote to 2012–2013 LEB Oro season with River Andorra, the champion of the regular season.

Quarterfinals; April 24, 27, 29
2	Aguas de Sousas Ourense	86	66	83
9	Lan Mobel ISB	87	59	69
5	Leyma Natura Básquet Coruña	89	66	X
6	Aurteneche Maquinaria Araba/Álava	92	69	X
3	CB Prat Joventut	78	62	X
8	Fontedoso Carrefour El Bulevar de Ávila	62	57	X
4	Omnia CB Las Rozas	75	72	X
7	FC Barcelona Regal B	79	86	X

Semifinals; May 4, 6, 9, 11, 13
2	Aguas de Sousas Ourense	69	94	61	63	79
6	Aurteneche Maquinaria Araba/Álava	59	92	75	70	65
3	CB Prat Joventut	80	72	81	83	X
7	FC Barcelona Regal B	74	81	77	79	X

Finals; May 18, 20, 23, 25, 27
2	Aguas de Sousas Ourense	76	64	67	88	X
3	CB Prat Joventut	65	52	80	69	X

== Copa LEB Plata ==
At the half of the league, the two first teams in the table play the Copa LEB Plata at home of the winner of the first half season (13th round). If this team doesn't want to host the Copa LEB Plata, the second qualified can do it. If nobody wants to host it, the Federation will propose a neutral venue.

The Champion of this Cup will play the play-offs as first qualified if it finishes the league between the 2nd and the 5th qualified. The Copa LEB Plata will be played on January 29, 2012.

=== Teams qualified ===
#	Teams	P	W	L	PF	PA	PT
1	River Andorra	12	10	2	901	730	22
2	Aurteneche Maquinaria Araba/Álava	12	8	4	887	849	20

=== The game ===
Andorra Televisió

29 Jan 2012
18:00 CET

Report
Stats

River Andorra	74–82	Aurteneche Maquinaria Araba/Álava
Scoring by quarter: 10–22, 22–23, 14–13, 28–24
Pts: Fede Bavosi, 25; Rebs: Pablo Sánchez, 10; Asts: Fede Bavosi, 5 PIR: Fede Bavosi, 32		Pts: Alberto Ausina, 19; Rebs: Alex Thompson, 14; Asts: Ander Ortiz de Pinedo, 5 PIR: Alberto Ausina, 30
Aurteneche Maquinaria Araba/Álava, champion of the XII Copa LEB Plata

Poliesportiu d'Andorra, Andorra la Vella
Attendance: 1,800
Referees: Martínez Prada, Jerez Vázquez, Pinela García

== Awards ==
=== All LEB Plata team ===
Team made after the playoffs.

- (Spain) Ander Ortiz de Pinedo (Aurteneche Maquinaria Araba/Álava)
- (United States) Kyle Hill (Aguas de Sousas Ourense)
- (Sweden) Marcus Eriksson (FC Barcelona Regal B)
- (Spain) Javier Salsón (Omnia CB Las Rozas)
- (Montenegro) Marko Todorović (CB Prat Joventut)

=== Regular season MVP ===
- Marko Todorović – CB Prat Joventut

=== MVP week by week ===
==== Regular season ====
Day	Name	Team	PIR
1	(United States) Sammy Monroe	Tenerife Baloncesto	45
2	(Spain) Alberto Ausina	Aurteneche Maquinaria Araba/Álava	26
3	(Spain) José María Balmón	Omnia CB Las Rozas	26
3	(United States) Alfredo Ott	Lan Mobel ISB	26
4	(United States) Alex Thompson	Aurteneche Maquinaria Araba/Álava (2)	35
5	(United States) Kim Adams	Leyma Natura Básquet Coruña	27
6	(Spain) Alberto Ausina (2)	Aurteneche Maquinaria Araba/Álava (3)	35
7	(United States) Sammy Monroe (2)	Tenerife Baloncesto (2)	36
8	(Spain) Isma Torres	River Andorra	28
9	(Cuba) Georvys Elías	Tenerife Baloncesto (3)	29
10	(Spain) Javier Salsón	Omnia CB Las Rozas (2)	29
11	(Haiti) Robert Joseph	Fontedoso Carrefour El Bulevar de Ávila	27
12	(Nigeria) Ola Atoyebi	Lan Mobel ISB	33
13	(Senegal) Papa Mbaye	FC Barcelona Regal B	25
14	(Spain) Nacho Guigou	Tenerife Baloncesto (4)	33
15	(Spain) Toni Vicens	Aguas de Sousas Ourense	28
16	(Spain) Adrián Laso	Fontedoso Carrefour El Bulevar de Ávila (2)	21
17	(Nigeria) Ola Atoyebi (2)	Lan Mobel ISB (3)	30
17	(Spain) José María Balmón (2)	Omnia CB Las Rozas (3)	30
18	(Spain) Alberto Ausina (3)	Aurteneche Maquinaria Araba/Álava (4)	29
19	(Spain) Javier Salsón (2)	Omnia CB Las Rozas (4)	33
20	(Spain) Ander Ortiz de Pinedo	Aurteneche Maquinaria Araba/Álava (5)	25
21	(Spain) Alberto Ausina (4)	Aurteneche Maquinaria Araba/Álava (6)	40
22	(United States) Alfredo Ott (2)	Lan Mobel ISB (4)	34
23	(United States) Nick Wolf	Omnia CB Las Rozas (5)	38
24	(United States) Bryan LeDuc	Oviedo CB	32
25	(Spain) Javier Salsón (3)	Omnia CB Las Rozas (6)	28
25	(United States) Nick Wolf (2)	Omnia CB Las Rozas (7)	28
26	(Spain) David Ortega	Oviedo CB (2)	32

==== Playoffs ====
Day	Name	Team	PIR
QF1	(Spain) Ander Ortiz de Pinedo (2)	Aurteneche Maquinaria Araba/Álava (7)	29
QF2	(Spain) Javier Salsón (4)	Omnia CB Las Rozas (8)	41
QF3	(Spain) Víctor Serrano	Lan Mobel ISB (5)	20
SF1	(Spain) Álex Barrera	CB Prat Joventut	23
SF2	(Spain) Alberto Ausina (5)	Aurteneche Maquinaria Araba/Álava (8)	26
SF3	(Montenegro) Marko Todorović	CB Prat Joventut (2)	40
SF4	(Spain) Ander Ortiz de Pinedo (3)	Aurteneche Maquinaria Araba/Álava (9)	25
SF5	(United States) Matt Webster	Aguas de Sousas Ourense (2)	31
F1	(Montenegro) Marko Todorović (2)	CB Prat Joventut (3)	21
F2	(Spain) Albert Ventura	CB Prat Joventut (4)	17
F3	(Spain) Ferran Bassas	CB Prat Joventut (5)	20
F4	(Spain) Albert Ventura	CB Prat Joventut (6)	17
F4	(Ivory Coast) Francis Koffi	Aguas de Sousas Ourense (3)	17
F4	(Spain) Alberto Miguel	Aguas de Sousas Ourense (4)	17
F4	(Spain) Pablo Movilla	Aguas de Sousas Ourense (5)	17
