= 2013–14 LEB Oro season =

- League: LEB Oro
- Sport: Basketball
- Games: 182 (regular season)
- Teams: 14

Regular Season
- Season champions: River Andorra MoraBanc
- Season MVP: (Spain) Jordi Trias

Playoffs
- Playoffs champions: Ford Burgos
- Playoffs runners-up: Quesos Cerrato Palencia

Copa Príncipe
- Champions: River Andorra MoraBanc
- Runners-up: Quesos Cerrato Palencia
- Finals MVP: (Spain) Jordi Trias

LEB Oro seasons
- ← 2012–13 2014–15 →

The 2013–14 LEB Oro season was the 18th season of the Liga Española de Baloncesto, a Spanish basketball league. It was named Adecco Oro as its sponsored identity. The champion of the regular season, River Andorra MoraBanc was promoted to Liga ACB. The teams between second and ninth position joined the promotion play off, where the winner, Ford Burgos was promoted too to the higher division.

== Competition format ==
=== Regular season ===
The regular season was played by round-robin system.

After the first leg of the season, the two top qualified teams played the Copa Príncipe de Asturias and the leader will be the host team.

At the final of the season:

- The regular season winner promoted directly to Liga ACB.
- Teams qualified between 2nd and 9th, joined the promotion play-offs to ACB.
- Teams qualified in positions 12th and 13th would play the relegation playoffs.
- Team qualified in last position is relegated directly to LEB Plata.

On November 7, after five games played, the Spanish Basketball Federation, in agreement with the clubs of the league, decided to change the competition format:

- Teams in positions 13th and 14th would be relegated directly, instead the relegation playoffs between 12th and 13th
- Quarterfinals were reduced to a best-of-three games format.

== Team information and location ==
New teams in the league

- Unión Financiera Baloncesto Oviedo (champion of LEB Plata)
- Clínicas Rincón (achieved a vacant berth in the league)

Teams that left the league

- Lucentum Alicante (will play in 1ª División, fifth tier)
- Cáceres Patrimonio de la Humanidad (registered in LEB Plata)

Also, CB Atapuerca was dissolved and substituted by CB Tizona. It will have the same sponsorship name: Ford Burgos.

Location of teams in 2013–14 LEB Oro

Team	City	Arena	Capacity	Head coach
Club Melilla Baloncesto	Melilla	Pabellón Javier Imbroda Ortiz	3,800	(Spain) Rubén Perelló
Cocinas.com	Logroño	Palacio de los Deportes	3,851	(Spain) Jesús Sala
FC Barcelona B	Barcelona	Palau Blaugrana	7,500	(Spain) Aleix Duran
Força Lleida CE	Lleida	Pavelló Barris Nord	6,100	(Spain) Joaquín Prado
Ford Burgos	Burgos	Polideportivo El Plantío	3,150	(Spain) Andreu Casadevall
Instituto Fertilidad Clínicas Rincón	Málaga	Ciudad Deportiva de Carranque	1,500	(Spain) Francis Tomé
Leyma Natura Básquet Coruña	A Coruña	Polideportivo de Riazor	3,500	(Spain) Antonio Pérez
Ourense Termal	Ourense	Pazo dos Deportes Paco Paz	5,000	(Spain) Gonzalo García de Vitoria
Peñas Huesca	Huesca	Palacio Municipal de Huesca	5,018	(Spain) Quim Costa
Planasa Navarra	Pamplona	Polideportivo Anaitasuna	3,000	(Spain) Sergio Lamúa
Quesos Cerrato Palencia	Palencia	Pabellón Marta Domínguez	1,806	(Spain) Natxo Lezkano
Ribeira Sacra Breogán Lugo	Lugo	Pazo Provincial Dos Deportes	6,500	(Spain) Lisardo Gómez
River Andorra MoraBanc	Andorra La Vella	Poliesportiu d'Andorra	1,784	(Spain) Joan Peñarroya
Unión Financiera Baloncesto Oviedo	Oviedo	Polideportivo de Pumarín	800	(Spain) Guillermo Arenas

=== Managerial changes during the season ===
Team	Outgoing manager	Manner of departure	Date of vacancy	Replaced by	Date of appointment	Position in table
Planasa Navarra	(Spain) Ángel Jareño	Sacked	27 December 2013	(Spain) Sergio Lamúa	27 December 2013	13th (3–9)

== Regular season ==
=== League table ===
Pos	Team	Pld	W	L	PF	PA	PD	Pts	Qualification or relegation
1	River Andorra MoraBanc (C)	26	21	5	2207	1907	+300	47	Promotion to Liga ACB
2	Quesos Cerrato Palencia	26	20	6	1918	1773	+145	46	Promotion playoffs
3	Ford Burgos	26	19	7	2086	1869	+217	45	Promotion playoffs
4	Ribeira Sacra Breogán Lugo	26	18	8	1973	1819	+154	44	Promotion playoffs
5	Leyma Natura Básquet Coruña	26	14	12	1895	1895	0	40	Promotion playoffs
6	Unión Financiera Baloncesto Oviedo	26	14	12	2038	2035	+3	40	Promotion playoffs
7	Peñas Huesca	26	13	13	1874	1842	+32	39	Promotion playoffs
8	Cocinas.com	26	13	13	1962	1997	−35	39	Promotion playoffs
9	Instituto Fertilidad Clínicas Rincón	26	11	15	1814	1878	−64	37	Promotion playoffs
10	Força Lleida CE	26	11	15	1970	1988	−18	37	
11	Club Melilla Baloncesto	26	10	16	1880	1942	−62	36	
12	Ourense Termal	26	8	18	1811	1906	−95	34	
13	FC Barcelona B	26	5	21	1702	1977	−275	31	Relegation to LEB Plata
14	Planasa Navarra	26	5	21	1789	2091	−302	31	Relegation to LEB Plata

(C): indicates Copa Príncipe champion.

=== Results ===
	MEL	COC	FCB	LLE	BUR	RIN	COR	COB	PEÑ	NAV	PAL	BRE	AND	OVI
Club Melilla Baloncesto		82–85	74–67	77–65	95–89	70–66	81–67	65–50	57–62	75–71	71–81	72–82	71–93	81–75
Cocinas.com	83–76		74–66	82–73	68–83	78–68	80–58	81–94	97–82	70–54	69–72	82–81	56–109	98–82
FC Barcelona B	68–63	52–74		61–69	63–92	75–71	66–72	55–61	65–69	81–72	64–76	55–71	80–77	75–83
Força Lleida CE	87–66	78–60	84–70		72–79	73–79	76–84	73–65	95–91	85–78	77–81	85–77	94–99	93–81
Ford Burgos	73–64	75–80	95–62	82–81		81–67	78–85	69–61	77–72	79–53	77–79	89–76	91–84	99–73
Instituto Fertilidad Clínicas Rincón	69–68	82–74	69–57	66–52	67–77		61–63	57–80	75–66	76–66	63–73	61–77	87–91	72–68
Leyma Natura Básquet Coruña	80–79	83–79	89–62	82–71	53–81	72–77		71–75	69–63	65–66	63–70	88–83	88–74	69–66
Ourense Termal	75–77	67–71	61–59	73–80	74–75	61–68	50–58		63–67	81–76	59–80	60–62	72–85	81–67
Peñas Huesca	71–69	85–62	100–64	78–59	69–75	76–51	76–74	73–65		75–49	58–74	61–77	73–95	66–71
Planasa Navarra	68–80	96–83	72–77	77–84	70–80	57–63	71–67	82–88	70–81		68–72	79–75	70–93	88–84
Quesos Cerrato Palencia	62–54	65–59	65–64	57–52	74–63	83–81	66–63	74–72	73–68	90–47		73–77	84–87	69–72
Ribeira Sacra Breogán Lugo	82–63	77–71	70–65	77–64	72–63	81–75	60–63	89–68	57–50	93–59	92–81		74–77	76–70
River Andorra MoraBanc	86–76	82–71	80–61	80–74	81–73	88–77	79–62	84–54	83–58	95–60	71–68	65–69		90–83
Unión Financiera Baloncesto Oviedo	86–74	76–75	94–68	86–74	74–91	71–66	80–78	78–77	76–84	99–70	82–76	80–66	81–79	

== Copa Príncipe de Asturias ==
At the half of the league, the two first teams in the table play the Copa Príncipe de Asturias at home of the winner of the first half season (13th round). If this team doesn't want to host the Copa Príncipe, the second qualified can do it. If nobody wants to host it, the Federation will propose a neutral venue.

The Champion of this Cup will play the play-offs as first qualified if it finishes the league between the 2nd and the 5th qualified. The Copa Príncipe will be played on January 31, 2014.

=== Teams qualified ===
Pos	Team	Pld	W	L	PF	PA	PD	Pts
1	River Andorra MoraBanc	13	10	3	1100	938	+162	23
2	Quesos Cerrato Palencia	13	10	3	952	839	+113	23

=== The game ===
31 January 2014
21:00

Report
Stats

River Andorra MoraBanc	77–61	Quesos Cerrato Palencia
Scoring by quarter: 14–21, 19–5, 21–20, 23–15
Pts: Blanch, E. Sánchez, 16; Rebs: Trias 20; Asts: Navarro 3 PIR: Trias 28		Pts: Otegui 19; Rebs: Otegui, Rejón 8 Asts: Rejón 2 PIR: Otegui 25
River Andorra MoraBanc, champion of the 2014 Copa Príncipe de Asturias

Poliesportiu d'Andorra, Andorra La Vella
Referees: Morales Ruiz, Pazos Pazos, González Zumajo

== Playoffs ==
Quarterfinals
2	Quesos Cerrato Palencia	62	74	X
9	Instituto Fertilidad Clínicas Rincón	61	60	X
5	Leyma Natura Básquet Coruña	64	67	X
6	Unión Financiera Baloncesto Oviedo	70	76	X
3	Ford Burgos	91	84	X
8	Cocinas.com	70	70	X
4	Ribeira Sacra Breogán Lugo	69	65	80
7	Peñas Huesca	64	73	66

Semifinals
2	Quesos Cerrato Palencia	87	69	76	63	X
6	Unión Financiera Baloncesto Oviedo	47	65	79	51	X
3	Ford Burgos	68	94	80	X	X
4	Ribeira Sacra Breogán Lugo	64	54	58	X	X

Finals
2	Quesos Cerrato Palencia	77	64	64	60	X
3	Ford Burgos	62	69	73	78	X

== Final standings ==
Pos.	Team	GP	W	L	Qualification or relegation
1	River Andorra MoraBanc	26	21	5	Promoted to Liga ACB
2	Ford Burgos	35	27	8	Promoted to Liga ACB
3	Quesos Cerrato Palencia	36	26	10	
4	Ribeira Sacra Breogán Lugo	32	20	12	
5	Unión Financiera Baloncesto Oviedo	32	17	15	
6	Leyma Natura Básquet Coruña	28	14	14	
7	Peñas Huesca	29	14	15	
8	Cocinas.com	28	13	15	
9	Instituto Fertilidad Clínicas Rincón	28	11	17	
10	Força Lleida CE	26	11	15	
11	Club Melilla Baloncesto	26	10	16	
12	Ourense Termal	26	8	18	
13	FC Barcelona B	26	5	21	Relegated to LEB Plata
14	Planasa Navarra	26	5	21	Relegated to LEB Plata

== Stats leaders in regular season ==
=== Points ===
Rk	Name	Team	Games	Points	PPG
1	(Spain) Richi Guillén	Instituto Fertilidad Clínicas Rincón	25	400	16.0
2	(Spain) Pierre Oriola	Peñas Huesca	26	391	15.0
3	(Bosnia and Herzegovina) Dejan Todorović	Instituto Fertilidad Clínicas Rincón	21	313	14.9
4	(Spain) Marc Blanch	River Andorra MoraBanc	26	380	14.6
5	(Spain) Jordi Trias	River Andorra MoraBanc	26	372	14.3

=== Rebounds ===
Rk	Name	Team	Games	Rebounds	RPG
1	(Spain) Jordi Trias	River Andorra MoraBanc	26	234	9.0
2	(Spain) Pep Ortega	Ford Burgos	25	214	8.5
3	(Spain) David Mesa	Planasa Navarra	25	189	7.5
4	(Ivory Coast) Jonathan Kale	Ourense Termal	26	196	7.5
5	(Senegal) Michel Diouf	Ribeira Sacra Breogán Lugo	26	191	7.3

=== Assists ===
Rk	Name	Team	Games	Assists	APG
1	(Spain) Mikel Úriz	Cocinas.com	26	128	4.9
2	(Austria) Thomas Schreiner	River Andorra MoraBanc	17	79	4.6
3	(Spain) Fran Cárdenas	Unión Financiera Baloncesto Oviedo	25	115	4.6
4	(Spain) Sergio Llorente	Força Lleida	26	105	4.0
5	(Spain) Albert Sàbat	Ford Burgos	26	96	3.7

=== Performance Index Rating ===
Rk	Name	Team	Games	Rating	PIR
1	(Spain) Jordi Trias	River Andorra MoraBanc	26	626	24.1
2	(Spain) Pep Ortega	Ford Burgos	25	496	19.8
3	(Spain) Richi Guillén	Instituto Fertilidad Clínicas Rincón	25	490	19.6
4	(Senegal) Michel Diouf	Ribeira Sacra Breogán Lugo	26	480	18.4
5	(Spain) Pierre Oriola	Peñas Huesca	26	395	15.2

== Awards and trophies ==
=== All LEB Oro team ===
The all LEB Oro team was selected after the end of the regular season.

- (Spain) Fran Cárdenas (Unión Financiera Baloncesto Oviedo)
- (Lithuania) Marius Grigonis (Peñas Huesca)
- (Spain) Marc Blanch (River Andorra MoraBanc)
- (Spain) Pep Ortega (Ford Burgos)
- (Spain) Jordi Trias (River Andorra MoraBanc)

=== MVP of the regular season ===
- (Spain) Jordi Trias (River Andorra MoraBanc)

=== Coach of the season ===
- (Spain) Joan Peñarroya (River Andorra MoraBanc)

=== MVP week by week ===
Day	Name	Team	PIR
1	(Spain) Albert Sàbat	Ford Burgos	30
2	(Spain) Chus Castro	Leyma Natura Básquet Coruña	38
3	(Spain) Jordi Trias	River Andorra MoraBanc	39
4	(United States) Jason Cain (Dominican Republic) Juan José García	Leyma Natura Básquet Coruña; Unión Financiera Oviedo Baloncesto	27
5	(Spain) Roberto Morentin	Ourense Termal	24
6	(United States) Daniel Fitzgerald	Unión Financiera Oviedo Baloncesto	28
7	(Spain) Jordi Trias (2)	River Andorra MoraBanc	40
8	(Spain) Urko Otegui	Quesos Cerrato Palencia	26
9	(Spain) Jordi Trias (3)	River Andorra MoraBanc	33
10	(Spain) Pep Ortega	Ford Burgos	34
11	(Spain) Jordi Trias (4)	River Andorra MoraBanc	40
12	(Spain) Pep Ortega (2)	Ford Burgos	31
13	(Spain) Pierre Oriola	Peñas Huesca	33
14	(Senegal) Michel Diouf (Spain) Ricardo Guillén (Spain) Jordi Trias (5)	Ribeira Sacra Breogán Lugo; Instituto Fertilidad Clínicas Rincón; River Andorra MoraBanc	33
15	(Spain) Héctor Manzano	Club Melilla Baloncesto	41
16	(United States) Alex Hall	Cocinas.com	28
17	(Spain) Pierre Oriola (2)	Peñas Huesca	35
18	(Spain) Jordi Trias (6)	River Andorra MoraBanc	40
19	(Senegal) Michel Diouf (2)	Ribeira Sacra Breogán Lugo	29
20	(Spain) Ricardo Guillén (2)	Instituto Fertilidad Clínicas Rincón	27
21	(Spain) Marc Blanch (Netherlands) Roeland Schaftenaar	River Andorra MoraBanc; Ribeira Sacra Breogán Lugo	37
22	(Spain) Javi Lucas	Leyma Natura Básquet Coruña	37
23	(Spain) Álex Llorca	Força Lleida CE	29
24	(Spain) Víctor Arteaga	Força Lleida CE	34
25	(Spain) Ricardo Guillén (3)	Instituto Fertilidad Clínicas Rincón	34
26	(Spain) Víctor Arteaga (2)	Força Lleida CE	31
QF1	(Spain) Pep Ortega (3)	Ford Burgos	31
QF2	(Spain) Urko Otegui (2)	Quesos Cerrato Palencia	29

== See also ==
- 2013–14 ACB season
- 2013–14 LEB Plata season
