= Volodymyr Gerun =

Ukrainian basketball player

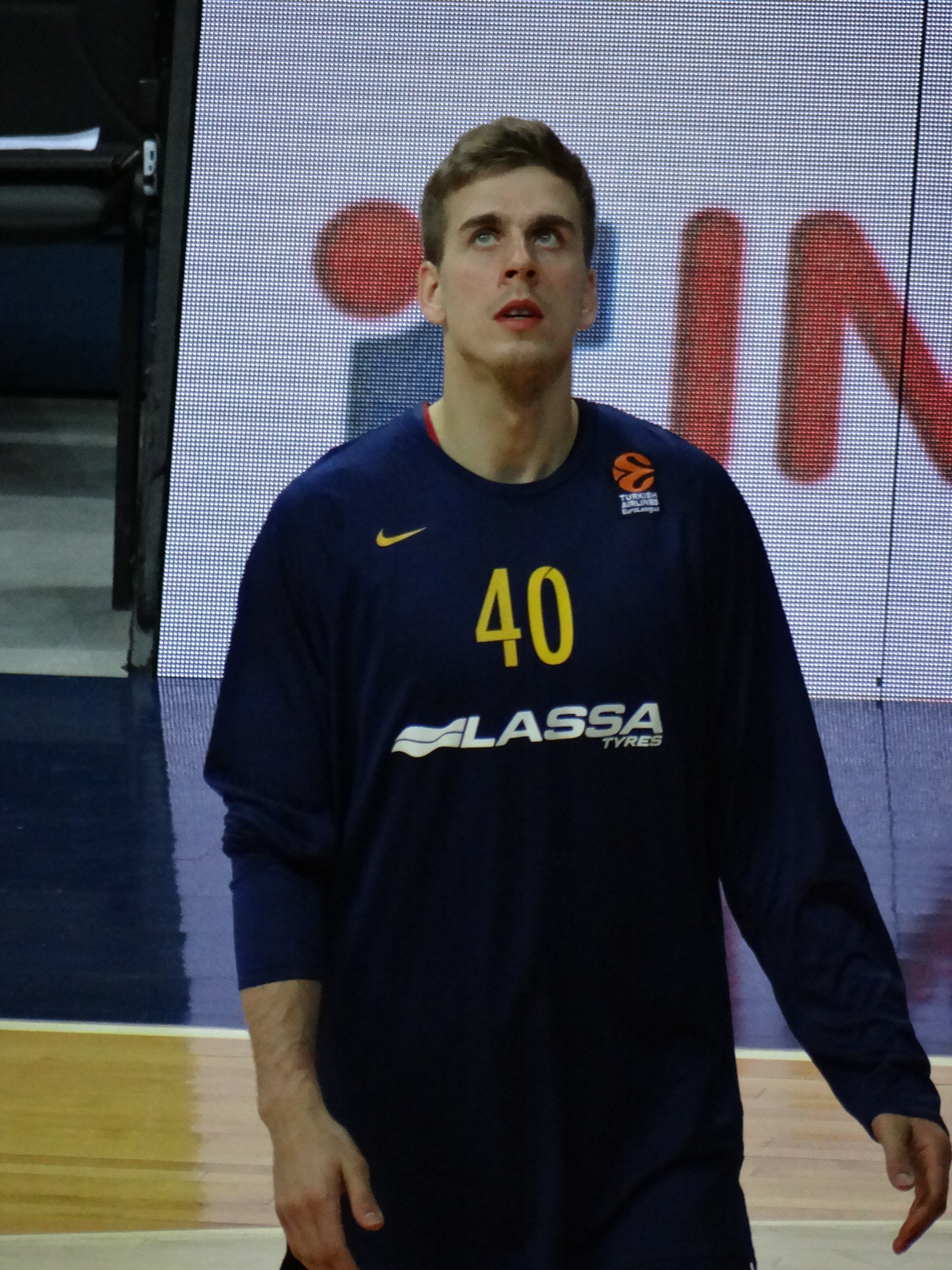

No. 52 – Osaka Evessa
- Position: Power forward / center
- League: B.League

Personal information
- Born: 25 March 1994 (age 32) Dnipropetrovsk, Ukraine
- Listed height: 2.10 m (6 ft 11 in)
- Listed weight: 250 lb (113 kg)

Career information
- College: West Virginia (2012–2013); Portland (2013–2015)
- Playing career: 2011–present

Career history
- 2011–2012: BC Dnipro
- 2015: Baloncesto Fuenlabrada
- 2015–2016: Força Lleida CE
- 2016–2017: CB Clavijo
- 2017–2018: FC Barcelona Bàsquet B
- 2018–2019: CB Breogán
- 2019–2021: Baloncesto Málaga
- 2021–2022: Büyükçekmece Basketbol
- 2022–2023: Real Betis
- 2023–2024: Sendai 89ers
- 2024–present: Osaka Evessa

Career highlights
- 2018–19 LEB Oro season - best offensive rebounder

Volodymyr Gerun (Ukrainian: Володимир Герун; born 25 March 1994) is a Ukrainian professional basketball player for Osaka Evessa of the B.League.

== Playing career ==
Gerun started out with his home town club BC Dnipro for the 2011–12 Ukrainian Basketball SuperLeague season.

At age 18, Volodymyr Gerun left his native country Ukraine for the USA-based NCAA Division I.

After his tenure in the United States, he returned to Europe. In Spain, he progressively climbed the steps from LEB Plata until he reached the Liga ACB.

In 2015, he joined CB Getafe, a subsidiary of Baloncesto Fuenlabrada, from which he moved to Força Lleida CE of the LEB Oro, then CB Clavijo. His good performances in both clubs aroused the interest of Barcelona, which incorporated him into their subsidiary FC Barcelona Bàsquet B for the 2017–18 LEB Oro season.

In 2017–18, he played 30 games in which he averaged about 29 minutes, 14.8 points, 8 rebounds, 1.6 assists and 5 fouls received. He was voted best player of the day on several occasions.

In July 2018, he signed with CB Breogán for one year. He became the first signing made official by Breogán. During the 2018–19 ACB season, he averaged 11.4 points (59% in shots of two and 62% in free throws) and 6.6 rebounds. Against his later team Baloncesto Málaga, he recorded a noteworthy 11 offensive rebounds in both matchups combined.

Gerun signed with Baloncesto Málaga for the 2019–20 ACB season, alongside Deon Thompson. Gerun signed for three seasons, although with cut-off clauses for both parties. Gerun, Thompson and Rubén Guerrero came as replacements for inside players Viny Okouo, Mathias Lessort and Giorgi Shermadini. Gerun, Thompson and Guerrero played under head coach Luis Casimiro in that season.

On August 17, 2021, he has signed with Büyükçekmece Basketbol of the Turkish Basketbol Süper Ligi.

On July 14, 2022, he has signed with Real Betis of the Liga ACB.

On July 26, 2023, Gerun signed with Sendai 89ers of the Japanese B.League.

== National team ==
Gerun has been a member of the Ukrainian national basketball team at senior level as well as at the junior levels under-18 and under-16.
