= CB Tartessos =

- Nickname: Unibasket
- Leagues: LEB Plata
- Founded: 1993
- Dissolved: 2010
- Arena: Palacio Deportes de Chapín
- Location: Jerez de la Frontera, Spain
- Team colors: Blue
- President: (Spain) Jesús Torres
- Head coach: (Spain) Toa Paterna
- Website: www.unibasket.es
| Home | Away |

Club Basket Tartessos, more commonly referred to today by its sponsorship name of Canasta Unibasket Jerez, is a professional Basketball team based in Jerez de la Frontera, Andalusia. The team was dissolved in 2010 due to financial problems.

== Season by season ==
| Season | Tier | Division | Pos. | W–L |
|---|---|---|---|---|
| 2004–05 | 4 | Liga EBA | 3rd | 20–12 |
| 2005–06 | 4 | Liga EBA | 2nd | 24–8 |
| 2006–07 | 4 | Liga EBA | 4th (Note: Joined the newly created LEB Bronce.) | 16–10 |
| 2007–08 | 4 | LEB Bronce | 2nd | 21–14 |
| 2008–09 | 3 | LEB Plata | 8th (Note: Resigned to its place in LEB Plata.) | 18–16 |
| 2009–10 | 4 | Liga EBA | 1st | 29–5 |
