= CB Las Rozas =

Spanish basketball club

Club Baloncesto Las Rozas
- Leagues: LEB Plata
- Founded: 1987
- Arena: Polideportivo Las Matas (Capacity: 2,000)
- Location: Las Rozas de Madrid, Spain
- Team colors: Navy and white
- President: Rafael de Asís
- Head coach: Alonso de Madariaga
- Website: cblr.es
| Home | Away |

Club Baloncesto Las Rozas is a basketball team based in Las Rozas de Madrid, Spain.

== History ==
It was founded in 1987. In July 2011, the team achieved one of the vacant berths in LEB Plata.

== Season by season ==
| Season | Tier | Division | Pos. | W–L |
|---|---|---|---|---|
| 1987–88 | 3 | 2ª División | | |
| 1988–89 | 3 | 2ª División | | |
| 1989–90 | 2 | 1ª División B | 15th | 6–24 |
| 1990–91 | 3 | 2ª División | | |
| 1991–92 | 3 | 2ª División | 2nd | |
| 1992–93 | 2 | 1ª División | 11th | 15–23 |
| 1993–94 | 2 | 1ª División | 14th | 11–19 |
| 1994–95 | 2 | Liga EBA | 5th | 16–10 |
| 1995–96 | 2 | Liga EBA | 9th | |
| 1996–97 | 3 | Liga EBA | 7th | |
| 1997–98 | 3 | Liga EBA | 10th (Note: Resigned to continue playing in Liga EBA.) | 8–14 |
| 1998–04 | Lower divisions | | | |
| 2004–05 | 5 | 1ª División | | |
| 2005–06 | 5 | 1ª División | 7th | 15–11 |
| 2006–07 | 5 | 1ª División | 5th | 16–9 |
| 2007–08 | 6 | 1ª División | 3rd | 24–9 |
| 2008–09 | 6 | 1ª División | 21st | 8–20 |
| 2009–10 | 5 | 1ª División | 16th | 9–15 |
| 2010–11 | 5 | 1ª División | 21st (Note: Achieved one of the vacant berths in LEB Plata.) | 11–17 |
| 2011–12 | 3 | LEB Plata | 6th (Note: Resigned to its berth in LEB Plata.) | 15–11 |
| 2012–13 | 5 | 1ª División | 16th | 11–13 |
| 2013–14 | 5 | 1ª División | 13th | 10–14 |
| 2014–15 | 5 | 1ª División | 12th | 13–12 |
| 2015–16 | 5 | 1ª División | 16th | 8–16 |
| 2016–17 | 5 | 1ª División | 17th | 9–19 |

== Women's team ==
CB Las Rozas has also a women's team who plays at Liga Femenina 2 since 2011.
