= Jordi Trias =

Spanish basketball player

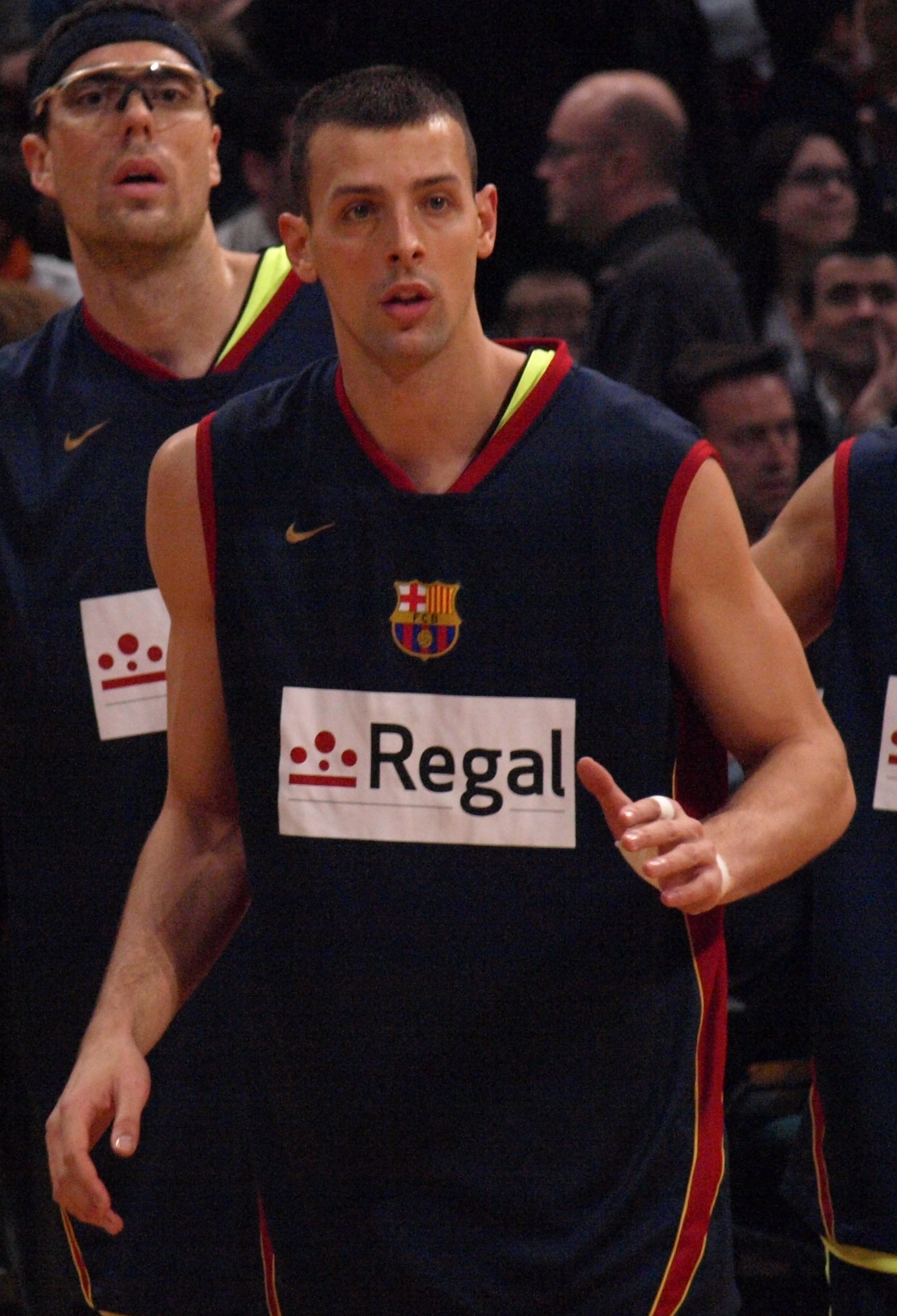
- Trias with FC Barcelona.

Personal information
- Born: November 5, 1980 (age 46) Girona, Catalonia, Spain
- Listed height: 6 ft 9 in (2.06 m)
- Listed weight: 240 lb (109 kg)

Career information
- NBA draft: 2002: undrafted
- Playing career: 1998–2019
- Position: Power forward

Career history
- 1998–2001: ADEPAF Figueres
- 2001–2002: CB Murcia
- 2002–2004: CB Girona
- 2004: FC Barcelona
- 2005: CB Girona
- 2005–2010: FC Barcelona
- 2010–2013: Club Joventut Badalona
- 2013–2015: BC Andorra
- 2015–2016: Valencia Basket
- 2016–2017: FC Barcelona B
- 2017–2018: Bàsquet Manresa
- 2018–2019: Bàsquet Girona

Career highlights
- EuroLeague champion (2010); Spanish Cup MVP (2007); Spanish Copa Príncipe MVP (2014); Spanish LEB Oro MVP (2014, 2017, 2018); Spanish LEB Plata MVP (2019)

Jordi Trias Feliu (born November 5, 1980) is a Spanish former basketball player. Standing at 2.06 m (6 ft 9 in), he plays at the power forward position.

== Professional career ==
After spending his early years at his hometown's local team, Girona, Trias was finally transferred to FC Barcelona at the beginning of the 2004–05 season. He was named the 2007 Spanish King's Cup MVP. After spending five seasons by FC Barcelona he signed a four-year contract with DKV Joventut in August 2010.

== Sportive evolution ==
- CE Maristes Girona: Youth Clubs
- CB Sant Josep Girona: Youth Clubs
- Club Bàsquet Girona: Youth Clubs
- ADEPAF Figueres: 1998-01
- Etosa Murcia: 2001-02
- Casademont Girona: 2002-04
- FC Barcelona: 2004
- Casademont Girona: 2005
- FC Barcelona: 2005-2010
- DKV Joventut: 2010-2013

== Spain national team ==
Trias won the bronze medal at the 2005 Mediterranean Games, while playing for the Spain national basketball team.

== Career statistics ==
Legend
GP	Games played	GS	Games started	MPG	Minutes per game
FG%	Field-goal percentage	3P%	3-point field-goal percentage	FT%	Free-throw percentage
RPG	Rebounds per game	APG	Assists per game	SPG	Steals per game
BPG	Blocks per game	PPG	Points per game	PIR	Performance index rating
**Bold**	Career high

=== EuroLeague ===
†	Denotes seasons in which Trias won the EuroLeague

Year	Team	GP	GS	MPG	FG%	3P%	FT%	RPG	APG	SPG	BPG	PPG	PIR
2004–05	Barcelona	10	1	11.8	.485	**.333**	.529	2.8	.2	.6	.3	4.3	4.9
2005–06	Barcelona	21	7	12.7	.519	.200	.577	3.4	.7	.4	**.8**	4.7	5.6
2006–07	Barcelona	**23**	**16**	**23.2**	**.705**	**.333**	.537	5.2	**2.2**	**.8**	.7	**7.4**	**13.3**
2007–08	Barcelona	22	12	20.6	.646	.000	.621	**5.2**	1.6	.5	.5	6.6	11.4
2008–09	Barcelona	11	2	10.0	.619	**.333**	**.692**	2.5	.5	.2	.4	3.4	5.2
2009–10†	Barcelona	13	0	5.8	.455	.250	.667	1.2	.5	.1	.1	2.2	2.6
Career		100	38	15.6	.607	.276	.585	3.8	1.1	.5	.5	5.2	8.1

== Awards and accomplishments ==
- Euroleague (1): 2010
- Spanish Championships (1): 2009
- Spanish Cups (2): 2007, 2010
- Spanish Cup MVP: 2007
- Spanish Supercups (2): 2004, 2009
- Spanish Copa Príncipe (1): 2014
- Spanish Copa Príncipe MVP (1): 2014
- Spanish Second Division (1): 2014
- Spanish Second Division MVP (3): 2014, 2017, 2018
- Spanish Third Division MVP (1): 2019
- Catalan Tournaments (2): 2004–05, 2009–10
