= 2008–09 LEB Plata season =

2010–11 LEB Plata season
- League: LEB Plata
- Sport: Basketball
- Number of games: 240 (regular season)
- Number of teams: 16

Regular Season
- Season champions: Palencia Baloncesto
- Season MVP: (Haiti) Robert Joseph

Play-offs
- Play-offs champions: WTC Almeda Park Cornellà
- Play-offs runners-up: Tarragona 2017

Copa LEB Plata
- Champions: Faymasa Palencia
- Runners-up: Torrons Vicens L'Hospitalet

LEB Plata seasons
- ← 2007–08 2009–10 →

The 2008–09 LEB Plata season was the 9th season of the LEB Plata, second league of the Liga Española de Baloncesto and third division in Spain. It is also named Adecco Plata for sponsorship reasons.

== Competition format ==
16 teams play the regular season. This is a round robin, where each team will play twice against every rival. The champion of the Regular Season is promoted to LEB Oro and the eight next teams enter the play-offs, where the winner is promoted too.

The last two qualified teams were relegated to LEB Bronce.

If two or more teams have got the same number of winning games, the criteria of tie-breaking are these:

1. Head-to-head winning games.
2. Head-to-head points difference.
3. Total points difference.

== Regular season ==
=== League table ===
#	Teams	GP	W	L	PF	PA	PT	Qualification or relegation
1	Faymasa Palencia (C)	30	20	10	2341	2089	50	Promotion to LEB Oro
2	CajaRioja	30	19	11	2258	2197	49	Promotion playoffs
3	HNV Duar Navarra	30	19	11	2114	2051	49	Promotion playoffs
4	Torrons Vicens L'Hospitalet	30	19	11	2389	2279	49	Promotion playoffs
5	WTC Almeda Park Cornellà	30	18	12	2394	2326	48	Promotion playoffs
6	Gestibérica Ciudad de Vigo	30	18	12	2293	2119	48	Promotion playoffs
7	Canasta Unibasket Jerez	30	17	13	2283	2241	47	Promotion playoffs
8	Tarragona 2017	30	17	13	2408	2317	47	Promotion playoffs
9	Plasencia Extremadura	30	16	14	2226	2213	46	Promotion playoffs
10	Ourense Grupo Juanes	30	15	15	2165	2124	45	
11	Lobe Huesca	30	14	16	2178	2203	44	
12	CB Prat Joventut	30	11	19	2105	2268	41	
13	Viopisa Gijón Baloncesto	30	10	20	2177	2402	40	
14	Cajasur Córdoba 2016	30	10	20	2168	2301	40	
15	Leyma Básquet Coruña	30	9	21	2118	2273	39	Relegation to LEB Bronce
16	Qalat Cajasol	30	8	22	2205	2319	38	Relegation to LEB Bronce

(C) indicates Copa LEB Plata champion.

== Copa LEB Plata ==
At the half of the first round, the two first teams in the table play the Copa LEB Plata at home of the winner of the first half season. The Champion of this Cup will play the play-offs as first qualified if finishes the league between the 2nd and the 5th qualified.

Faymasa Palencia was the champion after defeating Torrons Vicens L'Hospitalet by 69–65.

== Playoffs ==
Teams qualified from 2nd to 9th will play the promotion play-off. If the winner of Copa LEB Plata is qualified between 2nd and 5th at the final of the Regular Season, it will join the play-offs as 2nd qualified. A best-of-five series and a Final Four hosted at Fuenlabrada (with re-seeding) decided who promotes to LEB Oro.

Quarterfinals
2	CajaRioja	3
9	Plasencia Extremadura	0
3	HNV Duar Navarra	1
8	Tarragona 2017	3
(Pairings are reseeded after the first round)
4	TV L'Hospitalet	3
7	Canasta Unibasket	1
5	WTC Cornellà	3
6	Gestibérica Vigo	0

Semifinals
2	CajaRioja	68
8	Tarragona 2017	82
4	TV L'Hospitalet	82
5	WTC Cornellà	88

Finals
8	Tarragona 2017	69
5	WTC Cornellà	73

== MVP of the regular season ==
- (Haiti) Robert Joseph (Leyma Básquet Coruña)

== Final Four MVP ==
- (Bosnia and Herzegovina) Nihad Đedović (WTC Almeda Park Cornellà)
