= Palencia Baloncesto =

- Leagues: Primera FEB
- Founded: 1979; 47 years ago
- History: Palencia Baloncesto (1979–present)
- Arena: Pabellón Municipal
- Capacity: 5,000
- Location: Palencia, Spain
- Team colors: Purple, gold and grey
- President: Gonzalo Ibáñez
- Head coach: Luis Guil
- Championships: 1 LEB Oro Championship; 3 Copa Princesa de Asturias; 1 LEB Plata Championship; 1 Copa LEB Plata; 2 Copa Castilla y León
- Website: palenciabaloncesto.com
Home	Away

Palencia Baloncesto, officially named as Super Agropal Palencia for sponsorship reasons, is a Spanish professional basketball team based in Palencia, Castile and León. The team currently plays in the Primera FEB, the second tier of basketball in Spain.

== History ==
The club was founded in 1979 at Colegio Marista of Palencia, with the aim to support farm teams competing at provincial and regional tournaments.

The professional basketball team was created on 1997 and played during five years at Liga EBA before being invited to join the LEB Plata. On the 2008–09, Palencia Baloncesto won the Copa LEB Plata and was champion of this league, promoting for the first time in their history to LEB Oro, the Spanish second division.

In 2014 Palencia Baloncesto was defeated by CB Tizona in the promotion playoffs finals to Liga ACB by 1–3. Two years later, the club achieved the promotion by finishing as champion of the 2015–16 LEB Oro season and the Copa Princesa de Asturias, but resigned to promote due to the impossibility to fulfill the requirements.

== Naming ==
CD Maristas Palencia had several denominations through the years:

- Maristas Palencia: 1979–2002
- Hormigones Saldaña Palencia: 2002–2005
- Provincia de Palencia: 2005–2006
- Alimentos de Palencia: 2006–2008
- Faymasa Palencia: 2008–2009
- Palencia Baloncesto: 2009–2013
- Quesos Cerrato Palencia: 2013–2017
- Chocolates Trapa Palencia: 2017–2020
- Destino Palencia Baloncesto: 2020–2021
- EasyCharger Palencia: 2021
- Zunder Palencia: 2022–2024
- Súper Agropal Palencia: 2024–present

== Players ==
=== Current roster ===
Note: Flags indicate national team eligibility at FIBA-sanctioned events. Players may hold other non-FIBA nationalities not displayed.

Palencia Baloncesto roster
Players
Coaches

Pos.	No.	Nat.	Name	Ht.	Age
C	0	(Senegal)	Ngom, Tanor	2.18 m (7 ft 2 in)	28 – 19 January 1998
SG	6	(Sweden)	Borg, Tobias	1.83 m (6 ft 0 in)	32 – 2 November 1993
PG	8	(Latvia)	Jakovičs, Ingus	1.86 m (6 ft 1 in)	33 – 18 April 1993
SG	11	(United States)	Littleson, Spencer	1.93 m (6 ft 4 in)	28 – 29 May 1998
PF	13	(Croatia) (Canada)	Vrankić, Josip	2.05 m (6 ft 9 in)	27 – 24 October 1998
PG	17	(Spain)	Naspler, Toni	1.97 m (6 ft 6 in)	23 – 11 July 2003
SF	21	(Spain)	Jordá, Álex	1.93 m (6 ft 4 in)	31 – 13 September 1995
SG	23	(Spain)	Martínez, Álvaro	2.00 m (6 ft 7 in)	23 – 24 January 2003
F/C	33	(Serbia)	Vučetić, Vasilije	2.08 m (6 ft 10 in)	30 – 4 May 1996
SF	36	(Spain)	Muñoz, Álvaro	1.96 m (6 ft 5 in)	35 – 25 November 1990
PF	44	(Netherlands)	de Graaf, Kjell	2.08 m (6 ft 10 in)	27 – 8 September 1999
PG	55	(Spain)	Pérez, Dani	1.88 m (6 ft 2 in)	36 – 28 February 1990

Head coach

- (Spain) Natxo Lezkano

Assistant coach(es)

- (Spain) Alberto Padilla
- (Spain) Julen Forniés

Legend

- (C) Team captain
- Injured

== Head coaches ==
- Natxo Lezkano 2008–2015
- Porfirio Fisac 2015
- Sergio García 2015–2017
- Joaquín Pardo 2017–2018
- Alejandro Martínez 2018–2019
- Carles Marco 2019–2022
- Pedro Rivero 2022–2023
- Marco Justo 2023
- Alberto Padilla (int.) 2023
- Luis Guil 2023–present

== Season by season ==
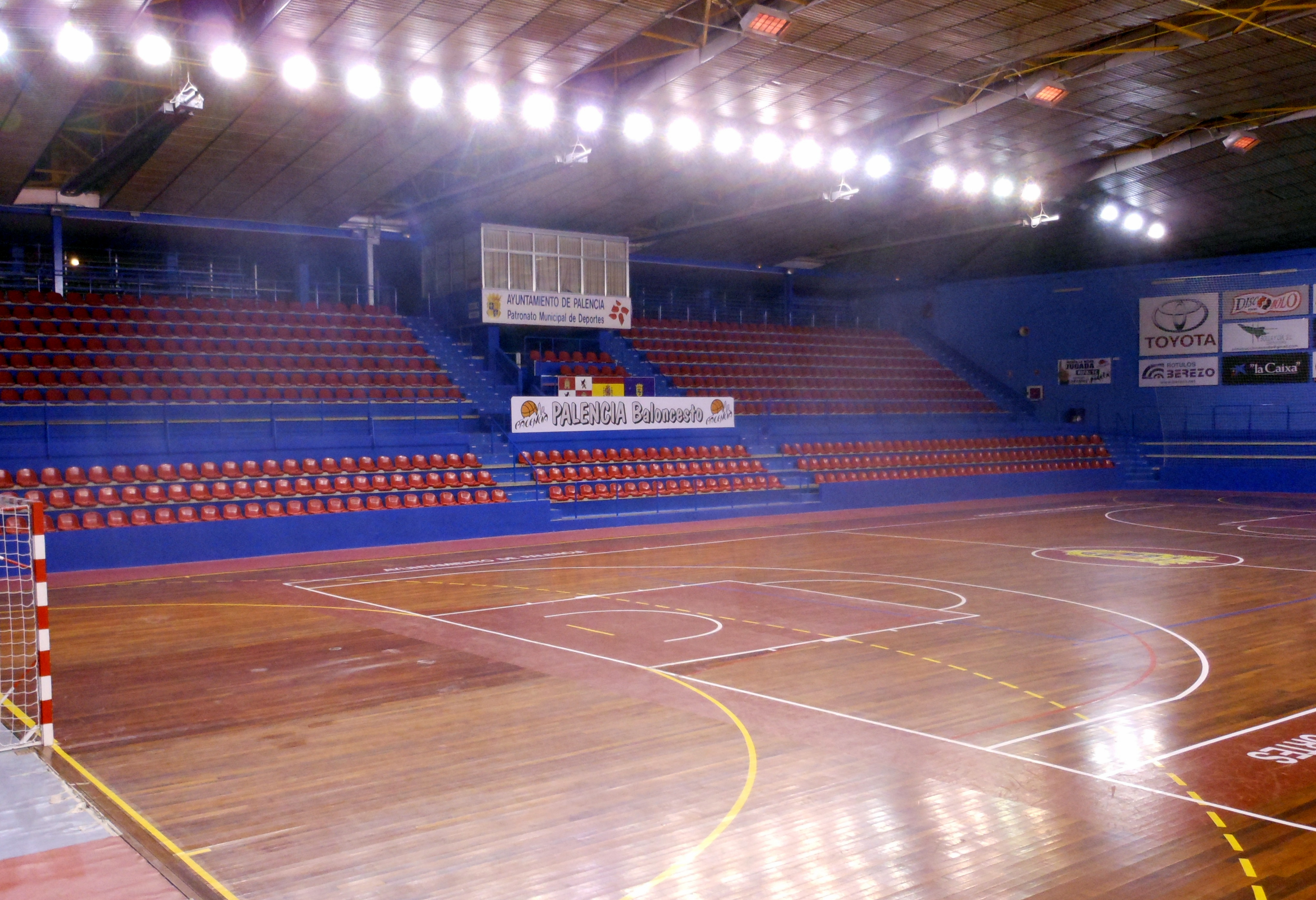
Pabellón Municipal, formerly known as Pabellón Marta Domínguez, before its expansion.

Season	Tier	Division	Pos.	W–L	Cup Competitions	
2000–01	4	Liga EBA	13th	10–20		
2001–02	4	Liga EBA	10th	16–18		
2002–03	4	Liga EBA	1st	26–6		
2003–04	4	Liga EBA	4th	21–9		
2004–05	4	Liga EBA	3rd (Note: Achieved one of the vacant berths in LEB 2.)	27–7		
2005–06	3	LEB 2	10th	13–17		
2006–07	3	LEB 2	7th	18–19		
2007–08	3	LEB Plata	13th	12–22	Copa LEB Plata	SF
2008–09	3	LEB Plata	1st	20–10	Copa LEB Plata	C
2009–10	2	LEB Oro	13th	14–20		
2010–11	2	LEB Oro	16th	15–22		
2011–12	2	LEB Oro	11th	18–16		
2012–13	2	LEB Oro	4th	18–16		
2013–14	2	LEB Oro	3rd	26–10	Copa Príncipe	RU
2014–15	2	LEB Oro	8th	15–16	Copa Príncipe	C
2015–16	2	LEB Oro	1st (Note: Did not promote to Liga ACB as the club did not meet the requirements.)	23–7	Copa Princesa	C
2016–17	2	LEB Oro	3rd	28–18		
2017–18	2	LEB Oro	5th	21–21		
2018–19	2	LEB Oro	9th	21–18		
2019–20	2	LEB Oro	5th (Note: Season curtailed due to the COVID-19 pandemic.)	15–9		
2020–21	2	LEB Oro	10th	10–16		
2021–22	2	LEB Oro	5th	23–15		
2022–23	2	LEB Oro	2nd	32–7	Copa Princesa	C
2023–24	1	Liga ACB	18th	6–28		
2024–25	2	Primera FEB	5th	25–14	Spain Cup	GS
2025–26	2	Primera FEB	4th	28–10	Spain Cup	RU
2026–27	2	Primera FEB			Spain Cup	R32

== Trophies and awards ==
=== Trophies ===
- LEB Oro: (1)
  - 2016
- Copa Princesa de Asturias: (3)
  - 2015, 2016, 2023
- LEB Plata: (1)
  - 2009
- Copa LEB Plata: (1)
  - 2009
- Copa Castilla y León: (2)
  - 2012, 2015

=== Individual awards ===
All-LEB Oro Team

- Urko Otegui – 2013
- Marc Blanch – 2016

== Notable players ==
- (Brazil) Vítor Benite
- (Ivory Coast) Charles Abouo
- (United States) (Spain) Mike Hansen
- (Montenegro) (Spain) Nikola Mirotić
- (United States) Michael Dickerson
- (United States) (Cape Verde) Jeff Xavier
- (Lithuania) Gabrielius Maldūnas
- (Lithuania) Mindaugas Kačinas
- (Lithuania) Simas Jasaitis
- (Finland) Samuel Haanpää
- (Finland) Ville Kaunisto
