= Alfredo Ott =

American basketball player (born 1983)

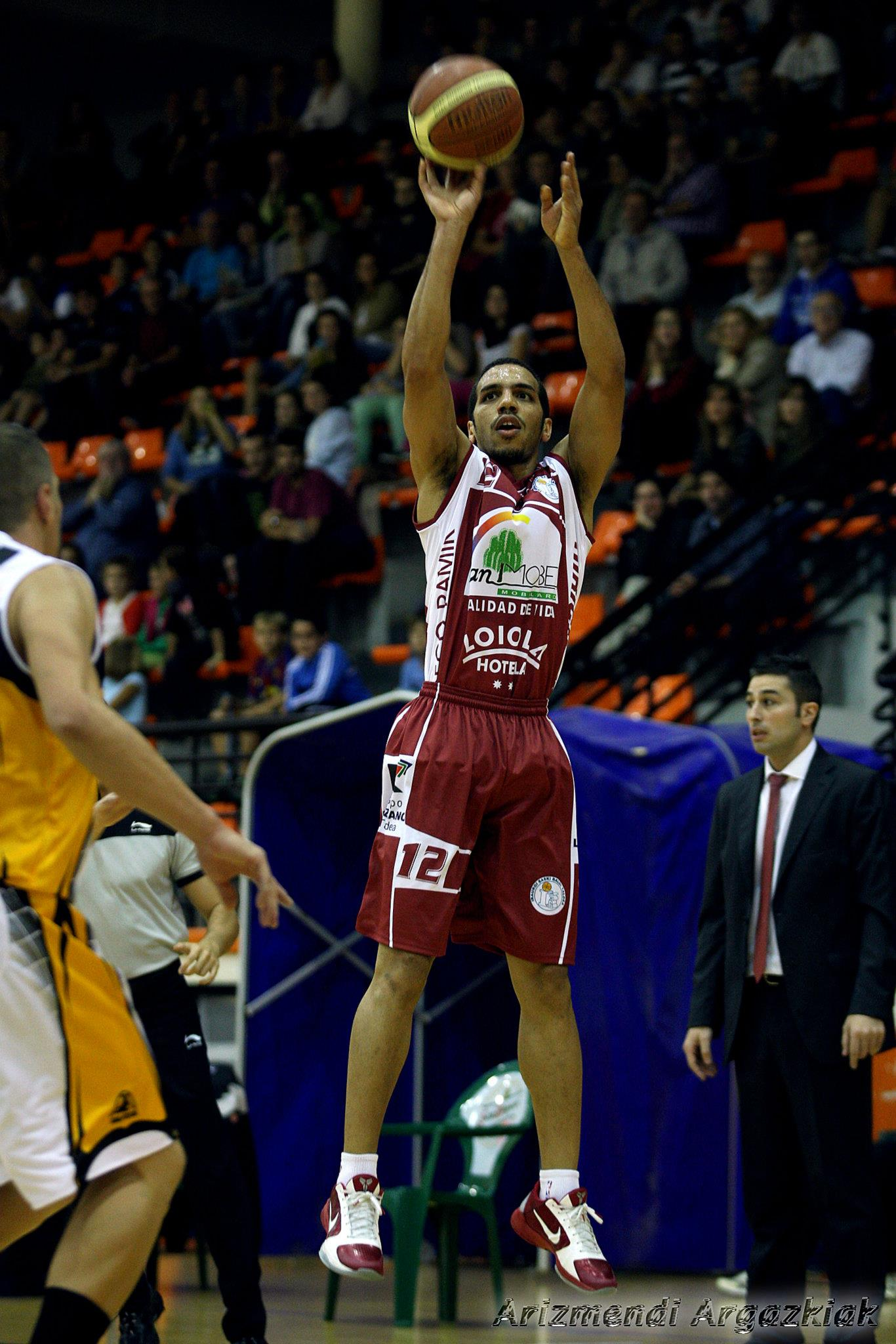

Río Ourense Termal
- Position: Shooting guard
- League: LEB Oro

Personal information
- Born: January 27, 1983 (age 43) New Orleans, Louisiana
- Listed height: 6 ft 3 in (1.91 m)
- Listed weight: 185 lb (84 kg)

Career information
- High school: St. Augustine (New Orleans, Louisiana)
- College: Dillard (2001–2005)
- NBA draft: 2005: undrafted
- Playing career: 2005–present

Career history
- 2005–2007: Worthing Thunder
- 2007–2009: Navarra
- 2009–2011: Clavijo
- 2011–2012: Iraurgi
- 2012–2013: Palencia
- 2013–2016: Clavijo
- 2016–2017: Melilla
- 2017–2018: Castelló
- 2018–2020: Ourense
- 2020–2022: Clavijo

Alfredo Joseph Ott III (born January 27, 1983) is an American basketball player for Río Ourense Termal of Spain's LEB Oro. He previously played two years for the Worthing Thunder of England's EBL Division 1 (now in the BBL), and Dillard University Blue Devils of National Association of Intercollegiate Athletics (NAIA) Division One.

== College career ==
Born and raised in New Orleans, Louisiana, Ott played college basketball at Dillard University from 2001 to 2005. He helped to lead the Bleu Devils to the NAIA National Tournament in 2002 and the Sweet Sixteen in 2003. He is one of the only players from Dillard to be currently playing professionally.

== Pro career ==
In the 2007–08 season, Ott was the top scorer of HNV-Consmetal Navarra, and for the Worthing Thunder in 2006–2007. Ott was the first player signed by HNV-Consmetal Navarra for the 2008–2009 season. In the 2009–2010 season he helped CB Clavijo to the playoffs semifinals.

In 2010–11 season, played for CB Clavijo, LEB Plata and helped them win the League title and become champions of the LEB Plata division. In the summer of 2011, signed for Lan Mobel ISB.

In 2012, he signs for Palencia Baloncesto where he will debut at LEB Oro, Spanish second division and in 2013 Ott comes back to CB Clavijo but this time for playing at LEB Oro.
