= Charles Abouo =

Ivorian basketball player

Free Agent
- Position: Small forward

Personal information
- Born: November 4, 1989 (age 37) Cocody, Côte d'Ivoire
- Listed height: 6 ft 5 in (1.96 m)
- Listed weight: 215 lb (98 kg)

Career information
- High school: Logan (Logan, Utah); Brewster Academy (Wolfeboro, New Hampshire)
- College: BYU (2008–2012)
- NBA draft: 2012: undrafted
- Playing career: 2012–present

Career history
- 2012–2013: CB Peñas Huesca
- 2013–2014: Quesos Cerrato Palencia
- 2015–2015: Gezira
- 2015–2016: Al-Khor
- 2016–2017: Denain
- 2017–2018: Fos Provence
- 2018–2019: ADA Blois Basket 41
- 2019–2020: Fos Provence
- 2020–2024: ESSM Le Portel
Medals
Men's basketball
Representing Ivory Coast
FIBA AfroBasket
Silver medal – second place	2009 Libya

Charles-Noe' Abouo (born November 4, 1989) is an Ivorian basketball player who last played for ESSM Le Portel of the French LNB Pro A. Standing at 6 ft 5 in (1.96 m) and 215 lb (98 kg), he also played for the Côte d'Ivoire national basketball team.

== Early career ==
Abouo attended Logan High School in Utah where he was the school's all-time leading scorer. He was a three-time all-state player and was named Utah Class 3A Player of the Year following his senior season. Upon graduation, Abouo spent a year playing for Brewster Academy in Wolfeboro, New Hampshire, where he helped the team to the New England Preparatory School Athletic Conference Class A Championship.

== College career ==
Abouo then moved back to Utah and signed with Brigham Young University following his year in prep school. During his freshman season, he averaged 2.9 points per game and 1.9 rebounds per game off the bench for the Mountain West Conference champions.

Abouo started all 35 games as a senior and averaged 11.0 points, 6.2 rebounds, 2.6 assists, 1.1 steals in 26.8 minutes per game for the 26-9 Cougars. He set BYU records for most career wins (113) and for career games/consecutive games played with 141. Abouo never missed a game throughout his collegiate career.

== Professional career ==
In 2012, Abouo signed his first professional contract with the Lobe Huesca, team that plays in the LEB Oro, Spanish second division.

On July 12, 2018, he has signed with ADA Blois Basket 41 of the French LNB Pro B. Abouo spent the 2019–20 season with Fos Provence and averaged 10.3 points, 3.2 rebounds, and 1.7 assists per game. He signed with ESSM Le Portel on October 1, 2020.

=== The Basketball Tournament (TBT) ===
In the summer of 2017, Abouo played in The Basketball Tournament on ESPN for Team Fredette. He competed for the $2 million prize, and for Team Fredette, he scored 15 points in their first-round game, which they lost to Team Utah (Utah Alumni) 100–97. In TBT 2018, Abouo averaged 2.2 pts for Team Fredette. They lost in the first round to Team Utah.

== Côte d'Ivoire national team ==
Abouo was a member of the Côte d'Ivoire national basketball team at the 2009 FIBA Africa Championship. At the tournament, he helped the team to a surprise silver medal to qualify for the country's first FIBA World Championship in 24 years by averaging 5.2 PPG and 2.2 RPG.
