= Johnny Dee (basketball) =

American basketball player

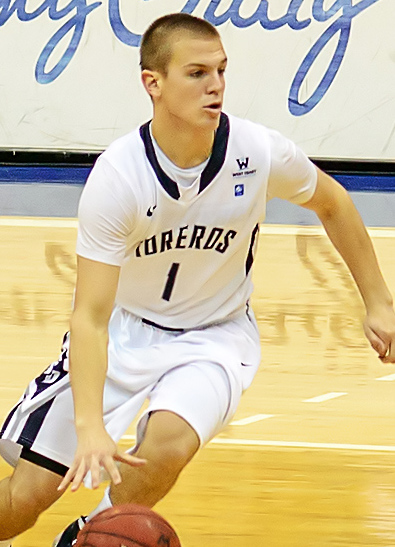
- Dee with San Diego in 2013

No. 1 – Flexicar Fuenlabrada
- Position: Shooting guard
- League: Primera FEB

Personal information
- Born: November 4, 1992 (age 32) Denver, Colorado, U.S.
- Listed height: 6 ft 0 in (1.83 m)
- Listed weight: 185 lb (84 kg)

Career information
- High school: Rancho Buena Vista (Vista, California); Blue Valley West (Overland Park, Kansas)
- College: San Diego (2011–2015)
- NBA draft: 2015: undrafted
- Playing career: 2015–present

Career history
- 2015: Široki
- 2015–2016: Starogard Gdański
- 2017–2018: Araberri
- 2018–2019: Real Betis
- 2019–2021: Gipuzkoa
- 2021–2022: Estudiantes
- 2022–2023: Andorra
- 2023–2024: Estudiantes
- 2024–present: Fuenlabrada

Career highlights
- 4x Copa Princesa de Asturias (2019, 2020, 2022, 2024); Copa Princesa de Asturias MVP (2020); LEB Oro scoring champion (2017); 2× First-team All-WCC (2014, 2015); WCC All-Freshman Team (2012)

Johnny Dee (born November 4, 1992) is an American basketball player for Fuenlabrada of the Primera FEB. He played college basketball for the San Diego Toreros.

== Early life ==
Johnny Dee was born on November 4, 1992, in Denver, Colorado, US. Dee's grandfather, Don Dee, played for the Indiana Pacers and was on the U.S. 1968 Olympic gold-medal-winning basketball team. His father, Donnie Dee, played for the Indianapolis Colts in the NFL for two seasons, while his mother, Jackie, was on the cross country team at the University of Tulsa. He has a younger sister Jenny who played basketball at UC Irvine. Johnny Dee was a part of the Rancho Buena Vista Little League All-Star team that advanced to the 2005 Little League World Series, playing shortstop. He attended Rancho Buena Vista High School and led the San Diego Section in scoring as a senior with 32.8 points per game. Portland State was the only Division I school to offer him a scholarship, but Dee decided to walk on at San Diego.

== College career ==
When Dee arrived at San Diego, the team was coming off a 6–24 season and point-shaving scandal. Dee received a scholarship the summer before his freshman year after a player announced he was leaving the program. He considered redshirting, but coach Bill Grier talked him out of the idea and he averaged 13.7 points per game. Dee increased his scoring to 15.0 points per game as a sophomore. He twisted his left ankle playing against Loyola Marymount but still managed to score 19 points in a win over BYU three nights later. As a junior, Dee played most of the season with a knee injury. During this time, he led NCAA Division I in free throw shooting percentage at 94.5% while averaging 16.6 points per game. In order to calm his nerves at the line, Dee silently recited the Bible verse Philippians 4:13: "I can do all things through him who gives me strength." As a senior, Dee averaged 17.0 points per game and shot 37.9 percent from behind the arc. Dee is San Diego's all-time leading scorer, finishing with 2,046 points, the all-time leader in three-pointers with 333, and was tied for second in games played with 131. He was a two-time All-West Coast Conference First Team selection.

== Professional career ==
After going undrafted, Dee signed with the Golden State Warriors in the NBA Summer League. Dee began his professional career with Široki and averaged over 19 points per game. On November 9, 2015, he signed with Polish club Starogard Gdański. He averaged 11 points per game in Poland. In the 2017–2018 season, Dee joined Araberri of the Spanish LEB Oro. He posted 15.9 points per game, which led the league in scoring. He also averaged 2.5 assists per game. On August 6, 2018, he signed a two-year deal with Real Betis in the same league. On July 13, 2019, he signed with Delteco Gipuzkoa Basket in the same league. On February 4, 2020, he won the Copa Princesa de Asturias for the second year in a row, and was also selected as the MVP of the final. During the 2020–21 season, he averaged 10.6 points, 1.9 rebounds, and 1.1 assists per game. Dee signed with Movistar Estudiantes on August 4, 2021.

On June 29, 2024, he signed with Fuenlabrada of the Primera FEB.

According to his player profile, he is 6 ft 0 in (1.83 m) and weighs 185 lb (84 kg).
