= Natxo Lezkano =

Spanish basketball coach

Palencia Baloncesto
- Position: Head coach
- League: Primera FEB

Personal information
- Born: 17 October 1972 (age 54) Portugalete, Spain
- Coaching career: 1997–present

Career history

Coaching
- 1997–2001: Campus Álava
- 2001–2007: Baskonia (assistant)
- 2007: Baskonia
- 2007–2015: Palencia
- 2011–2015: Ivory Coast
- 2015–2016: Toros de Aragua
- 2016–2019: Breogán
- 2020–2022: Oviedo
- 2020–present: Ivory Coast
- 2022–2025: Andorra
- 2025: Estudiantes
- 2025–present: Palencia

Career highlights
- As head coach: LEB Plata champion (2009); Copa LEB Plata winner (2009); 2 LEB Oro champion (2018, 2023); 2 Copa Princesa de Asturias winner (2015, 2018); As Assistant Coach: Spanish League champion (2002); Spanish Cup champion (2002)

Natxo Lezkano Moya (born 17 October 1972) is a Spanish professional basketball coach, who most recently managed Súper Agropal Palencia of the Primera FEB. Since 2011, he has coached Ivory Coast's national basketball team, which he led to two Final Four finishes at the FIBA Africa Championship. He also led professional teams in Venezuela and Spain.

In 2020, Lezkano re-joined the Ivory Coast national basketball team, and led the team to a silver medal at FIBA AfroBasket 2021.
