= Kevin van Wijk =

Dutch basketball player

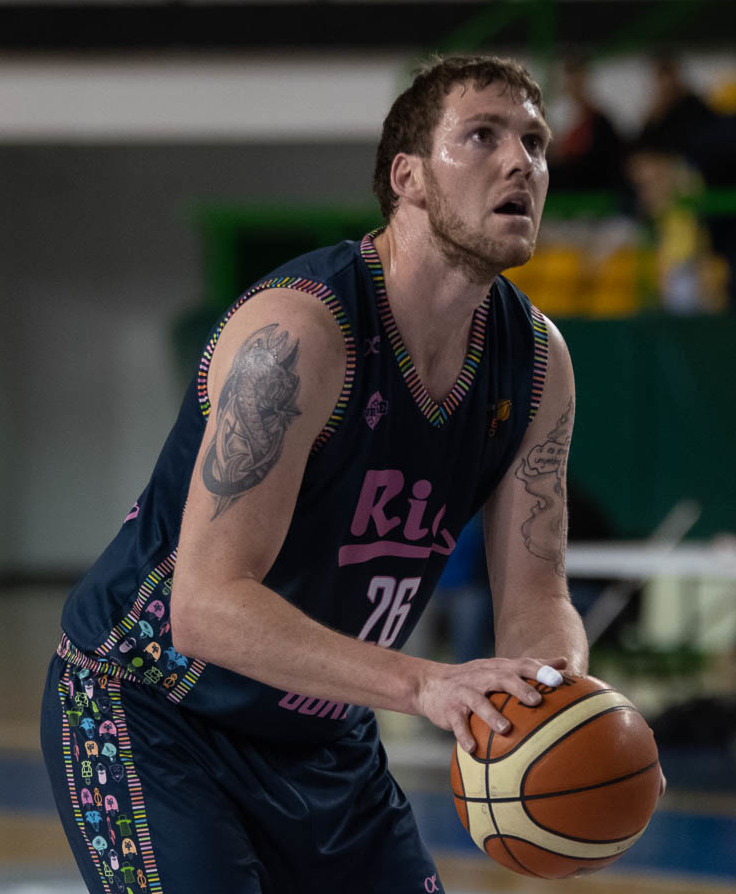
- Van Wijk with Ourense in 2019

No. 16 – CB Marín Peixegalego
- Position: Power forward / center
- League: LEB Oro

Personal information
- Born: 17 April 1989 (age 37) Hoofddorp, Netherlands
- Listed height: 6 ft 8 in (2.03 m)
- Listed weight: 222 lb (101 kg)

Career information
- College: Valparaiso (2010–2013)
- Playing career: 2007–present

Career history
- 2007–2009: Gran Canaria B
- 2013–2014: Oviedo
- 2014–2015: Breogán
- 2015–2016: Oviedo
- 2016–2017: Melilla
- 2017–2018: Huesca
- 2018–2022: Ourense
- 2022–present: CB Marín Peixegalego

Kevin van Wijk (born 17 April 1989) is a Dutch professional basketball player for CB Marín Peixegalego of the Spanish LEB Oro.

== Career ==
Van Wijk played three years of U.S. college basketball for the Valparaiso Crusaders.

In September 2013, van Wijk signed his first pro-contract with Oviedo CB of the LEB Oro, the second division in Spain. Thanks to his good season, he was pre-selected with the Dutch national team.

On August 29, 2021, van Wijk re-signed with Río Ourense Termal.
