= Pazo dos Deportes =

Sports arena in Lugo, Galicia, Spain

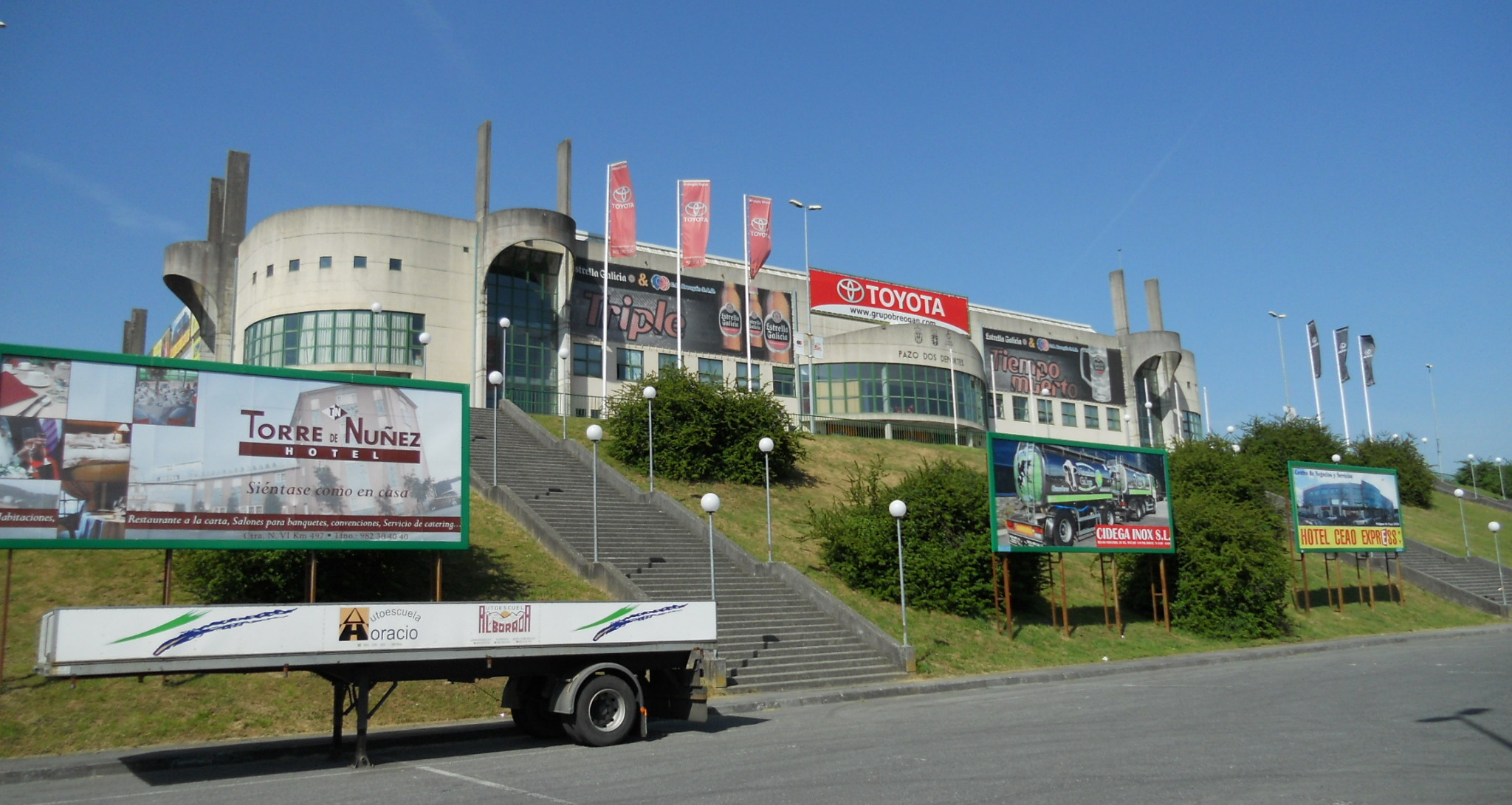
- Interactive map of Pazo dos Deportes
- Full name: Pazo Provincial dos Deportes de Lugo
- Location: Av. Filarmónica Lucense 27002; Lugo, Spain
- Coordinates: 42.991244°N 7.545235°W
- Owner: Deputación de Lugo
- Operator: Club Baloncesto Breogán
- Capacity: 5,310

Construction
- Opened: September 12, 1992

Tenant
- CB Breogán

Pazo dos Deportes de Lugo is a multi-purpose sports arena in Lugo, Galicia, Spain.

It is owned by Lugo provincial government. The arena serves as the home of the basketball team Club Baloncesto Breogán.
