= CB Clavijo =

- Leagues: LEB Oro
- Founded: 1967; 58 years ago
- Arena: Palacio de los Deportes de La Rioja
- Capacity: 4,500
- Location: Logroño, Spain
- Team colors: White and Blue
- President: Manuel de Miguel
- Head coach: Antonio Pérez
- Championships: 1 LEB Plata Championship; 2 Copa LEB Plata
- Website: www.cbclavijo.com
Home	Away

Club Baloncesto Clavijo is a professional Basketball team based in Logroño, La Rioja. The team currently plays in league LEB Oro.

== History ==
Founded in 1967, CB Clavijo started their first years playing in the provincial league and after achieving several promotions, reaches the Segunda División, third tier, in 1977. It played nine seasons, qualifying twice for the promotion playoffs to the second league, but after 1986 starts declining until 1998, when a group of former players and directors planned to take the helm of the club and to take it to the top divisions.

In 2001, Clavijo clinched the promotion to Liga EBA, where it played two seasons with former FC Barcelona player Salva Díez as part of the roster of the club.

In 2003, the club achieved a vacant berth in LEB 2, third tier, and in its debut season it clinched the Copa LEB 2 by defeating Rosalía de Castro 77–75 in the final played in Logroño.

Clavijo continued playing in LEB 2, later renamed as LEB Plata, until it clinched promotion to LEB Oro after winning their second Copa LEB Plata and winning the league with a record of 25 wins and only three losses.

In 2014, the club played for the first time ever the promotion playoffs to the Liga ACB, first division, but it was eliminated in the quarterfinals by CB Tizona. Three years later, the club relegated to LEB Plata but remained in the league after achieving a vacant place.

From the 2024-25 season onwards, Clavijo signed a collaboration agreement with Liga ACB team Saski Baskonia, becoming a farm team for the Basques in Segunda FEB. Baskonia sent several young prospects to play for the team.

== Sponsorship naming ==
Due to sponsorship reasons, the club has been known as:

- CajaRioja (until 2010)
- Knet Rioja (2010–2011)
- Knet & Éniac (2011–2012)
- Knet Clavijo (2012–2013)
- Cocinas.com (2013–2016)
- Calzados Robusta (2016–2017)
- Bodegas Rioja Vega [2018–present)

== Current roster ==
Note: Flags indicate national team eligibility at FIBA-sanctioned events. Players may hold other non-FIBA nationalities not displayed.

CB Clavijo roster
Players
Coaches

Pos.	No.	Nat.	Name	Ht.	Wt.	Age
SG	10	(Guinea)	Balamou, Felix	1.93 m (6 ft 4 in)		31 – 9 February 1994
C	12	(Netherlands)	Bieshaar, Terrence	2.08 m (6 ft 10 in)		28 – 28 July 1997
SG	8	(Spain)	Bravo, Carles	1.93 m (6 ft 4 in)		46 – 29 July 1979
SF	9	(Spain)	Cabot, Joan	2.02 m (6 ft 8 in)		37 – 28 April 1988
PG	1	(United States)	Coggins, Tre'	1.90 m (6 ft 3 in)		32 – 13 October 1992
PF	3	(Sweden)	Gutenius, William	2.05 m (6 ft 9 in)		32 – 17 September 1992
SF	18	(Spain)	Martínez, Carlos	2.00 m (6 ft 7 in)		29 – 19 January 1996
PF	5	(Cameroon)	Moto, Adala	1.98 m (6 ft 6 in)		32 – 24 June 1993
SG	22	(United Kingdom)	Phillip, Tarik	1.90 m (6 ft 3 in)		32 – 10 August 1993
PG	23	(Spain)	Quintela, Erik	1.86 m (6 ft 1 in)		34 – 17 August 1991
SF	11	(United States)	Yates, Evan	1.98 m (6 ft 6 in)		34 – 24 January 1991

Head coach

- (Spain) Jenaro Díaz

Assistant coach(es)

- (Spain) David Gómez

Legend

- (C) Team captain
- Injured

- Roster
Updated: February 28, 2018

== Notable players ==
- (United Kingdom) (United States) Tarik Phillip

== Season by season ==
Season	Tier	Division	Pos.	W–L	Cup competitions	
2001–02	4	Liga EBA	11th	16–18		
2002–03	4	Liga EBA	9th (Note: Achieved a vacant berth in LEB 2.)	16–14		
2003–04	3	LEB 2	5th	18–12	Copa LEB 2	C
2004–05	3	LEB 2	11th	13–17		
2005–06	3	LEB 2	11th	12–18		
2006–07	3	LEB 2	6th	20–18		
2007–08	3	LEB Plata	6th	23–13		
2008–09	3	LEB Plata	4th	22–12		
2009–10	3	LEB Plata	5th	25–16		
2010–11	3	LEB Plata	1st	25–3	Copa LEB Plata	C
2011–12	2	LEB Oro	10th	18–16		
2012–13	2	LEB Oro	12th	13–18		
2013–14	2	LEB Oro	8th	13–15		
2014–15	2	LEB Oro	13th	9–19		
2015–16	2	LEB Oro	13th	11–19		
2016–17	2	LEB Oro	17th (Note: Remained in the league after achieving a vacant place.)	10–24		
2017–18	2	LEB Oro	18th	12–22		
2018–19	3	LEB Plata	15th	18–16		
2019–20	3	LEB Plata	19th (Note: Season curtailed due to the COVID-19 pandemic.)	11–14		
2020–21	3	LEB Plata	10th	17–11		
2021–22	3	LEB Plata	8th	15–15		
2022–23	3	LEB Plata	3rd	23–9		
2023–24	2	LEB Oro	18th	5–29		

== Trophies and awards ==
=== Trophies ===
- LEB Plata: (1)
  - 2011
- Copa LEB Plata: (2)
  - 2004, 2011

=== Individual awards ===
All-LEB Oro Team

- Mikel Uriz – 2013
- Borja Arévalo – 2016

LEB Plata MVP

- Stevie Johnson – 2008

== Logos ==
Former primary logo

Primary logo

Logo of the 50 years anniversary of the club
