= 2015 LEB Oro playoffs =

The 2015 LEB Oro playoffs was the final stage of the 2014–15 LEB Oro season. They started on 28 April 2015, and ended on June 2.

The quarterfinals were played in a best-of-3 games format, while the semifinals and the finals in a best-of-5 games format. The best seeded team played at home the games 1, 2 and 5 if necessary. The winner of the finals had the option to promote to the 2015–16 ACB season with Ford Burgos, the champion of the regular season. Finally, Club Ourense Baloncesto won the playoffs but, as Ford Burgos, was not admitted in the Liga ACB.

== Bracket ==
Quarterfinals
2	Club Ourense Baloncesto	86	81	X
9	Club Melilla Baloncesto	84	77	X
5	Palma Air Europa	52	74	X
6	Actel Força Lleida	73	89	X
3	Ribeira Sacra Breogán Lugo	91	66	88
8	Quesos Cerrato Palencia	75	81	86
4	MyWigo Valladolid	68	74	X
7	Planasa Navarra	63	73	X

Semifinals
2	Club Ourense Baloncesto	75	83	77	X	X
6	Actel Força Lleida	61	81	59	X	X
3	Ribeira Sacra Breogán Lugo	80	73	85	86	X
4	MyWigo Valladolid	65	76	77	76	X

Finals
2	Club Ourense Baloncesto	83	68	73	73	91
3	Ribeira Sacra Breogán Lugo	52	77	81	69	65

== Quarterfinals ==
=== Club Ourense Baloncesto v Club Melilla Baloncesto ===
24 April 2015
21:00

Boxscore

Club Ourense Baloncesto	86–84	Club Melilla Baloncesto
Scoring by quarter: 24–24, 29–17, 21–24, 12–19
Pts: Arco 19; Rebs: Rivero 6 Asts: Rivero 3 PIR: Arco, Rivero 22		Pts: Tomàs 14; Rebs: Wright 9 Asts: three players 2 PIR: Tomàs 17

Pazo Paco Paz, Ourense
Attendance: 4,000
Referees: Vázquez García, Pinela García

28 April 2015
21:00

Boxscore

Club Melilla Baloncesto	77–81	Club Ourense Baloncesto
Scoring by quarter: 17–19, 16–16, 19–28, 25–18
Pts: Butterfield 24; Rebs: Gatell, Tomàs 7 Asts: Gatell, E. Sánchez 3 PIR: Butterfield 28		Pts: Bušma 23; Rebs: Bušma 10; Asts: Rivero 6 PIR: Bušma 26
Club Ourense Baloncesto wins the series, 2–0

Pabellón Javier Imbroda Ortiz, Melilla
Attendance: 1,500
Referees: Zamora Rodríguez, Pagán Baró

=== Ribeira Sacra Breogán Lugo v Quesos Cerrato Palencia ===
24 April 2015
21:00

Boxscore

Ribeira Sacra Breogán Lugo	91–75	Quesos Cerrato Palencia
Scoring by quarter: 23–24, 15–15, 26–18, 27–18
Pts: Llorca 18; Rebs: McGhee 13; Asts: S. Sánchez 5 PIR: Llorca 18		Pts: D. Rodríguez 18; Rebs: Arteaga 16; Asts: Otegui 4 PIR: Arteaga 29

Pazo dos Deportes, Lugo
Attendance: 4,000
Referees: De Lucas de Lucas, Bravo Loroño

28 April 2015
21:00

Boxscore

Quesos Cerrato Palencia	81–66	Ribeira Sacra Breogán Lugo
Scoring by quarter: 16–18, 25–16, 23–15, 17–17
Pts: three players 13; Rebs: Arteaga 8 Asts: Otegui, D. Rodríguez 3 PIR: Arteaga 20		Pts: Llorca 13; Rebs: McGhee, Samb 5 Asts: D. López 3 PIR: D. López 15

Pabellón Marta Domínguez, Palencia
Attendance: 3,000
Referees: Uruñuela Uruñuela, Mendoza Holgado

1 May 2015
19:15

Boxscore

Ribeira Sacra Breogán Lugo	88–86 (OT)	Quesos Cerrato Palencia
Scoring by quarter: 17–15, 17–21, 20–23, 25–20, Overtime: 9–7
Pts: Samb 26; Rebs: Matulionis 9 Asts: D. López 6 PIR: Samb 24		Pts: McDowell 21; Rebs: Arteaga 10; Asts: Otegui, D. Rodríguez 5 PIR: Otegui 26
Ribeira Sacra Breogán Lugo wins series, 2–1

Pazo dos Deportes, Lugo
Attendance: 5,100
Referees: Pagán Baró, Terreros San Miguel

=== MyWigo Valladolid v Planasa Navarra ===
24 April 2015
21:00

Boxscore

MyWigo Valladolid	68–63	Planasa Navarra
Scoring by quarter: 15–16, 21–19, 13–9, 19–19
Pts: Uriz 19; Rebs: De la Fuente, Uclés 9 Asts: Uriz 4 PIR: Uriz 23		Pts: Servera 16; Rebs: Moncasi 10; Asts: Servera 8 PIR: Servera 18

Pabellón Polideportivo Pisuerga, Valladolid
Attendance: 1,500
Referees: Terreros San Miguel, Quintas Álvarez

28 April 2015
20:30

Boxscore

Planasa Navarra	73–74	MyWigo Valladolid
Scoring by quarter: 26–24, 18–20, 8–12, 21–18
Pts: P. Almazán 15; Rebs: P. Almazán, I. García 8 Asts: Servera 5 PIR: P. Almazán 23		Pts: Pino 18; Rebs: Pino 5 Asts: Uriz 4 PIR: Pino 17
MyWigo Valladolid wins the series, 2–0

Polideportivo Anaitasuna, Pamplona
Attendance: 1,600
Referees: García León, Zafra Guerra

=== Palma Air Europa v Actel Força Lleida ===
26 April 2015
19:00

Boxscore

Palma Air Europa	52–73	Actel Força Lleida
Scoring by quarter: 8–20, 17–16, 15–14, 12–23
Pts: Vicens 14; Rebs: Vicens 6 Asts: Bertone 2 PIR: Vicens 14		Pts: Múgica 23; Rebs: Múgica 17; Asts: Fakuade 5 PIR: Múgica 41

Son Moix, Palma
Attendance: 3,200
Referees: Muñoz García, Torres Sánchez

29 April 2015
20:30

Boxscore

Actel Força Lleida	89–74	Palma Air Europa
Scoring by quarter: 27–10, 24–20, 21–28, 17–16
Pts: Kaufmanis 24; Rebs: Múgica 9 Asts: Simeón 4 PIR: Simeón 22		Pts: Bertone 19; Rebs: three players 5 Asts: Glover, Llorente 2 PIR: Di Bartolomeo, Llorente 14
Actel Força Lleida wins the series, 2–0

Pavelló Barris Nord, Lleida
Attendance: 3,600
Referees: Carpallo Miguélez, Zamorano Sánchez

== Semifinals ==
=== Club Ourense Baloncesto v Actel Força Lleida ===
8 May 2015
21:00

Boxscore

Club Ourense Baloncesto	75–61	Actel Força Lleida
Scoring by quarter: 12–11, 18–9, 16–22, 29–19
Pts: Rejón 12; Rebs: Brothers, Geramipoor 6 Asts: Suka-Umu 5 PIR: Rejón, Suka-Umu 16		Pts: Fakuade, Kaufmanis 13; Rebs: Fakaude 8 Asts: Kaufmanis 2 PIR: Fakuade 19

Pazo Paco Paz, Ourense
Referees: Terreros San Miguel, Quintas Álvarez

10 May 2015
19:00

Boxscore

Club Ourense Baloncesto	83–81 (OT)	Actel Força Lleida
Scoring by quarter: 16–15, 16–23, 24–20, 18–16, Overtime: 9–7
Pts: Arco 16; Rebs: three players 7 Asts: Suka-Umu 6 PIR: Arco 21		Pts: Kahlig 20; Rebs: Simeón 8 Asts: Simeón 3 PIR: three players 12

Pazo Paco Paz, Ourense
Referees: García León, Carpallo Miguélez

15 May 2015
21:00

Boxscore

Actel Força Lleida	59–77	Club Ourense Baloncesto
Scoring by quarter: 16–17, 15–21, 12–19, 16–20
Pts: Kahlig 11; Rebs: Múgica 9 Asts: Sutina 4 PIR: Simeón 16		Pts: Brothers 21; Rebs: Fieler 10; Asts: Arco 4 PIR: Brothers 21
Club Ourense Baloncesto wins series, 3–0

Pavelló Barris Nord, Lleida
Referees: Morales Ruiz, Bravo Loroño

=== Ribeira Sacra Breogán Lugo v Mywigo Valladolid ===
8 May 2015
21:00

Boxscore

Ribeira Sacra Breogán Lugo	80–65	MyWigo Valladolid
Scoring by quarter: 15–18, 23–18, 25–20, 17–9
Pts: Mortellaro 21; Rebs: Llorca, D. López 6 Asts: Llorca 6 PIR: Llorca 29		Pts: Montañez 18; Rebs: Uclés 9 Asts: Alvarado 4 PIR: De la Fuente 16

Pazo dos Deportes, Lugo
Referees: Zafra Guerra, Zamora Rodríguez

10 May 2015
18:45

Boxscore

Ribeira Sacra Breogán Lugo	73–76	MyWigo Valladolid
Scoring by quarter: 18–14, 19–12, 22–23, 14–27
Pts: A. López 18; Rebs: Samb 7 Asts: D. López 5 PIR: A. López 15		Pts: Pino 22; Rebs: Uclés 5 Asts: Uriz 4 PIR: Pino 21

Pazo dos Deportes, Lugo
Referees: Vázquez García, Zamorano Sánchez

15 May 2015
21:00

Boxscore

MyWigo Valladolid	77–85	Ribeira Sacra Breogán Lugo
Scoring by quarter: 25–15, 18–25, 11–23, 23–22
Pts: Pino 18; Rebs: De la Fuente 6 Asts: Alvarado 9 PIR: Alvarado 17		Pts: Llorca 26; Rebs: McGhee 9 Asts: A. López, D. López 3 PIR: Llorca 27

Pabellón Polideportivo Pisuerga, Valladolid
Referees: Pagán Baró, Muñoz García

17 May 2015
19:00

Boxscore

MyWigo Valladolid	76–86	Ribeira Sacra Breogán Lugo
Scoring by quarter: 19–20, 22–24, 11–18, 24–24
Pts: De la Fuente 16; Rebs: De la Fuente 7 Asts: Montañez, Rakočević 3 PIR: De la Fuente 20		Pts: A. López 20; Rebs: McGhee 11; Asts: Matulionis 5 PIR: A. López 18
Ribeira Sacra Breogán Lugo leads series, 3–1

Pabellón Polideportivo Pisuerga, Valladolid
Referees: Terreros San Miguel, Quintas Álvarez

== Final ==
=== Club Ourense Baloncesto v Ribeira Sacra Breogán Lugo ===
22 May 2015
21:00

Boxscore

Club Ourense Baloncesto	83–52	Ribeira Sacra Breogán Lugo
Scoring by quarter: 19–11, 21–9, 22–17, 21–15
Pts: Fieler 16; Rebs: Fieler 10; Asts: Suka-Umu 5 PIR: Fieler, Suka-Umu 22		Pts: Matulionis 13; Rebs: Llorca, McGhee 5 Asts: D. López, Matulionis 1 PIR: Matulionis 12

Pazo Paco Paz, Ourense
Referees: Uruñuela Uruñuela, Zafra Guerra

24 May 2015
19:00

Boxscore

Club Ourense Baloncesto	68–77	Ribeira Sacra Breogán Lugo
Scoring by quarter: 19–25, 16–16, 20–22, 13–14
Pts: Fieler 15; Rebs: Suka-Umu 5 Asts: Rejón 3 PIR: Arco 12		Pts: D. López 22; Rebs: McGhee 6 Asts: D. López 4 PIR: D. López 26

Pazo Paco Paz, Ourense
Referees: Vázquez García, Zamora Rodríguez

29 May 2015
21:00

Boxscore

Ribeira Sacra Breogán Lugo	81–73	Club Ourense Baloncesto
Scoring by quarter: 26–23, 14–12, 18–19, 23–19
Pts: D. López 21; Rebs: Samb 10; Asts: Llorca, McGhee 4 PIR: D. López 24		Pts: Arco 17; Rebs: Fieler 5 Asts: Rivero 4 PIR: Arco 19

Pazo dos Deportes, Lugo
Referees: Morales Ruiz, Carpallo Miguélez

31 May 2015
18:45

Boxscore

Ribeira Sacra Breogán Lugo	69–73	Club Ourense Baloncesto
Scoring by quarter: 18–16, 20–21, 18–17, 13–19
Pts: Matulionis, S. Sánchez 14; Rebs: McGhee 9 Asts: three players 4 PIR: Van Wijk 14		Pts: four players 11; Rebs: Rejón 12; Asts: three players 3 PIR: Rejón 22

Pazo dos Deportes, Lugo
Attendance: 7,000
Referees: Pagán Baró, Terreros San Miguel

2 June 2015
21:00

Boxscore

Club Ourense Baloncesto	91–65	Ribeira Sacra Breogán Lugo
Scoring by quarter: 15–23, 28–5, 26–24, 22–13
Pts: Suka-Umu 24; Rebs: Busma, Rejón 5 Asts: Suka-Umu 7 PIR: Suka-Umu 36		Pts: Matulionis 14; Rebs: Llorca, A. López 5 Asts: Á. López 2 PIR: Matulionis 12

Pazo Paco Paz, Ourense
Referees: Morales Ruiz, Muñoz García
