= 2013 LEB Oro Playoffs =

The 2013 LEB Oro Promotion Playoffs is the final stage of the 2012–13 LEB Oro Season. They had started on 26 April 2013, and they finished either on May 31 or June 2 or 4.

All the series were played in a best-of-5 games format. The best seeded team plays at home the games 1, 2 and 5 if necessary. The winner of the playoffs was promoted to the 2013–14 ACB season with Ford Burgos, the champion of the regular season.

== Bracket ==
Quarterfinals; April 26, 28, May 3, 5, 7
2 | River Andorra | 81 | 100 | 56 | 84 | 109
9 | Leyma Natura Básquet Coruña | 88 | 75 | 67 | 69 | 94
5 | CB Breogán | 88 | 77 | 74 | 65 | 72
6 | Cáceres Patrimonio de la Humanidad | 95 | 60 | 52 | 74 | 75
3 | Lucentum Alicante | 73 | 81 | 66 | 71 | X
8 | Lobe Huesca | 59 | 61 | 68 | 61 | X
4 | Palencia Baloncesto | 96 | 78 | 66 | 75 | 82
7 | Força Lleida CE | 90 | 82 | 72 | 62 | 71

Semifinals; May 10, 12, 17, 19, 21
2 | River Andorra | 71 | 82 | 56 | 82 | X
6 | Cáceres Patrimonio de la Humanidad | 68 | 59 | 73 | 70 | X
3 | Lucentum Alicante | 86 | 81 | 81 | X | X
4 | Palencia Baloncesto | 75 | 74 | 76 | X | X

Finals; May 24, 26, 31, June 2, 4
2 | River Andorra | 87 | 69 | 70 | 77 | 71
3 | Lucentum Alicante | 85 | 91 | 71 | 60 | 95

== Quarterfinals ==
=== River Andorra – Leyma Natura Básquet Coruña ===
26 April 2013
21:00

Stats

| River Andorra | 81–88 | Leyma Natura Bàsquet Coruña |
Scoring by quarter: 15–18, 23–19, 22–25, 21–26
| Pts: Flis 21; Rebs: Schreiner 3 Asts: D. Pérez 8 PIR: D. Pérez 22 | | Pts: Suka-Umu 22; Rebs: Lucas 6 Asts: Zengotitabengoa 5 PIR: Suka-Umu 27 |

Poliesportiu d'Andorra, Andorra la Vella
Referees: Afonso Castillo, Muñoz García

28 April 2013
18:00

Stats

| River Andorra | 100–75 | Leyma Natura Bàsquet Coruña |
Scoring by quarter: 22–9, 35–23, 26–26, 17–17
| Pts: Blanch 30; Rebs: P. Sánchez 7 Asts: Schreiner 6 PIR: Blanch 35 | | Pts: Hernández-Sonseca 14; Rebs: C. Johnson 6 Asts: Suka-Umu 4 PIR: Hernández-Sonseca 15 |

Poliesportiu d'Andorra, Andorra la Vella
Referees: Palenzuela Pastrana, Palomo Cañas

3 May 2013
21:00

Stats

| Leyma Natura Bàsquet Coruña | 67–56 | River Andorra |
Scoring by quarter: 9–15, 17–4, 14–24, 27–13
| Pts: Kale 17; Rebs: Hernández-Sonseca 15; Asts: Almazán 4 PIR: Hernández-Sonseca 30 | | Pts: D. Pérez 16; Rebs: 4 players 4 Asts: D. Pérez 4 PIR: D. Pérez 12 |

Palacio de los Deportes, A Coruña
Referees: Terreros San Miguel, López Córdoba

5 May 2013
12:30

Stats

| Leyma Natura Bàsquet Coruña | 69–84 | River Andorra |
Scoring by quarter: 22–17, 25–17, 11–34, 11–16
| Pts: Zengotitabengoa 21; Rebs: Hernández-Sonseca 7 Asts: Suka-Umu 4 PIR: Zengotitabengoa 18 | | Pts: Blanch 18; Rebs: Wright 6 Asts: Maresch 3 PIR: D. Pérez 20 |

Palacio de los Deportes, A Coruña
Referees: Bravo Loroño, Martínez Prada

7 May 2013
21:00

Stats

| River Andorra | 109–94 | Leyma Natura Básquet Coruña |
Scoring by quarter: 27–25, 26–18, 28–20, 28–31
| Pts: D. Pérez 19; Rebs: Flis 10; Asts: Schreiner 5 PIR: D. Pérez 22 | | Pts: Suka-Umu 22; Rebs: Kale 7 Asts: Zengotitabengoa 6 PIR: Kale 25 |

Poliesportiu d'Andorra, Andorra la Vella
Referees: Uruñuela Uruñuela, Quintas Álvarez

=== Lucentum Alicante – Lobe Huesca ===
26 April 2013
21:00

Stats

| Lucentum Alicante | 73–59 | Lobe Huesca |
Scoring by quarter: 13–19, 16–11, 25–13, 19–16
| Pts: Huertas 14; Rebs: J. Fernández 10; Asts: Rejón 4 PIR: Coppenrath 14 | | Pts: E. Sánchez 12; Rebs: Čebular, Gatell 5 Asts: Abouo, J. Romero 3 PIR: E. Sánchez, Orfila 12 |

Centro de Tecnificación, Alicante
Referees: Carpallo Miguélez, Pinela García

28 April 2013
12:30

Stats

| Lucentum Alicante | 81–61 | Lobe Huesca |
Scoring by quarter: 19–18, 17–11, 20–24, 25–8
| Pts: Rivero 16; Rebs: J. Fernández 9 Asts: Green, Rivero 4 PIR: Rivero 21 | | Pts: Samuels 16; Rebs: Samuels 14; Asts: E. Sánchez 5 PIR: E. Sánchez 18 |

Centro de Tecnificación, Alicante
Referees: García León, R. Bey Silva

3 May 2013
21:00

Stats

| Lobe Huesca | 68–66 | Lucentum Alicante |
Scoring by quarter: 22–17, 12–14, 10–16, 24–19
| Pts: E. Sánchez 13; Rebs: Krušič, Samuels 6 Asts: Čebular 4 PIR: E. Sánchez 14 | | Pts: Coppenrath 17; Rebs: Green 9 Asts: Rivero 3 PIR: Llorca 20 |

Palacio de Deportes, Huesca
Referees: Pagán Baró, Mas Cagide

3 May 2013
21:00

Stats

| Lobe Huesca | 61–71 | Lucentum Alicante |
Scoring by quarter: 15–20, 15–19, 15–17, 16–15
| Pts: Samuels 16; Rebs: Samuels 8 Asts: Romero 4 PIR: Romero 20 | | Pts: Sàbat 22; Rebs: Green 7 Asts: Bas, J. Fernández 3 PIR: Sàbat 22 |

Centro de Tecnificación, Alicante
Referees: Vázquez García, Pazos Pazos

=== Palencia Baloncesto – Força Lleida CE ===
26 April 2013
21:00

Stats

| Palencia Baloncesto | 96–90 | Força Lleida CE |
Scoring by quarter: 19–26, 29–23, 20–25, 28–16
| Pts: Otegui 25; Rebs: Durley 7 Asts: Forcada 9 PIR: Otegui 33 | | Pts: Calegari 18; Rebs: Oriola 9 Asts: 3 players 4 PIR: Oriola 21 |

Marta Domínguez, Palencia
Referees: Uruñuela Uruñuela, Bravo Loroño

28 April 2013
19:30

Stats

| Palencia Baloncesto | 88–92 | Força Lleida CE |
Scoring by quarter: 16–17, 21–17, 23–25, 18–23
| Pts: Bravo 17; Rebs: Otegui 9 Asts: Durley, Forcada 4 PIR: Fornas 24 | | Pts: D. Rodríguez 28; Rebs: Pino 8 Asts: D. Rodríguez 4 PIR: D. Rodríguez 21 |

Marta Domínguez, Palencia
Referees: De Lucas de Lucas, Quintas Álvarez

3 May 2013
21:00

Stats

| Força Lleida CE | 72–66 | Palencia Baloncesto |
Scoring by quarter: 13–20, 12–15, 27–17, 20–14
| Pts: D. Rodríguez 17; Rebs: Bandoumel 11; Asts: D. Rodríguez 6 PIR: D. Rodríguez 20 | | Pts: Otegui 14; Rebs: Otegui 8 Asts: Fornas 4 PIR: Otegui 22 |

Barris Nord, Lleida
Referees: Morales García-Alcaide, López Herrada

5 May 2013
19:00

Stats

| Força Lleida CE | 62–75 | Palencia Baloncesto |
Scoring by quarter: 18–15, 14–19, 13–23, 17–18
| Pts: J. Johnson 16; Rebs: Oriola 5 Asts: 3 players 2 PIR: J. Johnson 18 | | Pts: Otegui 24; Rebs: Forcada 6 Asts: Garrido 5 PIR: Otegui 32 |

Barris Nord, Lleida
Referees: García León, Serrano Velázquez

7 May 2013
21:00

Stats

| Palencia Baloncesto | 82–71 | Força Lleida CE |
Scoring by quarter: 22–13, 16–15, 25–24, 19–19
| Pts: Otegui 17; Rebs: Otegui 11; Asts: Garrido 4 PIR: Fornas, Otegui 23 | | Pts: D. Rodríguez 18; Rebs: Oriola 10; Asts: Pino, D. Rodríguez 3 PIR: D. Rodríguez 20 |

Marta Domínguez, Palencia
Referees: Morales Ruiz, López Córdoba

=== CB Breogán – Cáceres Patrimonio de la Humanidad ===
26 April 2013
20:45

Stats

| CB Breogán | 88–95 | Cáceres Patrimonio de la Humanidad |
Scoring by quarter: 22–16, 22–29, 19–23, 25–27
| Pts: Winchester 31; Rebs: M. Gómez 6 Asts: Winchester 5 PIR: Winchester 34 | | Pts: Hobbs 19; Rebs: Ashaolu 7 Asts: Morentin 7 PIR: Hobbs 23 |

Pazo dos Deportes, Lugo
Referees: Vázquez García, Zamora Rodríguez

28 April 2013
19:00

Stats

| CB Breogán | 77–60 | Cáceres Patrimonio de la Humanidad |
Scoring by quarter: 15–16, 12–14, 25–12, 25–18
| Pts: Ogirri 20; Rebs: Schaftenaar 16; Asts: Ogirri 9 PIR: Schaftenaar 31 | | Pts: Morentin, Robles 13; Rebs: Duinker, Peña 5 Asts: Hobbs 4 PIR: Morentin 15 |

Pazo dos Deportes, Lugo
Referees: Zafra Guerra, Aliaga Solé

3 May 2013
21:00

Stats

| Cáceres Patrimonio de la Humanidad | 52–74 | CB Breogán |
Scoring by quarter: 16–27, 17–16, 11–18, 8–13
| Pts: Hobbs 10; Rebs: Peña 8 Asts: Hobbs, Peña 4 PIR: A. López 9 | | Pts: Ogirri 24; Rebs: Diouf, Schaftenaar 9 Asts: Schaftenaar 4 PIR: Winchester 19 |

Multiusos Ciudad de Cáceres, Cáceres
Referees: Garmendia Zorita, Rupérez Vielba

5 May 2013
19:00

Stats

| Cáceres Patrimonio de la Humanidad | 74–65 | CB Breogán |
Scoring by quarter: 13–21, 13–12, 20–14, 28–18
| Pts: Hobbs 15; Rebs: Morentin 9 Asts: Nguema 3 PIR: Hobbs 16 | | Pts: Diouf 16; Rebs: Diouf 18; Asts: Ogirri4; PIR: Diouf 32 |

Multiusos Ciudad de Cáceres, Cáceres
Referees: Morales Ruiz, Mas Cagide

7 May 2013
20:45

Stats

| CB Breogán | 72–75 | Cáceres Patrimonio de la Humanidad |
Scoring by quarter: 19–20, 18–16, 19–17, 16–22
| Pts: Winchester 24; Rebs: Schaftenaar 12; Asts: Ogirri 6 PIR: Schaftenaar 25 | | Pts: Hobbs 16; Rebs: 4 players 6 Asts: A. López 6 PIR: Hobbs 26 |

Pazo dos Deportes, Lugo
Referees: Pagán Baró, Serrano Velázquez

== Semifinals ==
=== River Andorra – Cáceres Patrimonio de la Humanidad ===
10 May 2013
21:00

Stats

| River Andorra | 71–68 | Cáceres Patrimonio de la Humanidad |
Scoring by quarter: 23–26, 19–15, 17–14, 12–13
| Pts: Blanch 13; Rebs: P. Sánchez 6 Asts: D. Pérez 4 PIR: P. Sánchez 12 | | Pts: Morentin 14; Rebs: Ashaolu 7 Asts: Morentin 4 PIR: Morentin 19 |

Poliesportiu d'Andorra, Andorra la Vella
Referees: De Lucas de Lucas, Carpallo Miguélez

12 May 2013
18:00

Stats

| River Andorra | 82–59 | Cáceres Patrimonio de la Humanidad |
Scoring by quarter: 23-16, 11-12, 24-16, 24-15
| Pts: Blanch 24; Rebs: Hampl 9 Asts: 2 players 6 PIR: Blanch 26 | | Pts: Z. Johnson 17; Rebs: 2 players 7 Asts: A. López 3 PIR: Morentin 14 |

Poliesportiu d'Andorra, Andorra la Vella
Referees: Zafra Guerra, López Herrada

17 May 2013
20:30

Stats

| Cáceres Patrimonio de la Humanidad | 73–56 | River Andorra |
Scoring by quarter: 33–9, 14–20, 3–13, 23–14
| Pts: Robles 14; Rebs: Ashaolu, Hobbs 7 Asts: Hobbs 9 PIR: Hobbs 21 | | Pts: Blanch 11; Rebs: Safford 9 Asts: Galera, Schreiner 3 PIR: Blanch 14 |

Multiusos Ciudad de Cáceres, Cáceres
Referees: Palenzuela Pastrana, Bravo Loroño

19 May 2013
20:00

Stats

| Cáceres Patrimonio de la Humanidad | 70–82 | River Andorra |
Scoring by quarter: 14–32, 16–17, 24–14, 16–19
| Pts: Ashaolu 17; Rebs: Peña 8 Asts: Nguema 2 PIR: Ashaolu 23 | | Pts: Blanch 22; Rebs: Flis, P. Sánchez 8 Asts: Schreiner 5 PIR: Blanch 26 |

Multiusos Ciudad de Cáceres, Cáceres
Referees: Morales Gª Alcaide, López Córdoba

=== Lucentum Alicante – Palencia Baloncesto ===
10 May 2013
21:00

Stats

| Lucentum Alicante | 86–75 | Palencia Baloncesto |
Scoring by quarter: 25–16, 18–22, 24–14, 19–23
| Pts: Sàbat 17; Rebs: Coppenrath 10; Asts: Rejón 5 PIR: Sàbat 18 | | Pts: Durley 16; Rebs: Fornas 10; Asts: Forcada 4 PIR: Durley 18 |

Centro de Tecnificación, Alicante
Referees: Garmendia Zorita, Aliaga Solé

12 May 2013
12:30

Stats

| Lucentum Alicante | 81–74 | Palencia Baloncesto |
Scoring by quarter: 19–19, 13–15, 26–24, 23–16
| Pts: Green 22; Rebs: Green, Llorca 8 Asts: Rejón 5 PIR: Green 31 | | Pts: Bravo 18; Rebs: Durley 6 Asts: Forcada 6 PIR: Bravo 19 |

Centro de Tecnificación, Alicante
Referees: Vázquez García, Mas Cagide

17 May 2013
21:00

Stats

| Palencia Baloncesto | 76–81 | Lucentum Alicante |
Scoring by quarter: 29–27, 17–14, 14–18, 16–22
| Pts: Durley 16; Rebs: Durley 10; Asts: Bravo 6 PIR: Porziņģis 24 | | Pts: Rejón 14; Rebs: Llorca, Rejón 7 Asts: J. Fernández 3 PIR: Rejón 19 |

Marta Domínguez, Palencia
Referees: Afonso Castillo, Zamora Rodríguez

== Final ==
=== River Andorra – Lucentum Alicante ===
24 May 2013
21:00

Stats

| River Andorra | 87–85 | Lucentum Alicante |
Scoring by quarter: 22–17, 22–23, 29–23, 14–22
| Pts: Blanch 23; Rebs: Schreiner 7 Asts: Schreiner 3 PIR: Flis 21 | | Pts: Llorca 14; Rebs: J. Fernández, Green 5 Asts: Rivero 5 PIR: Coppenrath 16 |

Poliesportiu d'Andorra, Andorra la Vella
Referees: Uruñuela Uruñuela, Bravo Loroño

26 May 2013
19:00

Stats

| River Andorra | 69–91 | Lucentum Alicante |
Scoring by quarter: 17–18, 17–32, 22–21, 13–20
| Pts: Blanch 23; Rebs: Blanch 9 Asts: Schreiner 3 PIR: Blanch 30 | | Pts: Sàbat 21; Rebs: Llorca, Rejón 8 Asts: Rivero 4 PIR: Huertas 20 |

Poliesportiu d'Andorra, Andorra la Vella
Referees: García León, López Córdoba

31 May 2013
21:00

Stats

| Lucentum Alicante | 71–70 | River Andorra |
Scoring by quarter: 18–16, 12–14, 20–23, 21–17
| Pts: Bas 17; Rebs: Coppenrath 6 Asts: Rejón 4 PIR: Rivero 15 | | Pts: Blanch 26; Rebs: Hampl, Wright 4 Asts: Maresch 5 PIR: Blanch 20 |

Centro de Tecnificación de Alicante, Alicante
Referees: De Lucas de Lucas, Palenzuela Pastrana

2 June 2013
20:00

Stats

| Lucentum Alicante | 60–77 | River Andorra |
Scoring by quarter: 6-15, 19-18, 15-25, 20-19
| Pts: Coppenrath 15; Rebs: Green 7 Asts: Rejón 3 PIR: Coppenrath 20 | | Pts: Blanch 23; Rebs: P. Sánchez 8 Asts: Blanch, Schreiner 2 PIR: Blanch 21 |

Centro de Tecnificación de Alicante, Alicante
Referees: Garmendia Zorita, Serrano Velázquez

6 June 2013
21:00

Stats

| River Andorra | 71–95 | Lucentum Alicante |
Scoring by quarter: 15–21, 27–32, 7–22, 22–20
| Pts: Schreiner 18; Rebs: Flis, Wright 4 Asts: Schreiner 4 PIR: Schreiner 21 | | Pts: Huertas 22; Rebs: Sàbat 6 Asts: Rejón, Sàbat 4 PIR: Huertas 19 |

Poliesportiu d'Andorra, Andorra la Vella
Referees: Afonso Castillo, Morales García-Alcaide
