= 2012–13 LEB Oro season =

- League: LEB Oro
- Sport: Basketball
- Games: 182 (regular season)
- Teams: 14
- TV partner(s): Teledeporte; FEB TV (online)

Regular Season
- Season champions: Ford Burgos
- Season MVP: (Czech Republic) Ondřej Starosta
- Top scorer: (Spain) Francis Sánchez

Playoffs
- Playoffs champions: Lucentum Alicante
- Playoffs runners-up: River Andorra

Copa Príncipe
- Champions: Ford Burgos
- Runners-up: River Andorra
- Finals MVP: (Spain) Isaac López

LEB Oro seasons
- ← 2011–12 2013–14 →

The 2012–13 LEB Oro season was the 17th season of the Liga Española de Baloncesto, a Spanish basketball league. It was named Adecco Oro as its sponsored identity. The champion of the regular season would be promoted to Liga ACB. The teams between second and ninth position will play a best of five games play off, where the winner would be promoted too to the higher division.

== Competition format ==
=== Eligibility of players ===
All teams must have in their roster:

- A minimum of six players who played in Spain during three season being between 15 and 20 years old.
- A maximum of two non-EU players. This players can be replaced by players from the EU or ACP countries.
- A maximum of three players from the EU or ACP countries.

Teams can not sign any player after February 28, 2012.

=== Regular season ===
Each team of every division has to play with all the other teams of its division twice, once at home and the other at the opponent's stadium.

Like many other leagues in continental Europe, the Liga LEB takes a winter break once each team has played half its schedule. One feature of the league that may be unusual to North American observers is that the two halves of the season are played in the same order—that is, the order of each team's first-half fixtures is repeated in the second half of the season, with the only difference being the arenas used. This procedure is typical in Europe; it is also used by La Liga in football.

Since the first round of the second leg, if two or more teams have accumulated the same number of winning games, the criteria of tie-breaking are these:

1. Head-to-head winning games.
2. Head-to-head points coefficient.
3. Total points coefficient.

After the first leg of the season, the two top qualified teams will play the Copa Príncipe de Asturias and the leader will be the host team.

At the final of the season:

- The regular season winner promotes directly to Liga ACB.
- Teams qualified between 2nd and 9th, will join the promotion play-offs to ACB.
- Teams qualified in positions 12th and 13th will play the relegation playoffs.
- Team qualified in last position is relegated directly to LEB Plata.

== Team information ==
New teams in the league:

- Lucentum Alicante (sold its berth in Liga ACB to CB Canarias)
- River Andorra (promoted as 2011–12 LEB Plata champion)
- Club Ourense Baloncesto (promoted as 2011–12 LEB Plata runner-up)
- FC Barcelona Regal B (achieved a vacant berth in the league)
- Leyma Natura Básquet Coruña (achieved a vacant berth in the league)
- Força Lleida CE (new creation team, achieved a vacant berth in the league)

Teams that left the league:

- CB Canarias (promoted to Liga ACB as champion of 2011–12 LEB Oro, bought Lucentum Alicante's spot)
- Menorca Bàsquet (dissolved after its promotion to Liga ACB as 2011–12 LEB Oro runner-up)
- Lleida Basquetbol (will not join any competition)
- UB La Palma (dissolved)
- CB Sant Josep Girona (will play in Liga EBA)
- Bàsquet Mallorca (will play in Liga EBA)
- Baloncesto León (dissolved)
- CB Tarragona (will play in Liga EBA)
- Clínicas Rincón (relegated to LEB Plata)
- CB Granada (dissolved after its relegation to LEB Plata)

Team	City	Arena	Capacity	Founded	Head coach
Cáceres Patrimonio de la Humanidad	Cáceres	Multiusos Ciudad de Cáceres	6,500	2007	(Spain) Carlos Frade
CB Breogán	Lugo	Pazo Provincial Dos Deportes	6,500	1966	(Spain) Lisardo Gómez
Club Melilla Baloncesto	Melilla	Pabellón Javier Imbroda Ortiz	3,800	1991	(Spain) Gonzalo García de Vitoria
Club Ourense Baloncesto	Ourense	Pazo dos Deportes Paco Paz	5,000	1979	(Spain) Rafa Sanz
FC Barcelona Regal B	Barcelona	Palau Blaugrana	7,500	1926	(Spain) Borja Comenge
Força Lleida CE	Lleida	Pavelló Barris Nord	6,100	2012	(Spain) Joaquín Prado
Ford Burgos	Burgos	Polideportivo El Plantío	3,150	1997	(Spain) Andreu Casadevall
Knet	Logroño	Palacio de los Deportes	3,851	1967	(Spain) Jesús Sala
Leyma Natura Básquet Coruña	A Coruña	Polideportivo de Riazor	3,500	1995	(Spain) Antonio Pérez
Lobe Huesca	Huesca	Palacio Municipal de Huesca	5,018	1977	(Spain) Quim Costa
Lucentum Alicante	Alicante	Centro de Tecnificación de Alicante	5,425	1994	(Spain) Rubén Perelló
Palencia Baloncesto	Palencia	Pabellón Marta Domínguez	1,806	1979	(Spain) Natxo Lezkano
Planasa Navarra	Pamplona	Polideportivo Anaitasuna	3,000	2006	(Spain) Ángel Jareño
River Andorra	Andorra La Vella	Poliesportiu d'Andorra	1,784	1970	(Spain) Joan Peñarroya

== Managerial changes ==
=== Before the start of the season ===
Team	Outgoing manager	Manner of departure	Replaced by	Date of appointment
Cáceres Patrimonio de la Humanidad	(Spain) Gustavo Aranzana	End of contract	(Spain) Carlos Frade	July 11, 2012
Lucentum Alicante	(Spain) Txus Vidorreta	End of contract	(Spain) Josep Maria Berrocal	July 25, 2012
Força Lleida CE	Vacant berth		(Spain) Joaquín Prado	August 14, 2012

=== During the season ===
Team	Outgoing manager	Manner of departure	Date of vacancy	Replaced by	Date of appointment	Position in the table
Lucentum Alicante	(Spain) Josep Maria Berrocal	Signed by BC Donetsk	October 24, 2012	(Spain) Rubén Perelló	October 24, 2012	10th (1–2)
CB Breogán	(Spain) Pepe Rodríguez	Sacked	December 17, 2012	(Spain) Lisardo Gómez	December 17, 2012	6th (6–5)

== Regular season ==
=== League table ===
#	Teams	P	W	L	PF	PA	PT	Qualification or relegation
1	Ford Burgos (C)	26	22	4	2163	1831	48	Promotion to Liga ACB
2	River Andorra	26	22	4	2080	1860	48	Promotion playoffs
3	Lucentum Alicante	26	18	8	2066	1883	44	Promotion playoffs
4	Palencia Baloncesto	26	15	11	2078	2054	41	Promotion playoffs
5	CB Breogán	26	14	12	1845	1805	40	Promotion playoffs
6	Cáceres Patrimonio de la Humanidad	26	12	14	1921	1980	38	Promotion playoffs
7	Força Lleida CE	26	11	15	1929	1943	37	Promotion playoffs
8	Lobe Huesca	26	11	15	1874	1946	37	Promotion playoffs
9	Leyma Natura Básquet Coruña	26	11	15	1841	1879	37	Promotion playoffs
10	FC Barcelona Regal B	26	11	15	1971	2130	37	
11	Planasa Navarra	26	10	16	1897	2050	36	
12	Knet	26	10	16	2008	2048	36	Relegation playoffs
13	Club Ourense Baloncesto	26	9	17	1890	2035	35	Relegation playoffs
14	Club Melilla Baloncesto	26	6	20	2027	2146	32	Relegation to LEB Plata

(C) = Copa Príncipe de Asturias champion

=== Positions by round ===
Team\Round																										
	01	02	03	04	05	06	07	08	09	10	11	12	13	14	15	16	17	18	19	20	21	22	23	24	25	26
Ford Burgos	3	1	4	6	4	3	2	2	2	2	2	2	1	1	1	2	2	2	2	2	2	2	2	2	2	1
River Andorra	7	3	2	2	2	1	1	1	1	1	1	1	2	2	2	1	1	1	1	1	1	1	1	1	1	2
Lucentum Alicante	6	11	10	8	5	5	4	3	3	3	3	3	3	3	3	3	4	3	3	3	3	3	3	3	3	3
Palencia Baloncesto	1	4	3	3	3	4	5	4	5	5	4	5	4	4	4	4	3	4	4	4	4	4	4	4	4	4
CB Breogán	4	7	7	4	6	7	6	6	4	4	6	4	5	6	7	5	5	5	5	5	5	5	5	5	5	5
Cáceres Patrimonio de la Humanidad	13	10	12	12	12	11	10	10	10	12	11	12	11	7	10	9	8	9	9	11	7	10	11	7	6	6
Força Lleida CE	12	13	9	11	9	10	11	11	9	9	8	8	8	8	5	6	10	10	8	10	6	9	6	6	7	7
Lobe Huesca	8	12	13	13	14	13	13	12	12	11	12	10	10	9	8	7	9	11	10	6	9	6	7	10	8	8
Leyma Natura Básquet Coruña	5	2	1	1	1	2	3	5	7	7	5	6	7	10	9	12	7	12	13	13	12	12	13	11	9	9
FC Barcelona Regal B	11	6	6	5	8	6	7	7	8	8	10	11	12	12	12	11	12	8	6	8	10	7	9	9	10	10
Planasa Navarra	10	8	11	9	7	9	9	9	11	10	9	9	9	5	6	8	6	6	7	9	11	11	10	12	11	11
Knet	9	9	5	7	10	8	8	8	6	6	7	7	6	11	11	10	11	7	11	7	8	8	8	8	12	12
Club Ourense Baloncesto	14	14	14	14	13	14	14	14	13	14	14	14	14	13	13	13	13	13	12	12	13	13	12	13	13	13
Club Melilla Baloncesto	2	5	8	10	11	12	12	13	14	13	13	13	13	14	14	14	14	14	14	14	14	14	14	14	14	14

=== Results ===
	CÁC	BREO	MEL	COB	FCB	LLE	BUR	KNET	COR	LOBE	LUC	PAL	NAV	BCA
Cáceres Patrimonio de la Humanidad		71–65	74–65	85–76	85–71	81–76	75–81	72–70	66–63	84–76	65–64	83–72	69–75	69–71
CB Breogán	69–64		93–80	78–77	79–73	83–68	63–61	85–56	61–46	63–49	73–80	69–64	76–78	66–77
Club Melilla Baloncesto	95–78	57–64		76–75	103–104	89–86	76–92	91–70	75–80	76–79	66–84	84–91	88–73	72–79
Club Ourense Baloncesto	81–73	74–66	81–84		66–65	72–77	74–68	66–74	70–58	82–78	76–72	68–93	86–83	63–84
FC Barcelona Regal B	92–83	75–58	83–78	81–66		65–76	65–90	65–60	67–66	77–82	88–78	77–104	89–85	75–104
Força Lleida CE	83–70	76–65	87–70	79–64	83–76		52–67	90–71	68–75	72–58	66–79	51–57	90–61	67–76
Ford Burgos	91–88	77–85	85–79	98–76	87–72	81–62		87–72	92–52	93–82	64–69	101–75	91–61	76–68
Knet	70–57	77–69	86–82	75–71	94–74	95–73	82–83		80–83	65–79	75–76	97–87	95–89	79–72
Leyma Natura Básquet Coruña	91–67	69–71	81–72	70–57	93–56	73–80	75–84	79–72		70–62	73–81	63–69	77–73	57–71
Lobe Huesca	69–73	43–71	98–88	85–68	77–80	74–73	70–79	66–63	81–65		61–64	82–80	74–67	81–82
Lucentum Alicante	72–74	70–60	77–64	93–83	92–77	92–71	66–69	118–115	81–65	85–53		77–59	84–62	77–79
Palencia Baloncesto	87–84	77–67	82–73	73–75	95–87	67–61	62–93	84–81	76–85	87–75	72–78		86–80	74–82
Planasa Navarra	71–67	76–60	75–67	85–83	70–76	78–73	55–87	71–60	74–70	59–68	89–77	77–98		77–81
River Andorra	84–64	90–86	89–77	81–60	74–61	86–66	75–86	79–74	73–61	80–72	84–80	81–87	78–53	

== Copa Príncipe de Asturias ==
At the half of the league, the two first teams in the table play the Copa Príncipe de Asturias at home of the winner of the first half season (17th round). If this team doesn't want to host the Copa Príncipe, the second qualified can do it. If nobody wants to host it, the Federation will propose a neutral venue.

The Champion of this Cup joined the play-offs as first qualified if it finishes the league between the 2nd and the 5th qualified. The Copa Príncipe was played on February 1, 2013.

=== Teams qualified ===
#	Teams	P	W	L	PF	PA	PT
1	Ford Burgos	13	11	2	1090	933	24
2	River Andorra	13	11	2	1064	980	24

=== The game ===
Teledeporte

1 February 2013
20:00

Report
Stats

Ford Burgos	73–67	River Andorra
Scoring by quarter: 17–14, 20–15, 11–10, 25–28
Pts: I. López 17; Rebs: Sikma 7 Asts: D. López 5 PIR: I. López 17		Pts: Blanch 15; Rebs: Flis 9 Asts: Pérez, Schreiner 9 PIR: Wright 17
Ford Burgos, champion of the Copa Príncipe de Asturias

El Plantío, Burgos
Attendance: 3,000
Referees: Garmendia Zorita, García León, López Córdoba

== Playoffs ==
=== Promotion playoffs ===
Quarterfinals; April 26, 28, May 3, 5, 7
2	River Andorra	81	100	56	84	109
9	Leyma Natura Básquet Coruña	88	75	67	69	94
5	CB Breogán	88	77	74	65	72
6	Cáceres Patrimonio de la Humanidad	95	60	52	74	75
3	Lucentum Alicante	73	81	66	71	X
8	Lobe Huesca	59	61	68	61	X
4	Palencia Baloncesto	96	78	66	75	82
7	Força Lleida CE	90	82	72	62	71

Semifinals; May 10, 12, 17, 19, 21
2	River Andorra	71	82	56	82	X
6	Cáceres Patrimonio de la Humanidad	68	59	73	70	X
3	Lucentum Alicante	86	81	81	X	X
4	Palencia Baloncesto	75	74	76	X	X

Finals; May 24, 26, 31, June 2, 4
2	River Andorra	87	69	70	77	71
3	Lucentum Alicante	85	91	71	60	95

=== Relegation playoffs ===
The loser of a best-of-five series will be relegated to LEB Plata.

Relegation playoffs April 26, 28, May 3, 5, 7
12	Knet	57	76	58	65	85
13	Club Ourense Baloncesto	74	59	67	64	65

== Stats leaders in regular season ==
=== Points ===
Rk	Name	Team	Games	Points	PPG
1	(Spain) Francis Sánchez	Club Melilla Baloncesto	26	409	15.7
2	(Czech Republic) Ondřej Starosta	Planasa Navarra	26	404	15.5
3	(United States) Nick Barbour	Club Ourense Baloncesto	26	399	15.3
4	(United States) Anthony Winchester	CB Breogán	25	385	15.3
5	(Spain) Asier Zengotitabengoa	Leyma Natura Básquet Coruña	26	387	14.9

=== Rebounds ===
Rk	Name	Team	Games	Rebounds	RPG
1	(Czech Republic) Ondřej Starosta	Planasa Navarra	26	255	9.8
2	(United States) Kiril Wachsmann	Club Melilla Baloncesto	26	231	8.9
3	(United States) Luke Sikma	Ford Burgos	25	203	8.1
4	(Senegal) Michel Diouf	CB Breogán	25	197	7.9
5	(United States) Jamar Samuels	Lobe Huesca	25	190	7.6

=== Assists ===
Rk	Name	Team	Games	Assists	APG
1	(Spain) Dani Pérez	River Andorra	26	143	5.5
2	(Spain) Mikel Úriz	Knet	25	124	4.9
3	(Spain) Dani Rodríguez	Força Lleida	26	127	4.9
4	(Spain) José Antonio Marco	Club Melilla Baloncesto	25	118	4.7
5	(Spain) Dani López	Ford Burgos	26	111	4.3

=== Performance Index Rating ===
Rk	Name	Team	Games	Rating	PIR
1	(Czech Republic) Ondřej Starosta	Planasa Navarra	26	565	21.7
2	(Spain) Urko Otegui	Palencia Baloncesto	26	484	18.6
3	(United States) Taylor Coppenrath	Lucentum Alicante	26	477	18.3
4	(United States) Luke Sikma	Ford Burgos	25	414	16.5
5	(United States) Jamar Samuels	Lobe Huesca	25	390	15.6

== Awards and trophies ==
=== All LEB Oro team ===
- (Spain) Mikel Uriz (Knet)
- (United States) Anthony Winchester (CB Breogán)
- (Spain) Marc Blanch (River Andorra)
- (Spain) Urko Otegui (Palencia Baloncesto)
- (Czech Republic) Ondřej Starosta (Planasa Navarra)

=== MVP of the regular season ===
- (Czech Republic) Ondřej Starosta (Planasa Navarra)

=== Coach of the season ===
- (Spain) Andreu Casadevall (Ford Burgos)

=== LEB Oro Rising star ===
- (Croatia) Mario Hezonja (FC Barcelona Regal B)

=== MVP week by week ===
==== Regular season ====
Day	Name	Team	PIR
1	(United States) Taylor Coppenrath	Lucentum Alicante	49
2	(United States) Luke Sikma	Ford Burgos	25
3	(Spain) José Amador	Club Melilla Baloncesto	27
4	(Nigeria) Andy Ogide	Club Ourense Baloncesto	30
5	(United States) Taylor Coppenrath (2)	Lucentum Alicante (2)	38
6	(Spain) Mario Cabanas	Planasa Navarra	30
7	(United States) Jamar Samuels	Lobe Huesca	28
7	(Germany) Kiril Wachsmann	Club Melilla Baloncesto (2)	28
8	(Spain) Adrián Fuentes	Lobe Huesca (2)	36
9	(United States) Dominic Calegari	Força Lleida CE	31
10	(Spain) Iñaki Narros	Planasa Navarra (2)	36
11	(United States) Jamar Samuels (2)	Lobe Huesca (3)	33
12	(United States) Luke Sikma (2)	Ford Burgos (2)	39
13	(United States) Jamar Samuels (3)	Lobe Huesca (4)	50
14	(Czech Republic) Ondřej Starosta	Planasa Navarra (3)	32
15	(United States) Taylor Coppenrath (3)	Lucentum Alicante (3)	33
16	(Czech Republic) Ondřej Starosta (2)	Planasa Navarra (4)	34
17	(Senegal) Michel Diouf	CB Breogán	28
17	(Spain) Urko Otegui	Palencia Baloncesto	28
18	(Canada) Olu Ashaolu	Cáceres Patrimonio de la Humanidad	30
19	(United States) Chris Mortellaro	Palencia Baloncesto (2)	27
20	(Spain) Urko Otegui (2)	Palencia Baloncesto (3)	33
20	(United States) Jamar Samuels (4)	Lobe Huesca (5)	33
21	(Spain) Pierre Oriola	Força Lleida CE (2)	29
22	(United States) Taylor Coppenrath (4)	Lucentum Alicante (4)	36
23	(Spain) Urko Otegui (3)	Palencia Baloncesto (4)	34
24	(Senegal) Michel Diouf (2)	CB Breogán (2)	29
25	(Spain) Dani López	Ford Burgos (3)	27
26	(Czech Republic) Ondřej Starosta (3)	Planasa Navarra (5)	33

==== Playoffs ====
Day	Name	Team	PIR
QF1	(United States) Anthony Winchester	CB Breogán (3)	31
QF2	(Spain) Marc Blanch	River Andorra	35
QF3	(Spain) Eduardo Hernández-Sonseca	Leyma Natura Básquet Coruña (4)	30
QF4	(Senegal) Michel Diouf (3)	CB Breogán	32
QF4	(Spain) Urko Otegui (4)	Palencia Baloncesto (5)	32
QF5	(United States) Braydon Hobbs	Cáceres Patrimonio de la Humanidad (2)	26
SF1	(Spain) Roberto Morentin	Cáceres Patrimonio de la Humanidad (3)	19
SF2	(United States) Shaun Green	Lucentum Alicante (5)	31
SF3	(Latvia) Jānis Porziņģis	Palencia Baloncesto (6)	24
SF4	(Spain) Marc Blanch (2)	River Andorra (2)	26
F1	(Russia) Dmitry Flis	River Andorra (3)	21
