= 2021 WPT Alicante Open =

World Padel Tour tournament held in Alicante, Spain

- Date: 19 – 25 April
- Edition: 14th (Note: The first seven editions were held under the organization of the Padel Pro Tour.)
- Category: Open
- Location: Alicante, Spain
- Venue: Pabellón Pedro Ferrándiz

Champions
- Men's doubles: (Spain) Alejandro Galán (Spain) Juan Lebrón
- Women's doubles: (Spain) Alejandra Salazar (Spain) Gemma Triay

Chronology

The 2021 Alicante Open (officially 2021 World Padel Tour Estrella Damm Alicante Open) was the second tournament of the ninth season organized by World Padel Tour, the most prestigious padel circuit at the time.

In the women's category, the top two ranked pairs both reached the final for the first match of the season. The first finalists were the number one ranked pair, Alejandra Salazar and Gemma Triay, who eliminated Aranzazu Osoro and Victoria Iglesias in the semi-final. Their opponents in the final were the second ranked pair, Ariana Sánchez and Paula Josemaria, who eliminated the fourth ranked pair, Bea González and Lucia Sainz, to reach the final. In the final, Gemma and Salazar easily defeated Ariana and Paula to win their first title of the season and their first as a pair. With this victory, Gemma successfully defended the title she won in the previous season, while Salazar won her third (having already won in 2018 and 2019).

In the men's category, the first and sixth-ranked pairs reached the final. The first finalists were the world number ones, Alejandro Galán and Juan Lebrón, who defeated Federico Chingotto and Juan Tello in the semifinals. Their opponents were the sixth-ranked pair, Alejandro Ruiz and Franco Stupaczuk, who after defeating the second-ranked team, Fernando Belasteguín and Sanyo Gutiérrez, in the quarterfinals, defeated Arturo Coello and Miguel Lamperti to reach the final. In the final, Galán and Lebrón defeated Ruiz and Stupaczuk in two sets to win their first title of the season. With this victory, they also successfully defended the title won in the previous season, with this being Galán's second in Alicante and Lebrón's third (who had already won with Paquito Navarro in 2019).

== Head-to-head record between teams ranked in the top 4 during the season ==
=== Men's ===
Record	Galán–Lebrón	Belasteguín–Sanyo	Lima–Tapia	Di Nenno–Paquito
Galán–Lebrón	—	—	—	—
Belasteguín–Sanyo	—	—	—	—
Lima–Tapia	—	—	—	—
Di Nenno–Paquito	—	—	—	—

=== Women's ===
Record	Gemma–Salazar	Ariana–Josemaria	Marrero–Ortega	Bea–Lucia
Gemma–Salazar	—	1–0	—	0–1
Ariana–Josemaria	0–1	—	—	2–0
Marrero–Ortega	—	—	—	—
Bea–Lucia	1–0	0–2	—	—

== Draws ==
=== Men's Bracket ===
Round of 32
1	(Spain) Galán / (Spain) Lebrón
Bye
(Argentina) A. Gutiérrez / (Spain) J. Martinez	7	7
(Spain) N. Gadea / (Spain) V. Ruiz	6	6
Q	(Spain) J.G. Diestro / (Spain) P. Fernández	6	2	3
(Spain) Coki / (Spain) J.M. Díaz	2	6	6
Q	(Spain) J. Leal / (Spain) M. Semmler	2	6	0
7	(Spain) J. Ruiz / (Spain) U. Botello	6	1	6
5	(Argentina) Chingotto / (Argentina) J. Tello	6	7
(Brazil) L. Bergamini / (Brazil) L. Campagnolo	4	6
(Spain) J. Rico / (Spain) Momo	6	7
(Spain) J. Rico / (Argentina) R. Moyano	4	6
(Spain) Á. Cepero / (Spain) J. Mieres	2	7	6
(Spain) J. Barahona / (Spain) M. Piñeiro	6	5	3
Bye
4	(Argentina) Di Nenno / (Spain) Paquito
3	(Brazil) Lima / (Argentina) Tapia
Bye
(Argentina) A. Allemandi / (Spain) P. Lijó	6	6	4
(Spain) C. Fuster / (Spain) G. Rubio	7	4	6
(Argentina) D. Perino / (Spain) E. Moreno	4	5
(Spain) Coello / (Argentina) M. Lamperti	6	7
(Spain) F. Gil Morales / (Spain) S. Alba	7	6	7
8	(Argentina) L. Capra / (Argentina) Maxi	6	7	5
6	(Spain) A. Ruiz / (Argentina) Stupaczuk	*
Q	(Spain) R. Méndez / (Spain) S. Oria
(Spain) I. Ramírez / (Spain) M. Yanguas	1	4
(Argentina) A. Silingo / (Spain) M. Díaz	6	6
Q	(Argentina) A. Patiniotis / (Spain) J. Sanz	6	0	7
(Spain) J. Garrido / (Argentina) J.C. Belluati	4	6	6
Bye
2	(Argentina) Belasteguín / (Argentina) Sanyo

Round of 16
1	(Spain) Galán / (Spain) Lebrón	6	6
(Argentina) A. Gutiérrez / (Spain) J. Martinez	3	2
(Spain) Coki / (Spain) J.M. Díaz	2	7	6
7	(Spain) J. Ruiz / (Spain) U. Botello	6	6	4
5	(Argentina) Chingotto / (Argentina) J. Tello	2	6	6
(Spain) J. Rico / (Spain) Momo	6	1	2
(Spain) Á. Cepero / (Spain) J. Mieres	1	2
4	(Argentina) Di Nenno / (Spain) Paquito	6	6
3	(Brazil) Lima / (Argentina) Tapia	7	6
(Spain) C. Fuster / (Spain) G. Rubio	5	3
(Spain) Coello / (Argentina) M. Lamperti	7	6
8	(Spain) F. Gil Morales / (Spain) S. Alba	5	4
6	(Spain) A. Ruiz / (Argentina) Stupaczuk	6	6
(Argentina) A. Silingo / (Spain) M. Díaz	2	2
(Argentina) A. Patiniotis / (Spain) J. Sanz	5	4
2	(Argentina) Belasteguín / (Argentina) Sanyo	7	6

Quarter-Final
1	(Spain) Galán / (Spain) Lebrón	6	6
(Spain) Coki / (Spain) J.M. Díaz	3	0
5	(Argentina) Chingotto / (Argentina) J. Tello	6	6
4	(Argentina) Di Nenno / (Spain) Paquito	2	3
3	(Brazil) Lima / (Argentina) Tapia	7	5	4
(Spain) Coello / (Argentina) M. Lamperti	6	7	6
6	(Spain) A. Ruiz / (Argentina) Stupaczuk	7	7
2	(Argentina) Belasteguín / (Argentina) Sanyo	6	5

Semi-Finals
1	(Spain) Galán / (Spain) Lebrón	6	6
5	(Argentina) Chingotto / (Argentina) J. Tello	2	2
(Spain) Coello / (Argentina) M. Lamperti	0	5
6	(Spain) A. Ruiz / (Argentina) Stupaczuk	6	7

Finals
1	(Spain) Galán / (Spain) Lebrón	6	6
6	(Spain) A. Ruiz / (Argentina) Stupaczuk	0	4

=== Women's Bracket ===
Round of 32
1	(Spain) Gemma / (Spain) Salazar
Bye
(Argentina) N. Brito / (Spain) N. Traviesa	5	1
(Spain) L. Martínez / (Spain) V. Virseda	7	6
Q	(Argentina) C. Jensen / (Spain) Sandra Bellver	7	7
(Spain) A. Blanco / (Spain) M. Merino	5	6
(Spain) B. Las Heras / (Spain) C. Mesa	6	6
6	(Spain) E. Amatriain / (Portugal) S. Araújo	3	4
7	(Portugal) A.C. Nogueira / (Spain) T. Navarro	4	3
(Argentina) A. Osoro / (Spain) V. Iglesias	6	6
Q	(Spain) A. Cantin / (Spain) A. Soriano	6	6
(Spain) I. Domínguez / (Spain) L. Alonso	4	4
(Argentina) C. Tenorio / (Argentina) J. Bidahorria	6	6
Q	(Spain) C. García / (Spain) M. Caparros	3	1
Bye
3	(Spain) M. Marrero / (Spain) M. Ortega
4	(Spain) Bea González / (Spain) L. Sainz
Bye
(Spain) B. Caldera / (Spain) C. Goenaga	5	3
(France) A. Collombon / (Spain) J. Castelló	7	6
(Argentina) D. Brea / (Spain) T. Icardo	6	6
(Spain) N. Vivancos / (Spain) X. Clasca	3	2
(Spain) A. Galán / (Spain) M. Villalba	1	4
5	(Spain) P. Llaguno / (Argentina) V. Riera
8	(Spain) C. Navarro / (Argentina) C. Reiter	2	4
(Spain) E. Carnicero / (Brazil) R. Piltcher	6	6
(Spain) L. Rufo / (Spain) M. Talavan	6	6
Q	(Spain) A. Cañellas / (France) L. Godallier	3	4
(Spain) A. Martínez / (Spain) S. Hernández	4	1
(Spain) A. Cortiles / (Spain) A.F. de Ossó	6	6
Bye
2	(Spain) Ariana / (Spain) P. Josemaria

Round of 16
1	(Spain) Gemma / (Spain) Salazar	6	6
(Spain) L. Martínez / (Spain) V. Virseda	2	1
Q	(Argentina) C. Jensen / (Spain) Sandra Bellver	1	3
(Spain) B. Las Heras / (Spain) C. Mesa	6	6
(Argentina) A. Osoro / (Spain) V. Iglesias	6	7
(Spain) A. Cantin / (Spain) A. Soriano	3	6
(Argentina) C. Tenorio / (Argentina) J. Bidahorria	4	0
3	(Spain) M. Marrero / (Spain) M. Ortega	6	6
4	(Spain) Bea González / (Spain) L. Sainz	6	6
(France) A. Collombon / (Spain) J. Castelló	1	4
(Argentina) D. Brea / (Spain) T. Icardo	3	2
5	(Spain) P. Llaguno / (Argentina) V. Riera	6	6
(Spain) E. Carnicero / (Brazil) R. Piltcher	4	4
(Spain) L. Rufo / (Spain) M. Talavan	6	6
(Spain) A. Cortiles / (Spain) A.F. de Ossó	0	1
2	(Spain) Ariana / (Spain) P. Josemaria	6	6

Quarter-Final
1	(Spain) Gemma / (Spain) Salazar	6	6
(Spain) B. Las Heras / (Spain) C. Mesa	0	2
(Argentina) A. Osoro / (Spain) V. Iglesias	6	6
3	(Spain) M. Marrero / (Spain) M. Ortega	4	4
4	(Spain) Bea González / (Spain) L. Sainz	7	1	*
5	(Spain) P. Llaguno / (Argentina) V. Riera	6	2
(Spain) L. Rufo / (Spain) M. Talavan	4	4
2	(Spain) Ariana / (Spain) P. Josemaria	6	6

Semi-Finals
1	(Spain) Gemma / (Spain) Salazar	6	6
(Argentina) A. Osoro / (Spain) V. Iglesias	3	3
4	(Spain) Bea González / (Spain) L. Sainz	3	6
2	(Spain) Ariana / (Spain) P. Josemaria	6	7

Finals
1	(Spain) Gemma / (Spain) Salazar	6	6
2	(Spain) Ariana / (Spain) P. Josemaria	0	1

== Results ==
=== Round of 32 ===
Men's
Date	Winners	Score	Opponent	Ref.
21/4/2021	(Argentina) Agustín Gutiérrez (Spain) Javier Martinez Vázquez	7–6 / 7–6	(Spain) Nacho Gadea (Spain) Víctor Ruiz	
21/4/2021	(Spain) Coki Nieto (Spain) Juan Martín Díaz	2–6 / 6–2 / 6–3	(Spain) José García Diestro (Spain) Pincho Fernández	
21/4/2021	(Spain) Javier Ruiz (Spain) Uri Botello	6–2 / 1–6 / 6–0	(Spain) Javi Leal (Spain) Miguel Semmler	
21/4/2021	(Argentina) Federico Chingotto (Argentina) Juan Tello	6–4 / 7–6	(Brazil) Lucas Bergamini (Brazil) Lucas Campagnolo	
21/4/2021	(Spain) Javier Rico (Spain) Momo González	6–4 / 7–6	(Spain) José Rico (Argentina) Ramiro Moyano	
21/4/2021	(Spain) Álvaro Cepero (Spain) Juani Mieres	2–6 / 7–5 / 6–3	(Spain) Javier Barahona (Spain) Martin Sánchez Piñeiro	
21/4/2021	(Spain) Christian Fuster (Spain) Gonzalo Rubio	7–6 / 4–6 / 6–4	(Argentina) Adrián Allemandi (Spain) Pablo Lijó	
21/4/2021	(Spain) Arturo Coello (Argentina) Miguel Lamperti	6–4 / 7–5	(Argentina) Denis Perino (Spain) Ernesto Moreno	
21/4/2021	(Spain) Francisco Gil Morales (Spain) Sergio Alba	7–6 / 6–7 / 7–5	(Argentina) Lucho Capra (Argentina) Maxi Sánchez	
21/4/2021	(Spain) Alejandro Ruiz (Argentina) Franco Stupaczuk	W.O.	(Spain) Rafael Méndez (Spain) Salvador Oria	
21/4/2021	(Argentina) Agustin Gomez Silingo (Spain) Matías Díaz	6–1 / 6–4	(Spain) Iván Ramírez (Spain) Mike Yanguas	
21/4/2021	(Argentina) Aris Patiniotis (Spain) Jon Sanz	6–4 / 0–6 / 7–6	(Spain) Javi Garrido (Argentina) Juan Cruz Belluati	

Women's
Date	Winners	Score	Opponent	Ref.
21/4/2021	(Spain) Lucía Martínez (Spain) Verónica Virseda	7–5 / 6–1	(Argentina) Nela Brito (Spain) Nicole Traviesa	
21/4/2021	(Argentina) Claudia Jensen (Spain) Sandra Bellver	7–5 / 7–6	(Spain) Alicia Blanco Rojo (Spain) Melania Merino	
21/4/2021	(Spain) Barbara Las Heras (Spain) Carla Mesa	6–3 / 6–4	(Spain) Elisabeth Amatriain (Portugal) Sofia Araújo	
21/4/2021	(Argentina) Aranzazu Osoro (Spain) Victoria Iglesias	6–4 / 6–3	(Portugal) Ana Catarina Nogueira (Spain) Teresa Navarro	
21/4/2021	(Spain) Angela Caro Cantin (Spain) Arantxa Soriano	6–4 / 6–4	(Spain) Isabel Domínguez (Spain) Lorena Alonso	
21/4/2021	(Argentina) Catalina Tenorio (Argentina) Julieta Bidahorria	6–3 / 6–1	(Spain) Carmen García Pardo (Spain) Marta Caparros	
21/4/2021	(France) Alix Collombon (Spain) Jessica Castelló	7–5 / 6–3	(Spain) Beatriz Caldera (Spain) Carmen Goenaga	
21/4/2021	(Argentina) Delfina Brea (Spain) Tamara Icardo	6–3 / 6–2	(Spain) Nuria Vivancos (Spain) Xenia Clasca	
21/4/2021	(Spain) Patricia Llaguno (Argentina) Virginia Riera	6–1 / 6–4	(Spain) Alba Galán (Spain) Maria Villalba	
21/4/2021	(Spain) Esther Carnicero (Brazil) Raquel Piltcher	6–2 / 6–4	(Spain) Carolina Navarro (Argentina) Cecilia Reiter	
21/4/2021	(Spain) Lorena Rufo (Spain) Marta Talavan	6–3 / 6–4	(Spain) Ariadna Cañellas (France) Lea Godallier	
21/4/2021	(Spain) Anna Cortiles (Spain) Ana Fernández de Ossó	6–4 / 6–1	(Spain) Araceli Martínez (Spain) Sandra Hernández	

=== Round of 16 ===
Men's
Date	Winners	Score	Opponent	Ref.
22/4/2021	(Spain) Alejandro Galán (Spain) Juan Lebrón	6–3 / 6–2	(Argentina) Agustín Gutiérrez (Spain) Javier Martinez Vázquez	
22/4/2021	(Spain) Coki Nieto (Spain) Juan Martín Díaz	2–6 / 7–6 / 6–4	(Spain) Javier Ruiz (Spain) Uri Botello	
22/4/2021	(Argentina) Federico Chingotto (Argentina) Juan Tello	2–6 / 6–1 / 6–2	(Spain) Javier Rico (Spain) Momo González	
22/4/2021	(Argentina) Martin Di Nenno (Spain) Paquito Navarro	6–1 / 6–2	(Spain) Álvaro Cepero (Spain) Juani Mieres	
22/4/2021	(Argentina) Agustín Tapia (Brazil) Pablo Lima	7–5 / 6–3	(Spain) Christian Fuster (Spain) Gonzalo Rubio	
22/4/2021	(Spain) Arturo Coello (Argentina) Miguel Lamperti	7–5 / 6–4	(Spain) Francisco Gil Morales (Spain) Sergio Alba	
22/4/2021	(Spain) Alejandro Ruiz (Argentina) Franco Stupaczuk	6–2 / 6–2	(Argentina) Agustin Gomez Silingo (Spain) Matías Díaz	
22/4/2021	(Argentina) Fernando Belasteguín (Argentina) Sanyo Gutiérrez	7–5 / 6–4	(Argentina) Aris Patiniotis (Spain) Jon Sanz	

Women's
Date	Winners	Score	Opponent	Ref.
22/4/2021	(Spain) Alejandra Salazar (Spain) Gemma Triay	6–2 / 6–1	(Spain) Lucía Martínez (Spain) Verónica Virseda	
22/4/2021	(Spain) Barbara Las Heras (Spain) Carla Mesa	6–1 / 6–3	(Argentina) Claudia Jensen (Spain) Sandra Bellver	
22/4/2021	(Argentina) Aranzazu Osoro (Spain) Victoria Iglesias	6–3 / 7–6	(Spain) Angela Caro Cantin (Spain) Arantxa Soriano	
22/4/2021	(Spain) Marta Marrero (Spain) Marta Ortega	6–4 / 6–0	(Argentina) Catalina Tenorio (Argentina) Julieta Bidahorria	
22/4/2021	(Spain) Bea González (Spain) Lucía Sainz	6–1 / 6–4	(France) Alix Collombon (Spain) Jessica Castelló	
22/4/2021	(Spain) Patricia Llaguno (Argentina) Virginia Riera	6–3 / 6–2	(Argentina) Delfina Brea (Spain) Tamara Icardo	
22/4/2021	(Spain) Lorena Rufo (Spain) Marta Talavan	6–4 / 6–4	(Spain) Esther Carnicero (Brazil) Raquel Piltcher	
22/4/2021	(Spain) Ariana Sánchez (Spain) Paula Josemaria	6–0 / 6–1	(Spain) Anna Cortiles (Spain) Ana Fernández de Ossó	

=== Quarter-Finals ===
Men's
Date	Winners	Score	Opponent	Ref.
23/4/2021	(Spain) Alejandro Galán (Spain) Juan Lebrón	6–3 / 6–0	(Spain) Coki Nieto (Spain) Juan Martín Díaz	
23/4/2021	(Argentina) Federico Chingotto (Argentina) Juan Tello	6–2 / 6–3	(Argentina) Martin Di Nenno (Spain) Paquito Navarro	
23/4/2021	(Spain) Arturo Coello (Argentina) Miguel Lamperti	6–7 / 7–5 / 6–4	(Argentina) Agustín Tapia (Brazil) Pablo Lima	
23/4/2021	(Spain) Alejandro Ruiz (Argentina) Franco Stupaczuk	7–6 / 7–5	(Argentina) Fernando Belasteguín (Argentina) Sanyo Gutiérrez	

Women's
Date	Winners	Score	Opponent	Ref.
23/4/2021	(Spain) Alejandra Salazar (Spain) Gemma Triay	6–0 / 6–2	(Spain) Barbara Las Heras (Spain) Carla Mesa	
23/4/2021	(Argentina) Aranzazu Osoro (Spain) Victoria Iglesias	6–4 / 6–4	(Spain) Marta Marrero (Spain) Marta Ortega	
23/4/2021	(Spain) Bea González (Spain) Lucía Sainz	7–6 / 1–2 / W.O.	(Spain) Patricia Llaguno (Argentina) Virginia Riera	
23/4/2021	(Spain) Ariana Sánchez (Spain) Paula Josemaria	6–4 / 6–4	(Spain) Lorena Rufo (Spain) Marta Talavan	

=== Semi-Finals ===
Men's
Date	Winners	Score	Opponent	Ref.
24/4/2021	(Spain) Alejandro Galán (Spain) Juan Lebrón	6–2 / 6–2	(Argentina) Federico Chingotto (Argentina) Juan Tello	
24/4/2021	(Spain) Alejandro Ruiz (Argentina) Franco Stupaczuk	6–0 / 7–5	(Spain) Arturo Coello (Argentina) Miguel Lamperti	

Women's
Date	Winners	Score	Opponent	Ref.
24/4/2021	(Spain) Alejandra Salazar (Spain) Gemma Triay	6–3 / 6–3	(Argentina) Aranzazu Osoro (Spain) Victoria Iglesias	
24/4/2021	(Spain) Ariana Sánchez (Spain) Paula Josemaria	6–3 / 7–6	(Spain) Bea González (Spain) Lucía Sainz	

=== Finals ===
Men's
Date	Winners	Score	Opponent	Ref.
25/4/2021	(Spain) Alejandro Galán (Spain) Juan Lebrón	6–0 / 6–4	(Spain) Alejandro Ruiz (Argentina) Franco Stupaczuk	

Women's
Date	Winners	Score	Opponent	Ref.
25/4/2021	(Spain) Alejandra Salazar (Spain) Gemma Triay	6–0 / 6–1	(Spain) Ariana Sánchez (Spain) Paula Josemaria	
