= 2020 WPT Alicante Open =

World Padel Tour tournament held in Alicante, Spain

- Date: 4 – 8 November
- Edition: 13th (Note: The first seven editions were held under the organization of the Padel Pro Tour.)
- Category: Open
- Location: Alicante, Spain
- Venue: Pabellón Pedro Ferrándiz

Champions
- Men's doubles: (Spain) Alejandro Galán (Spain) Juan Lebrón
- Women's doubles: (Spain) Gemma Triay (Spain) Lucía Sainz

Chronology

The 2020 WPT Alicante Open (officially 2020 World Padel Tour Estrella Damm Alicante Open) was the ninth tournament of the eight season organized by World Padel Tour, the most prestigious padel circuit at the time.

In the women's category, the number two and number three ranked pairs reached the final. The first finalists were the third-ranked pair, Gemma Triay and Lucia Sainz, who defeated Elisabeth Amatriain and Patricia Llaguno in the semi-final to reach their third consecutive final. Their opponents were the second-ranked pair, Marta Marrero and Marta Ortega, who eliminated the fourth-ranked pair, the twins Majo and Mapi Sánchez, to reach the final in their first tournament back together. In the final, Gemma and Lucia defeated the 'Martas' in three sets, winning their third title of the season and their first in Alicante. With the victory, Gemma and Lucia also surpassed Ariana Sánchez and Alejandra Salazar in finals, having five finals and three titles (1 Master and 2 Open's) against four finals and three titles (3 Open's) of their rivals.

In the men's category, the number one and number four FIP ranked pairs reached the finals, repeating their previous tournament final match. The first finalists were the world number ones, Alejandro Galán and Juan Lebrón, who defeated Martín Di Nenno and Maxi Sánchez in the semi-final. Their opponents were the number four ranked pair, Franco Stupaczuk and Sanyo Gutiérrez, who, for the third consecutive tournament, defeated the world number two, Pablo Lima and Paquito Navarro, to reach the final. In the championship match, Galán and Lebrón defeated Sanyo and Stupaczuk in three sets, winning their sixth title of the season, with Lebrón successfully defending the title he won last season and Galán winning his first in Alicante. Even with the defeat, by reaching the final Sanyo and Stupaczuk moved up to the second ranked pair in the Race Ranking.

== Relevant Data ==
=== The Martas return to competing together ===
Marta Marrero and Marta Ortega, who played together for only one season in 2019, during which they dominated the circuit, reunited as a pair for the remainder of 2020. Meanwhile, Bea González, who partnered with Ortega, joined forces with Marrero's former partner, Paula Josemaria.

=== Belasteguín and Tello miss the Alicante Open ===
Fernando Belasteguín and Juan Tello were unable to participate in the Alicante Open due to medical leave after contracting coronavirus. Therefore, third ranked pair, Agustín Tapia and Belasteguín, and the fifth ranked pair, Federico Chingotto and Tello, did not participate in the tournament.

== Head-to-head record between teams ranked in the top 4 during the season ==
=== Men's ===
Record	Galán–Lebrón	Lima–Paquito	Belasteguín–Tapia	Sanyo–Stupaczuk	Former Pairs	Díaz–Maxi
Galán–Lebrón	—	1–1	2–1	6–0		1–0
Lima–Paquito	1–1	—	0–1	0–3		1–0
Belasteguín–Tapia	1–2	1–0	—	0–3		0–1
Sanyo–Stupaczuk	0–6	3–0	3–0	—		1–0
Former Pairs
Díaz–Maxi	0–1	0–1	1–0	0–1		—

=== Women's ===
Record	Ariana–Salazar	Marrero–Ortega	Gemma–Lucia	Majo–Mapi	Former Pairs	Delfina–Nogueira	Josemaria–Marrero	Bea–Ortega
Ariana–Salazar	—	—	2–2	2–0		1–0	1–1	1–1
Marrero–Ortega	—	—	0–1	1–0		—	—	—
Gemma–Lucia	2–2	1–0	—	1–1		1–0	2–2	2–0
Majo–Mapi	0–2	0–1	1–1	—		1–0	2–2	1–2
Former Pairs
Delfina–Nogueira	0–1	—	0–1	0–1		—	—	0–1
Josemaria–Marrero	1–1	—	2–2	2–2		—	—	1–0
Bea–Ortega	1–1	—	0–2	2–1		1–0	0–1	—

== Draws ==
=== Men's Bracket ===
Round of 32
1	(Spain) Galán / (Spain) Lebrón
Bye
(Spain) C. Fuster / (Spain) G. Rubio	6	6
(Spain) J.G. Diestro / (Spain) P. Fernández	3	3
(Argentina) C. Gutiérrez / (Argentina) M. Grabiel	4	2
(Spain) Á. Cepero / (Spain) J. Mieres	6	6
(Argentina) A. Gutiérrez / (Argentina) J.C. Belluati
7	(Argentina) A. Allemandi / (Spain) Momo
5	(Spain) J. Ruiz / (Spain) U. Botello	6	5	*
(Argentina) L. Capra / (Argentina) R. Moyano	2	1
(Argentina) D. Perino / (Spain) J. Gutiérrez	3	1
(Argentina) A. Patiniotis / (Spain) M. Yanguas	6	6
(Spain) J. Garrido / (Spain) J. Martinez	2	6	7
(Brazil) F. Gomes / (Argentina) Godo Díaz	6	3	6
Bye
4	(Argentina) Di Nenno / (Argentina) Maxi
3	(Argentina) Sanyo / (Argentina) Stupaczuk
Bye
(Brazil) L. Bergamini / (Argentina) M. Lamperti	1	4
(Spain) F. Gil Morales / (Spain) S. Alba	6	6
(Spain) M. Piñeiro / (Spain) N. Gadea	6	3	3
(Spain) J. Menendez / (Spain) J. Marmolejo	4	6	6
(Spain) Coello / (Spain) I. Ramírez	5	1
8	(Spain) Coki / (Spain) J. Rico	7	6
6	(Argentina) A. Silingo / (Spain) M. Díaz	6	6
(Spain) J.M. Díaz / (Brazil) L. Campagnolo	4	4
(Spain) A. Sans / (Spain) I. Zaratiegui	3	0
(Spain) A. Ruiz / (Spain) P. Lijó	6	6
(Spain) R. Rivera / (Spain) T. Bueno	6	4
(Spain) E. Moreno / (Spain) J. Rico	7	6
Bye
2	(Brazil) P. Lima / (Spain) Paquito

Round of 16
1	(Spain) Galán / (Spain) Lebrón	6	3	7
(Spain) C. Fuster / (Spain) G. Rubio	3	6	6
(Spain) Á. Cepero / (Spain) J. Mieres	0	7	6
7	(Argentina) A. Allemandi / (Spain) Momo	6	5	7
5	(Spain) J. Ruiz / (Spain) U. Botello	6	6
(Argentina) A. Patiniotis / (Spain) M. Yanguas	3	3
(Spain) J. Garrido / (Spain) J. Martinez	2	1
4	(Argentina) Di Nenno / (Argentina) Maxi	6	6
3	(Argentina) Sanyo / (Argentina) Stupaczuk	5	6	6
(Spain) F. Gil Morales / (Spain) S. Alba	7	1	1
(Spain) J. Menendez / (Spain) J. Marmolejo	0	1
8	(Spain) Coki / (Spain) J. Rico	6	6
6	(Argentina) A. Silingo / (Spain) M. Díaz	4	2
(Spain) A. Ruiz / (Spain) P. Lijó	6	6
(Spain) E. Moreno / (Spain) J. Rico	1	2
2	(Brazil) P. Lima / (Spain) Paquito

Quarter-Final
1	(Spain) Galán / (Spain) Lebrón	6	6
7	(Argentina) A. Allemandi / (Spain) Momo	1	1
5	(Spain) J. Ruiz / (Spain) U. Botello	5	4
4	(Argentina) Di Nenno / (Argentina) Maxi	7	6
3	(Argentina) Sanyo / (Argentina) Stupaczuk	6	6
8	(Spain) Coki / (Spain) J. Rico	1	2
(Spain) A. Ruiz / (Spain) P. Lijó	4	3
2	(Brazil) P. Lima / (Spain) Paquito	6	6

Semi-Finals
1	(Spain) Galán / (Spain) Lebrón	4	6	6
4	(Argentina) Di Nenno / (Argentina) Maxi	6	3	1
3	(Argentina) Sanyo / (Argentina) Stupaczuk	5	6	6
2	(Brazil) P. Lima / (Spain) Paquito	7	3	2

Finals
1	(Spain) Galán / (Spain) Lebrón	4	6	6
3	(Argentina) Sanyo / (Argentina) Stupaczuk	6	3	4

=== Women's Bracket ===
Round of 32
1	(Spain) Ariana / (Spain) Salazar
Bye
(Spain) B. Las Heras / (Spain) C. Mesa	6	4	*
(Spain) A.F. de Ossó / (Spain) L. Martínez	1	1
(Spain) B. Caldera / (Spain) C. Goenaga	3	6	6
(Spain) S. Hernández / (Spain) T. Icardo	6	2	4
(France) L. Clergue / (France) L. Godallier	2	1
6	(Spain) E. Amatriain / (Spain) P. Llaguno	6	6
8	(Argentina) A. Osoro / (Spain) C. Navarro	6	6	6
(Spain) E. Carnicero / (Spain) T. Navarro	7	2	1
(Argentina) N. Brito / (Spain) N. Traviesa	5	6
(Spain) L. Alonso / (Brazil) R. Piltcher	7	7
(Portugal) S. Araújo / (Argentina) V. Riera	4	7	6
(Spain) M. Villalba / (Spain) V. Virseda	6	6	3
Bye
3	(Spain) Gemma / (Spain) L. Sainz
4	(Spain) Majo / (Spain) Mapi
Bye
(Argentina) C. Jensen / (Spain) M. Gómez	6	4	5
(Spain) C. García / (Spain) M. Caparros	3	6	7
(Spain) A. Soriano / (Spain) P. Martínez	2	6	2
(Spain) A. Tapia / (Spain) J. Castelló	6	4	6
(France) A. Collombon / (Spain) S. Ruiz	2	2
5	(Spain) Bea González / (Spain) P. Josemaria	6	6
7	(Portugal) A.C. Nogueira / (Argentina) D. Brea	4	7	6
(Spain) L. Rufo / (Spain) M. Talavan	6	6	3
(Spain) A. Galán / (Spain) V. Iglesias	6	6
(Spain) A. Cantin / (Spain) N. Rodríguez	4	1
(Argentina) C. Tenorio / (Argentina) J. Bidahorria	7	6
(Argentina) C. Paz / (Spain) I. Dominguez	5	0
Bye
2	(Spain) M. Marrero / (Spain) M. Ortega

Round of 16
1	(Spain) Ariana / (Spain) Salazar	6	7
(Spain) B. Las Heras / (Spain) C. Mesa	3	5
(Spain) B. Caldera / (Spain) C. Goenaga	3	1
6	(Spain) E. Amatriain / (Spain) P. Llaguno	6	6
8	(Argentina) A. Osoro / (Spain) C. Navarro	6	6
(Spain) L. Alonso / (Brazil) R. Piltcher	3	0
(Portugal) S. Araújo / (Argentina) V. Riera	3	1
3	(Spain) Gemma / (Spain) L. Sainz	6	6
4	(Spain) Majo / (Spain) Mapi	6	6
(Spain) C. García / (Spain) M. Caparros	2	3
(Spain) A. Tapia / (Spain) J. Castelló	1	1
5	(Spain) Bea González / (Spain) P. Josemaria	6	6
7	(Portugal) A.C. Nogueira / (Argentina) D. Brea	6	4	3
(Spain) A. Galán / (Spain) V. Iglesias	4	6	6
(Argentina) C. Tenorio / (Argentina) J. Bidahorria	1	0
2	(Spain) M. Marrero / (Spain) M. Ortega	6	6

Quarter-Final
1	(Spain) Ariana / (Spain) Salazar	5	3
6	(Spain) E. Amatriain / (Spain) P. Llaguno	7	6
8	(Argentina) A. Osoro / (Spain) C. Navarro	3	5
3	(Spain) Gemma / (Spain) L. Sainz	6	7
4	(Spain) Majo / (Spain) Mapi	*
5	(Spain) Bea González / (Spain) P. Josemaria
(Spain) A. Galán / (Spain) V. Iglesias	3	0
2	(Spain) M. Marrero / (Spain) M. Ortega	6	1	*

Semi-Finals
6	(Spain) E. Amatriain / (Spain) P. Llaguno	0	3
3	(Spain) Gemma / (Spain) L. Sainz	6	6
4	(Spain) Majo / (Spain) Mapi	2	6	3
2	(Spain) M. Marrero / (Spain) M. Ortega	6	4	6

Finals
3	(Spain) Gemma / (Spain) L. Sainz	2	7	6
2	(Spain) M. Marrero / (Spain) M. Ortega	6	6	3

== Results ==
=== Round of 32 ===
Men's
Date	Winners	Score	Opponent	Ref.
4/11/2020	(Spain) Christian Fuster (Spain) Gonzalo Rubio	6–3 / 6–3	(Spain) José García Diestro (Spain) Pincho Fernández	
4/11/2020	(Spain) Álvaro Cepero (Spain) Juani Mieres	6–4 / 6–2	(Argentina) Cristian Gutiérrez (Argentina) Maxi Grabiel	
4/11/2020	(Argentina) Adrián Allemandi (Spain) Momo González	7–6 / 5–7 / 6–4	(Argentina) Agustin Gutiérrez (Argentina) Juan Cruz Belluati	
4/11/2020	(Spain) Javi Ruiz (Spain) Uri Botello	6–2 / 5–1 / W.O.	(Argentina) Luciano Capra (Argentina) Ramiro Moyano	
4/11/2020	(Argentina) Aris Patiniotis (Spain) Mike Yanguas	6–3 / 6–1	(Argentina) Denis Perino (Spain) Jorge Ruiz Gutiérrez	
4/11/2020	(Spain) Javi Garrido (Spain) Javier Martinez Vazquez	2–6 / 6–3 / 7–6	(Brazil) Francisco Gomes (Argentina) Godo Díaz	
4/11/2020	(Spain) Francisco Gil Morales (Spain) Sergio Alba	6–1 / 6–4	(Brazil) Lucas Bergamini (Argentina) Miguel Lamperti	
4/11/2020	(Spain) Jaime Menendez Gil (Spain) Jose Solano Marmolejo	4–6 / 6–3 / 6–3	(Spain) Martin Sánchez Piñeiro (Spain) Nacho Gadea	
4/11/2020	(Spain) Coki Nieto (Spain) Javi Rico	7–5 / 6–1	(Spain) Arturo Coello (Spain) Iván Ramírez	
4/11/2020	(Argentina) Agustin Gómez Silingo (Spain) Matías Díaz	6–4 / 6–4	(Spain) Juan Martín Díaz (Brazil) Lucas Campagnolo	
4/11/2020	(Spain) Alejandro Ruiz (Spain) Pablo Lijó	6–3 / 6–0	(Spain) Anton Sans (Spain) Iñigo Zaratiegui	
4/11/2020	(Spain) Ernesto Moreno (Spain) José Rico	7–6 / 6–4	(Spain) Rubén Rivera (Spain) Toni Bueno	

Women's
Date	Winners	Score	Opponent	Ref.
4/11/2020	(Spain) Barbara Las Heras (Spain) Carla Mesa	6–1 / 4–1 / W.O.	(Spain) Ana Fernández de Ossó (Spain) Lucía Martínez	
4/11/2020	(Spain) Beatriz Caldera (Spain) Carmen Goenaga	3–6 / 6–2 / 6–4	(Spain) Sandra Hernández (Spain) Tamara Icardo	
4/11/2020	(Spain) Elisabeth Amatriain (Spain) Patricia Llaguno	6–2 / 6–1	(France) Laura Clergue (France) Léa Godallier	
4/11/2020	(Argentina) Aranzazu Osoro (Spain) Carolina Navarro	6–7 / 6–2 / 6–1	(Spain) Esther Carnicero (Spain) Teresa Navarro	
4/11/2020	(Spain) Lorena Alonso (Brazil) Raquel Piltcher	7–5 / 7–6	(Spain) Araceli Martinez (Argentina) Nela Brito	
4/11/2020	(Portugal) Sofia Araújo (Argentina) Virginia Riera	4–6 / 7–6 / 6–3	(Spain) Maria Villalba (Spain) Verónica Virseda	
4/11/2020	(Spain) Alicia Blanco Rojo (Spain) Melania Merino	6–4 / 6–3	(Spain) Carmen García Pardo (Spain) Marta Caparros	
4/11/2020	(Spain) Anna Cortiles Tapia (Spain) Jessica Castelló	6–2 / 4–6 / 6–2	(Spain) Arantxa Soriano (Spain) Patricia Martínez	
4/11/2020	(Spain) Bea González (Spain) Paula Josemaria	6–2 / 6–2	(France) Alix Collombon (Spain) Sara Ruiz	
4/11/2020	(Portugal) Ana Catarina Nogueira (Argentina) Delfina Brea	4–6 / 7–6 / 6–3	(Spain) Lorena Rufo (Spain) Marta Talavan	
4/11/2020	(Spain) Alba Galán (Spain) Victoria Iglesias	6–4 / 6–1	(Spain) Angela Caro Cantin (Spain) Nuria Rodríguez	
4/11/2020	(Argentina) Catalina Tenorio (Argentina) Julieta Bidahorria	7–5 / 6–0	(Argentina) Celeste Paz (Spain) Isabel Dominguez	

=== Round of 16 ===
Men's
Date	Winners	Score	Opponent	Ref.
5/11/2020	(Spain) Alejandro Galán (Spain) Juan Lebrón	6–3 / 3–6 / 7–6	(Spain) Christian Fuster (Spain) Gonzalo Rubio	
5/11/2020	(Argentina) Adrián Allemandi (Spain) Momo González	6–0 / 5–7 / 7–6	(Spain) Álvaro Cepero (Spain) Juani Mieres	
5/11/2020	(Spain) Javi Ruiz (Spain) Uri Botello	6–3 / 6–3	(Argentina) Aris Patiniotis (Spain) Mike Yanguas	
5/11/2020	(Argentina) Martín Di Nenno (Argentina) Maxi Sánchez	6–2 / 6–1	(Spain) Javi Garrido (Spain) Javier Martinez Vazquez	
5/11/2020	(Argentina) Franco Stupaczuk (Argentina) Sanyo Gutiérrez	5–7 / 6–1 / 6–1	(Spain) Francisco Gil Morales (Spain) Sergio Alba	
5/11/2020	(Spain) Coki Nieto (Spain) Javi Rico	6–0 / 6–1	(Spain) Jaime Menendez Gil (Spain) Jose Solano Marmolejo	
5/11/2020	(Spain) Alejandro Ruiz (Spain) Pablo Lijó	6–4 / 6–2	(Argentina) Agustin Gómez Silingo (Spain) Matías Díaz	
5/11/2020	(Brazil) Pablo Lima (Spain) Paquito Navarro	6–1 / 6–2	(Spain) Ernesto Moreno (Spain) José Rico	

Women's
Date	Winners	Score	Opponent	Ref.
5/11/2020	(Spain) Alejandra Salazar (Spain) Ariana Sánchez	6–3 / 7–5	(Spain) Barbara Las Heras (Spain) Carla Mesa	
5/11/2020	(Spain) Elisabeth Amatriain (Spain) Patricia Llaguno	6–3 / 6–1	(Spain) Beatriz Caldera (Spain) Carmen Goenaga	
5/11/2020	(Argentina) Aranzazu Osoro (Spain) Carolina Navarro	6–3 / 6–0	(Spain) Lorena Alonso (Brazil) Raquel Piltcher	
5/11/2020	(Spain) Gemma Triay (Spain) Lucia Sainz	6–3 / 6–1	(Portugal) Sofia Araújo (Argentina) Virginia Riera	
5/11/2020	(Spain) Majo Sánchez (Spain) Mapi Sánchez	6–2 / 6–3	(Spain) Alicia Blanco Rojo (Spain) Melania Merino	
5/11/2020	(Spain) Bea González (Spain) Paula Josemaria	6–1 / 6–1	(Spain) Anna Cortiles Tapia (Spain) Jessica Castelló	
5/11/2020	(Spain) Alba Galán (Spain) Victoria Iglesias	4–6 / 6–4 / 6–3	(Portugal) Ana Catarina Nogueira (Argentina) Delfina Brea	
5/11/2020	(Spain) Marta Marrero (Spain) Marta Ortega	6–1 / 6–0	(Argentina) Catalina Tenorio (Argentina) Julieta Bidahorria	

=== Quarter-Finals ===
Men's
Date	Winners	Score	Opponent	Ref.
6/11/2020	(Spain) Alejandro Galán (Spain) Juan Lebrón	6–1 / 6–1	(Argentina) Adrián Allemandi (Spain) Momo González	
6/11/2020	(Argentina) Martín Di Nenno (Argentina) Maxi Sánchez	7–5 / 6–4	(Spain) Javi Ruiz (Spain) Uri Botello	
6/11/2020	(Argentina) Franco Stupaczuk (Argentina) Sanyo Gutiérrez	6–1 / 6–2	(Spain) Coki Nieto (Spain) Javi Rico	
6/11/2020	(Brazil) Pablo Lima (Spain) Paquito Navarro	6–4 / 6–3	(Spain) Alejandro Ruiz (Spain) Pablo Lijó	

Women's
Date	Winners	Score	Opponent	Ref.
6/11/2020	(Spain) Elisabeth Amatriain (Spain) Patricia Llaguno	7–5 / 6–3	(Spain) Alejandra Salazar (Spain) Ariana Sánchez	
6/11/2020	(Spain) Gemma Triay (Spain) Lucia Sainz	6–3 / 7–5	(Argentina) Aranzazu Osoro (Spain) Carolina Navarro	
6/11/2020	(Spain) Majo Sánchez (Spain) Mapi Sánchez	W.O.	(Spain) Bea González (Spain) Paula Josemaria	
6/11/2020	(Spain) Marta Marrero (Spain) Marta Ortega	6–3 / 1–0 / W.O.	(Spain) Alba Galán (Spain) Victoria Iglesias	

=== Semi-Finals ===
Men's
Date	Winners	Score	Opponent	Ref.
7/11/2020	(Spain) Alejandro Galán (Spain) Juan Lebrón	4–6 / 6–3 / 6–1	(Argentina) Martín Di Nenno (Argentina) Maxi Sánchez	
7/11/2020	(Argentina) Franco Stupaczuk (Argentina) Sanyo Gutiérrez	5–7 / 6–3 / 6–2	(Brazil) Pablo Lima (Spain) Paquito Navarro	

Women's
Date	Winners	Score	Opponent	Ref.
7/11/2020	(Spain) Gemma Triay (Spain) Lucia Sainz	6–0 / 6–3	(Spain) Elisabeth Amatriain (Spain) Patricia Llaguno	
7/11/2020	(Spain) Marta Marrero (Spain) Marta Ortega	6–2 / 4–6 / 6–3	(Spain) Majo Sánchez (Spain) Mapi Sánchez	

=== Finals ===
Men's
Date	Winners	Score	Opponent	Ref.
8/11/2020	(Spain) Alejandro Galán (Spain) Juan Lebrón	4–6 / 6–3 / 6–4	(Argentina) Franco Stupaczuk (Argentina) Sanyo Gutiérrez	

Women's
Date	Winners	Score	Opponent	Ref.
8/11/2020	(Spain) Gemma Triay (Spain) Lucia Sainz	2–6 / 7–6 / 6–3	(Spain) Marta Marrero (Spain) Marta Ortega	
