= Juampi Sutina =

Argentine-Spanish basketball player

No. 12 – CD Estela
- Position: Shooting guard
- League: LEB Plata

Personal information
- Born: February 9, 1990 (age 36) Buenos Aires, Argentina
- Listed height: 1.92 m (6 ft 4 in)

Career information
- Playing career: 2008–present

Career history
- 2008–2009: CB Monzón
- 2009–2010: Lleida Bàsquet
- 2010–2011: CB Monzón
- 2011: AD Torreforta
- 2011–2012: Ferrol CB
- 2012–2018: Força Lleida
- 2018–present: CD Estela

Juan Pablo Sutina Bustamante (born February 2, 1990) is an Argentine-Spanish basketball player, who plays the shooting guard position for the Spanish club CD Estela.
