= José Simeón =

Spanish basketball player

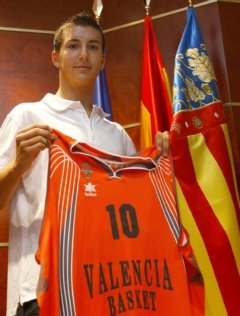
- Simeón, with Valencia in 2009

Hispagan UPB Gandia
- Position: Point guard
- League: LEB Oro

Personal information
- Born: March 19, 1991 (age 34); Silla, Valencia, Spain
- Listed height: 1.86 m (6 ft 1 in)

Career history
- 2009–2011: Pamesa Valencia
- 2011–2012: Lleida Basquetbol
- 2012–2016: Força Lleida
- 2016–2017: Marín Peixefresco
- 2017: Força Lleida
- 2017–: Hispagan UPB Gandia
Medals
Men's basketball
FIBA Europe Under-20 Championship
Gold medal – first place	2011 Spain	Team
Bronze medal – third place	2010 Croatia	Team

José Simeón Luján (born March 19, 1991) is a Spanish basketball player, who plays the point guard position. He's currently playing for the Spanish club Hispagan UPB Gandia. He played Valencia BC youth system between 2002 and 2009.

== Awards and accomplishments ==
=== Club honours ===
- Eurocup (1):
  - 2009–10
- LEB Catalan League (2):
  - 2011, 2012

=== Spanish national team ===
- 2010 FIBA Europe Under-20 Championship: Bronze
- 2011 FIBA Europe Under-20 Championship: Gold
