= Álex Llorca =

Spanish basketball player

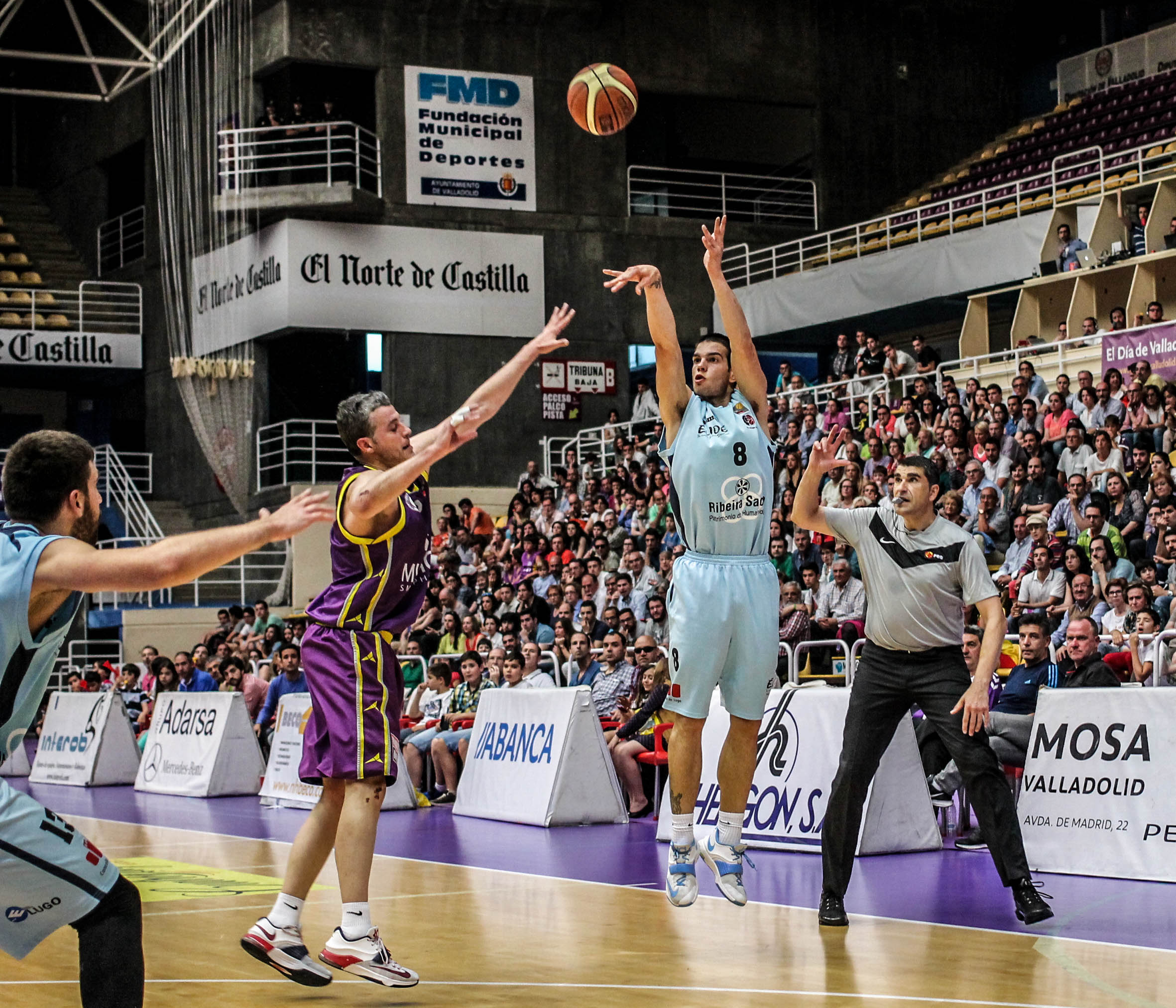
- Llorca, with CB Breogán in 2015

Club Melilla Baloncesto
- Position: Shooting guard
- League: LEB Oro

Personal information
- Born: January 26, 1989 (age 37) Esplugues de Llobregat, Spain
- Listed height: 1.92 m (6 ft 4 in)

Career information
- Playing career: 2007–present

Career history
- 2007–2008: CB L'Hospitalet
- 2008–2009: CB Vic
- 2009–2011: Bàsquet Manresa
- 2011–2012: CB Tarragona
- 2012–2013: Lucentum Alicante
- 2013–2014: Força Lleida
- 2014–2015: Breogán
- 2015–2019: Fuenlabrada
- 2019–2020: Coruña
- 2020–2021: Girona
- 2021–present: Club Melilla Baloncesto
Medals
Men's 3x3 Basketball
Representing Spain
European Games
Silver medal – second place	Baku 2015	National Team

Alejandro Llorca Castillo (born January 26, 1989) is a Spanish basketball player, who plays for Club Melilla Baloncesto of the LEB Oro. He is a shooting guard

He signed with Fuenlabrada in September 2015. Llorca spent the 2020–21 season with Girona, averaging 9.2 points and 2.8 rebounds per game. On October 1, 2021, he signed with Club Melilla Baloncesto.

== National team ==
Llorca has played with National 3x3 team, winning the silver medal at the 2015 European Games.
