= Carlos Cazorla =

Spanish basketball player

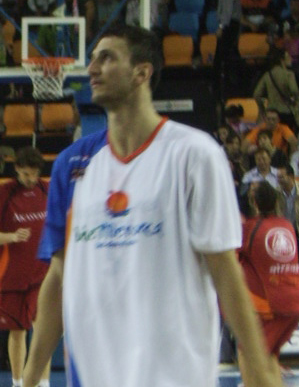

Personal information
- Born: 7 December 1977 (age 48) Las Palmas de Gran Canaria
- Listed height: 6 ft 5.5 in (1.97 m)
- Listed weight: 210 lb (95 kg)

Career information
- Playing career: 1993–2011
- Position: Small forward

Carlos Cazorla Medina (born 7 December 1977) is a retired Spanish basketball small forward. His elder brother Juan Pedro and younger sister Maite Cazorla are also professional basketball players.

== Clubs ==
- Saski Baskonia – ACB (Spain) – 1993–1998
- Baloncesto Fuenlabrada – ACB (Spain) – 1998–2002
- Caja San Fernando – ACB (Spain) – 2002–2007
- ViveMenorca – ACB (Spain) – 2007–2008
- CB Lucentum Alicante – LEB Oro (Spain) – 2008–2009
- Meridiano Alicante – ACB (Spain) – 2009–2011
