= Sandi Čebular =

Slovenian basketball player

Terme Olimia Podčetrtek
- Position: Shooting guard
- League: Liga Nova KBM

Personal information
- Born: 24 June 1986 (age 40) Celje, SR Slovenia, SFR Yugoslavia
- Listed height: 1.96 m (6 ft 5 in)

Career information
- Playing career: 2002–2024

Career history
- 2002–2006: Šentjur
- 2006–2007: Union Olimpija
- 2007–2009: Rosalía de Castro
- 2009–2010: Šentjur
- 2010–2011: Geoplin Slovan
- 2011–2012: Helios Domžale
- 2012–2013: Peñas Huesca
- 2013–2015: Rogaška
- 2015–2016: Tajfun Šentjur
- 2016–2017: Krka
- 2017: Šentjur
- 2017–2018: Mahram Tehran
- 2018: CB Breogán
- 2018–2020: Hopsi Polzela
- 2020–2023: Terme Olimia Podčetrtek
- 2023–2024: Rogaška

Career highlights
- Slovenian Supercup (2016); Slovenian Supercup MVP (2016)

Sandi Čebular (born 24 June 1986) is a Slovenian professional basketball player who last played for Rogaška. He is 6 ft 5 in (1.96 m) tall.

== Professional career ==
He played for KK Šentjur (Slo), Union Olimpija (Slo), CB Rosalía de Castro (Spa), Geoplin Slovan (Slo), KK Helios (Slo) and Peñas Huesca (Spa) before he signed with KK Rogaška.

On 28 February 2018 Cebular signed with Spanish second division team CB Breogán until end of season 2017–18.

== Slovenian national team ==
Čebular competed for the senior Slovenian national basketball team at the 2007 FIBA European Championship.
