= Salva Arco =

Spanish basketball player

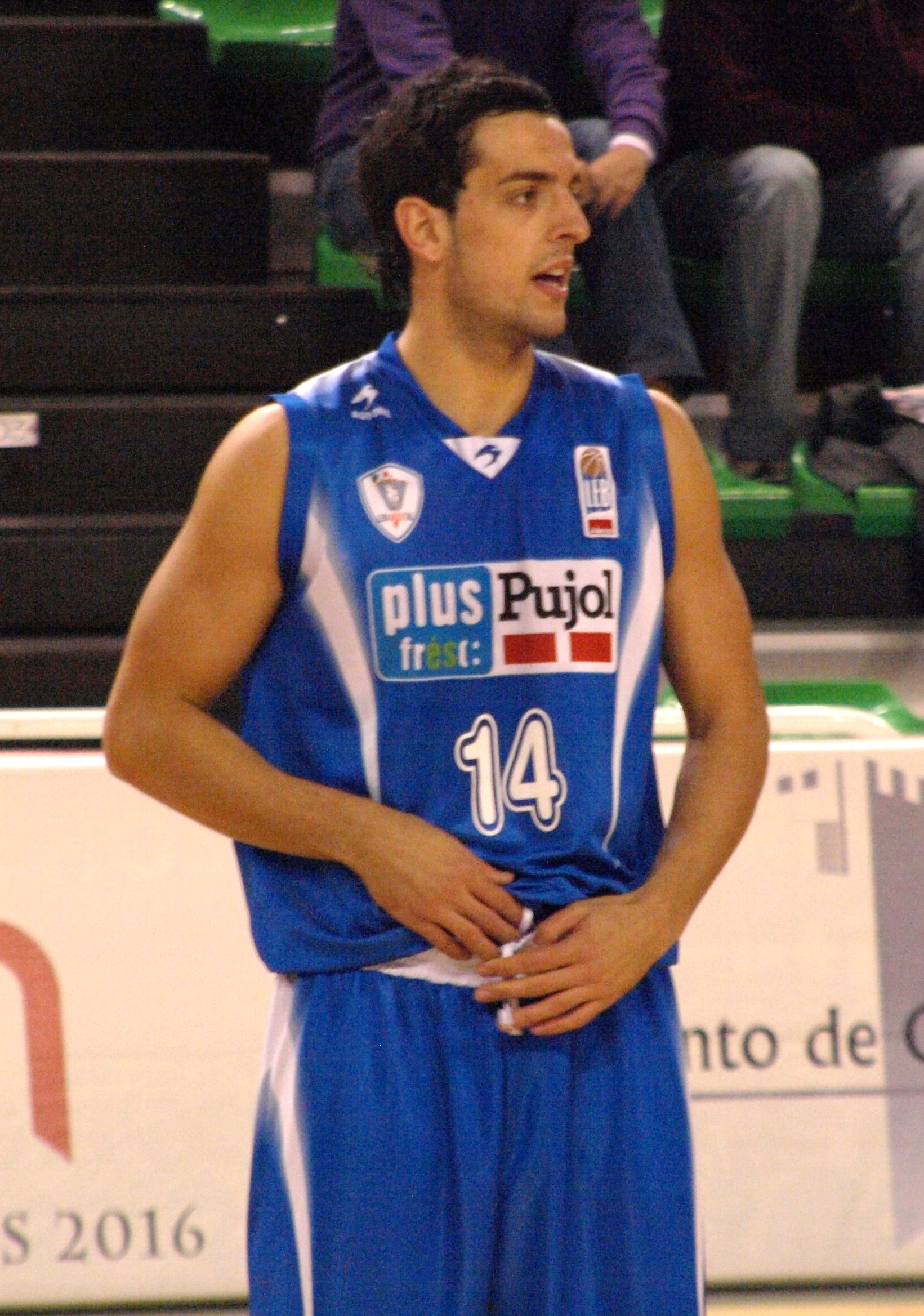

No. 14 – Cafés Candelas Breogán
- Position: Small forward

Personal information
- Born: October 25, 1984 (age 41) Navàs, Spain
- Listed height: 6 ft 5 in (1.96 m)
- Listed weight: 198 lb (90 kg)

Career information
- Playing career: 2001–present

Career history
- 2001–2002: CB Navàs
- 2002–2003: CB Monzón
- 2003–2006: Caprabo Lleida
- 2004–2005: →Club Melilla Baloncesto
- 2005–2006: →CB Vic
- 2006–2007: CB L'Hospitalet
- 2007–2008: Bruesa GBC
- 2008–2009: Plus Pujol Lleida
- 2009–2011: Aguas de Sousas Ourense
- 2011–2012: Club Melilla Baloncesto
- 2012–2014: Manresa
- 2014–2015: Club Ourense Baloncesto
- 2015: Ulm
- 2015–2016: Canarias
- 2016–present: Cafés Candelas Breogán

José Salvador Arco Frías (born October 25, 1984, in Navàs) is a Spanish professional basketball player. He currently plays for Cafés Candelas Breogán of the Spanish LEB Oro.

== Honours ==
Plus Pujol Lleida

- LEB Catalan League Champion: 1
  - 2008

Club Baloncesto Breogán

- LEB Oro Champion: 1
  - 2018
- Copa Princesa Champion: 1
  - 2018
