= Osvaldas Matulionis =

Lithuanian basketball player

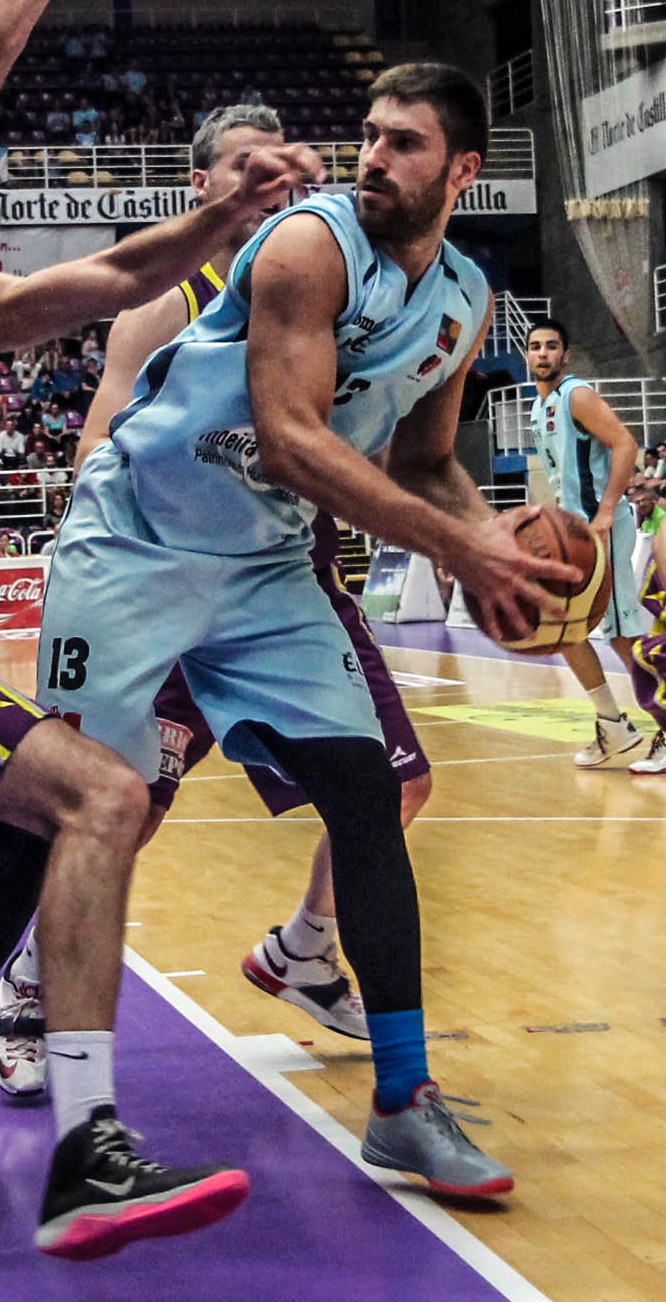
- Matulionis with Breogán in 2016

No. 13 – Fibwi Palma
- Position: Small forward
- League: Primera FEB

Personal information
- Born: August 19, 1991 (age 35) Šiauliai, Lithuania
- Listed height: 2.00 m (6 ft 7 in)
- Listed weight: 100 kg (220 lb)

Career information
- Playing career: 2009–present

Career history
- 2009–2010: Aisčiai Kaunas
- 2010–2011: Šiauliai
- 2011–2012: Techasas Panevėžys
- 2012–2013: Pärnu
- 2013–2014: Força Lleida
- 2014–2016: Breogán
- 2016–2017: Obradoiro
- 2017: Brussels
- 2017–2018: Bauru
- 2018–2019: Bilbao
- 2019–2020: Melilla
- 2020–2021: Coruña
- 2021–2023: Alicante
- 2023–2024: Força Lleida
- 2024–2025: Fuenlabrada
- 2025–present: Fibwi Palma
Medals
Men's basketball
Representing Lithuania
FIBA Europe Under-16 Championship
Bronze medal – third place	2007 Greece	National Team

Osvaldas Matulionis (born August 19, 1991) is a Lithuanian professional basketball player for Fibwi Palma of the Primera FEB. He plays in the small forward position. He played for the Lietuvos rytas Vilnius youth system between 2007 and 2009.

== Professional career ==
In 2013, Matulionis arrived in Spain to play at Força Lleida of the Spanish second division. Two years later, he agreed to terms with Cafés Candelas Breogán for one season.

On September 20, 2016, Matulionis signed a one-month contract with Río Natura Monbús Obradoiro for making his debut at Liga ACB.

On November 13, 2017, Matulionis was introduced at the Brazilian's champion Bauru Basket from NBB.

On July 19, 2018, Matulionis signed with RETAbet Bilbao Basket of the LEB Oro.

On July 4, 2024, he signed with Fuenlabrada of the Primera FEB.

== Awards and accomplishments ==
=== Club honours ===
- Baltic Challenge Cup (1):
  - 2012

=== Lithuanian national team ===
- 2007 FIBA Europe Under-16 Championship: Bronze
