= Pazo dos Deportes Paco Paz =

Sport complex located on Ourense, Spain

Pazo Paco Paz
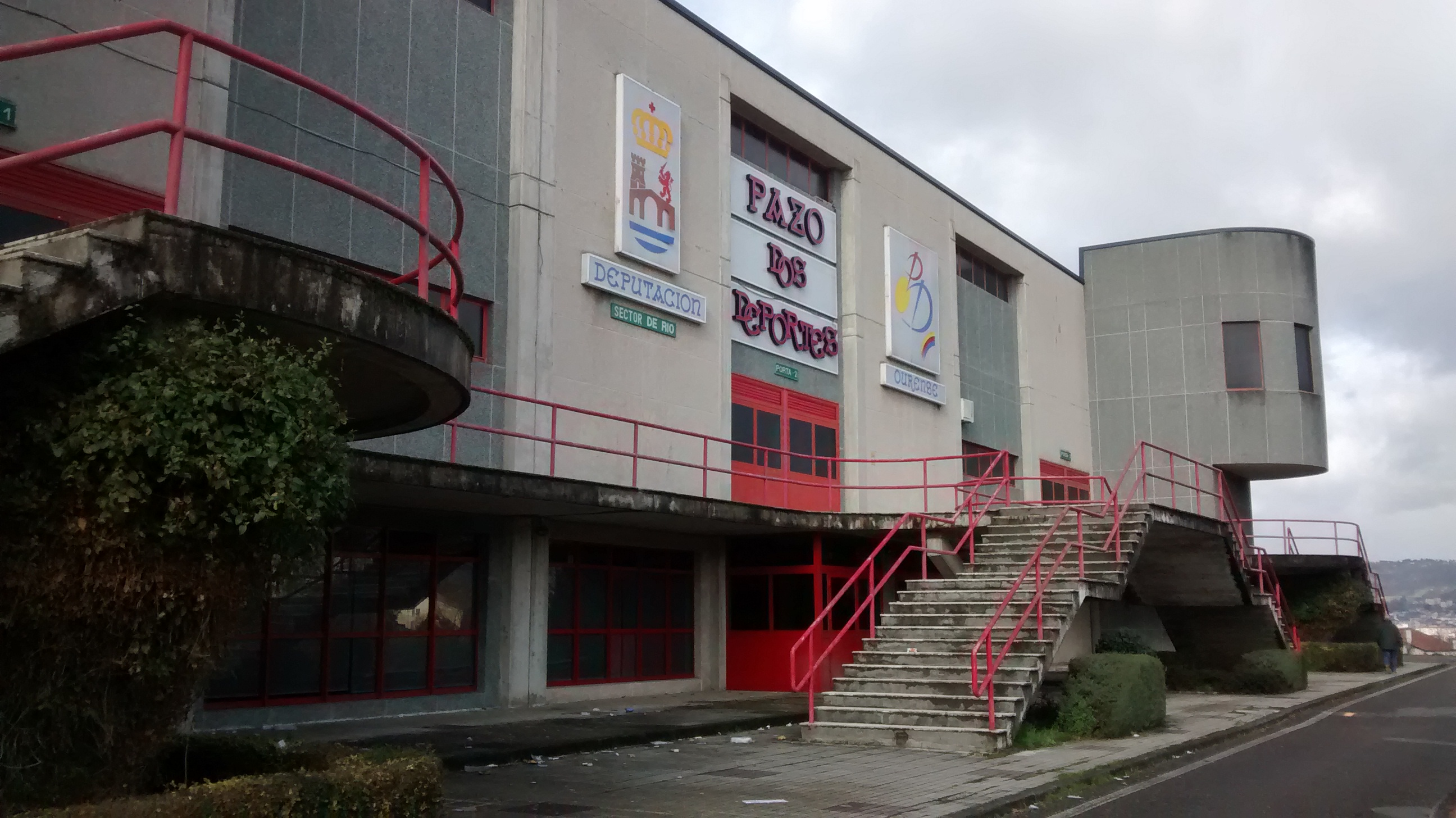
- Pazo Paco Paz
- Interactive map of Pazo Paco Paz
- Full name: Pazo Provincial dos Deportes Paco Paz
- Location: Ourense, Galicia
- Owner: Ourense Provincial Government
- Capacity: 6,000
- Surface: Parquet Floor

Construction
- Opened: 1988

Tenants
- Club Ourense Baloncesto; Ourense FS

Pazo dos Deportes Paco Paz is a multi-purpose sports arena in Ourense, Galicia, Spain.

Founded in 1988, it is owned by the Deputación de Ourense.
