= Dmitry Flis =

Russian basketball player

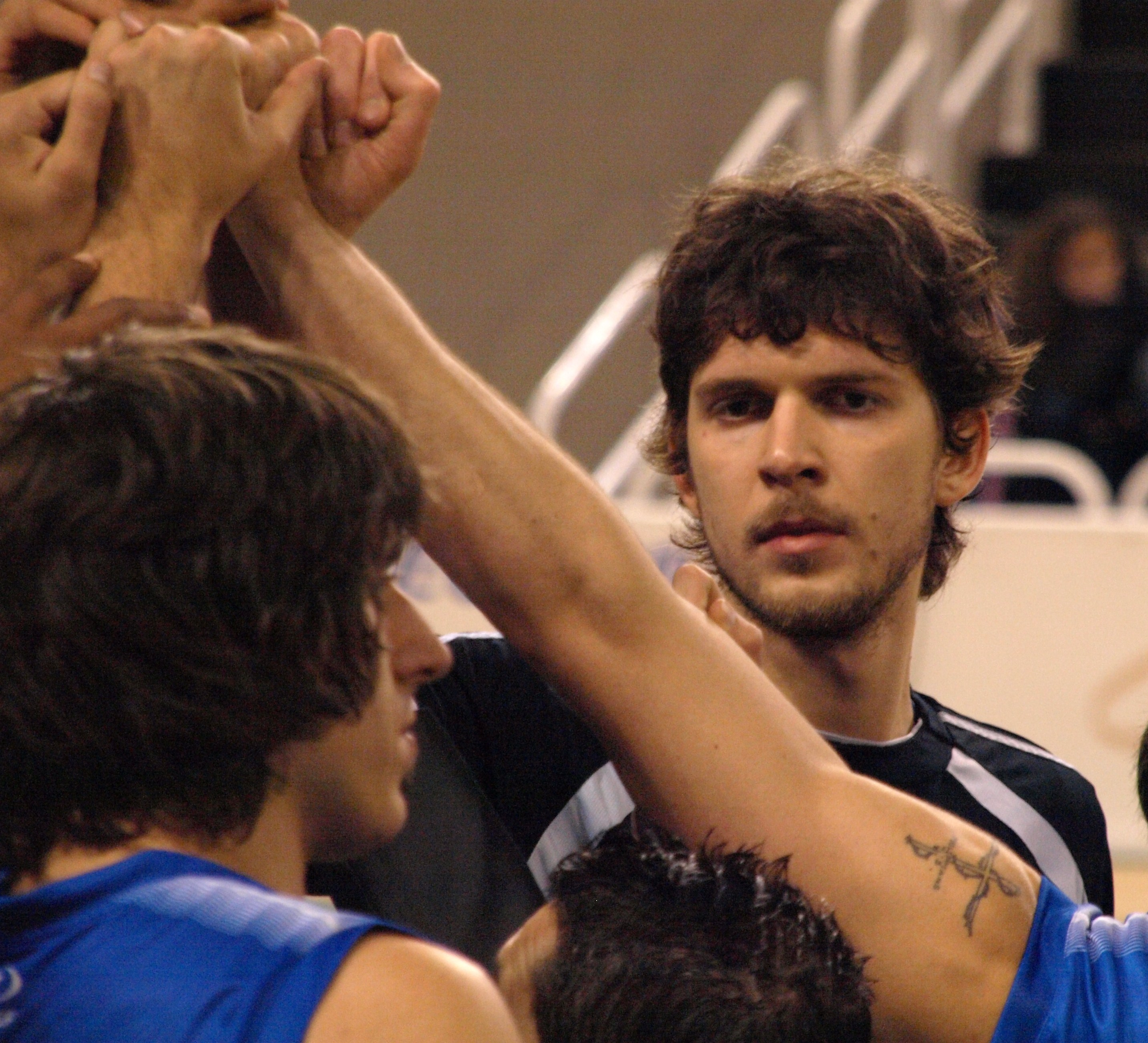

No. 4 – Ciclista Olímpico
- Position: Power forward
- League: Liga Nacional de Básquet

Personal information
- Born: October 2, 1984 (age 42) Kaliningrad, Russian Soviet Federative Socialist Republic, USSR
- Listed height: 6 ft 8 in (2.03 m)
- Listed weight: 220 lb (100 kg)

Career information
- Playing career: 2002–present

Career history
- 2002–2008: Joventut Badalona
- 2002–2004: → Joventut Badalona B
- 2004–2005: →Prat Joventut
- 2008–2009: Lleida Bàsquet
- 2009–2010: Obradoiro CAB
- 2010–2011: Joventut Badalona
- 2011–2013: Andorra
- 2013–2015: Ural Yekaterinburg
- 2015–2016: Manresa
- 2016–2017: Ourense
- 2017–2018: Coruña
- 2018–present: Olimpico

Dmitry Sergeevich Flis (Russian: Дмитрий Сергеевич Флис; born 22 October 1984) is a Russian professional basketball player from Kaliningrad. Flis plays for Ciclista Olímpico in the Liga Nacional de Básquetbol in Argentina.

== Honours ==
DKV Joventut

- FIBA EuroCup: (1)
  - 2005–06
- ULEB Cup: (1)
  - 2007–08
- Copa del Rey: (1)
  - 2008
- Lliga Catalana: (1)
  - 2005

Plus Pujol Lleida

- LEB Catalan League Champion: (1)
  - 2008
