= CB Lucentum Alicante =

Basketball team in Valencian Community, Spain

Lucentum Alicante
- Leagues: LEB Oro
- Founded: 1994
- History: CB Lucentum Alicante (1994–Present)
- Arena: Pabellón Pedro Ferrándiz
- Location: Alicante, Valencian Community
- Team colors: White, Blue, Navy Blue
- President: Luis Castillo
- Head coach: Rubén Perelló
- Championships: 2 LEB Oro championships
- Website: cblucentum.com
Home	Away

Club Baloncesto Lucentum Alicante is a professional basketball team based in Alicante, Valencian Community. Lucentum Alicante played in Liga ACB for the last time in 2012, after selling its place in the league to CB Canarias.

In August 2015, due to its financial problems, it gave its place in LEB Plata to the Fundación Lucentum Baloncesto, created two months before to save the basketball of the city.

== Sponsorship naming ==
Lucentum Alicante has had several sponsorship names during its history:

- Ernesto Electrodomésticos 1994–1996
- Proaguas Costablanca 2000–2001
- Etosa Alicante 2002–2007
- Alicante Costablanca 2007–2008
- Meridiano Alicante 2009–2011

== Team logos ==
Non commercial logo

2009–2011

== Season by season ==
Season	Tier	Division	Pos.	W–L	Copa del Rey	Other cups		European competitions		
1994–95	2	Liga EBA	4th	24–14						
1995–96	2	Liga EBA	11th	15–20						
1996–97	2	LEB	8th	19–16						
1997–98	2	LEB	7th	15–17						
1998–99	2	LEB	11th	12–19		Copa Príncipe	QF			
1999–00	2	LEB	1st	30–12		Copa Príncipe	QF			
2000–01	1	Liga ACB	17th	9–25						
2001–02	2	LEB	1st	27–1–12		Copa Príncipe	C			
2002–03	1	Liga ACB	8th	19–19						
2003–04	1	Liga ACB	14th	14–20				2 ULEB Cup	RS	3–7
2004–05	1	Liga ACB	6th	25–14	Quarterfinalist					
2005–06	1	Liga ACB	12th	14–20				2 ULEB Cup	R16	6–6
2006–07	1	Liga ACB	17th	12–22						
2007–08	2	LEB Oro	4th	26–12		Copa Príncipe	RU			
2008–09	2	LEB Oro	2nd	29–10		Copa Príncipe	C			
2009–10	1	Liga ACB	15th	13–21						
2010–11	1	Liga ACB	16th	9–25						
2011–12	1	Liga ACB	8th (Note: Sold its berth in ACB to the League. It was finally occupied by Iberostar Canarias.)	18–18	Quarterfinalist					
2012–13	2	LEB Oro	2nd (Note: Resigned to any place in professional basketball and decided to join Primera División, the fifth tier.)	27–11						
2013–14	5	1ª División	1st (Note: Achieved a vacant berth in LEB Plata.)	27–1						
2014–15	3	LEB Plata	5th	22–14						

== Trophies and awards ==
=== Trophies ===
- LEB Oro: (2)
  - 2000, 2002
- Copa Príncipe: (2)
  - 2002, 2009
- Lliga Valenciana: (3)
  - 2004, 2006, 2011

=== Individual awards ===
All-ACB Team

- Lou Roe – 2004

== Notable former players ==
Numerous NBA players played at CB Lucentum before or after their NBA career. In 2020, local newspaper Diario Información listed some of the best ever CB Lucentum players.

- (Spain) Lucio Angulo
- (Spain) José Manuel Calderón
- (Spain) Iñaki de Miguel
- (Spain) Oriol Junyent
- (Spain) Pedro Llompart
- (Spain) Nacho Rodríguez
- (Spain) Txemi Urtasun
- (Spain) Carlos Cazorla
- (Spain) Guillermo Rejón
- (Argentina) Pepe Sánchez
- (Argentina) Pablo Prigioni
- (Canada) Andy Rautins
- (Canada) Rowan Barrett
- (Croatia) Bruno Šundov
- (Croatia) Velimir Perasović
- (Croatia) Mario Stojić
- (France) Thomas Heurtel
- (France) Alain Digbeu
- (Jamaica) Martin Keane
- (Kosovo) Justin Doellman
- (Lithuania) Mindaugas Katelynas
- (Lithuania) Martynas Andriuškevičius
- (Serbia) Vule Avdalović
- (United States) Lou Roe
- (United States) Larry Lewis
- (United States) Kyle Singler
- (United States) Mario Austin
- (United States) DeMarco Johnson
- (United States) Marlon Maxey
- (United States) Amal McCaskill
- (United States) Quincy Lewis
- (United States) John Williams
- (United States) Darryl Middleton
- (Turkey) Serkan Erdoğan
- (Bulgaria) Kaloyan Ivanov
