= Força Lleida CE =

Ilerna Lleida
- League: Liga ACB
- Founded: 2012; 14 years ago
- Arena: Espai Fruita Barris Nord
- Capacity: 6.100
- Location: Lleida, Spain
- Team colors: Bordeaux, white and blue
- President: Albert Aliaga
- Head coach: Gerard Encuentra
- Website: flleida.cat
Home	Away	Third

Força Lleida Club Esportiu, also known as Ilerna Lleida for sponsorship reasons, is a professional basketball club based in Lleida, Spain. It plays in the Liga ACB with its home games played at the Espai Fruita Barris Nord.

== History ==
The creation of a new club in Lleida

The club born in the summer of 2012 with the aim to substitute CE Lleida Bàsquet, which had several economic problems. Força Lleida took the vacant CE Lleida Bàsquet left in Primera FEB, the Spanish second tier division of basketball.

The Primera FEB era

In its first season, Força Lleida qualified for the playoffs, after finalizing 7th in regular season, but was eliminated in the quarterfinals against Palencia Baloncesto. The next season, the team got the same number of victories than the past year (11), but this time just could get the 10th position.

In 2015 the club achieved its best performance after reaching the semifinals of the playoffs against Club Ourense Baloncesto, but just one season later, Força Lleida finished in the last position becoming relegated to LEB Plata. But a few months later, the club achieved a vacant berth in the same league from recently promoted FC Barcelona Bàsquet B, who decided to trade their 2nd tier vacant for Força Lleida's 3rd division vacant because of their politics of developing young talent. This meant Força Lleida avoided the descent and could play in Primera FEB the next season.

In 2017, despite the team finished the competition with more victories than lost games, they just could get the tenth position at the table, thus not qualifying for the postseason.

The promotion to Liga ACB

Força Lleida were granted promotion to Liga ACB, the first division of Spanish basketball following the 2023–24 season, after beating CB Lucentum Alicante, CB San Pablo Burgos and finally Movistar Estudiantes in the final of the promotion playoffs. They finished 2nd the regular season that year. Winning the promotion playoffs meant they were granted a license in Liga ACB. The 2024–25 season marked Lleida's debut season in the Spanish top level division, which they ended in the 15_{th} position with 11 games won and 23 lost, thus avoiding relegation and staying up in the Spanish first division, Liga ACB for the 2025-26 season.

Currently, they are in Liga ACB and are a low table team and fight for permanence at the Spanish top level of basketball.

== Sponsorship naming ==
- Actel Força Lleida (2014–2018)
- ICG Força Lleida (2018–2024)
- Hiopos Lleida (2024–2026)
- Ilerna Lleida (2026–now)

== Logos ==
Non-commercial logo (2012–2021)

== Season by season ==
Season	Tier	Division	Pos.	W–L	Cup Competitions
2012–13	2	LEB Oro	7th	13–18	
2013–14	2	LEB Oro	10th	11–15	
2014–15	2	LEB Oro	5th	18–15	
2015–16	2	LEB Oro	16th (Note: Remained in the league after achieving a vacant berth.)	9–21	
2016–17	2	LEB Oro	10th	18–16	
2017–18	2	LEB Oro	16th	12–22	
2018–19	2	LEB Oro	11th	16–18	
2019–20	2	LEB Oro	15th (Note: Season curtailed due to the COVID-19 pandemic.)	9–15	
2020–21	2	LEB Oro	17th (Note: Remained in the league after achieving a vacant berth.)	12–14	
2021–22	2	LEB Oro	4th	25–15	
2022–23	2	LEB Oro	7th	23–15	
2023–24	2	LEB Oro	2nd	31–8	
2024–25	1	Liga ACB	15th	11–23	
2025–26	1	Liga ACB	14th	12–22	

== Players ==
=== Current roster ===
Note: Flags indicate national team eligibility at FIBA-sanctioned events. Players may hold other non-FIBA nationalities not displayed.

Ilerna Lleida roster
Players
Coaches

Pos.	No.	Nat.	Name	Ht.	Age
PG	0	(United States) (Armenia)	McGhee, Darius	1.74 m (5 ft 9 in)	27 – 2 June 1999
SG	1	(United States)	Batemon, James	1.85 m (6 ft 1 in)	29 – 8 April 1997
PF	3	(Canada) (Nigeria)	Ejim, Melvin	2.01 m (6 ft 7 in)	35 – 4 March 1991
SF	5	(Spain)	Paulí, Oriol (C)	2.01 m (6 ft 7 in)	32 – 20 May 1994
PG	6	(Spain)	García, Dani	1.85 m (6 ft 1 in)	28 – 30 January 1998
SG	8	(United States) (Spain)	Hughes, Mark	1.99 m (6 ft 6 in)	29 – 15 February 1997
C	12	(Senegal)	Diagne, Atoumane (injured)	2.15 m (7 ft 1 in)	27 – 31 December 1998
PG	13	(Spain)	Rodríguez, Adrià (injured)	1.94 m (6 ft 4 in)	23 – 28 April 2003
SF	14	(Spain)	Sanz, Mikel	1.99 m (6 ft 6 in)	27 – 1 February 1999
PF	22	(United States) (Lithuania)	Shurna, John	2.06 m (6 ft 9 in)	36 – 30 April 1990
C	23	(South Sudan) (United States)	Kuath, Kur	2.08 m (6 ft 10 in)	28 – 12 August 1998
C	25	(France)	Perrin, Zacharie	2.08 m (6 ft 10 in)	22 – 30 August 2004
PG	51	(Spain)	Torrens, Pau (Y)	1.90 m (6 ft 3 in)	18 – 24 December 2007
C	55	(Sweden)	Martenson, Kaspar (Y)	2.08 m (6 ft 10 in)	21 – 5 February 2005
SF	56	(Spain)	Pou, Alexis (Y)	1.92 m (6 ft 4 in)	21 – 7 June 2005

Head coach

- (Spanish Basketball Federation) Gerard Encuentra

Assistant coach(es)

- (Spanish Basketball Federation) Jordi Ribas
- (Spanish Basketball Federation) Mikel Garitaonandia

Legend

- (C) Team captain
- (Y) Youth player
- Injured

- Roster
- Transactions
Updated: October 25, 2026

=== Depth chart ===
Pos.	Starting 5	Bench	Bench 3	Inactive
C	Zacharie Perrin	Kur Kuath *	Kaspar Martenson ‡	Atoumane Diagne † (injured)
PF	Melvin Ejim	John Shurna
SF	Oriol Paulí †	Mikel Sanz †	Alexis Pou ‡
SG	James Batemon *	Mark Hughes	Pau Torrens ‡
PG	Darius McGhee	Dani García †		Adrià Rodríguez † (injured)

Notes: Blue † – homegrown player; (Note: A homegrown player is a player that played for at least three years before the age of 20 on a Spanish team. In Liga ACB, the team must register at least four homegrown players in rosters of 10–12 players or at least three homegrown players in rosters of 8–9 players.) Red * – overseas player; (Note: An overseas player is a player from outside EEA, FIBA Europe or ACP states. In Liga ACB, the team may register at most two overseas players.) Green ‡ – youth player (Note: In Liga ACB, the team may register under-22 players linked to the youth system.)

== Trophies and awards ==
=== Trophies ===
- Lliga Catalana LEB: (3)
  - 2012, 2022, 2023

== Notable players ==
Note: Flags indicate national team eligibility at FIBA-sanctioned events. Players may hold other non-FIBA nationalities not displayed.

Criteria

To appear in this section a player must have either:

- Set a club record or won an individual award while at the club
- Played at least one official international match for their national team at any time
- Played at least one official NBA match at any time.

- (Spain) Fran Guerra
- (Spain) Oriol Paulí
- (Spain) Pierre Oriola
- (Spain) Rafa Villar
- (Spain) Víctor Arteaga
- (Argentina) Juani Marcos
- (Austria) Thomas Schreiner
- (The Bahamas) Michael Carey
- (Bulgaria) / (United States) Dee Bost
- (Canada) / (Nigeria) Melvin Ejim
- (Chile) Nacho Varela
- (Croatia) Luka Božić
- (Dominican Republic) Eddy Polanco
- (Estonia) Kregor Hermet
- (Finland) Alexander Madsen
- (Latvia) Kaspars Vecvagars
- (Latvia) Kristers Zoriks
- (Lithuania) Osvaldas Matulionis
- (Netherlands) Keye van der Vuurst
- (Nigeria) Caleb Agada
- (Portugal) Diogo Brito
- (Puerto Rico) Emmanuel Andújar
- (Senegal) Ibou Badji
- (Slovenia) Edo Murić
- (Slovenia) Luka Rupnik
- (South Sudan) Kur Kuath
- (Ukraine) Volodymyr Gerun
- (United States) Cameron Krutwig
- (United States) Corey Walden
- (United States) James Batemon
- (United States) John Shurna
- (United States) Kenny Hasbrouck
- (Venezuela) Michael Carrera
