= Pabellón Pedro Ferrándiz =

Arena in Alicante, Spain

Coordinates: 38°21′14.5″N 00°29′40.5″W

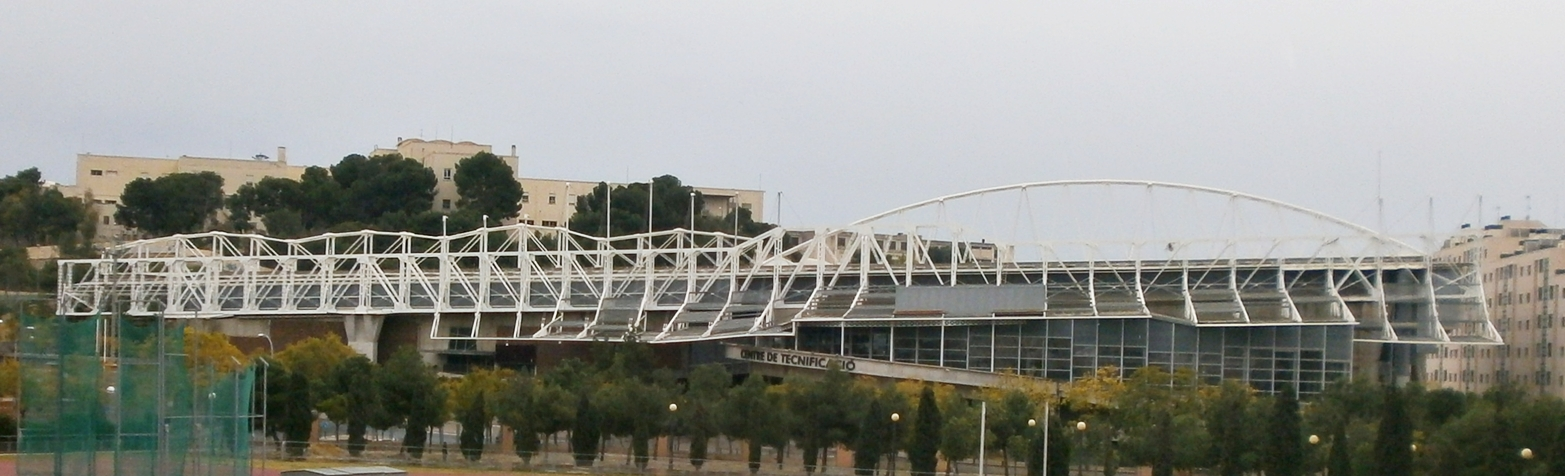
- Interactive map of Pabellón Pedro Ferrándiz
- Former names: Centro de Tecnificación (1993–2014)
- Location: Alicante, Spain
- Capacity: 5,425 Basketball

Construction
- Opened: 1993
- Architect: Enric Miralles

Tenants
- CB Lucentum Alicante (basketball) (1994–2014); Fundación Lucentum Baloncesto (2015–present)

Pabellón Pedro Ferrándiz is an arena, designed by Enric Miralles, in Alicante, Spain. Formerly named as Centro de Tecnificación de Alicante, it changed its name in honour to the Spanish basketball coach and member of the Basketball Hall of Fame Pedro Ferrándiz on 14 January 2014.

The arena holds 5,425 people. It is primarily used for basketball and the home arena of Fundación Lucentum Baloncesto.

== Main events ==
One of the groups of the EuroBasket 2007 was played at this arena. Bob Dylan performed at this location during his 2008 European Tour on July 2, 2008.
