= Josep Clarós =

Spanish basketball coach (born 1969)

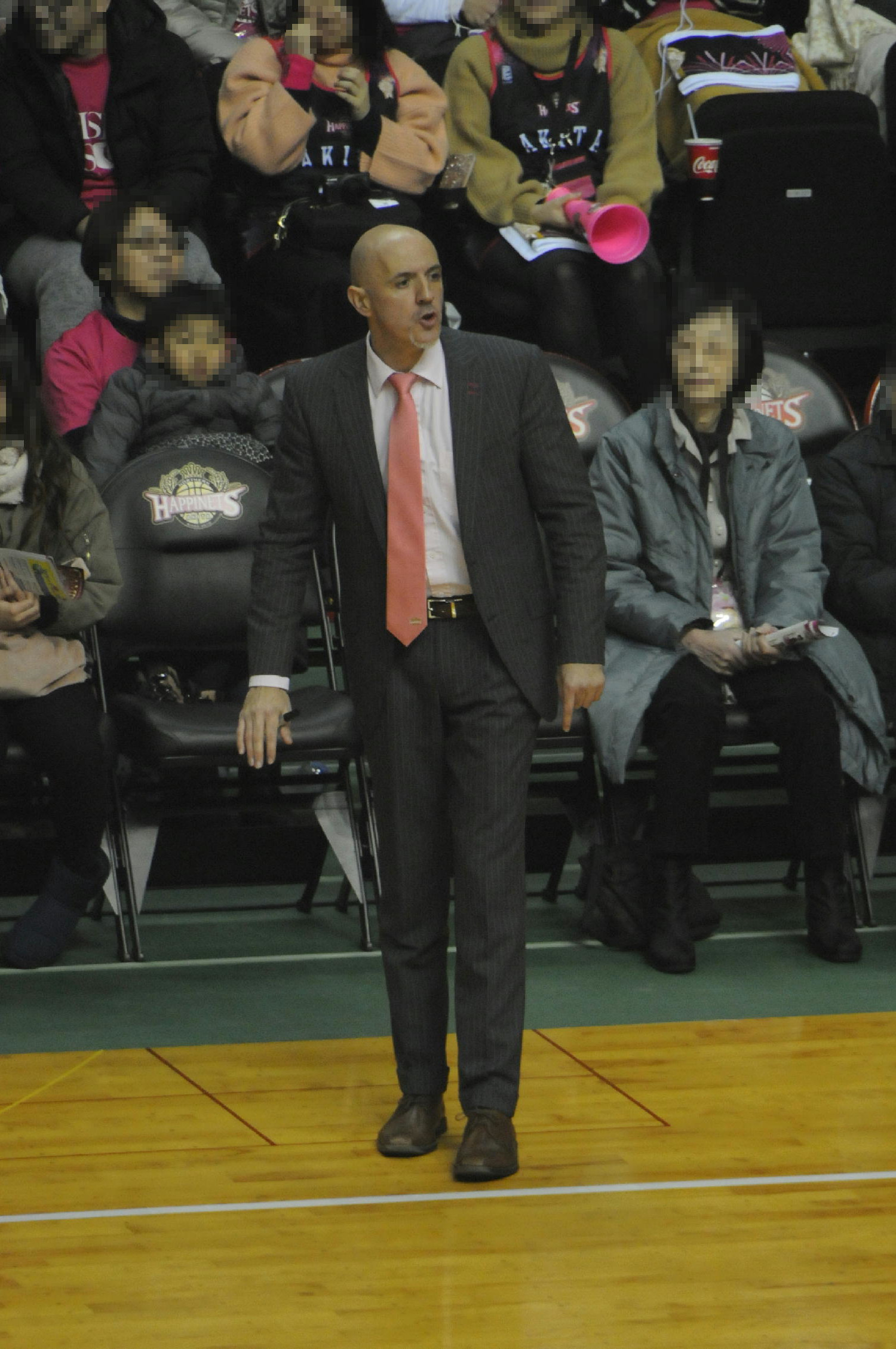

Angola men's national basketball team
- Position: Head coach

Personal information
- Born: January 28, 1969 (age 57) Barcelona, Spain

Career information
- College: University of Barcelona

Career history

Coaching
- 1993–1994: NE Missouri State (assistant coach)
- 1995–1997: American University (PR)
- 1995: El Salvador
- 1997: Correcaminos UAT Reynosa
- 1998: Trotamundos de Carabobo
- 1999: Correcaminos Reynosa
- 1999–2000: Fort Wayne Fury (assistant coach)
- 2000–2002: Ulla Oil Rosalía
- 2002–2005: Tarragona
- 2004–2006: CAB Madeira
- 2007–2008: Donar
- 2008–2009: Joventut Badalona (assistant)
- 2009–2010: Joventut Badalona
- 2010–2011: Joventut Badalona (assistant)
- 2011–2012: Halifax Rainmen
- 2010–2013: Mexico
- 2012–2013: Pioneros de Cancún
- 2014–2015: Halifax Rainmen
- 2015–2016: Al-Muharraq SC
- 2016: Rizing Fukuoka
- 2016–2017: Manama Club
- 2017–2019: Akita Northern Happinets
- 2019: Bahrain
- 2020–2021: Rizing Zephyr Fukuoka
- 2021–present: Angola

Career highlights
- Portuguese Cup winner (2005); Eurobasket.com Portuguese League Coach of the Year (2005); Lliga Catalana champion (2009); Central American and Caribbean Games Coach of the Year (2010); FIBA Americas League champion (2012); NBL Canada Coach of the Year (2015); Bahraini League champion (2017); B. League Division 2 (2018)
Medals
Men's basketball
Head coach for Angola
AfroBasket
Gold medal – first place	2025 Angola
Head coach for Mexico
Central American and Caribbean Games
Silver medal – second place	2010 Mayagüez

Josep "Pep" Clarós Canals (born January 28, 1969) is a Spanish professional basketball coach with experience in Europe, Asia, Africa, North and South America.

He has been in 15 Finals so far with different teams in different countries as a Head coach. He has NCAA, CBA, ACB, Eurocup, Uleb, Euroleague, Liga de las Americas, Olympic Games Tournament, Afrobasket and World Cup Qualifiers. He has been Head Coach with 5 National Teams. He is the first coach (in any sport) in history who has won a championship or medal in four different continents as a head coach.

== International career ==
En 2012, Clarós won la Liga de las Americas in Formosa, Argentina .On March 27, 2015, Clarós, who was planning to coach the Egypt national basketball team at the 2015 FIBA Africa Championship and potentially the 2016 Summer Olympics, confirmed that he would not. He said, "I wish them all the best for the next AfroBasket and African games with the goal to qualify for the Olympics in Rio 2016." He loves to implement a full court press defence.

In 2017, Clarós signed with Akita Northern Happinets in Japan.

In 2020, he signed with Rizing Zephyr Fukuoka.

== Head coaching record ==
Legend
Regular season	G	Games coached	W	Games won	L	Games lost	W–L %	Win–loss %
Playoffs	PG	Playoff games	PW	Playoff wins	PL	Playoff losses	PW–L %	Playoff win–loss %

‡	B2 record

Team	Year	G	W	L	W–L%	Finish	PG	PW	PL	PW–L%	Result
Ulla Oil Rosalía	2000-01	30	10	20	.333	13th	-	-	-	–	-
Ulla Oil Rosalía	2001-02	30	10	20	.333	13th	-	-	-	–	-
CB Tarragona	2002-03	30	12	18	.400	12th	-	-	-	–	-
CB Tarragona	2003-04	34	15	19	.441	13th	-	-	-	–	-
CB Tarragona	2004-05	34	18	16	.529	7th	4	1	3	.250	Lost in 1st Round
Hanzevast Capitals	2007-08	40	24	16	.600	5th	3	1	2	.333	Lost in 1st Round
Halifax Rainmen	2011-12	36	23	13	.639	2nd	8	5	3	.625	Runners-up
Pioneros de Quintana Roo	2012-13	40	28	12	.700	6th	8	4	4	.500	Lost in 2nd Round
Halifax Rainmen	2014-15	32	20	12	.625	1st in Atlantic	16	10	4	.714	Runners-up
Al Muharraq	2015-16	5	3	2	.600	5th	-	-	-	–	-
Rizing Fukuoka	2016	12	6	6	.500	8th in Bj Western	2	0	2	.000	Lost in 1st Round
Al Manama	2016-17	16	15	0	1.000	1st	6	5	1	.833	Champions
Akita Northern Happinets	2017-18	60	54	6	.900‡	1st in B2 Eastern	5	3	2	.600	Runners-up in B2
Akita Northern Happinets	2018-19	60	17	43	.283	5th in Eastern	-	-	-	–	-
Rizing Zephyr Fukuoka	2019-20	15	4	11	.267	6th in B2 Western	-	-	-	–	-
Rizing Zephyr Fukuoka	2020-21	59	26	33	.441	5th in B2 Western	-	-	-	–	-
