= Primera FEB =

Spanish second basketball division

- Formerly: Liga LEB (1996–2007); LEB Oro (2007–2024)
- Founded: 1996; 30 years ago
- First season: 1996–97
- Country: Spain
- Confederation: FIBA Europe
- Number of teams: 18
- Level on pyramid: 2
- Promotion to: Liga ACB
- Relegation to: Segunda FEB
- Domestic cup(s): Spain Cup; Copa Princesa de Asturias (defunct)
- Current champions: Obradoiro CAB (1st title) (2025–26)
- Most championships: UCAM Murcia CB; Gipuzkoa Basket; CB Breogán (3 titles)
- TV partners: LaLiga+
- Website: primerafeb.com
- 2026–27 season

Former LEB Oro logo (2015–2024).

The Primera FEB, formerly known as LEB or LEB Oro, is the second basketball division of the Spanish basketball league system after the Liga ACB. It is run by the FEB. The FEB leagues are divided into three categories (the other two are the Segunda FEB and the Tercera FEB). The league was founded in 1996 and is played under FIBA rules.

The league is contested by 18 clubs. Each season, the top-finishing team in the Primera FEB are automatically promoted to the Liga ACB. The teams that finish the season in 2nd to 9th place enter a playoff tournament, with the winner also gaining promotion to the Liga ACB. The three lowest-finishing teams in the Primera FEB are relegated to Segunda FEB.

A total of 81 teams have competed in Primera FEB since its inception in 1996. 19 teams have been crowned champions and 30 teams have gained promotion to Liga ACB, of which only four teams could not play in Liga ACB. Club Melilla Baloncesto is the only team that played all seasons of the league.

== Championship format ==
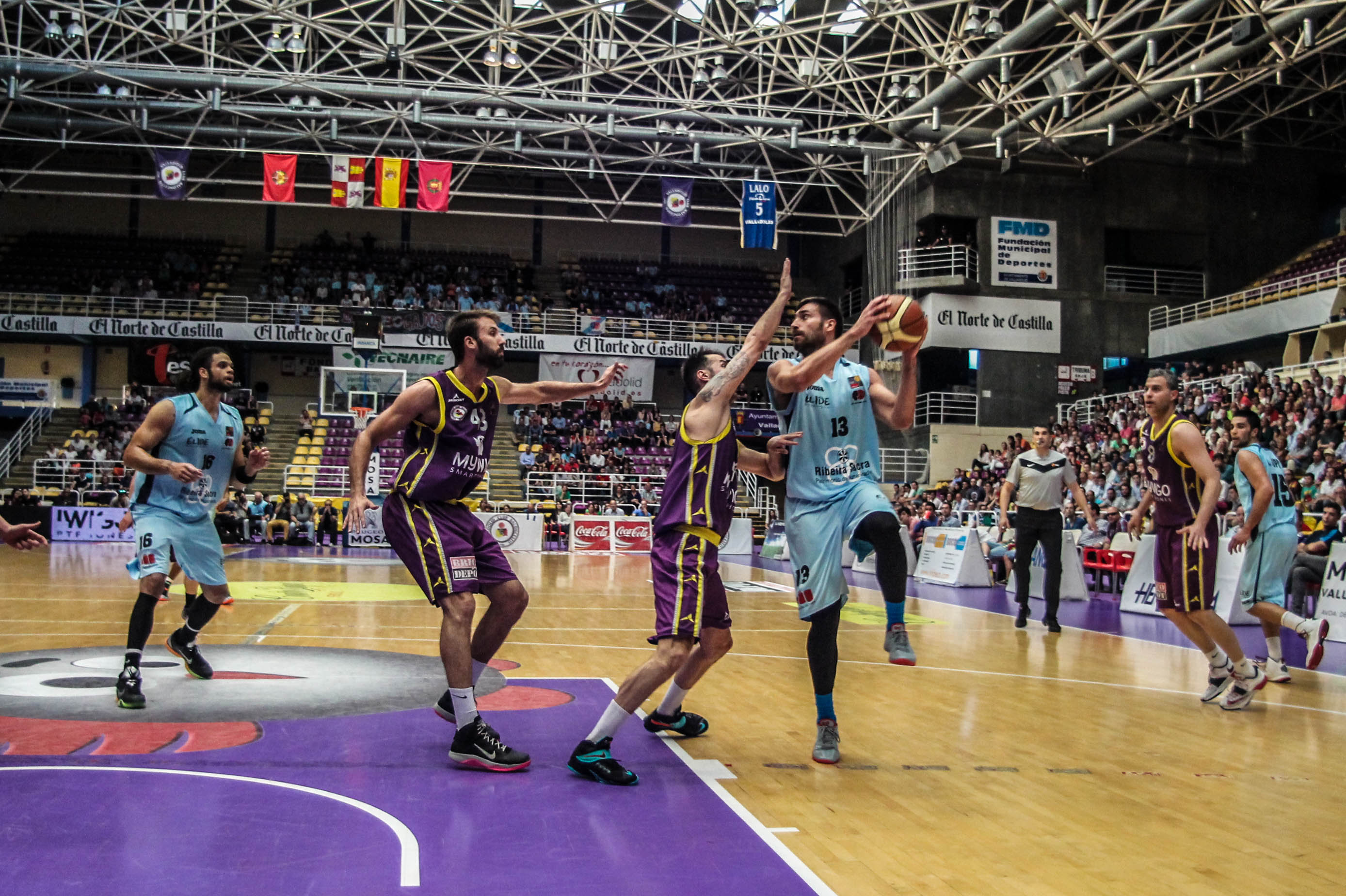
A 2015 playoffs game between CB Valladolid and CB Breogán.

Each team of has to play with all the other teams of its division twice, once at home and the other at the opponent's arena.

Each victory adds two points to the team in the league ranking, while each loss adds only one. At the end of the league:

- The winner of the Regular season promotes directly to Liga ACB.
- Teams qualified between second and ninth position play the promotion play-offs, where the winner promotes with the regular season champion to Liga ACB.
- The worst or the two worst teams are relegated to LEB Plata.

At the half of the league, the two first teams in the table play the Copa Princesa at home of the winner of the first half season. The Champion of this Cup will play the play-offs as first qualified if it finishes the league between the 2nd and the 5th qualified.

== LEB History ==
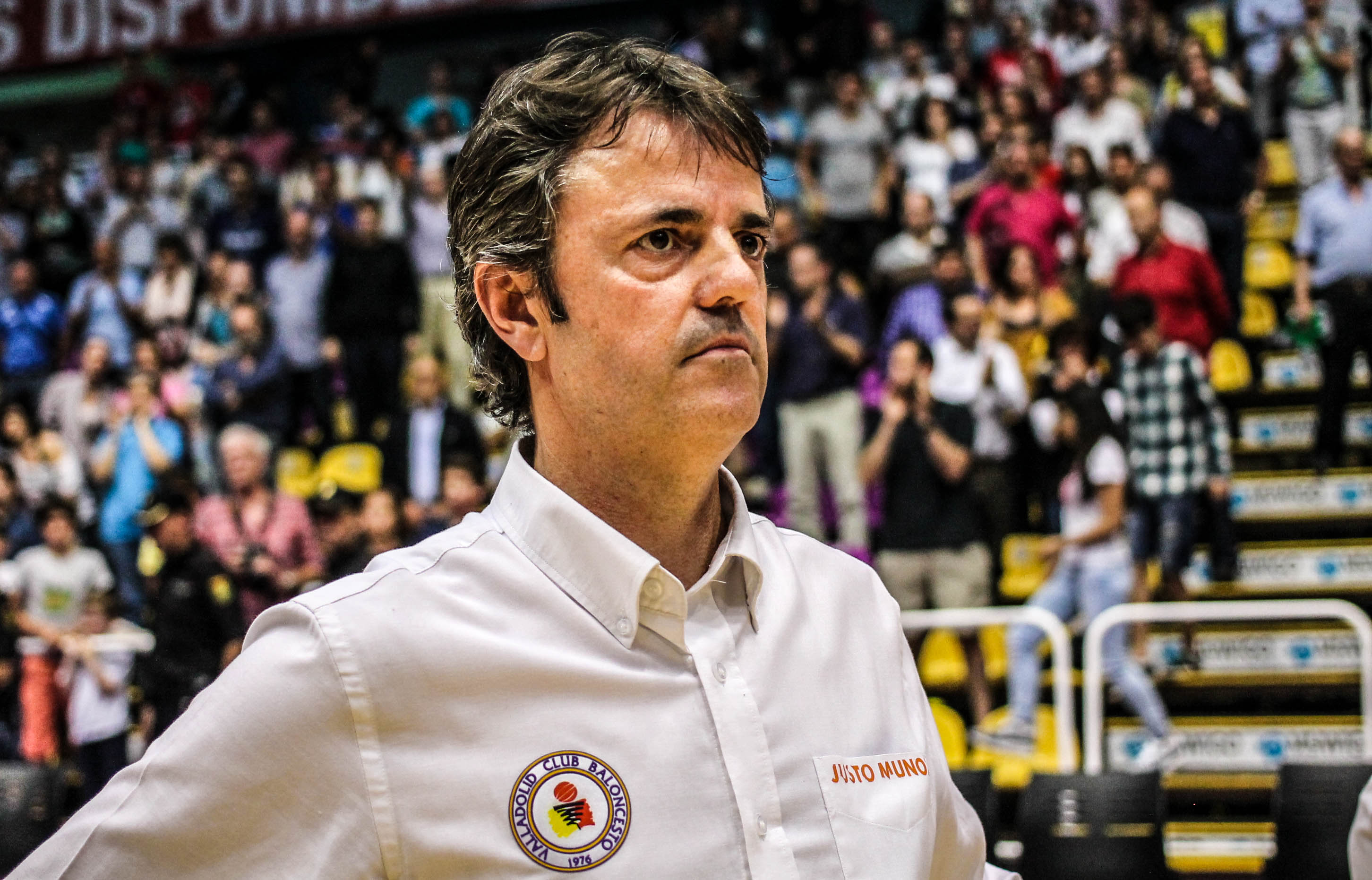
Porfirio Fisac achieved three titles and collaborated in other one before leaving.

The two first teams are promoted to ACB. Since 2007–08, the regular season champion promotes to ACB without playing the playoffs. The winner of the Playoffs Finals is the other promoted team.

=== League names ===
- 1996–2006: LEB
- 2006–2007: Adecco LEB
- 2007–2015: Adecco Oro
- 2015–2024: LEB Oro
- From 2024 onwards: Primera FEB

=== Champions ===
Season	Champion	Runner-up	MVP	Winning Coach
1996–97	CB Ciudad de Huelva	Caja Cantabria	(United States) Bob Harstad	(Spain) Sergio Valdeolmillos
1997–98	Murcia Artel	Baloncesto Fuenlabrada	(United States) Tony Smith	(Spain) Felipe Coello
1998–99	Breogán Universidade	Cabitel Gijón	(United States) Eric Cuthrell	(Spain) Paco García
1999–00	CB Lucentum Alicante	Club Ourense Baloncesto	(United States) Joe Bunn	(Spain) Andreu Casadevall
2000–01	Caprabo Lleida	CB Granada	(United States) Michael Wilson	(Spain) Edu Torres
2001–02	CB Lucentum Alicante	Minorisa.net Manresa	(United States) Lawrence Lewis	(Argentina) Julio Lamas
2002–03	Etosa Murcia	Unelco Tenerife	(Dominican Republic) Jaime Peterson	(Spain) Felipe Coello
2003–04	Bilbao Basket	CB Granada	(United States) Aaron Swinson	(Spain) Txus Vidorreta
2004–05	Baloncesto Fuenlabrada	IBB Hoteles Menorca	(Spain) Ricardo Guillén	(Spain) Luis Casimiro
2005–06	Bruesa GBC	Polaris World Murcia	(United States) Thomas Terrell	(Spain) Porfirio Fisac
2006–07	Ricoh Manresa	Climalia León	(Spain) Ricardo Guillén	(Spain) Jaume Ponsarnau
2007–08	Basket CAI Zaragoza	Bruesa GBC	(United States) Andy Panko	(Spain) Curro Segura
2008–09	CB Valladolid	CB Lucentum Alicante	(United States) Jakim Donaldson	(Spain) Porfirio Fisac
2009–10	Basket CAI Zaragoza	ViveMenorca	(United States) Jakim Donaldson	(Spain) José Luis Abós
2010–11	CB Murcia	Blu:sens Monbús	(Spain) Ricardo Guillén	(Spain) Luis Guil
2011–12	Iberostar Canarias (Note: Iberostar Canarias initially did not promote to Liga ACB, but finally acquired the spot of Lucentum Alicante for playing in the league.)	Menorca Bàsquet (Note: Team did not promote to Liga ACB in the next season.)	(United States) Jakim Donaldson	(Spain) Alejandro Martínez
2012–13	Ford Burgos (Note: As CB Atapuerca)	CB Lucentum Alicante	(Czech Republic) Ondřej Starosta	(Spain) Andreu Casadevall
2013–14	River Andorra MoraBanc	Ford Burgos (Note: As CB Tizona)	(Spain) Jordi Trias	(Spain) Joan Peñarroya
2014–15	Ford Burgos	Club Ourense Baloncesto	(Spain) Ricardo Guillén	(Spain) Andreu Casadevall
2015–16	Quesos Cerrato Palencia	Club Melilla Baloncesto	(Spain) Óliver Arteaga	(Spain) Porfirio Fisac / (Spain) Sergio García
2016–17	RETAbet.es GBC	San Pablo Inmobiliaria Burgos	(Spain) Jordi Trias	(Spain) Porfirio Fisac
2017–18	Cafés Candelas Breogán	ICL Manresa	(Spain) Jordi Trias	(Spain) Natxo Lezkano
2018–19	Real Betis Energía Plus	RETAbet Bilbao Basket	(Dominican Republic) Tyson Pérez	(Spain) Curro Segura
2019–20	Season curtailed in response to the COVID-19 pandemic. (Note: Carramimbre CBC Valladolid and Delteco Gipuzkoa Basket were jointly declared champions and proposed for promotion to Liga ACB.)			
2020–21	Río Breogán	Covirán Granada	(Denmark) Kevin Larsen	(Spain) Diego Epifanio
2021–22	Covirán Granada	Bàsquet Girona	(Spain) Marc Gasol	(Spain) Pablo Pin
2022–23	MoraBanc Andorra	Zunder Palencia	(Venezuela) Michael Carrera	(Spain) Natxo Lezkano
2023–24	Leyma Coruña	ICG Força Lleida	(United States) Alex Barcello	(Spain) Diego Epifanio
2024–25	Silbö San Pablo Burgos	Real Betis	(United States) Mark Hughes	(Brazil) (Italy) Bruno Savignani
2025–26	Obradoiro CAB	Leyma Coruña	(Denmark) Kevin Larsen	(Spain) Diego Epifanio

==== Performance by club ====
Club	Winners	Runners-up	Promotions	Winning years
UCAM Murcia CB	3	1	4	1997–98, 2002–03, 2010–11
Gipuzkoa Basket	3	1	4	2005–06, 2016–17, 2019–20 (Note: Shared title)
CB Breogán	3	0	3	1998–99, 2017–18, 2020–21
CB Lucentum Alicante	2	2	4	1999–00, 2001–02
Basket Zaragoza	2	0	2	2007–08, 2009–10
BC Andorra	2	0	2	2013–14, 2022–23
Bàsquet Manresa	1	2	3	2006–07
Bilbao Basket	1	1	2	2003–04
Baloncesto Fuenlabrada	1	1	2	2004–05
CB Tizona	1	1	2	2014–15
Palencia Baloncesto	1	1	2	2015–16
Real Betis Baloncesto	1	1	2	2018–19
Básquet Coruña	1	1	2	2023–24
CB San Pablo Burgos	1	1	2	2024–25
Obradoiro CAB	1	1	2	2025–26
Fundación CB Granada	1	1	1	2021–22
CB Ciudad de Huelva	1	0	1	1996–97
CE Lleida Bàsquet	1	0	1	2000–01
CB Valladolid	1	0	1	2008–09
CB Canarias	1	0	1	2011–12
CB Atapuerca	1	0	1	2012–13
CB Ciudad de Valladolid	1	0	1	2019–20
Menorca Bàsquet	0	3	3	
Club Ourense Baloncesto	0	2	2	
CB Granada	0	2	2	
Cantabria Baloncesto	0	1	1	
Gijón Baloncesto	0	1	1	
Tenerife CB	0	1	1	
Baloncesto León	0	1	1	
Club Melilla Baloncesto	0	1	1	
Bàsquet Girona	0	1	1	
Força Lleida CE	0	1	1	

== Records at LEB Oro ==
=== Stats leaders ===
Season	Top rating	PIR	Top scorer	PPG	Top rebounder	RPG	Top Assistant	APG
1996–97	(United States) Bob Harstad	31.72	(United States) Bob Harstad	30.56	(United States) Jermaine Carlton	11.96	(Spain) Jaume Comas	4.73
1997–98	(United States) Tony Smith	25.38	(United States) Tony Smith	25.38	(United States) Eric Cuthrell	10.96	(United States) Tony Smith	3.96
1998–99	(United States) Eric Cuthrell	28.65	(United States) Tony Smith	22.62	(United States) Eric Cuthrell	11.57	(United States) Ronald Rutland	4.38
1999–00	(United States) Joe Bunn	28.23	(United States) Joe Bunn	23.60	(United States) Cedric Moore	10.17	(Spain) Valentín Holgado	4.30
2000–01	(United States) Michael Wilson	23.70	(United States) Howard Brown	23.91	(United States) Michael Wilson	9.53	(Spain) Ernesto Serrano	4.93
2001–02	(United States) Lawrence Lewis	25.03	(Spain) Asier García	19.41	(United States) Lawrence Lewis	10.27	(Spain) Roberto Núñez	4.60
2002–03	(Dominican Republic) Jaime Peterson	22.47	(United States) Howard Brown	18.97	(United States) Willie Walls	14.76	(Spain) Javi Salgado	4.87
2003–04	(United States) Aaron Swinson	23.94	(Nigeria) Ugonna Onyekwe	19.33	(United States) Aaron Swinson	9.44	(Spain) Dani López	4.62
2004–05	(Spain) Ricardo Guillén	23.67	(United States) Aaron Swinson	18.56	(United States) Willie Walls	12.27	(Spain) Sergio Sánchez	4.70
2005–06	(United States) Thomas Terrell	25.33	(United States) Thomas Terrell	19.21	(United States) Robert Battle	8.71	(United States) Andre Turner	4.68
2006–07	(Spain) Ricardo Guillén	20.97	(United States) Malik Dixon	20.65	(United States) Keith Waleskowski	10.70	(Spain) Jorge Jiménez	5.00
2007–08	(United States) Andrew Panko	21.88	(United States) Antwain Barbour	19.44	(United States) Jakim Donaldson	10.00	(Argentina) Lucas Victoriano	5.76
2008–09	(United States) Jakim Donaldson	23.26	(United States) Kammron Taylor	18.05	(United States) Jakim Donaldson	9.50	(Argentina) Diego Ciorciari	6.09
2009–10	(United States) Jakim Donaldson	28.50	(United Kingdom) Darren Phillip	18.15	(United States) Jakim Donaldson	11.06	(Argentina) Diego Ciorciari	4.87
2010–11	(Spain) Ricardo Guillén	24.11	(Spain) Ricardo Guillén	19.11	(United States) Dwayne Curtis	9.24	(Spain) Juan Alberto Aguilar	4.56
2011–12	(United States) Jakim Donaldson	21.29	(United States) Troy DeVries	19.15	(Nigeria) Olaseni Lawal	10.62	(Spain) Joan Carles Bivià	5.12
2012–13	(Czech Republic) Ondřej Starosta	21.73	(Spain) Francis Sánchez	15.73	(Czech Republic) Ondřej Starosta	9.81	(Spain) Dani Pérez	5.50
2013–14	(Spain) Jordi Trias	24.08	(Spain) Ricardo Guillén	16.00	(Spain) Jordi Trias	9.00	(Spain) Mikel Uriz	4.92
2014–15	(Spain) Ricardo Guillén	20.40	(Spain) Ricardo Guillén	16.44	(Trinidad and Tobago) Kyle Rowley	9.07	(Spain) Mikel Uriz	5.18
2015–16	(Spain) Óliver Arteaga	23.18	(Spain) Ricardo Guillén	18.70	(Spain) Óliver Arteaga	9.71	(Spain) Ferran Bassas	6.50
2016–17	(Spain) Jordi Trias	20.50	(United States) Zaid Hearst	20.18	(Spain) Jordi Trias	10.18	(Spain) Dani Pérez	5.58
2017–18	(Ukraine) Volodymyr Gerun	21.13	(United States) Johnny Dee	15.94	(Romania) Emanuel Cățe	8.53	(Spain) Óscar Alvarado	6.38
2018–19	(Dominican Republic) Tyson Pérez	20.46	(United States) Junior Robinson	19.79	(Dominican Republic) Tyson Pérez	10.62	(Spain) Óscar Alvarado	6.18
2019–20	(Senegal) Bamba Fall	20.54	(United States) Frank Bartley	16.25	(Senegal) Bamba Fall	8.58	(Spain) Pedro Llompart	5.91
2020–21	(Denmark) Kevin Larsen	16.81	(Venezuela) Michael Carrera	16.70	(Senegal) Mus Barro	7.70	(Spain) Óscar Alvaradov	5.30
2021–22	(Spain) Marc Gasol	23.45	(United States) Wesley Van Beck	19.50	(Spain) Marc Gasol	8.60	(Spain) Pol Figueras	6.03
2022–23	(Venezuela) Michael Carrera	25.30	(Venezuela) Michael Carrera	20.35	(Venezuela) Michael Carrera	9.30	(Brazil) Rafa Luz	5.96
2023–24	(United States) Alex Barcello	23.42	(United States) Alex Barcello	19.70	(United States) Hasan Varence	7.44	(Spain) Óscar Alvarado	7.15
2024–25	(United States) Kevin Larsen	21.06	(United States) Jalen Cone	16.38	(Czech Republic) Ondřej Balvín	8.04	(Uruguay) Jayson Granger	6.61

=== All-time top performances ===
Active Primera FEB player

==== Games played ====
Rank	Player	Position(s)	Seasons (Note: For active players, the number listed is the number of seasons that player has completed plus the current season.)	Years	Games played
1	Dani Rodríguez (ESP)	PG	17	2003–	558
2	Urko Otegui (ESP)	C	14	2002–2019	542
3	Miki Feliu (ESP)	SF	16	2005–2021	530
4	Jorge García (ESP)	PF	16	1996–2017	512
5	Óliver Arteaga (ESP)	C	15	2005–2023	491
6	A. Galarreta (ESP)	SF	16	2003–2021	480
7	Julio González (ESP)	SF	14	2000–2014	473
8	Pedro Rivero (ESP)	PG	13	2002–2017	451
9	Álex Alba (ESP)	SG	13	1999–2012	449
10	Rafael Huertas (ESP)	SG	14	2004–2021	445

==== Points ====
Rank	Player	Position	Years	Points	Games played	Points per game
1	Ricardo Guillén (ESP)	PF	2004–2016	5,927	353	16.8
2	Óliver Arteaga (ESP)	C	2005–2023	5,249	491	10.7
3	Dani Rodríguez (ESP)	PG	2003–	5,015	524	9.6
4	Jorge García (ESP)	PF	1996–2017	4,968	512	9.7
5	Urko Otegui (ESP)	C	2002–2019	4,832	542	8.9
6	Marc Blanch (ESP)	SG	2005–2022	4,801	444	10.8
7	Pedro Rivero (ESP)	PG	2002–2017	4,388	451	9.7
8	A. Galarreta (ESP)	SF	2003–2021	4,351	480	9.1
6	Julio González (ESP)	SF	2000–2014	4,241	473	9.0
10	Salva Arco (ESP)	SG	2004–2021	4,118	399	10.6

==== Rebounds ====
Rank	Player	Position	Years	Rebounds	Games played	Rebounds per game
1	Urko Otegui (ESP)	C	2002–	2,544	505	5.0
2	Ricardo Guillén (ESP)	PF	2004–2016	2,399	353	6.8
3	Óliver Arteaga (ESP)	C	2005–	2,189	346	6.3
4	Jorge García (ESP)	PF	1996–2017	1,992	512	3.9
5	J. Chagoyen (ESP)	PF	1997–2012	1,926	374	5.1
6	Manu Gómez (ESP)	C	1998–2016	1,843	386	4.8
7	Ondřej Starosta (CZE)	C	2006–2013	1,759	218	8.1
8	A. Reynolds Dean (USA)	C	2000–2007	1,697	227	7.5
9	Manu Coego (ESP)	C	2002–2016	1,655	377	4.4
10	Roger Fornas (ESP)	PF	2004–2018	1,655	421	3.9

==== Assists ====
Rank	Player	Position	Years	Assists	Games played	Assists per game
1	Juanjo Bernabé (ESP)	PG	1999–2012	1,379	395	3.5
2	Pedro Rivero (ESP)	PG	2002–2017	1,312	451	2.9
3	Dani López (ESP)	PG	2002–2016	1,245	372	3.3
4	Dani Rodríguez (ESP)	PG	2003–	1,143	404	2.8
5	Diego Ciorciari (ARG)	PG	2002–2010	1,015	241	4.2
6	Albert Sàbat (ESP)	PG	2005–2015	905	298	3.0
7	Mikel Uriz (ESP)	PG	2010–2017	902	234	3.9
8	Iker Urreizti (ESP)	PG	1998–2011	894	439	2.0
9	Xavier Forcada (ESP)	SG	2006–2017	882	318	2.8
10	Pedro Sala (ESP)	PG	1999–2010	862	292	2.9

==== Steals ====
Rank	Player	Position	Years	Steals	Games played	Steals per game
1	Juanjo Bernabé (ESP)	PG	1999–2012	766	395	1.9
2	Marc Blanch (ESP)	SG	2005–	628	385	1.6
3	Dani López (ESP)	PG	2002–2016	590	372	1.6
4	Urko Otegui (ESP)	C	2002–	580	505	1.1
5	Iker Urreizti (ESP)	PG	1998–2011	535	439	1.2
5	Álex Alba (ESP)	SG	1999–2012	501	449	1.1
7	Adrián Boccia (ARG)	PG	2001–2010	467	266	1.7
8	Pedro Rivero (ESP)	PG	2002–2017	458	451	1.0
9	Juan Liñán (ESP)	SF	1997–2007	439	259	1.7
10	Jorge García (ESP)	PF	1996–2017	439	512	0.9

==== Blocks ====
Rank	Player	Position	Years	Blocks	Games played	Blocks per game
1	Óliver Arteaga (ESP)	C	2005–	303	346	0.9
2	Steve Horton (USA)	C	1997–2007	279	188	1.5
3	Cedric Moore (USA)	C	1996–2000	268	93	2.9
4	A. Reynolds Dean (USA)	C	2000–2007	268	227	1.2
5	Lamont Barnes (USA)	C	2004–2018	251	193	1.3
6	Michel Diouf (SEN)	C	2009–2015	246	174	1.4
7	Sitapha Savané (SEN)	C	2000–2003	244	117	2.1
8	U. Onyekwe (NGR)	PF	2003–2008	241	120	2.0
9	Eric Cuthrell (USA)	C	1997–2006	219	159	1.4
10	Nacho Romero (ESP)	C	2002–2013	218	296	0.7

=== Records in a game ===
- Most points

- 50 by Antwain Barbour (Tenerife) vs. Lucentum on November 21, 2008

- Most rebounds

- 26 by Jakim Donaldson (Canarias) vs. Melilla on February 15, 2008

- Most offensive rebounds

- 21 by Willie Walls (Inca) vs. Gijón on February 8, 2003

- Most defensive rebounds

- 16 by Willie Walls (Inca) vs. Tenerife on April 16, 2003

- Most assists

- 17 by Silas Mills (Calpe) vs. Cantabria on December 12, 2004

- Most three-pointers

- 11 by Tony Smith (Murcia) vs. Tenerife on April 3, 1998 (6,25m)
- 9 by Albert Sàbat (Canarias) vs. Cáceres on March 2, 2011 (6,75m)

- Most steals

- 11 by Gimel Lewis (Cantabria) vs. Gijón on March 30, 2007
- 11 by Jeff Xavier (Palencia) vs. Huesca on September 30, 2011

- Most blocks

- 13 by Lester Earl (Melilla) vs. Coruña on January 18, 2002

- Most PIR

- 65 by Derrell Washington (Pineda de Mar) vs. Askatuak on September 28, 1996

== Current clubs ==
Location of teams in 2026–27 Primera FEB

Team	Home city	Arena	Capacity
Alimerka Oviedo Baloncesto	Oviedo	Palacio de los Deportes	5,340
Bàsquet Menorca	Mahón	Pavelló Menorca	5,115
Bueno Arenas Albacete Basket	Albacete	El Parque	1,000
Caja Rural CB Zamora	Zamora	Ángel Nieto	1,500
Cajasiete Gran Canaria	Las Palmas	Gran Canaria Arena	9,870
Cajasol Coto Córdoba	Córdoba	Vista Alegre	3,500
Club Ourense Baloncesto	Ourense	Pazo Paco Paz	5,500
Covirán Granada	Granada	Palacio de Deportes	8,100
Fibwi Mallorca Bàsquet Palma	Palma	Son Moix	3,800
Grupo Alega Cantabria	Torrelavega	Vicente Trueba	2,688
Grupo Ureta Tizona Burgos	Burgos	Polideportivo El Plantío	2,432
HLA Alicante	Alicante	Pedro Ferrándiz	5,696
Iberolea Palencia	Palencia	Municipal de Deportes	5,012
Insolac Caja'87	Seville	San Pablo	7,242
Inveready Askatuak Gipuzkoa	San Sebastián	Amenabar Arena	11,000
Movistar Estudiantes	Madrid	Movistar Arena	13,109
Movistar Estudiantes	Madrid	Movistar Academy Magariños	600
Palmer Basket Mallorca Palma	Palma	Son Moix	3,800
Partizán de Fuenlabrada	Fuenlabrada	Fernando Martín	5,700

== All-time Primera FEB table ==
The All-time Primera FEB table is an overall record of all match results of every team that has played in Primera FEB since the 1996–97 season. The table is accurate as of the end of the 2019–20 season.

Pos	Team	Seasons	Played	Won	Lost	1st	2nd	3rd	4th	5th	Debut	Since/Last App	Best
1	Melilla	24	828	431	397	–	1	4	2	1	1996–97	1996–97	2
2	Breogán	16	566	347	219	2	–	4	3	1	1996–97	2019–20	1
3	Ourense	16	551	266	285	–	2	1	–	1	1998–99	2012–13	2
4	León	11	421	245	176	–	1	3	1	2	2000–01	2011–12	2
5	Menorca	10	385	226	159	–	3	–	3	2	1997–98	2011–12	2
6	Tenerife	12	421	224	197	–	1	1	3	–	1996–97	2009–10	2
7	Palencia	11	377	204	173	1	–	2	1	2	2009–10	2009–10	1
8	Villa de Los Barrios	12	399	190	209	–	–	–	–	1	1997–98	2008–09	5
9	Ciudad de Huelva	11	390	187	203	1	–	–	2	–	1996–97	2007–08	1
10	Lucentum	8	292	185 (Note: One game tied.)	106	2	2	–	1	–	1996–97	2012–13	1
11	Murcia	8	289	182	107	3	1	–	–	1	1997–98	2010–11	1
12	Coruña	12	390	178	212	–	–	1	–	1	1998–99	2012–13	3
13	Zaragoza	7	266	170	96	2	–	1	2	–	2002–03	2009–10	1
14	Cáceres Ciudad	10	348	162	186	–	–	–	–	2	2008–09	2015–16	5
15	Lleida	8	291	157	134	1	–	1	–	–	1999–00	2011–12	1
16	Inca	11	366	156	210	–	–	–	–	1	1996–97	2007–08	5
17	Atapuerca	7	262	155	107	1	–	2	–	–	2006–07	2012–13	1
18	La Palma	9	318	144	174	–	–	–	–	–	2003–04	2011–12	7
19	Peñas	11	351	141	210	–	–	1	–	–	1996–97	2010–11	3
20	Gijón	8	273	135	138	–	1	–	–	1	1996–97	2006–07	2
21	Oviedo	7	236	127	109	–	–	–	–	2	2013–14	2013–14	5
22	Cantabria	7	246	125	121	–	1	–	–	1	1996–97	2007–08	2
23	Manresa	4	167	117	49	1	2	1	–	–	2000–01	2017–18	1
24	Tarragona	8	282	115	167	–	–	–	–	–	2002–03	2011–12	7
25	Força Lleida	8	246	106	140	–	–	–	–	1	2012–13	2012–13	5
26	Bahía San Agustín	6	198	105	93	–	–	1	–	–	2014–15	2014–15	3
27	Canarias	5	185	104	81	1	–	–	–	1	2007–08	2011–12	1
28	Gipuzkoa	4	137	97	40	2	2	–	–	–	2005–06	2019–20	1
29	Clavijo	7	219	86	133	–	–	–	–	–	2011–12	2017–18	8
30	Navarra	6	191	83	108	–	–	–	1	–	2010–11	2015–16	4
31	Bilbao	3	119	79	40	1	1	–	–	–	2002–03	2018–19	1
32	Juventud Córdoba	6	192	78	114	–	–	–	–	1	1996–97	2001–02	5
33	Granada	4	155	76	79	–	2	–	–	–	1999–00	2011–12	2
34	Andorra	3	106	72	34	1	–	1	1	–	1996–97	2013–14	1
35	Axarquía	6	196	71	125	–	–	–	–	–	2008–09	2013–14	7
36	Castelló	5	160	68	92	–	–	–	–	–	2015–16	2015–16	7
37	Prat	5	168	67	101	–	–	–	1	–	2014–15	2018–19	4
38	Rosalía de Castro	6	202	65	137	–	–	–	–	–	1999–00	2008–09	8
39	Barcelona B	6	184	64	120	–	–	–	–	–	2012–13	2018–19	10
40	Sant Josep Girona	3	115	58	57	–	–	–	1	–	2009–10	2011–12	4
41	Fuenlabrada	2	77	57	20	1	1	–	–	–	1997–98	2004–05	1
42	Ciudad de Valladolid	3	100	55	45	1	–	–	–	–	2017–18	2017–18	1
43	Miraflores	2	73	51	22	–	1	–	1	–	2015–16	2016–17	2
44	Alcúdia	3	110	51	59	–	–	–	–	–	2005–06	2007–08	8
45	Tizona	2	63	49	14	1	1	–	–	–	2013–14	2013–14	1
46	Plasencia	3	107	49	58	–	–	–	–	1	2003–04	2005–06	5
47	Valladolid	2	68	47	21	1	–	–	1	–	2008–09	2014–15	1
48	Círculo Badajoz	3	100	45	55	–	–	–	–	1	1998–99	2000–01	5
49	L'Hospitalet	3	105	44	61	–	–	–	–	–	2005–06	2007–08	6
50	Mallorca	3	102	43	59	–	–	–	–	–	2008–09	2011–12	12
51	Gandía	3	107	40	67	–	–	–	–	–	2006–07	2008–09	14
52	Obradoiro	1	45	37	8	–	1	–	–	–	2010–11	2010–11	2
53	Araberri	3	102	36	66	–	–	–	–	–	2016–17	2018–19	11
54	Universidad Complutense	2	68	33	35	–	–	–	1	–	2001–02	2002–03	4
55	Cáceres	2	71	33	38	–	–	–	–	–	2003–04	2004–05	8
56	Fundación Granada	2	63	31	32	–	–	–	–	–	2018–19	2018–19	8
57	Real Betis	1	34	30	4	1	–	–	–	–	2018–19	2018–19	1
58	Pineda de Mar	2	60	30	30	–	–	–	–	–	1996–97	1997–98	6
59	Galicia Ferrol	3	94	29	65	–	–	–	–	–	1998–99	2000–01	10
60	Ciudad de Algeciras	2	68	27	41	–	–	–	–	–	2003–04	2004–05	14
61	Askatuak	2	61	23	38	–	–	–	–	–	1996–97	1997–98	8
62	Calpe	2	71	20	51	–	–	–	–	–	2004–05	2005–06	17
63	Cornellà	2	71	19	52	–	–	–	–	–	2001–02	2009–10	16
64	Fundación Lucentum	1	24	16	8	–	–	–	1	–	2019–20	2019–20	4
65	Real Canoe	2	58	16	42	–	–	–	–	–	2018–19	2018–19	15
66	Vic	1	34	15	19	–	–	–	–	–	2008–09	2008–09	12
67	Valls	1	34	13	21	–	–	–	–	–	2004–05	2004–05	15
68	Iraurgi	1	34	12	22	–	–	–	–	–	2017–18	2017–18	17
69	Aracena	1	34	12	22	–	–	–	–	–	2003–04	2003–04	18
70	Marín Peixegalego	2	58	12	46	–	–	–	–	–	2016–17	2019–20	18
71	Almansa	1	24	10	14	–	–	–	–	–	2019–20	2019–20	12
72	Fundación Adepal	1	37	10	27	–	–	–	–	–	2010–11	2010–11	17
73	Patronato Bilbao	1	29	9	20	–	–	–	–	–	1996–97	1996–97	11
74	Illescas	1	34	8	26	–	–	–	–	–	2008–09	2008–09	17
75	Ciudad de Vigo	1	34	6	28	–	–	–	–	–	2009–10	2009–10	18

League or status at 2019–20 season:

2019–20 ACB season
2019–20 LEB Oro season
2019–20 LEB Plata season
2019–20 Liga EBA season
Lower divisions
Clubs that no longer exist or does not compete in senior competitions

== The second division before LEB Oro ==
Before 1996, teams promoted to Liga ACB from other second division leagues. The number of teams promoted varies each year.

Segunda División
Season	Champion	Runner-up
1956–57	RCD Español	CE Laietà
1957–58	CD Iberia	Club Águilas Bilbao
1958–59	CB Fiesta Alegre	CN Helios Zaragoza
1959–60	Club Águilas Bilbao	CB Mollet
1960–61	Picadero JC	Club Agromán
1961–62	CE Laietà	UE Montgat
1962–63	CE Mataró	Sevilla FC
1963–64	CB Sant Josep Badalona	UER Pineda de Mar
1964–65	FC Barcelona	Sevilla FC
1965–66	SD Kas Vitoria	RC Náutico Tenerife
1966–67	Atlético San Sebastián	Real Canoe NC
1967–68	CB Sant Josep Badalona	CD Manresa
1968–69	RCD Espanyol	Club Águilas Bilbao
1969–70	UER Pineda de Mar	Bàsquet Manresa
1970–71	Club Vallehermoso OJE	UER Pineda de Mar
1971–72	Saski Baskonia	CE Mataró
1972–73	Círcol Catòlic de Badalona	Club YMCA España
1973–74	CB L'Hospitalet	Club Águilas Bilbao
1974–75	CB Breogán	Granollers EB
1975–76	Askatuak SBT	ADC Castilla Valladolid
1976–77	UE Mataró	Granollers EB
1977–78	CE Mollet	CB Tempus

Primera División B
Season	Champion	Runner-up
1978–79	CB Valladolid	CN Helios Zaragoza
1979–80	RC Náutico Tenerife	CB OAR Ferrol
1980–81	CB Caja de Ronda	CD La Salle Josepets
1981–82	CB Inmobanco	Saski Baskonia
1982–83	Cajamadrid	CB Canarias
1983–84	RCD Español	CB Breogán
1984–85	CB Peñas Huesca	CB Gran Canaria
1985–86	CB Canarias	Cajabilbao
1986–87	CB Caja de Ronda	CB Collado Villalba
1987–88	CB OAR Ferrol	Askatuak SBT
Primera División
1988–89	Club Ourense Baloncesto	CB Sevilla
1989–90	CB Murcia	Baloncesto León
1990–91	CB Gran Canaria	CB Llíria
1991–92	BC Andorra	Cáceres CB
1992–93	CB Cornellà	CB Guadalajara
1993–94	Cajabilbao	CB Salamanca
Liga EBA
1994–95	CB Gran Canaria	Gijón Baloncesto
1995–96	CB Granada	Valencia BC

== Segunda FEB ==
The Segunda FEB, formerly known as LEB 2 and LEB Plata, is the Spanish basketball third league since 2001, the second division of the leagues organized by the Spanish Basketball Federation. The best teams promotes to Primera FEB and the last qualified ones are relegated to Tercera FEB.

== LEB Bronce ==
In 2007, the Spanish Basketball Federation decided to create a third LEB with 18 teams, like the other two. Since that day, renamed LEB as LEB Oro (LEB Gold) and LEB-2 as LEB Plata (LEB Silver). This new league was called LEB Bronce, three first teams were promoted each year to LEB Plata and the four last teams were relegated to Liga EBA.

LEB Bronce had also its Cup, like the other LEBs. In 2009, after two seasons, LEB Bronce was removed due to the difficulties of the teams that enjoyed the new league.

Season	Champion	Runner-up	Third
2007–08	Gestibérica Vigo	Canasta Unibasket Jerez	Leyma Básquet Coruña
2008–09	Alerta Cantabria	Matchmind Carrefour El Bulevar de Ávila	CD Huelva Baloncesto

=== Copa LEB Bronce ===
Year	Host	Champion	Runner-up	Score
2008	Vigo	Balneario de Archena	Ciudad Torrealta Molina	91–70
2009	Tíjola	Alerta Cantabria	Promobys Valle del Almanzora	83–73
