= Jaime Peterson =

Dominican basketball player

Personal information
- Born: September 29, 1971 (age 55) New York City, New York, U.S.
- Listed height: 2.06 m (6 ft 9 in)
- Listed weight: 106 kg (234 lb)

Career information
- High school: Louis D. Brandeis (New York City, New York); Glen Mills (Glen Mills, Pennsylvania); Maine Central Institute (Pittsfield, Maine)
- College: Champlain College (1991–1993); Pittsburgh (1993–1995)
- NBA draft: 1995: undrafted
- Playing career: 1995–2009
- Position: Power forward / center

Career history
- 1995–1996: BCM Gravelines
- 1997: Panteras de Miranda
- 1997–1998: JL Bourg-en-Bresse
- 1998: Obras Sanitarias
- 1999: San Carlos
- 1999: Atléticos de San Germán
- 1999: Mauricio Báez
- 2000: Connecticut Pride
- 2000: Mauricio Báez
- 2000: San Carlos
- 2000–2001: Brest
- 2001: Plasencia
- 2001: Mauricio Báez
- 2001: Regatas San Nicolás
- 2001: Goes
- 2001–2002: Guadalajara
- 2002: CB Naco
- 2002–2003: Universidad Complutense
- 2003–2004: Virtus Ragusa
- 2004–2005: STB Le Havre
- 2005–2006: Rouen
- 2006: Marineros de Puerto Plata
- 2006–2007: León
- 2007–2008: Gandía
- 2008–2009: León

Career highlights
- Liga Española de Baloncesto MVP (2003); Second-team All-Big East (1995)
Medals
Men's basketball
Representing Dominican Republic
Centrobasket
Silver medal – second place	2003 Culiacán
Bronze medal – third place	1999 Havana
Silver medal – second place	1995 Santo Domingo

Jaime Peterson (born September 29, 1971) is a Dominican-American former professional basketball player. A 2.06 m (6 ft 9 in) forward-center, he was born in New York City to Dominican parents. After playing for three different high schools, including a postgraduate year at Maine Central Institute, Peterson played two seasons in the junior college circuit with Champlain College in Vermont before playing in the NCAA Division I with the Pittsburgh Panthers. He went undrafted in the 1995 NBA draft, and he started his professional career in France. In 2003 he was named the Most Valuable Player of the Liga Española de Baloncesto, the second tier of Spanish basketball. He played for the Dominican Republic national team from 1995 to 2005, and he won the silver medal at the 1995 and 2003 editions of Centrobasket.

== High school career ==
Peterson was born in New York City to Luz and Jaime Sr., who had immigrated from the Dominican Republic. Peterson has five siblings, one brother and four sisters. At the age of 14, Peterson moved out of the family home and went to live with a friend, José Marte. He initially played baseball, but due to his height he turned to basketball at the age of 15. He played basketball at Louis D. Brandeis High School in Manhattan and later moved to Glen Mills Schools in Glen Mills, Pennsylvania. He then enrolled at Maine Central Institute in Pittsfield, Maine where he was part of a team with several other NCAA Division I prospects playing for coach Max Good. He played two seasons at Maine Central Institute, including a postgraduate year, with the team posting a 52–11 overall record over Peterson's stint there.

== College career ==
Peterson played his first two seasons of college eligibility at Champlain College in Burlington, Vermont. In his freshman year he was a second-team All-State selection by the Vermont College Men's Basketball Coaches Association after averaging 16.3 points per game. In November 1992, Peterson signed a National Letter of Intent to play for Pittsburgh from the 1993–94 season. He spent the 1992–93 season at Champlain, averaging 16.2 points and 12.5 rebounds per game.

Peterson arrived at Pittsburgh in late 1993. He played his first season as a reserve, starting 1 game out of 26, playing 332 total minutes (12.8 per game) under coach Paul Evans. He averaged 4.9 points, 3.5 rebounds and 0.7 blocks per game, ranking second on the team in blocks behind Eric Mobley.

Peterson showed significant improvement in his senior season. He was promoted in the starting lineup by newly appointed head coach Ralph Willard, and he started all 28 games of the season, playing 36.4 minutes per game (1,020 total). On December 19, 1994, he recorded a career-high 6 blocks against Duquesne; on January 11, 1995, he tied the mark with 6 blocks against UConn. On January 23, 1995, he was named Big East Player of the Week. On January 28, 1995, he had 21 points, 16 rebounds and 5 steals against Georgetown. At the end of the season, Peterson was the team leader in points (13.9), rebounds (9.4), steals (1.8) and blocks (2.5). His 70 blocks for the season were the 6th best single-season mark in Pittsburgh history, and still stand as such as of 2019. He also ranked second in the Big East in rebounding, after having led the conference for a part of the season. He was named in the NABC All-Region First Team, and in the All-Big East Second Team. He also took part in the NABC All-Star Game at the end of the season.

== Professional career ==
After the end of his senior season, Peterson was automatically eligible for the 1995 NBA draft. He participated in the 1995 Portsmouth Invitational Tournament with the Portsmouth Sports Club team. He went undrafted in the NBA draft and started his professional career with BCM Gravelines in France. He played 30 games in the LNB Pro A, the first level of French basketball, and averaged 13.6 points, 8.1 rebounds and 1.3 assists in 32 minutes of playing time. In the 1996–97 preseason, Peterson was signed by the Dallas Mavericks of the NBA, but was released on October 22, 1996, before the start of the NBA season. Peterson then joined Panteras de Miranda of the Venezuelan Liga Profesional de Baloncesto in 1997. He spent the 1997–98 season with JL Bourg-en-Bresse in the LNB Pro B, the second tier of French basketball. In 1998 he briefly played for Obras Sanitarias in the Liga Nacional de Básquet of Argentina.

In 1999 he played for San Carlos, Atléticos de San Germán in Puerto Rico (1 game in the Baloncesto Superior Nacional where he scored 9 points) and Mauricio Báez, a club that participated in the Baloncesto Superior del Distrito Nacional, the basketball league for clubs of the Distrito Nacional in the Dominican Republic. In 2000 he played for the Connecticut Pride in the Continental Basketball Association (CBA), averaging 3 points, 4 rebounds and 0.6 blocks over 15 regular season games; he also played 1 playoff game, scoring 4 points and adding 4 rebounds and 4 blocks in 23 minutes. He then played for Mauricio Báez and San Carlos before signing for Étendard de Brest, another French club that participated in the Pro B.

In 2001 he played his first stint in Spain, and played for CB Plasencia in the 2000–01 LEB 2 season, the third level of Spanish basketball: he played 26 games, averaging 14.5 points and 10.8 rebounds per game. He then played for Mauricio Báez in the Dominican Republic, Regatas San Nicolás in Argentina, and Club Atlético Goes in Uruguay before signing with CB Guadalajara in Spain. In his second season in Spain he averaged 16.2 points and 9.2 rebounds in 29 LEB 2 regular season games, and 17.3 points and 9.7 rebounds in 3 postseason games. He played the 2002–03 season with CD Universidad Complutense of Madrid, and at the end of the season he was named regular season MVP of the Liga Española de Baloncesto after averaging 15.6 points, 10.9 rebounds and 0.5 assists in 30 games with a PIR of 22.5. He also appeared in 5 playoff games with averages of 10.6 points and 9.2 rebounds.

In July 2003 he moved to Italy and signed for Virtus Ragusa (at the time known as Banca Popolare Ragusa for sponsorships reasons), a Sicilian team in the LegaDue, the second tier of Italian basketball. He played 24 games (all starts) and averaged 11.5 points and 8.7 rebounds per game in 30.1 minutes of averaging playing time. He then spent the 2004–05 season with STB Le Havre in the French Pro A, and averaged 10 points an 5.9 rebounds in 31 appearances; the then transferred to Rouen Métropole Basket, another Pro A team, where he played 20 games of the 2005–06 season, averaging 10.7 points and 7.2 rebounds per game in 25.3 minutes.

In 2006 he played in the LIDOBA in the Dominican Republic with Marineros de Puerto Plata. He then went back to Spain and signed for Baloncesto León, playing 34 regular season games with averages of 7.4 points and 5.5 rebounds; he also played 11 playoff games, averaging 6.7 points and 4.3 rebounds. In the following season, Peterson signed for Gandía BA in Valencia, and played 30 games (9.3 points, 4.7 rebounds); he retired after playing the 2008–09 season with León.

== National team career ==
Peterson debuted with the Dominican Republic men's national basketball team in 1995, participating in the 1995 Centrobasket in Santo Domingo, where the Dominican Republic placed 2nd. He was then called up again in 1999: in May he participated in the 1999 Centrobasket, where he scored 11 points in the 3rd place game against Panama that earned him and his team the bronze medal. Later that year he took part in the 1999 Tournament of the Americas in July, and in the 1999 Pan American Games in Winnipeg, Manitoba, Canada in the month of August.

In 2001 he took part in the 2001 Centrobasket played in Toluca, Mexico. In 2003 he was part of the team that won the silver medal at the 2003 Centrobasket played in Culiacán, Mexico, during which he averaged 2.8 points, 4.2 rebounds and 2.2 assists per game. He was later included in the Dominican team that took part in the 2003 Tournament of the Americas, an event where Peterson posted averages of 5.1 points, 5.7 rebounds and 1.9 assists per game.

In 2005 he participated in the 2005 FIBA Americas Championship, receiving limited playing time and averaging 1.8 points and 1.5 rebounds per game.

== Career statistics ==
=== College ===
Year	Team	GP	GS	MPG	FG%	3P%	FT%	RPG	APG	SPG	BPG	PPG
1993–94	Pittsburgh	26	1	12.8	.535	—	.586	3.5	0.5	0.3	0.7	4.9
1994–95	Pittsburgh	28	28	36.4	.513	—	.755	9.4	0.8	1.8	2.5	13.9
Career		54	29	24.6	.518	—	.680	6.6	0.7	1.1	1.6	9.6
