= Curro Segura =

Greek professional basketball head coach

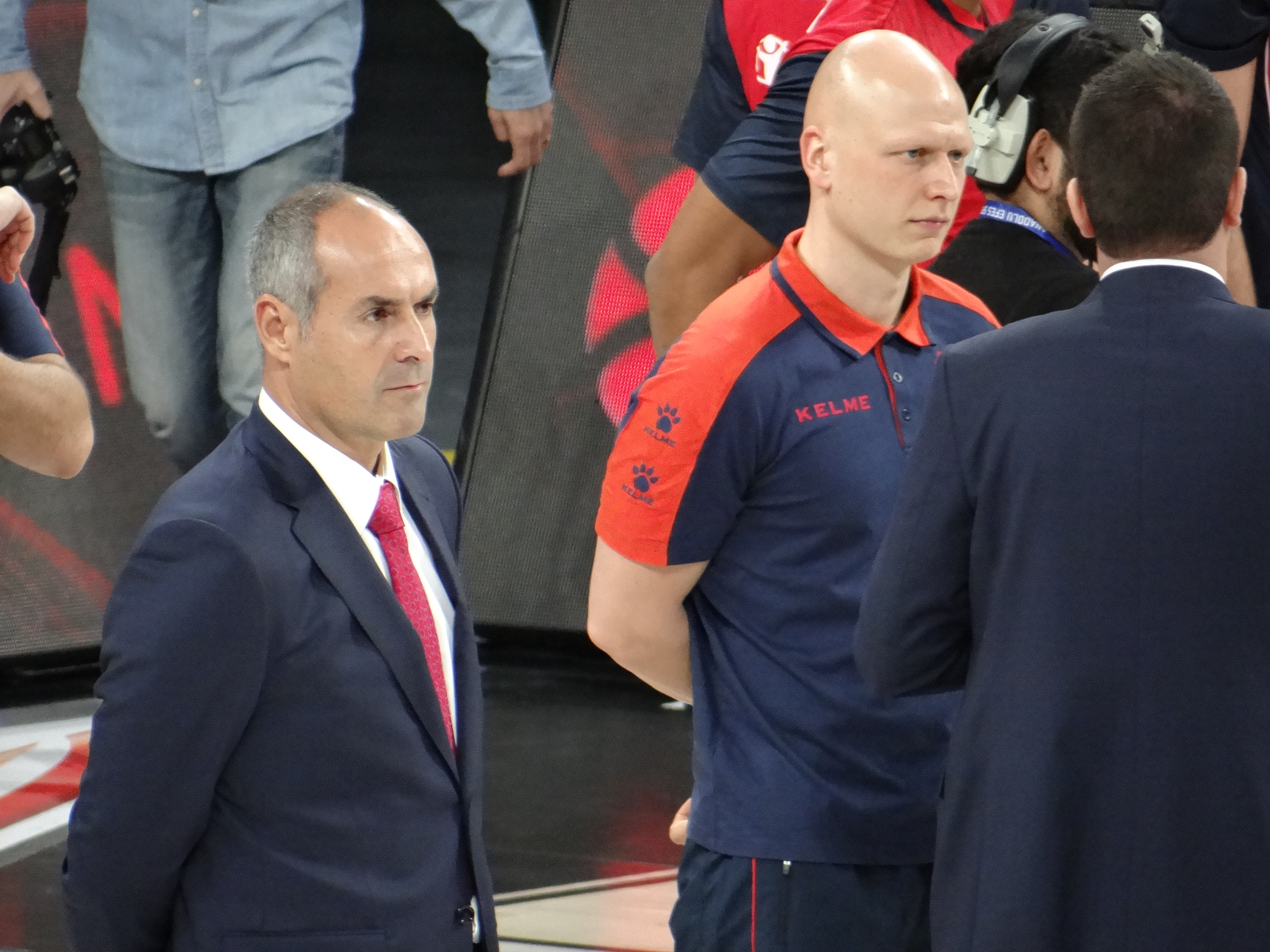
- Segura with Baskonia

Personal information
- Born: April 7, 1972 (age 54) Granada, Spain
- Position: Head coach
- Coaching career: 1994–present

Career history

Coaching
- 1994–1996: C.B. Oximeca Albolote (assistant)
- 1996–1997: C.B. Motril Costa Tropical
- 1997–1998: Coviran Granada (assistant)
- 1998–1999: CB Granada
- 1999–2001: C.B. Linense
- 2001–2002: Tenerife CB
- 2002–2006: Menorca Bàsquet
- 2007–2009: CAI Zaragoza
- 2009–2010: Obradoiro CAB
- 2010–2011: CB Granada
- 2012–2013: Unicaja Málaga (assistant)
- 2014: Kuwait
- 2014–2015: Jilin Northeast Tigers
- 2015: Club Atlético Aguada
- 2016: Gigantes de Guayana
- 2017–2018: Baskonia (assistant)
- 2018–2020: Real Betis
- 2021–2022: Ionikos Nikaias
- 2022: AEK Athens
- 2022–2023: Hereda San Pablo Burgos
- 2023–2024: Kolossos Rodou
- 2025–: Venezuela

Career highlights
- LEB Oro winner (2008, 2019); Copa Princesa de Asturias winner (2019)

Francisco Segura Gómez (born April 7, 1972) is a Spanish professional basketball coach, most recently for Kolossos Rodou of the Greek Basket League.

== Club career ==
=== Ionikos Nikaias ===
In August 2021, Curro Segura signed a contract with Greek Basket League club Ionikos Nikaias.

=== AEK Athens ===
In March 2022, Segura moved to fellow Greek Basket League club AEK Athens for the rest of the season. On July 4 of the same year, Segura parted ways with AEK.

=== Kolossos Rodou ===
On June 23, 2023, Segura returned to Greece once more, signing a two-year contract with Kolossos Rodou.

== Titles and achievements ==
- 2004–2005 : Liga Española de Baloncesto and Copa Princesa de Asturias runner-up.
- 2007–2008 : Liga Española de Baloncesto.
- 2008 : Supercopa de España de Baloncesto runner-up.
- 2018–2019: Liga Española de Baloncesto.
- 2019: Copa Princesa de Asturias.
