= 1996–97 LEB season =

Spanish basketball league season

The 1996–1997 LEB season was the inaugural season of the Liga Española de Baloncesto, the new second tier of the Spanish basketball.

== LEB table ==
Pos	Team	Pld	W	L	PF	PA	PD	Pts	Promotion, qualification or relegation
1	Gijón Baloncesto	26	18	8	2153	2027	+126	44	Qualification to quarterfinals
2	CajaCantabria	26	18	8	2319	2136	+183	44	Qualification to quarterfinals
3	Breogán	26	17	9	2238	2196	+42	43	Qualification to quarterfinals
4	Ciudad de Huelva	26	16	10	2149	2086	+63	42	Qualification to quarterfinals
5	Viajes Aliguer	26	16	10	2346	2202	+144	42	Qualification to round of 16
6	Melilla V Centenario	26	16	10	2309	2180	+129	42	Qualification to round of 16
7	Lucentum Alicante	26	15	11	1941	1884	+57	41	Qualification to round of 16
8	Andorra	26	13	13	2061	2016	+45	39	Qualification to round of 16
9	Cajasur Córdoba	26	11	15	2149	2198	−49	37	Qualification to round of 16
10	Gráficas García Inca	26	10	16	2159	2230	−71	36	Qualification to round of 16
11	Bilbao Patronato	26	9	17	1989	2191	−202	35	Qualification to round of 16
12	Peñas Huesca	26	8	18	2060	2174	−114	34	Qualification to round of 16
13	Askatuak	26	8	18	1872	2135	−263	34	Relegation playoffs
14	Tenerife Canarias	26	7	19	2182	2272	−90	33	Relegation playoffs

Source: LEB Oro

== LEB Playoffs ==
The two winners of the semifinals are promoted to Liga ACB.

Round of 16
8	BC Andorra	3
9	Cajasur Córdoba	1
5	Viajes Aliguer	3
12	CB Peñas Huesca	0
7	CB Lucentum Alicante	3
10	Gráficas García Inca	2
6	Melilla V Centenario	3
11	Bilbao Patronato	0

Quarterfinals
1	Gijón Baloncesto	2
8	BC Andorra	3
4	CB Ciudad de Huelva	3
5	Viajes Aliguer	0
2	Caja Cantabria	3
7	CB Lucentum Alicante	1
3	CB Breogán	3
6	Melilla V Centenario	1

Semifinals
4	CB Ciudad de Huelva	3
8	BC Andorra	2
2	CajaCantabria	3
3	CB Breogán	2

Finals
2	CajaCantabria	1
4	CB Ciudad de Huelva	2

== Relegation playoffs ==
Finals
13	Askatuak	1
14	Tenerife Canarias	3

=== Relegation system ===
There were not directly relegations of the last qualified teams in the league. If a team is the last qualified during two consecutive years or is between the two last teams during three seasons, losses its berth.

== See also ==
- Liga Española de Baloncesto
- 1995–96 Liga EBA season
