= 1998–99 LEB season =

Spanish basketball league season

The 1998–1999 LEB season was the third season of the Liga Española de Baloncesto, second tier of the Spanish basketball.

== LEB standings ==
| # | Teams | P | W | L | PF | PA | Qualification or relegation |
|---|---|---|---|---|---|---|---|
| 1 | Badajoz Caja Rural | 26 | 20 | 6 | 2023 | 1871 | Qualified to Quarterfinals |
| 2 | Caja Rural Melilla | 26 | 18 | 8 | 2082 | 1887 | Qualified to Quarterfinals |
| 3 | Breogán Universidade | 26 | 18 | 8 | 2095 | 1965 | Qualified to Quarterfinals |
| 4 | Tenerife Canarias | 26 | 17 | 9 | 1967 | 1896 | Qualified to Quarterfinals |
| 5 | Cabitel Gijón | 26 | 17 | 9 | 2096 | 2010 | Qualified to Round of 16 |
| 6 | Club Ourense Baloncesto | 26 | 14 | 12 | 2021 | 1919 | Qualified to Round of 16 |
| 7 | CB Los Barrios | 26 | 13 | 13 | 2198 | 2161 | Qualified to Round of 16 |
| 8 | Menorca Bàsquet | 26 | 13 | 13 | 1894 | 1871 | Qualified to Round of 16 |
| 9 | CB Ciudad de Huelva | 26 | 12 | 14 | 2052 | 2084 | Qualified to Round of 16 |
| 10 | Abeconsa Ferrol | 26 | 11 | 15 | 2000 | 2108 | Qualified to Round of 16 |
| 11 | CB Lucentum Alicante | 26 | 10 | 16 | 2093 | 2188 | Qualified to Round of 16 |
| 12 | Cajasur Córdoba | 26 | 7 | 19 | 1857 | 1971 | Qualified to Round of 16 |
| 13 | Sondeos del Norte | 26 | 7 | 19 | 1861 | 2076 | Relegation playoffs |
| 14 | Ciutat d'Inca | 26 | 5 | 21 | 1854 | 2086 | Relegation playoffs |

== LEB Playoffs ==
The two winners of the semifinals are promoted to Liga ACB.

Round of 16
8 | Menorca Bàsquet | 3
9 | CB Ciudad de Huelva | 0
5 | Cabitel Gijón | 3
12 | Cajasur | 1
7 | CB Los Barrios | 3
10 | Abeconsa Ferrol | 2
6 | Ourense Baloncesto | 3
11 | CB Lucentum Alicante | 2

Quarterfinals
1 | Badajoz Caja Rural | 1
8 | Menorca Bàsquet | 3
4 | Tenerife Canarias | 1
5 | Cabitel Gijón | 3
3 | Breogán Universidade | 3
6 | Ourense Baloncesto | 1
2 | Caja Rural Melilla | 3
7 | CB Los Barrios | 1

Semifinals
5 | Cabitel Gijón | 3
8 | Menorca Bàsquet | 0
2 | Caja Rural Melilla | 1
3 | Breogán Universidade | 3

Finals
3 | Breogán Universidade | 104+102
5 | Cabitel Gijón | 97+95

== Relegation playoffs ==
| Finals |
| 13 | Sondeos del Norte | 3 |
| 14 | Ciutat d'Inca | 1 |

=== Relegation system ===
There were not directly relegations of the last qualified teams in the league. If a team is between the two last teams during three seasons, losses its berth.

== See also ==
- Liga Española de Baloncesto
