= Antwain Barbour =

American basketball player

Personal information
- Born: June 17, 1982 (age 44) Elizabethtown, Kentucky. U.S.
- Listed height: 6 ft 5 in (1.96 m)
- Listed weight: 195 lb (88 kg)

Career information
- High school: Elizabethtown (Elizabethtown, Kentucky)
- College: Wabash Valley CC (2000–2002); Kentucky (2002–2004)
- NBA draft: 2004: undrafted
- Playing career: 2004–2016
- Position: Shooting guard

Career history
- 2004: Kentucky Reach
- 2004–2005: Kentucky Colonels
- 2005: Guaros de Lara
- 2005–2006: Yakama Sun Kings
- 2006: UB La Palma
- 2006–2008: Tenerife Baloncesto
- 2009: Erdemirspor
- 2009–2010: Lagun Aro GBC
- 2010–2011: Erdemirspor
- 2011–2012: Cibona Zagreb
- 2012–2013: Scavolini Siviglia Pesaro
- 2013–2014: Mersin BB
- 2014: King Wilki Morskie
- 2014–2015: Mersin BB
- 2015–2016: Hoops Club

Career highlights
- CBA champion (2006); CBA All-Star Game (2006); ABA All Star-Game (2005)
Medals
Men's basketball
Representing United States
Summer Universiade
Bronze medal – third place	2001 Beijing	Team competition

Antwain La'Mar Barbour (born June 27, 1982) is an American former professional basketball player who last played for Hoops Club of the Lebanese Basketball League.

Kentucky High School Sweet 16 State Champion 2000 (Elizabethtown).

MVP Kentucky High School State Tournament 2000.

== Career ==
After playing for Kentucky Wildcats at NCAA, Barbour joined Kentucky Colonels of ABA league in 2004.

Next season he played in the Continental Basketball Association with Yakima Sun Kings and on 2006 he arrives to Spain for finishing the 2005–06 LEB season with UB La Palma. He only played four games, but it was sufficient for signing for Tenerife Rural.

On the team of the island of Tenerife, Barbour played during two seasons and a half becoming one of the most spectacular players of the LEB League. He has got the scoring record at this league, with 50 points against CB Lucentum Alicante.

After two seasons reaching the promotion playoffs to Liga ACB and a half of another one, he leaves Tenerife for signing for Erdemir SK of the Turkish Basketball League. In this first season in Turkey, he becomes runner-up of the Turkish Cup Basketball and finishes the 2008–09 season saving the spot in the TBL. When he arrived, the team was in the 15th position.

On 2009, he returns to Spain to play at Lagun Aro GBC, team of the Liga ACB, the top Spanish basketball league. One year later, Barbour comes back to Zonguldak for playing again at Erdemir SK.

For the 2011–12 season, Antwain Barbour signed with KK Cibona.

On July 3, 2013, Barbour signed with Mersin BB. After a stint in Poland he came back with Mersin BB on December 10, 2014.
