= 1997–98 LEB season =

Spanish basketball league season

The 1997–1998 LEB season was the second season of the Liga Española de Baloncesto, second tier of the Spanish basketball.

== LEB standings ==
#	Teams	P	W	L	PF	PA	Qualification or relegation
1	Murcia Artel	24	18	6	1979	1774	Qualified to quarterfinals
2	Baloncesto Fuenlabrada	24	17	7	2017	1912	Qualified to quarterfinals
3	Breogán Universidade	24	15	9	1957	1827	Qualified to quarterfinals
4	Cajasur Córdoba	24	13	11	1842	1899	Qualified to quarterfinals
5	Gijón Baloncesto	24	12	12	1962	2026	Qualified to Round of 16
6	Menorca Bàsquet	24	11	13	1853	1875	Qualified to Round of 16
7	CB Lucentum Alicante	24	11	13	1824	1862	Qualified to Round of 16
8	Askatuak	24	11	13	1822	1882	Qualified to Round of 16
9	Melilla Caja Rural	24	10	14	1866	1895	Qualified to Round of 16
10	CB Los Barrios	24	10	14	1820	1875	Qualified to Round of 16
11	Viajes Aliguer	24	10	14	1919	1983	Qualified to Round of 16
12	Tenerife Canarias	24	9	15	1719	1814	Qualified to Round of 16
13	Gráficas García Inca	24	9	15	1876	1852	

== LEB Playoffs ==
The two winners of the semifinals are promoted to Liga ACB.

Round of 16
8	Askatuak	3
9	Melilla Caja Rural	1
5	Gijón Baloncesto	1
12	Tenerife Canarias	3
7	CB Lucentum Alicante	3
10	CB Los Barrios	1
6	Menorca Bàsquet	3
11	Viajes Aliguer	1

Quarterfinals
1	Murcia Artel	3
8	Askatuak	0
4	Cajasur Córdoba	0
12	Tenerife Canarias	3
3	Breogán Universidade	3
6	Menorca Bàsquet	0
2	Baloncesto Fuenlabrada	3
7	CB Lucentum Alicante	1

Semifinals
1	Murcia Artel	3
12	Tenerife Canarias	0
2	Baloncesto Fuenlabrada	3
3	Breogán Universidade	1

Finals
1	Murcia Artel	87+93
2	Baloncesto Fuenlabrada	81+87

=== Relegation system ===
There were not directly relegations of the last qualified teams in the league. If a team is the last qualified during two consecutive years or is between the two last teams during three seasons, losses its berth.

== See also ==
- Liga Española de Baloncesto
