= CB Inca =

Bàsquet Inca
- Leagues: Liga EBA
- Founded: 1987
- Dissolved: 2008
- Arena: Palau Municipal d'Esports d'Inca
- Location: Inca, Balearic Islands
- Team colors: Black and yellow
- President: Joan Llompart
- Vice-president(s): Willelmo Villar
- Website: www.basquetinca.com
Home	Away

Club Bàsquet Inca was a professional basketball team based in Inca, Balearic Islands.

Bàsquet Inca played during several seasons in the LEB Oro, Spanish second division, until it merged in 2008 with Bàsquet Muro in the new Bàsquet Mallorca.

== Season by season ==
Season	Tier	Division	Pos.	W–L	Cup competitions	
1995–96	2	Liga EBA	4th (Note: Joined the newly created LEB league.)	21–15		
1996–97	2	LEB	10th	12–19		
1997–98	2	LEB	13th	9–15	Copa Príncipe	RU
1998–99	2	LEB	14th	6–24		
1999–00	2	LEB	9th	17–18	Copa Príncipe	SF
2000–01	2	LEB	6th	19–16		
2001–02	2	LEB	12th	10–20		
2002–03	2	LEB	13th	15–19		
2003–04	2	LEB	17th	16–23		
2004–05	3	LEB 2	6th (Note: Bought the LEB berth of CB Valls Félix Hotel.)	21–12		
2005–06	2	LEB	5th	21–16	Copa Príncipe	RU
2006–07	2	LEB	7th	19–18		
2007–08	2	LEB Oro	16th	12–22		

== See also ==
- Bàsquet Mallorca
