= Ferrol CB =

Spanish basketball team

- Leagues: Liga EBA
- Founded: 2008
- History: CB Galicia (1995-2008); Ferrol CB (2008-present)
- Arena: A Malata
- Location: Ferrol, Galicia
- Team colors: Red and white
- President: José Rilo
- Head coach: Félix Ramos
- Website: ferrolcb.com
Home	Away

Ferrol CB is a Spanish basketball team, from Ferrol, in Galicia.

== History ==
Ferrol CB was founded in 2008 as a merger of two teams from the city:

- CB Galicia (former LEB team)
- CB San Rosendo

In July 2015 the club announced that would dissolve its senior team, playing only in youth leagues.

== Season by season ==
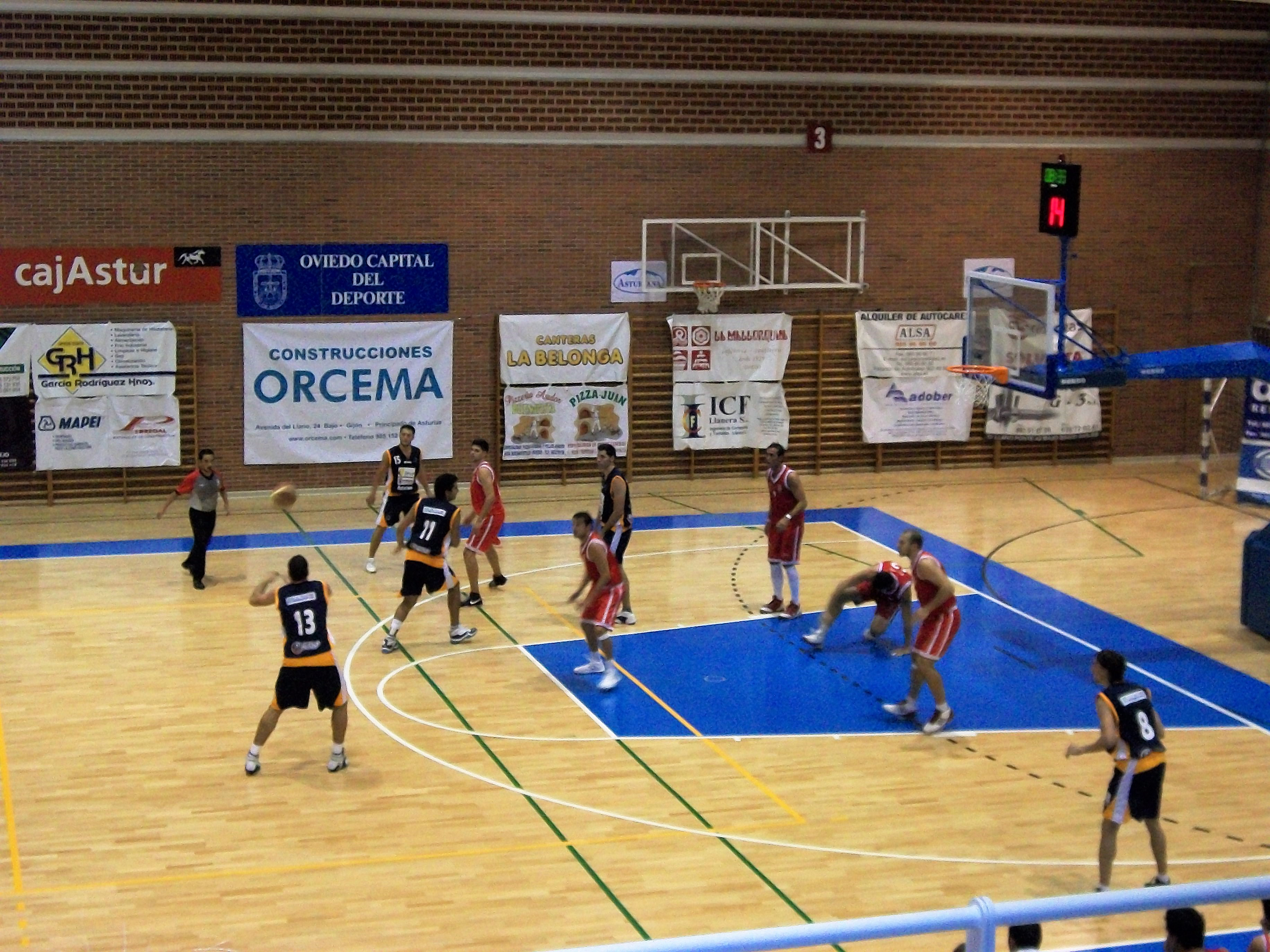
Match against Oviedo CB in the 2009–10 Liga EBA season.

=== CB San Rosendo ===
Season	Tier	Division	Pos.	W–L
2005–06	5	1ª División	6th	12–16
2006–07	5	1ª División	1st	24–7
2007–08	5	Liga EBA	16th	6–24

=== CB Galicia ===
Season	Tier	Division	Pos.	W–L	Cup competitions	
1995–96	2	Liga EBA	9th	15–15		
1996–97	3	Liga EBA				
1997–98	3	Liga EBA	3rd	26–10		
1998–99	2	LEB	10th	13–18		
1999–00	2	LEB	15th	7–23		
2000–01	2	LEB	15th	9–24		
2001–02	3	LEB 2	16th (Note: Achieved one of the vacant berths.)	8–27		
2002–03	3	LEB 2	4th	24–12	Copa LEB Plata	SF
2003–04	3	LEB 2	6th (Note: Resigned to its berth in LEB 2.)	16–14		
2004–05	4	Liga EBA	13th	11–19		
2005–06	4	Liga EBA	9th	14–16		
2006–07	4	Liga EBA	5th	14–12		
2007–08	5	Liga EBA	12th	12–18		

=== Ferrol CB ===
Season	Tier	Division	Pos.	W–L
2008–09	5	Liga EBA	3rd	17–14
2009–10	4	Liga EBA	3rd	20–12
2010–11	4	Liga EBA	4th	20–2
2011–12	4	Liga EBA	5th	14–8
2012–13	4	Liga EBA	7th	14–6
2013–14	4	Liga EBA	18th	7–15
2014–15	4	Liga EBA	12th	8–18

== Trophies and awards ==
=== Individual awards ===
LEB Oro MVP

- Eric Cuthrell – 1999

LEB Plata MVP

- Melvin Simon – 2002
