= 2007–08 LEB Oro season =

2007-08 LEB season
- League: Liga Española de Baloncesto
- Sport: Basketball
- Duration: September 21, 2007-May 16, 2008
- TV partner: Popular TV

Regular season
- Season champions: CAI Zaragoza
- Season MVP: (United States) Andrew Panko (Bruesa)
- Top scorer: (United States) Antwain Barbour (Tenerife)

Playoffs

Finals
- Champions: Bruesa
- Runners-up: Tenerife
- Finals MVP: (Lithuania) Martynas Andriuskevicius (Alicante)

The 2007–08 LEB season is the 12th season of the Liga Española de Baloncesto. The 612-game regular season (34 games for each of the 18 teams) began on Friday, September 21, 2007, and will end on Friday, May 16, 2008. The champion of the regular season will be promoted to ACB. The teams between 2nd and 9th position will play a best of 3 games play off between May 20 and May 27 to see who plays the Final Four in Cáceres, between May 31 and June 1. Two bottom teams will be relegated to LEB Plata.

== LEB Oro Regular season ==
| Pos. | Teams | Pld | W | L | PF | PA | Avg | Qualification or relegation |
|---|---|---|---|---|---|---|---|---|
| 1 | CAI Zaragoza | 34 | 28 | 6 | 2950 | 2465 | +485 | Promotion to Liga ACB |
| 2 | Alicante Costa Blanca | 34 | 24 | 10 | 2795 | 2648 | +147 | Promotion playoffs |
| 3 | Bruesa GBC | 34 | 24 | 10 | 2851 | 2684 | +167 | Promotion playoffs |
| 4 | Leche Río Breogán | 34 | 24 | 10 | 2739 | 2546 | +193 | Promotion playoffs |
| 5 | Tenerife Rural | 34 | 19 | 15 | 2809 | 2678 | +131 | Promotion playoffs |
| 6 | Plus Pujol Lleida | 34 | 19 | 15 | 2714 | 2655 | +59 | Promotion playoffs |
| 7 | Ciudad de La Laguna | 34 | 17 | 17 | 2696 | 2752 | -56 | Promotion playoffs |
| 8 | Beirasar Rosalía | 34 | 17 | 17 | 2636 | 2739 | -103 | Promotion playoffs |
| 9 | Villa de Los Barrios | 34 | 17 | 17 | 2505 | 2557 | -52 | Promotion playoffs |
| 10 | Melilla Baloncesto | 34 | 15 | 19 | 2524 | 2586 | -62 | |
| 11 | Ford Burgos | 34 | 15 | 19 | 2639 | 2661 | -22 | |
| 12 | Ciudad de Huelva ^{1} | 34 | 14 | 20 | 2576 | 2657 | -81 | |
| 13 | CB Alcúdia ^{2} | 34 | 13 | 21 | 2464 | 2596 | -132 | |
| 14 | Aguas de Valencia | 34 | 13 | 21 | 2599 | 2686 | -87 | |
| 15 | Alerta Cantabria ^{3} | 34 | 12 | 22 | 2567 | 2736 | -169 | |
| 16 | Basquetinca.com ^{4} | 34 | 12 | 22 | 2590 | 2679 | -89 | |
| 17 | La Palma ^{5} | 34 | 12 | 22 | 2626 | 2782 | -156 | Relegation to LEB Plata |
| 18 | L'Hospitalet | 34 | 11 | 23 | 2663 | 2836 | -173 | Relegation to LEB Plata |

^{1} Ciudad de Huelva relegated to LEB Bronce due economic problems.
^{2} CB Alcúdia disappeared.
^{3} Alerta Cantabria relegated to LEB Bronce due economic problems.
^{4} Basquetinca.com refounded with Bàsquet Muro under the name of Bàsquet Mallorca.
^{5} UB La Palma clinched a vacant LEB berth and was not relegated

== LEB Oro Playoffs ==
=== Quarterfinals ===
Each quarterfinal was a best-of-three (if third serie necessary) series between teams in the 2-9 positions, with the best-place team receiving home advantage. All opening games were played on May 20, 2008, and all second games were played on May 24. The deciding third games were played on May 27.

| Team #1 | Agg. | Team #2 | 1st leg | 2nd leg | 3rd leg^{*} |
|---|---|---|---|---|---|
| Alicante Costa Blanca | 2 - 1 | Villa de Los Barrios | 73 - 67 | 52 - 66 | 103 - 67 |
| Bruesa GBC | 2 - 0 | Beirasar Rosalía | 76 - 67 | 74 - 73 | – |
| Leche Río Breogán | 2 - 0 | Ciudad de La Laguna | 76 - 64 | 94 - 79 | – |
| Tenerife Rural | 2 - 1 | Plus Pujol Lleida | 86 - 89 | 92 - 81 | 91 - 85 |

* if necessary

=== Final Four ===
The Final Four is the last phase of the LEB Oro season, and is held over a weekend in Cáceres. The semifinal games are played on May 31. The championship final is played on June 1.

Semifinals
2 | Alicante Costa Blanca | 78
5 | Tenerife Rural | 79
3 | Bruesa GBC | 83
4 | Leche Río Breogán | 72

Finals
5 | Tenerife Rural | 76
3 | Bruesa GBC | 81

== Stats Leaders ==
=== Points ===
| Rank | Name | Team | Games | Points | PPG |
|---|---|---|---|---|---|
| 1. | (United States) Antwain Barbour | Tenerife Rural | 39 | 762 | 19.5 |
| 2. | (United States) Brad Oleson | Beirasar Rosalía | 32 | 570 | 17.8 |
| 3. | (United Kingdom) Darren Phillip | CAI Zaragoza | 34 | 600 | 17.6 |
| 4. | (Argentina) Paolo Quinteros | CAI Zaragoza | 34 | 595 | 17.5 |
| 5. | (United States) Andrew Panko | Bruesa GBC | 38 | 597 | 15.7 |

=== Rebounds ===
| Rank | Name | Team | Games | Points | PPG |
|---|---|---|---|---|---|
| 1. | (United States) Jakim Donaldson | Ciudad de La Laguna | 36 | 357 | 9.9 |
| 2. | (Spain) Oriol Junyent | Ciudad de Huelva | 21 | 204 | 9.7 |
| 3. | (Republic of the Congo) Serge Ibaka | L'Hospitalet | 28 | 234 | 8.4 |
| 4. | (Czech Republic) Ondrej Starosta | CAI Zaragoza | 34 | 259 | 7.6 |
| 5. | (United States) Andrew Panko | Bruesa GBC | 38 | 287 | 7.5 |

=== Assists ===
| Rank | Name | Team | Games | Points | PPG |
|---|---|---|---|---|---|
| 1. | (Argentina) Lucas Victoriano | CAI Zaragoza | 34 | 196 | 5.8 |
| 2. | (Spain) Jorge Jiménez | Aguas de Valencia | 33 | 154 | 4.7 |
| 3. | (Argentina) Diego Ciorciari | Melilla Baloncesto | 34 | 152 | 4.5 |
| 3. | (Spain) Xavier Puyada | CB Alcúdia | 34 | 152 | 4.5 |
| 5. | (France) Stéphane Dumas | Alicante Costa Blanca | 36 | 157 | 4.4 |
