= Bball Córdoba =

Basketball team in Spain

- Leagues: Liga EBA
- Founded: 2008
- History: Baloncesto Córdoba 2016 (2008–2012); Bball Córdoba (2012–present)
- Arena: Pabellón Vista Alegre
- Location: Córdoba, Spain
- Team colors: Navy and blue
- President: (Spain) Martín Torres
- Head coach: (Spain) Rafael Gomáriz
- Website: www.bballcordoba.com
Home	Away

Bball Córdoba was a Basketball team based in Córdoba, Andalusia. The team played its last season in league Liga EBA.

== History ==
Bball Córdoba was founded in 2008 with the name of Club Deportivo Baloncesto Córdoba 2016, as a merger of the two top teams in the city, when they were playing LEB Bronce:

- CB Juventud de Córdoba (former LEB Oro team)
- CB Ciudad de Córdoba

The team played in LEB Plata until it was relegated to Liga EBA in 2010. Later, in 2012, the club changed was renamed as Bball Córdoba, its last denomination.

In 2016, the team was not admitted in Liga EBA and subsequently registered in Primera División, one tier below. That was the end of the club's existence.

== Season by season ==
=== Juventud de Córdoba ===
Season	Tier	Division	Pos.	W–L	Cup competitions	
1986–87	2	1ª División B	24th	11–23		
1987–88	2	1ª División B	25th	13–25		
1992–93	2	1ª División	24th	16–20		
1993–94	2	1ª División	24th	16–14		
1994–95	2	Liga EBA	10th	10–20		
1995–96	2	Liga EBA	11th (Note: Joined the newly created LEB League.)			
1996–97	2	LEB	9th	12–18		
1997–98	2	LEB	5th	13–14	Copa Príncipe	QF
1998–99	2	LEB	12th	8–21		
1999–00	2	LEB	8th	19–19		
2000–01	2	LEB	8th	16–17		
2001–02	2	LEB	15th (Note: Resigned to its place in LEB 2.)	10–24		
2002–03	4	Liga EBA	1st	23–9		
2003–04	4	Liga EBA	5th	18–12		
2004–05	4	Liga EBA	9th	14–16		
2005–06	4	Liga EBA	5th	18–12		
2006–07	4	Liga EBA	14th (Note: Joined the newly created LEB Bronce.)	5–21		
2007–08	4	LEB Bronce	9th	16–18		

=== Ciudad de Córdoba ===
Season	Tier	Division	Pos.	Postseason
2005–06	5	1ª División	11th	16–10
2006–07	5	1ª División	15th (Note: Joined the newly created LEB Bronce.)	13–11
2007–08	4	LEB Bronce	10th	16–16

=== Bball Córdoba ===
Season	Tier	Division	Pos.	W–L
2008–09	3	LEB Plata	14th	10–20
2009–10	3	LEB Plata	21st	7–21
2010–11	4	Liga EBA	5th	13–11
2011–12	4	Liga EBA	6th (Note: Resigned to its place in Liga EBA.)	9–7
2012–13	5	1ª División	4th (Note: Achieved a vacant berth in Liga EBA.)	11–7
2013–14	4	Liga EBA	7th	10–12
2014–15	4	Liga EBA	4th	19–7
2015–16	4	Liga EBA	4th (Note: Was not admitted to play in Liga EBA the next season.)	14–13
