= CB Cornellà =

- Leagues: LEB Plata
- Founded: 1929
- Arena: Nou Parc Baix LLobregat
- Location: Cornellà de Llobregat, Catalonia, Spain
- Team colors: Blue
- President: Josep Rey
- Head coach: Jordi Martí
- Championships: 1 LEB Plata Championship; 1 Liga EBA Championship; 2 Copa EBA Championships
- Website: www.basquetcornella.com
Home	Away

Club Bàsquet Cornellà is a professional basketball team based in Cornellà de Llobregat, Catalonia. The team currently plays in LEB Plata.

Since the 1990s until 2010, CB Cornellà worked as farm team of FC Barcelona. After the 2009–10 season, the team was relegated to LEB Plata, but due to financial problems and to finish the agreement with FC Barcelona, CB Cornellà decided to join LEB Plata, the fourth tier.

== Season by season ==
Season	Tier	Division	Pos.	W–L	Cup competitions	
1992–93	2	1ª División	1st	40–8		
1993–94	2	1ª División	13th	12–18		
1994–95	2	Liga EBA	2nd	24–14		
1995–96	2	Liga EBA	1st	27–9		
1996–97	3	Liga EBA	2nd			
1997–98	3	Liga EBA	4th	18–12		
1998–99	3	Liga EBA	1st	22–9	Copa EBA	C
1999–00	3	Liga EBA	1st	25–4	Copa EBA	C
2000–01	3	LEB 2	1st	26–15	Copa LEB 2	RU
2001–02	2	LEB	16th	8–25		
2002–03	3	LEB 2	8th	17–18		
2003–04	3	LEB 2	9th	11–15		
2004–05	3	LEB 2	9th	14–16		
2005–06	3	LEB 2	3rd	23–14		
2006–07	3	LEB 2	11th	15–19		
2007–08	3	LEB Plata	15th	11–23		
2008–09	3	LEB Plata	2nd	23–12		
2009–10	2	LEB Oro	17th (Note: Resigned to its berth in LEB Plata.)	11–27		
2010–11	4	Liga EBA	3rd	18–14		
2011–12	4	Liga EBA	12th	12–16		
2012–13	4	Liga EBA	7th	16–14		
2013–14	4	Liga EBA	7th	9–11		
2014–15	4	Liga EBA	12th (Note: Remained in the league after an expansion of the group C.)	9–17		
2015–16	4	Liga EBA	10th	12–16		
2016–17	4	Liga EBA	7th	13–13		
2017–18	4	Liga EBA	7th	14–12		
2018–19	4	Liga EBA	9th	11–15		
2019–20	4	Liga EBA	7th (Note: Achieved a vacant place in LEB Plata.)	12–9		

== Trophies and awards ==
=== Trophies ===
- 2nd division championships: (1)
  - 1ª División B: (1) 1993
- 3rd division championships: (2)
  - Liga EBA: (1) 2000
  - LEB Plata: (1) 2001

== Current roster ==
Note: Flags indicate national team eligibility at FIBA-sanctioned events. Players may hold other non-FIBA nationalities not displayed.

CB Cornellà roster
Players
Coaches

Pos.	No.	Nat.	Name	Ht.	Age
PF	23	(Democratic Republic of the Congo)	Belemene, Cedric	2.00 m (6 ft 7 in)	29 – 23 July 1996
PF	34	(Spain)	Belver, Ignasi	1.97 m (6 ft 6 in)	31 – 8 December 1994
C	33	(Spain)	Galbete, Gerard	2.04 m (6 ft 8 in)	37 – 13 March 1988
PG	11	(Spain)	Guardia, Sergi	1.88 m (6 ft 2 in)	37 – 29 July 1988
PG	7	(Spain)	Hernández, Adrià	1.92 m (6 ft 4 in)	28 – 2 April 1997
PF	14	(United States)	Lopez, Joseph	2.01 m (6 ft 7 in)	30 – 6 December 1995
PF	20	(Spain)	Martos, Lluís	2.00 m (6 ft 7 in)	23 – 30 January 2002
SG	9	(Spain)	Mayo, Isaac	1.91 m (6 ft 3 in)	24 – 10 September 2001
C	35	(Nigeria)	Orizu, Prince	2.07 m (6 ft 9 in)	31 – 10 August 1994
PG	10	(Spain)	Rodríguez, Gerard	1.88 m (6 ft 2 in)	27 – 17 April 1998
SF	5	(Spain)	Signes, Manel	2.00 m (6 ft 7 in)	25 – 19 September 2000
C	32	(Spain)	Vicens, Antoni	2.03 m (6 ft 8 in)	35 – 27 March 1990

Head coach

- (Spain) Juan Couto

Legend

- (C) Team captain
- Injured
