= 1999–2000 LEB season =

Spanish basketball league season

The 1999–2000 LEB season was the 4th season of the Liga Española de Baloncesto, second tier of the Spanish basketball.

== LEB standings ==
#	Teams	P	W	L	PF	PA	Qualification or relegation
1	CB Lucentum Alicante	30	22	8	2430	2254	Qualified to Quarterfinals
2	Club Ourense Baloncesto	30	20	10	2359	2228	Qualified to Quarterfinals
3	Melilla Baloncesto	30	20	10	2354	2299	Qualified to Quarterfinals
4	Caprabo Lleida	30	19	11	2460	2344	Qualified to Quarterfinals
5	Tenerife Atún	30	19	11	2226	2097	Qualified to Round of 16
6	IBB Hoteles Menorca	30	18	12	2395	2267	Qualified to Round of 16
7	Polaris World Murcia	30	16	14	2421	2466	Qualified to Round of 16
8	Cajasur Córdoba	30	16	14	2442	2480	Qualified to Round of 16
9	Drac Inca	30	15	15	2183	2159	Qualified to Round of 16
10	CB Granada	30	14	16	2336	2352	Qualified to Round of 16
11	CB Los Barrios	30	14	16	2384	2450	Qualified to Round of 16
12	Badajoz Caja Rural	30	12	18	2201	2224	Qualified to Round of 16
13	Sondeos del Norte	30	12	18	2140	2262	
14	CB Ciudad de Huelva	30	9	21	2439	2562	
15	Abeconsa Ferrol	30	7	23	2352	2517	
16	Ulla Oil Rosalía	30	7	23	2273	2434	

There are no relegations to lower divisions.

== LEB Oro Playoffs ==
The two winners of the semifinals are promoted to Liga ACB.

Round of 16
8	Cajasur Córdoba	3
9	Drac Inca	2
5	Tenerife Atún	3
12	Badajoz Caja Rural	2
7	Polaris World Murcia	3
10	CB Granada	2
6	IBB Hoteles Menorca	3
11	CB Los Barrios	0

Quarterfinals
1	CB Lucentum Alicante	3
8	Cajasur Córdoba	0
4	Caprabo Lleida	3
5	Tenerife Atún	2
3	Melilla Baloncesto	0
6	IBB Hoteles Menorca	3
2	Ourense Baloncesto	3
7	Polaris World Murcia	1

Semifinals
1	CB Lucentum Alicante	3
4	CE Lleida Bàsquet	2
2	Ourense Baloncesto	3
6	IBB Hoteles Menorca	0

Finals
1	CB Lucentum Alicante	85+83
2	Ourense Baloncesto	83+72

== See also ==
- Liga Española de Baloncesto
