= 1994–95 Liga EBA season =

First season of the Liga EBA

The 1994–95 Liga EBA season was the first one of this competition, created to be the new second tier of Spanish basketball.

== Regular season ==
Key to colors
| Qualify to the Second Round |
| Qualify to Relegation Playoffs |

=== Group North ===
| # | Teams | P | W | L |
|---|---|---|---|---|
| 1 | Gijón Baloncesto | 26 | 21 | 5 |
| 2 | Vino de Toro | 26 | 20 | 6 |
| 3 | SD Patronato | 26 | 19 | 7 |
| 4 | CB Coruña | 26 | 16 | 10 |
| 5 | Cantabria Baloncesto | 26 | 16 | 10 |
| 6 | CB Ciudad de Pontevedra | 26 | 14 | 12 |
| 7 | SD Alsasua | 26 | 14 | 12 |
| 8 | Askatuak SBT | 26 | 13 | 13 |
| 9 | CB Espolón Burgos | 26 | 13 | 13 |
| 10 | Viña Costeira | 26 | 9 | 17 |
| 11 | Arrasate SB | 26 | 9 | 17 |
| 12 | Baloncesto León B | 26 | 9 | 17 |
| 13 | Baloncesto Ponferrada | 26 | 6 | 20 |
| 14 | CB Valladolid U23 | 26 | 3 | 23 |

=== Group East ===
| # | Teams | P | W | L |
|---|---|---|---|---|
| 1 | CB Tarragona | 26 | 18 | 8 |
| 2 | CB Cornellà | 26 | 17 | 9 |
| 3 | CB Llíria | 26 | 16 | 10 |
| 4 | CB Montcada | 26 | 16 | 10 |
| 5 | Gandía BA | 26 | 15 | 11 |
| 6 | CB Calpe | 26 | 15 | 11 |
| 7 | CB Mollet | 26 | 13 | 13 |
| 8 | CB Sant Josep Badalona | 26 | 13 | 13 |
| 9 | CB Archena | 26 | 12 | 14 |
| 10 | CB Sant Josep Girona B | 26 | 12 | 14 |
| 11 | Basket Zaragoza CD | 26 | 11 | 15 |
| 12 | Menorca Bàsquet | 26 | 9 | 17 |
| 13 | CB L'Horta | 26 | 9 | 17 |
| 14 | CB Almàssera | 26 | 6 | 20 |

=== Group Centre ===
| # | Teams | P | W | L |
|---|---|---|---|---|
| 1 | CB Albacete | 26 | 21 | 5 |
| 2 | Baloncesto Fuenlabrada | 26 | 20 | 6 |
| 3 | CB Guadalajara | 26 | 17 | 9 |
| 4 | CB Plasencia | 26 | 16 | 10 |
| 5 | CB Las Rozas | 26 | 16 | 10 |
| 6 | CP La Serena | 26 | 15 | 11 |
| 7 | Real Canoe NC | 26 | 14 | 12 |
| 8 | Juventud Alcalá | 26 | 12 | 14 |
| 9 | CB Estudiantes B | 26 | 12 | 14 |
| 10 | CB San Fernando | 26 | 12 | 14 |
| 11 | CABA Albacete | 26 | 11 | 15 |
| 12 | Bansander | 26 | 7 | 19 |
| 13 | CB Alcobendas | 26 | 7 | 19 |
| 14 | CB Azuqueca | 26 | 2 | 24 |

=== Group South ===
| # | Teams | P | W | L |
|---|---|---|---|---|
| 1 | CB Tenerife Canarias | 26 | 24 | 2 |
| 2 | CB Gran Canaria | 26 | 19 | 7 |
| 3 | CAB Granada | 26 | 18 | 8 |
| 4 | Ernesto Electrodomésticos | 26 | 17 | 9 |
| 5 | CB Motril | 26 | 15 | 13 |
| 6 | Club Melilla Baloncesto | 26 | 15 | 11 |
| 7 | Baloncesto Málaga B | 26 | 14 | 12 |
| 8 | CB Almería | 26 | 13 | 13 |
| 9 | CB Huelva 76 | 26 | 12 | 14 |
| 10 | CB Ciudad de Algeciras | 26 | 10 | 16 |
| 11 | CB Marbella | 26 | 9 | 17 |
| 12 | CB Juventud Córdoba | 26 | 7 | 19 |
| 13 | CB Fuste | 26 | 5 | 21 |
| 14 | CB Sevilla B | 26 | 4 | 22 |

== Relegation playoffs ==
The six last qualified teams in each group played the relegation playoffs. All groups played independently 9th vs 14th, 10th vs 13th and 11th vs 12th. The losers of a best-of-five serie were relegated to Segunda División.

| Team 1 | Score | Team 2 |
|---|---|---|
| CB Espolón Burgos | 3–2 | CB Valladolid B |
| CB Verín | 3–2 | Baloncesto Ponferrada |
| Arrasate SB | 3–1 | Baloncesto León B |
| CB Archena | 3–1 | CB Almàssera |
| CB Sant Josep Girona B | 3–1 | CB L'Horta |
| Basket Zaragoza CD | 1–3 | Menorca Bàsquet |
| CB Estudiantes B | 3–0 | CB Azuqueca |
| CB San Fernando | 1–3 | CB Alcobendas |
| CABA Albacete | 1–3 | Bansander |
| CB Huelva 76 | 3–0 | CB Sevilla |
| CB Ciudad de Algeciras | 1–3 | CB Fuste |
| CB Marbella | 1–3 | CB Juventud Córdoba |

== Second round ==
Key to colors
| Qualify to the Final Eight |

=== Group E ===
| # | Teams | P | W | L |
|---|---|---|---|---|
| 1 | CB Cornellà | 10 | 6 | 4 |
| 2 | Gijón Baloncesto | 10 | 6 | 4 |
| 3 | SD Patronato | 10 | 5 | 5 |
| 4 | Cantabria Baloncesto | 10 | 5 | 5 |
| 5 | CB Calpe | 10 | 5 | 5 |
| 6 | CB Montcada | 10 | 3 | 7 |

=== Group F ===
| # | Teams | P | W | L |
|---|---|---|---|---|
| 1 | CB Llíria | 10 | 7 | 3 |
| 2 | CB Coruña | 10 | 6 | 4 |
| 3 | CB Tarragona | 10 | 5 | 5 |
| 4 | Gandía BA | 10 | 4 | 6 |
| 5 | CB Ciudad de Pontevedra | 10 | 4 | 6 |
| 6 | Vino de Toro | 10 | 4 | 6 |

=== Group G ===
| # | Teams | P | W | L |
|---|---|---|---|---|
| 1 | CB Gran Canaria | 10 | 7 | 3 |
| 2 | Ernesto Electrodomésticos | 10 | 6 | 4 |
| 3 | CB Albacete | | | |
| 4 | CB Guadalajara | | | |
| 5 | CB Las Rozas | | | |
| 6 | Club Melilla Baloncesto | | | |

=== Group H ===
| # | Teams | P | W | L |
|---|---|---|---|---|
| 1 | CB Tenerife Canarias | | | |
| 2 | CB Plasencia | | | |
| 3 | Baloncesto Fuenlabrada | 10 | 6 | 4 |
| 4 | CAB Granada | 10 | 5 | 5 |
| 5 | CB Motril | | | |
| 6 | CP La Serena | | | |

== Final Eight ==
The Final Eight of the Liga EBA was held in Gijón. The two winners in the semifinals promoted to Liga ACB.

Quarterfinals
1E | CB Cornellà | 79
2H | CB Plasencia | 73
1F | CB Llíria | 69
2G | CB Gran Canaria | 76
1H | CB Tenerife Canarias | 72
2E | Gijón Baloncesto | 77
1G | Ernesto Electrodomésticos | 74
2F | CB Coruña | 72

Semifinals
1E | CB Cornellà | 68
2G | CB Gran Canaria | 85
2E | Gijón Baloncesto | 69
1G | Ernesto Electrodomésticos | 68

Final
2G | CB Gran Canaria | 86
2E | Gijón Baloncesto | 84

CB Gran Canaria and Gijón Baloncesto promoted to Liga ACB.

== See also ==
- 1993–94 Primera División de Baloncesto
