= CB Ciudad de Huelva =

Basketball team in Andalucia, Spain

Ciudad de Huelva
- Founded: 1996
- Dissolved: 2008
- Arena: Palacio de los Deportes de Huelva
- Location: Huelva, Andalucia
- Team colors: White
- President: Francisco Bayo
- Vice-president: Manuel Dávila
- Championships: 1 LEB Championship
- Website: www.cbhuelva.es
Home	Away

Club Baloncesto Ciudad de Huelva was a professional basketball team based in Huelva, Andalucia. The last season, (2007–08) the team played in LEB Oro.

== History ==
CB Ciudad de Huelva was founded in 1996. In their first season, they win the LEB League and they are promoted to the 1996-97 ACB League. They only play one year and they are relegated in they play-out.

Ciudad de Huelva continues playing in LEB until 2008, year where they disappear due to the enormous debts. The club was immediately replaced by the new creation CD Huelva Baloncesto.

== Season by season ==
Season	Tier	Division	Pos.	W–L	Other cups	
1996–97	2	LEB	1st	24–13	Copa Príncipe	3rd
1997–98	1	Liga ACB	17th	11–28		
1998–99	2	LEB	9th	12–17		
1999–00	2	LEB	14th	9–21		
2000–01	2	LEB	7th	17–17		
2001–02	2	LEB	6th	18–17		
2002–03	2	LEB	15th (Note: Remained in the league after achieving a vacant berth.)	13–22		
2003–04	2	LEB	8th	19–20		
2004–05	2	LEB	4th	27–16	Copa Príncipe	SF
2005–06	2	LEB	16th	16–21		
2006–07	2	LEB	4th	21–20		
2007–08	2	LEB Oro	12th	14–20		

== Trophies and awards ==
=== Trophies ===
- LEB: (1)
  - 1997
