= CB Villa de Los Barrios =

Basketball team in Andalusia, Spain

Villa de Los Barrios
- Founded: 1996
- History: CB Los Barrios; 1996–2005; CB Villa de Los Barrios; 2005–2010
- Arena: Soldado Samuel Aguilar
- Location: Los Barrios, Andalusia
- Team colors: Green and yellow
- Website: www.cbvilladelosbarrios.es
Home	Away

Club Baloncesto Villa de Los Barrios was a professional basketball team based in Los Barrios, Andalusia, that played in the Soldado Samuel Aguilar, in the LEB league until 2009, when the senior team ceased activity.

== Season by season ==
Season	Tier	Division	Pos.	W–L	Cup competitions	
1997–98	2	LEB	11th	11–17		
1998–99	2	LEB	8th	17–18		
1999–00	2	LEB	11th	14–19		
2000–01	2	LEB	10th	14–16		
2001–02	2	LEB	10th	14–16		
2002–03	2	LEB	10th	14–16		
2003–04	2	LEB	14th	15–19		
2004–05	2	LEB	9th	15–19		
2005–06	2	LEB	11th	16–18		
2006–07	2	LEB	6th	20–17	Copa Príncipe	SF
2007–08	2	LEB Oro	9th	18–19		
2008–09	2	LEB Oro	5th (Note: Resigned to continue playing in LEB Oro.)	20–17		
2009–10	5	1ª División	4th	11–7		

== Trophies and awards ==
=== Individual awards ===
LEB Oro MVP

- Ricardo Guillén – 2007
