= 1993–94 Primera División de Baloncesto =

The 1993–94 Primera División season was the second category of the Spanish basketball league system during the 1993–94 season. It was the fourth played with the name of Primera División.

== Format ==
32 teams played this season and were divided into two groups of 16 teams called Group A and Group B. For the following season the Primera Division disappears and the Liga EBA is created.

- Regular Season
  - Group A, teams that the previous season earned their place in the category. They play all against all to two turns.
  - Group B, teams that the previous season had relegated, were re-caught or invited. They play all against all to two turns. The four last qualified teams would be relegated to Segunda División.
- Promotion PlayOffs
  - The four first qualified teams of the Group A would qualify directly to quarterfinals while teams 5th to 10th of Group A and the two first of the Group B would qualify to the round of 16. The two winners of the playoffs promoted to the 1994–95 ACB season.

== Teams ==
=== Promotion and relegation (pre-season) ===
A total of 32 teams contested the league, including 24 sides from the 1992–93 season, four promoted from the Segunda División and four Wild Cards.

Teams promoted from Segunda División

- Sant Josep Badalona
- Graningas Mollet
- CB Calpe
- Estudiantes Lugo

Wild Cards

- Tenerife Canarias, who obtained a relegation place the previous season.
- Vino de Toro, who obtained a relegation place the previous season.
- Tecnur CABA
- Ambroz Plasencia

Teams that resigned to participate

- CB Granada, merged with CAB Loja.
- Loyola Easo
- CB Mataró
- Collado Villalba
- CB Askatuak sold his place to CB Salamanca
- Conservas Daroca sold his place to Espada Tizona

=== Venues and locations ===
Location of teams in 1993–94 1ªDivisión
Red: Group A; Green: Group B
Location of teams from the Canary Islands in 1993–94 1ªDivisión
Location of teams from Barcelona Area in 1993–94 1ªDivisión
Location of teams from Community of Madrid in 1993–94 1ªDivisión

Team	Home city
Agua de Quess	Oviedo
Ambroz Plasencia	Plasencia
Baloncesto Fuenlabrada	Fuenlabrada
Caja Badajoz	Badajoz
Caja Bilbao	Bilbao
Caja Cantabria	Torrelavega
Cajasur Córdoba	Córdoba
CB Algeciras	Algeciras
CB Canarias	San Cristóbal de la Laguna
CB Castellón	Castellón de la Plana
CB Guadalajara	Guadalajara
CB Las Rozas	Las Rozas
CB Melilla	Melilla
CB Salamanca	Salamanca
CB Tarragona	Tarragona
Centre Comercial Llobregat	Cornellà de Llobregat
ElMonte Huelva	Huelva
Espada Tizona	Burgos
Estudiantes Lugo	Lugo
Gran Canaria	Las Palmas
Graningas Mollet	Mollet del Vallès
Juventud Alcalá	Alcalá de Henares
Los Abades Granada	Granada
Óptica Gandía	Gandía
Peñarredonda Coruña	La Coruña
Sant Josep Badalona	Badalona
Tecnur CABA	Albacete
Tenerife Canarias	Santa Cruz de Tenerife
Trébol Gijón	Gijón
Unicaja Mayoral	Málaga
Vino de Toro	Zamora

== Regular season ==
=== Group A ===
Pos	Team	Pld	W	L	PF	PA	PD	Pts	Qualification or relegation
1	Caja Bilbao	30	24	6	2657	2257	+400	54	Qualification to quarterfinals
2	CB Canarias	30	22	8	2557	2432	+125	52	Qualification to quarterfinals
3	CB Salamanca	30	20	10	2306	2196	+110	50	Qualification to quarterfinals
4	Gran Canaria	30	19	11	2311	2192	+119	49	Qualification to quarterfinals
5	Juventud Alcalá	30	19	11	2311	2165	+146	49	Qualification to first round
6	ElMonte Huelva	30	18	12	2451	2317	+134	48	Qualification to first round
7	Espada Tizona	30	18	12	2288	2228	+60	48	Qualification to first round
8	Los Abades Granada	30	16	14	2315	2252	+63	46	Qualification to first round
9	Trébol Gijón	30	15	15	2284	2298	−14	45	Qualification to first round
10	Peñarredonda Coruña	30	13	17	2260	2307	−47	43	Qualification to first round
11	Centre Comercial Llobregat	30	12	18	2292	2384	−92	42	
12	Las Rozas	30	11	19	2169	2277	−108	41	
13	CB Guadalajara	30	11	19	2288	2326	−38	41	
14	Óptica Gandía	30	10	20	2000	2263	−263	40	
15	CB Tarragona	30	8	22	2136	2537	−401	38	
16	Caja Cantabria	30	4	26	2090	2427	−337	34	

Source: League at JM Almenzar website

=== Group B ===
Pos	Team	Pld	W	L	PF	PA	PD	Pts	Qualification or relegation
1	Sant Josep Badalona	30	23	7	2528	2300	+228	53	Qualification to first round
2	Baloncesto Fuenlabrada	30	22	8	2465	2266	+199	52	Qualification to first round
3	Tenerife Canarias	30	21	9	2526	2283	+243	51	
4	Graningas Mollet	30	19	11	2437	2305	+132	49	
5	CB Calpe	30	18	12	2039	2264	−225	48	
6	Estudiantes Lugo	30	18	12	2543	2475	+68	48	
7	CB Melilla	30	17	13	2281	2211	+70	47	
8	Cajasur Córdoba	30	16	14	2239	2333	−94	46	
9	CB Algeciras	30	15	15	2399	2439	−40	45	
10	Tecnur CABA	30	15	15	2274	2267	+7	45	
11	Ambroz Plasencia	30	13	17	2366	2300	+66	43	
12	Unicaja Mayoral	30	12	18	2324	2344	−20	42	
13	Vino de Toro	30	12	18	2015	2086	−71	42	Relegation to Segunda División
14	Agua de Quess	30	11	19	2299	2500	−201	41	Relegation to Segunda División
15	Caja Badajoz	30	7	23	2149	2428	−279	37	Relegation to Segunda División
16	CB Castellón	30	1	29	2049	2402	−353	31	Relegation to Segunda División

Source: League at JM Almenzar website

== Promotion Playoffs ==
The two winners of the semifinals are promoted to Liga ACB.

First round
A8 Los Abades Granada	63	69
A9 Trébol Gijón	76	72
A5 Juventud Alcalá	94	83
B2 Baloncesto Fuenlabrada	92	82
A7 Espada Tizona	69	79	72
A10 Peñarredonda Coruña	65	86	62
A6 ElMonte Huelva	99	82
B1 Sant Josep Badalona	100	99

Quarterfinals
A1 Caja Bilbao	71	81	62	105	68
A9 Trébol Gijón	76	55	67	87	63
A4 Gran Canaria	61	85	74	72	74
A5 Juventud Alcalá	106	76	78	70	78
A2 CB Canarias	118	78	87
A7 Espada Tizona	105	76	73
A3 CB Salamanca	86	76	68	90
B1 Sant Josep Badalona	71	77	61	83

Semifinals
A1 Caja Bilbao	87	99	85	80	86
A5 Juventud Alcalá	80	88	92	87	75
A2 CB Canarias	85	92	75	84	81
A3 CB Salamanca	94	76	81	81	85

Finals
A1 Caja Bilbao	91	95
A3 CB Salamanca	92	79

== Final standings ==
Pos	Team	Pld	W	L	Qualification or relegation
1	Caja Bilbao	42	31	11	Promoted to ACB
2	CB Salamanca (P)	41	27	14	Promoted to ACB
3	CB Canarias	38	27	11	
4	Juventud Alcalá	42	26	16	
5	Gran Canaria	35	21	14	
6	Espada Tizona	36	20	16	
7	Trébol Gijón	37	19	18	
8	Sant Josep Badalona	36	26	10	
9	ElMonte Huelva	32	18	14	
10	Los Abades Granada	32	16	16	
11	Peñarredonda Coruña	33	14	19	
12	Baloncesto Fuenlabrada	32	22	10	
13	Centre Comercial Llobregat	30	12	18	
14	CB Las Rozas	30	11	19	
15	CB Guadalajara	30	11	19	
16	Óptica Gandía	30	10	20	
17	CB Tarragona	30	8	22	
18	Caja Cantabria	30	4	26	
19	Tenerife Canarias	30	21	9	
20	Graningas Mollet	30	19	11	
21	CB Calpe	30	18	12	
22	Estudiantes Lugo	30	18	12	
23	CB Melilla	30	17	13	
24	Cajasur Córdoba	30	16	14	
25	CB Algeciras	30	15	15	
26	Tecnur CABA	30	15	15	
27	Ambroz Plasencia	30	13	17	
28	Unicaja Mayoral	30	12	18	
29	Vino de Toro	30	12	18	Relegation to Segunda División
30	CB Vetusta	30	11	19	Relegation to Segunda División
31	Caja Badajoz	30	7	23	Relegation to Segunda División
32	CB Castellón	30	1	29	Relegation to Segunda División

Source: hispaligas.net
(P) Promoted
