= Michael Wilson (basketball) =

American basketball player

Michael Wilson is a former player of the Harlem Globetrotters and the University of Memphis, also known as 'Wild Thing'.

Wilson, 6'5, holds the record for the highest dunk. On April 1, 2000, Wilson dunked a basketball on a goal set at 3.65m (12 feet) from the floor; the feat placed him in the Guinness Book Of World Records, and broke a previous record held by former Arizona State University basketball star Joey Johnson, the younger brother of former NBA great Dennis Johnson. However, Wilt Chamberlain was also known to have performed the feat on an experimental basket set up by Phog Allen at the University of Kansas in the 1950s. Chamberlain, unlike Wilson, did not have the advantage of being given an alley-oop. In 2001 the record (3.65m) was repeated by Robertas Javtokas from Lithuania during a local All Stars day.

Michael Wilson played high school basketball at Melrose High School in Memphis, Tennessee. The Texarkana Gazette reported that he had a 52-inch vertical leap.

In 1995, he was a starter on the University of Memphis Tiger basketball team that went to the Sweet 16 under coach Larry Finch.

Wilson is the former Director of Headfirst Basketball.

He is now founder and CEO of World Record Basketball.
