= 2005–06 LEB season =

Spanish basketball league season

The 2005–2006 LEB season was the 10th season of the Liga Española de Baloncesto, second tier of the Spanish basketball.

== LEB Oro standings ==
#	Teams	P	W	L	PF	PA	Qualification or relegation
1	León Caja España	34	26	8	2.510	2.345	Playoffs
2	Basket CAI Zaragoza	34	25	9	2.701	2.524	Playoffs
3	Polaris World Murcia	34	22	12	2.643	2.482	Playoffs
4	Drac Inca	34	21	13	2.667	2.558	Playoffs
5	Bruesa GBC	34	19	15	2.624	2.501	Playoffs
6	CB L'Hospitalet	34	17	17	2.667	2.607	Playoffs
7	CB Tarragona	34	17	17	2.494	2.534	Playoffs
8	Palma Aqua Magica	34	17	17	2.415	2.365	Playoffs
9	Alerta Cantabria	34	17	17	2.544	2.508	
10	UB La Palma	34	16	18	2.443	2.469	
11	Villa de Los Barrios	34	16	18	2.603	2.665	
12	Calefacciones Farho Gijón	34	15	19	2.547	2.645	
13	Tenerife Rural	34	15	19	2.501	2.554	
14	Plus Pujol Lleida	34	14	20	2.385	2.454	
15	Melilla Baloncesto	34	14	20	2.324	2.481	
16	Ciudad de Huelva	34	13	21	2.544	2.640	Relegation playoffs
17	Calpe Aguas de Calpe	34	11	23	2.541	2.663	Relegation playoffs
18	Plasencia-Galco	34	11	23	2.384	2.542	Relegated to LEB-2

== LEB Oro Playoffs ==
Quarter Finals
Leon Caja España	3
Palma Aqua Magica	0
Drac Inca	0
Bruesa GBC	3
Basket CAI Zaragoza	3
CB Tarragona	0
Polaris World Murcia	3
CB L'Hospitalet	0

SemiFinals
Leon Caja España	0
Bruesa GBC	3
Basket CAI Zaragoza	2
Polaris World Murcia	3

Finals
Bruesa GBC	1
Polaris World Murcia	0

=== Playoff seedings, results, and schedules ===
==== Quarter-finals ====
(1) Leon Caja España (26-8) vs. (8) Palma Aqua Magica (17-17)
Leon Caja España win the series 3-0

- Game 1 May 4 @ Leon: Leon Caja España 86, Palma Aqua Magica 74
- Game 2 May 6 @ Leon: Leon Caja España 71, Palma Aqua Magica 69
- Game 3 May 9 @ Palma de Mallorca: Palma Aqua Magica 67, Leon Caja España 73

(2) Basket CAI Zaragoza (25-9) vs. (7) CB Tarragona (17-17)
Basket CAI Zaragoza win the series 3-0

- Game 1 May 4 @ Zaragoza: Basket CAI Zaragoza 87, CB Tarragona 70
- Game 2 May 6 @ Zaragoza: Basket CAI Zaragoza 73, CB Tarragona 63
- Game 3 May 9 @ Tarragona: CB Tarragona 70, Basket CAI Zaragoza 80

(3) Polaris World Murcia (22-12) vs. (6) CB L'Hospitalet (17-17)
Polaris World Murcia win the series 3-0

- Game 1 May 4 @ Murcia: Polaris World Murcia 88, CB L'Hospitalet 75
- Game 2 May 6 @ Murcia: Polaris World Murcia 69, CB L'Hospitalet 57
- Game 3 May 9 @ Hospitalet de Llobregat: CB Hospitalet 61, Polaris World Murcia 67

(4) Drac Inca (21-13) vs. (5) Bruesa GBC (27-17)
Bruesa GBC win the series 3-0

- Game 1 May 4 @ Inca: Drac Inca 70, Bruesa GBC 79
- Game 2 May 6 @ Inca: Drac Inca 74, Bruesa GBC 79
- Game 3 May 9 @ Donostia: Bruesa GBC 88, Drac Inca 82

==== Semifinals ====
(1) Leon Caja España (26-8) vs. (5) Bruesa GBC (27-17)
Bruesa GBC win the series 3-0 and promote to League ACB

- Game 1 May 18 @ Leon: Bruesa GBC 79, Leon Caja España 72
- Game 2 May 20 @ Leon: Leon Caja España 72, Bruesa GBC 73
- Game 3 May 23 @ Donostia: Leon Caja España 81, Bruesa GBC 78

(2) Basket CAI Zaragoza (25-9) vs. (3) Polaris World Murcia (22-12)
Polaris win the series 3-2 and promote to League ACB

- Game 1 May 18 @ Zaragoza: Basket CAI Zaragoza 74, Polaris World Murcia 85
- Game 2 May 20 @ Zaragoza: Basket CAI Zaragoza 85, Polaris World Murcia 73
- Game 3 May 23 @ Murcia: Polaris World Murcia 71, Basket CAI Zaragoza 66
- Game 4 May 25 @ Murcia: Polaris World Murcia 73, Basket CAI Zaragoza 76
- Game 5 May 28 @ Zaragoza: Basket CAI Zaragoza 90, Polaris World Murcia 99

==== LEB Oro Finals ====
These two teams are already promoted to the league ACB.

(5) Bruesa GBC (27-17) vs. (3) Polaris World Murcia (22-12)

- Game 1 June 1 @ Murcia: Bruesa GBC 92, Polaris World Murcia 86
- Bruesa GBC: League LEB CHAMPION
- Bruesa GBC and Polaris World Murcia: Promoted to League ACB

== Relegation playoffs ==
Finals
16	CB Ciudad de Huelva	3
17	Aguas de Calpe	0

Calpe Aguas de Calpe, relegated to LEB-2.

== TV coverage ==
- TVE2
- Teledeporte

== See also ==
- Liga Española de Baloncesto
