= 2003–04 LEB season =

Spanish basketball league season

The 2003–2004 LEB season was the 8th season of the Liga Española de Baloncesto, second tier of the Spanish basketball.

== LEB standings ==
#	Teams	P	W	L	PF	PA	Qualification or relegation
1	Bilbao Basket	34	22	12	2681	2438	Playoffs
2	CB Granada	34	21	13	2755	2566	Playoffs
3	Plasencia Galco	34	21	13	2692	2611	Playoffs
4	León Caja España	34	20	14	2689	2622	Playoffs
5	Coinga Menorca	34	20	14	2795	2761	Playoffs
6	CAI Zaragoza	34	20	14	2768	2663	Playoffs
7	UB La Palma	34	18	16	2684	2679	Playoffs
8	CB Ciudad de Huelva	34	17	17	2715	2651	Playoffs
9	Cáceres Destino Turístico	34	16	18	2564	2611	
10	Melilla Baloncesto	34	16	18	2799	2819	
11	Alerta Cantabria Lobos	34	16	18	2730	2802	
12	Calefacciones Farho Gijón	34	15	19	2647	2674	
13	CB Tarragona	34	15	19	2684	2764	
14	CB Los Barrios	34	15	19	2664	2760	
15	Algeciras Cepsa	34	14	20	2704	2726	
16	Drac Inca	34	14	20	2736	2857	Relegation playoffs
17	Club Ourense Baloncesto	34	14	20	2607	2769	Relegation playoffs
18	CB Aracena	34	12	22	2568	2739	Relegated to LEB-2

== LEB Oro Playoffs ==
The two winners of the semifinals are promoted to Liga ACB.

Quarter Finals
1	Bilbao Basket	3
8	CB Ciudad de Huelva	2
4	León Caja España	3
5	Coinga Menorca	2
2	CB Granada	3
7	UB La Palma	1
3	Plasencia Galco	2
6	CAI Zaragoza	3

SemiFinals
1	Bilbao Basket	3
4	León Caja España	0
2	CB Granada	3
6	CAI Zaragoza	2

Finals
1	Bilbao Basket	85
2	CB Granada	81

== Relegation playoffs ==
Finals
16	Drac Inca	2
17	Ourense Baloncesto	3

Drac Inca, relegated to LEB-2.

== TV coverage ==
- TVE2
- Teledeporte

== See also ==
- Liga Española de Baloncesto
