= 2004–05 LEB season =

Spanish basketball league season

The 2004–2005 LEB season was the 9th season of the Liga Española de Baloncesto, second tier of the Spanish basketball.

== LEB standings ==
#	Teams	P	W	L	PF	PA	Qualification or relegation
1	Baloncesto Fuenlabrada	34	27	7	2676	2402	Playoffs
2	IBB Hoteles Menorca	34	26	8	2601	2405	Playoffs
3	León Caja España	34	24	10	2754	2477	Playoffs
4	CB Ciudad de Huelva	34	22	12	2582	2434	Playoffs
5	Polaris World Murcia	34	20	14	2580	2524	Playoffs
6	CAI Zaragoza	34	19	15	2726	2608	Playoffs
7	CB Tarragona	34	18	16	2602	2635	Playoffs
8	Cáceres 2016 CB	34	17	17	2524	2507	Playoffs
9	CB Los Barrios	34	17	17	2753	2760	
10	Calefacciones Farho Gijón	34	15	19	2559	2616	
11	Plasencia Galco	34	15	19	2402	2405	
12	Melilla Baloncesto	34	14	20	2498	2579	
13	Alerta Cantabria	34	14	20	2488	2679	
14	Algeciras Cepsa	34	13	21	2594	2612	
15	Valls Félix Hotel	34	13	21	2575	2694	
16	UB La Palma	34	12	22	2494	2580	Relegation playoffs
17	Club Ourense Baloncesto	34	11	23	2419	2559	Relegation playoffs
18	Calpe Aguas de Calpe	34	9	25	2449	2800	Relegated to LEB-2

== LEB Oro Playoffs ==
The two winners of the semifinals are promoted to Liga ACB.

Quarter Finals
1	Fuenlabrada	3
8	Cáceres CB	0
4	CB Ciudad de Huelva	3
5	Polaris World Murcia	1
2	IBB Hoteles Menorca	3
7	CB Tarragona	1
3	León Caja España	3
6	CAI Zaragoza	0

SemiFinals
1	Fuenlabrada	3
4	CB Ciudad de Huelva	2
2	IBB Hoteles Menorca	3
3	León Caja España	1

Finals
1	Fuenlabrada	67
2	IBB Hoteles Menorca	66

== Relegation playoffs ==
Finals
16	UB La Palma	3
17	Ourense Baloncesto	1

Club Ourense Baloncesto, relegated to LEB-2.

== TV coverage ==
- TVE2
- Teledeporte

== See also ==
- Liga Española de Baloncesto
