= 2001–02 LEB season =

Spanish basketball league season

The 2001–2002 LEB season was the 6th season of the Liga Española de Baloncesto, the second division of basketball in Spain.

== LEB standings ==
#	Teams	P	W	L	PF	PA	Qualification or relegation
1	Minorisa.net Manresa	30	26	4	2542	2247	Playoffs
2	Club Ourense Baloncesto	30	25	5	2473	2240	Playoffs
3	CB Lucentum Alicante	30	20	10	2497	2310	Playoffs
4	Tenerife Baloncesto	30	20	10	2399	2243	Playoffs
5	León Caja España	30	18	12	2663	2565	Playoffs
6	CB Ciudad de Huelva	30	16	14	2325	2275	Playoffs
7	Melilla Baloncesto	30	15	15	2356	2396	Playoffs
8	Etosa Murcia	30	14	16	2284	2300	Playoffs
9	CD Universidad Complutense	30	14	16	2446	2413	
10	CB Los Barrios	30	14	16	2398	2425	
11	Coinga Menorca	30	12	18	2624	2755	
12	Drac Inca	30	10	20	2227	2390	
13	Ulla Oil Rosalía	30	10	20	2288	2376	Relegation playoffs
14	Cajasur Córdoba	30	9	21	2391	2583	Relegation playoffs
15	Sondeos del Norte	30	9	21	2168	2367	Relegation playoffs
16	Llobregat Centre Cornellà	30	8	22	2314	2510	Relegation playoffs

== LEB Oro Playoffs ==
The two winners of the semifinals are promoted to Liga ACB.

Quarter Finals
1	Minorisa Manresa	3
8	Etosa Murcia	1
4	Tenerife Baloncesto	3
5	León Caja España	2
2	Ourense Baloncesto	3
7	Melilla Baloncesto	2
3	Lucentum Alicante	3
6	CB Ciudad de Huelva	2

SemiFinals
1	Minorisa Manresa	3
4	Tenerife Baloncesto	2
2	Ourense Baloncesto	0
3	Lucentum Alicante	3

Finals
1	Minorisa Manresa	82+85
2	Lucentum Alicante	89+85

== Relegation playoffs ==
Finals
13	Ulla Oil Rosalía	3
16	Llobregat Centre	0

Finals
14	Cajasur	1
15	Sondeos del Norte	3

Cajasur and Llobregat Centre, relegated to LEB-2.

== TV coverage ==
- TVE2
- Teledeporte

== See also ==
- Liga Española de Baloncesto
