= Askatuak SBT =

- Leagues: LEB Plata
- Founded: 1975
- Arena: Polideportivo Municipal José Antonio Gasca
- Location: San Sebastián, Basque Country
- Team colors: Blue and white
- Championships: 1 Liga EBA
- Website: askatuak.com
Home	Away

Askatuak Saki-Baloi Taldea is a basketball club based in San Sebastián, in the Basque Country of Spain, that plays in the Liga EBA.

== History ==
The team competed for four years in the top Spanish league, one of them in the Liga ACB. They also played for the FIBA Korać Cup during two seasons. In 1993 Askatuak sold its 1ª División (second tier) spot to CB Salamanca.

Years later, in 2001, the team resigned its berth in LEB Plata and was substituted as the first basketball team in San Sebastián by the new Gipuzkoa BC.

For the following seasons, Askatuak played in lower divisions, achieving promotions to Liga EBA in 2010 and to LEB Plata in 2012.

== Season by season ==
Season	Tier	Division	Pos.	W–L	Copa del Rey	Other cups		European Competitions		
1975–76	2	2ª División	1st	18–6						
1976–77	1	1ª División	5th	10–12	First round					
1977–78	1	1ª División	6th	7–3–12	Quarterfinalist			3 Korać Cup	R1	0–2
1978–79	1	1ª División	12th	3–19	Round of 16			3 Korać Cup	R2	1–1
1979–80	2	1ª División B	15th	3–27						
1980–83	did not enter any competition									
1983–84	3	2ª División								
1984–85	3	2ª División	2nd	–						
1985–86	2	1ª División B	10th	14–14						
1986–87	2	1ª División B	15th	17–17						
1987–88	2	1ª División B	2nd	28–17						
1988–89	1	Liga ACB	24th	10–33	First round					
1989–90	2	1ª División	14th (Note: Remained in the league after achieving a vacant berth.)	13–22						
1990–91	2	1ª División	10th	21–17						
1991–92	2	1ª División	12th	19–20						
1992–93	2	1ª División	6th (Note: Sold its berth to CB Salamanca.)	20–20						
1993–94	3	2ª División	3rd (Note: Was invited to join the newly created Liga EBA.)							
1994–95	2	Liga EBA	8th	13–13						
1995–96	2	Liga EBA	5th (Note: Was invited to join the newly created LEB League.)	18–12						
1996–97	2	LEB	14th	9–21						
1997–98	2	LEB	8th (Note: Declined to continue playing in LEB.)	14–17		Copa Príncipe	SF			
1998–99	3	Liga EBA	13th	15–19						
1999–00	3	Liga EBA	7th (Note: Was invited to join the newly created LEB 2.)	11–15						
2000–01	3	LEB 2	14th (Note: Declined to continue playing in LEB 2.)	12–23						
2001–02	did not enter any competition									
2002–03	Lower divisions									
2003–04	5	1ª División	3rd							
2004–05	5	1ª División								
2005–06	5	1ª División	16th	15–15						
2006–07	5	1ª División	11th	17–11						
2007–08	6	1ª División	4th	20–8						
2008–09	6	1ª División	7th	16–12						
2009–10	5	1ª División	2nd	20–8						
2010–11	4	Liga EBA	13th	12–12						
2011–12	4	Liga EBA	2nd	21–5						
2012–13	3	LEB Plata	10th	6–14						
2013–14	3	LEB Plata	13th (Note: Resigned its place in Liga EBA.)	5–19						
2014–15	6	2ª División	3rd	20–6						
2015–16	6	2ª División	1st	21–5						
2016–17	5	1ª División	11th	10–16						
2017–18	5	1ª División	12th	7–19						
2018–19	6	2ª División	12th	6–18						

== Trophies and awards ==
=== Trophies ===
- 2nd division championships: (1)
  - 2ª División: (1) 1976
- Liga EBA: (1)
  - 2012
