= 2000–01 LEB season =

Spanish basketball season

The 2000–2001 LEB season was the 5th season of the Liga Española de Baloncesto, second tier of the Spanish basketball.

== LEB standings ==
#	Teams	P	W	L	PF	PA	Qualification or relegation
1	León Caja España	30	23	7	2515	2332	Playoffs
2	Caprabo Lleida	30	22	8	2591	2326	Playoffs
3	Minorisa.net Manresa	30	22	8	2576	2309	Playoffs
4	CB Granada	30	19	11	2523	2419	Playoffs
5	Drac Inca	30	17	13	2293	2259	Playoffs
6	CB Ciudad de Huelva	30	16	14	2409	2326	Playoffs
7	Cajasur Córdoba	30	16	14	2431	2447	Playoffs
8	Coinga Menorca	30	16	14	2592	2500	Playoffs
9	Etosa Murcia	30	15	15	2381	2319	
10	CB Los Barrios	30	14	16	2492	2557	
11	Tenerife Baloncesto	30	12	18	2445	2440	
12	Melilla Baloncesto	30	11	19	2402	2490	
13	Ulla Oil Rosalía	30	10	20	2449	2616	Relegation playoffs
14	Sondeos del Norte	30	10	20	2289	2439	Relegation playoffs
15	Abeconsa Ferrol	30	9	21	2304	2692	Relegation playoffs
16	Badajoz Caja Rural	30	8	22	2326	2547	Relegation playoffs

== LEB Oro Playoffs ==
The two winners of the semifinals are promoted to Liga ACB.

Quarter Finals
1	León Caja España	1
8	Menorca Bàsquet	3
4	CB Granada	3
5	Drac Inca	2
2	Caprabo Lleida	3
7	Cajasur Córdoba	0
3	Minorisa Manresa	3
6	CB Ciudad de Huelva	1

SemiFinals
4	CB Granada	3
8	Menorca Bàsquet	2
2	Caprabo Lleida	3
3	Minorisa Manresa	1

Finals
1	Caprabo Lleida	89+82
2	CB Granada	92+67

== Relegation playoffs ==
Finals
13	Ulla Oil Rosalía	3
16	Badajoz Caja Rural	2

Finals
14	Sondeos del Norte	3
15	Abeconsa Ferrol	0

Badajoz Caja Rural and Abeconsa Ferrol, relegated to LEB-2.

== See also ==
- Liga Española de Baloncesto
