= CI Rosalía de Castro =

Beirasar Rosalía
- Leagues: Liga EBA
- Founded: 1993
- Arena: Pavillón Instituto Rosalia de Castro
- Location: Santiago de Compostela, Galicia
- Team colors: Blue and white
- President: Ubaldo Rueda
- Head coach: César Iglesias
- Championships: 1 LEB Plata championship
- Website: rosaliafedesa.com
Home	Away

Club Instituto Rosalía de Castro is a basketball team based in Santiago de Compostela, Galicia and plays in the Pavillón Instituto Rosalia de Castro, in Liga EBA.

== History ==
The club was born in the Rosalía de Castro High School and it played professionally during several years in LEB Oro and LEB Plata. Since Obradoiro CAB returned to Liga ACB, the club resigned to play professionally and continues its basketball activity in Liga EBA, integrated in the Fedesa Foundation with women's basketball club CB Pío XII.

== Season by season ==
Season	Tier	Division	Pos.	W–L	Cup Competitions	
1998–99	3	Liga EBA	8th (Note: Achieved a vacant berth in LEB.)	15–13		
1999–00	2	LEB	16th	7–23		
2000–01	2	LEB	13th	13–22		
2001–02	2	LEB	13th	13–20		
2002–03	2	LEB	13th	7–27		
2003–04	3	LEB 2	4th	21–14	Copa LEB Plata	RU
2004–05	3	LEB 2	14th	10–25		
2005–06	3	LEB 2	9th	14–16		
2006–07	3	LEB 2	1st	29–12	Copa LEB 2	SF
2007–08	2	LEB Oro	8th	17–19		
2008–09	2	LEB Oro	18th	8–26		
2009–10	3	LEB Plata	15th (Note: Resigned to its place in LEB Plata.)	14–14		
2010–11	4	Liga EBA	21st (Note: Remained in the league after achieving a vacant berth.)	1–21		
2011–12	4	Liga EBA	21st	4–18		
2012–13	5	1ª División	1st	22–2		
2013–14	4	Liga EBA	22nd	5–17		
2014–15	4	Liga EBA	11th	8–18		
2015–16	4	Liga EBA	10th	6–16		
2016–17	4	Liga EBA	8th	13–13		
2017–18	4	Liga EBA	12th	11–19		
2018–19	4	Liga EBA	13th	5–21		

== Notable players ==
- (Spain) David Doblas
- (Slovenia) Sandi Čebular
- (United States) Corsley Edwards
- (United States) Brad Oleson

== Trophies and awards ==
=== Trophies ===
- LEB Plata: (1)
  - 2007
