= CB Plasencia Ambroz =

CB Ambroz
- Founded: 1978
- Arena: Pabellón Ciudad de Plasencia
- Location: Plasencia, Spain
- Team colors: Green and purple
- President: (Spain) Silvia Bartolomé
- Head coach: (Spain) Juan Francisco Serrano
- Website: www.cbplasencia-ambroz.com
Home	Away

Club Baloncesto Ambroz Plasencia, more commonly referred to today by its sponsorship name of Plasencia Extremadura, is a Basketball team based in Plasencia, Extremadura.

== History ==
Former logo of the club, used until 2017.

Plasencia Ambroz was founded in 1978 as a merge of the clubs Centro Juventud and La Salle.

The most important milestone of the club was in 1995, when the club reached the Final Stage of the Liga EBA, and played the promotion playoffs to the top tier, the Liga ACB.

In 2003, Plasencia Ambroz promoted to LEB league, second division, after an expansion of this league to 18 teams. It played in it during three seasons before relegation, outstanding in the first one, when it finished as runner-up of the Copa Príncipe and qualified again to the playoffs for promoting to the ACB League.

Since 2006, the club played in LEB Plata after resigning to its place in 2011, voluntarily to Liga EBA, fourth division, until 2017 when the club came back to the third tier after achieving a vacant berth.

In 2019, after being relegated again to Liga EBA, the senior squad was folded due to the lack of support, maintaining only the youth teams.

== Season by season ==
Season	Tier	Division	Pos.	W–L	Cup competitions	
1993–94	2	1ª División	27th	13–17		
1994–95	2	Liga EBA	4th			
1995–96	2	Liga EBA	2nd			
1996–97	3	Liga EBA	3rd			
1997–98	3	Liga EBA	1st	25–6	Copa EBA	SF
1998–99	3	Liga EBA	3rd	21–12		
1999–00	3	Liga EBA	10th (Note: Joined the newly created LEB 2.)	11–15		
2000–01	3	LEB 2	9th	16–14		
2001–02	3	LEB 2	9th	15–15		
2002–03	3	LEB 2	3rd (Note: Promoted after the expansion of the LEB league to 18 teams.)	25–14	Copa LEB 2	RU
2003–04	2	LEB	5th	23–16	Copa Príncipe	RU
2004–05	2	LEB	11th	15–19		
2005–06	2	LEB	18th	11–23		
2006–07	3	LEB 2	12th	15–19		
2007–08	3	LEB Plata	9th	17–19		
2008–09	3	LEB Plata	9th	16–17		
2009–10	3	LEB Plata	7th	17–17		
2010–11	3	LEB Plata	7th	15–16		
2011–12	3	LEB Plata	11th (Note: Resigned to continue playing in LEB Plata.)	8–16		
2012–13	4	Liga EBA	1st	16–7		
2013–14	4	Liga EBA	2nd	17–8		
2014–15	4	Liga EBA	7th	12–14		
2015–16	4	Liga EBA	1st	19–8		
2016–17	4	Liga EBA	11th (Note: Achieved a vacant place in LEB Plata.)	10–12		
2017–18	3	LEB Plata	11th	12–18		
2018–19	3	LEB Plata	20th	15–19		

== Trophies and awards ==
=== Trophies ===
- Copa Extremadura: (8)
  - 2002, 2003, 2004, 2005, 2006, 2007, 2009, 2010
