= 2002–03 LEB season =

Spanish basketball league competition

The 2002–2003 LEB season was the 7th season of the Liga Española de Baloncesto, second tier of the Spanish basketball.

== LEB standings ==
#	Teams	P	W	L	PF	PA	Qualification or relegation
1	Unelco Tenerife	30	24	6	2437	2141	Playoffs
2	Etosa Murcia	30	20	10	2317	2280	Playoffs
3	Coinga Menorca	30	20	10	2551	2429	Playoffs
4	Bilbao Basket	30	19	11	2549	2357	Playoffs
5	León Caja España	30	16	14	2440	2445	Playoffs
6	CD Universidad Complutense	30	16	14	2418	2329	Playoffs
7	Cantabria Lobos	30	16	14	2333	2356	Playoffs
8	Isastur Gijón	30	15	15	2278	2322	Playoffs
9	Club Ourense Baloncesto	30	14	16	2366	2311	
10	CB Los Barrios	30	14	16	2328	2294	
11	Melilla Baloncesto	30	13	17	2254	2379	
12	CB Tarragona	30	12	18	2328	2379	
13	Drac Inca	30	12	18	2328	2379	Relegation playoffs
14	CAI Zaragoza	30	12	18	2370	2508	Relegation playoffs
15	CB Ciudad de Huelva	30	11	19	2467	2577	Relegation playoffs
16	Ulla Oil Rosalía	30	6	24	2183	2438	Relegation playoffs

== LEB Oro Playoffs ==
The two winners of the semifinals are promoted to Liga ACB.

Quarter Finals
1	Unelco Tenerife	3
8	Isastur Gijón	1
4	Bilbao Basket	2
5	León Caja España	3
2	Etosa Murcia	3
7	Cantabria Lobos	2
3	Coinga Menorca	2
6	Univ. Complutense	3

SemiFinals
1	Unelco Tenerife	3
5	León Caja España	1
2	Etosa Murcia	3
6	Univ. Complutense	0

Finals
1	Unelco Tenerife	64
2	Etosa Murcia	78

== Relegation playoffs ==
Finals
13	Drac Inca	3
16	Ulla Oil Rosalía	1

Finals
14	CAI Zaragoza	3
15	CB Ciudad de Huelva	2

CB Ciudad de Huelva and Ulla Oil Rosalía, relegated to LEB-2.

== TV coverage ==
- TVE2
- Teledeporte

== See also ==
- Liga Española de Baloncesto
