= 1995–96 Liga EBA season =

Spanish basketball season

The 1995–96 Liga EBA season was the second season of this competition, second tier of Spanish basketball. Due to the reduction of the Liga ACB to 18 teams for the next seasons, there was not any promotion from this league.

== Regular season ==
Key to colors
Qualify to the Previous Playoffs
Qualify to Relegation Playoffs

=== Group North ===
#	Teams	P	W	L
1	CB Breogán	30	25	5
2	SD Patronato	30	23	7
3	Cantabria Baloncesto	30	23	7
4	Askatuak SBT	30	18	12
5	Arrasate SB	30	17	13
6	Vino de Toro	30	16	14
7	CB Arteixo	30	16	14
8	Baloncesto León B	30	16	14
9	CB Galicia	30	15	15
10	CB Espolón	30	15	15
11	CD Alsasua	30	14	16
12	CB Cíes Vigo	30	13	17
13	CB Ciudad de Ponferrada	30	9	21
14	CD Maristas Burgos	30	9	21
15	CB Coruña	30	6	24
16	Viña Costeira	30	5	25

=== Group East ===
#	Teams	P	W	L
1	CB Cornellà	30	23	7
2	Valencia BC	30	22	8
3	CB Mollet	30	19	11
4	CB Inca	30	19	11
5	CB Valls	30	18	12
6	UER Pineda de Mar	30	17	13
7	CB Montcada	30	16	14
8	Gandía BA	30	15	15
9	Menorca Bàsquet	30	15	15
10	CB Llíria	30	13	17
11	CB Tarragona	30	13	17
12	CB Lucentum Alicante	30	12	18
13	CB Sant Josep Badalona	30	12	18
14	CB Archena	30	10	20
15	CB Calpe	30	10	20
16	CB Monzón	30	7	23

=== Group Centre ===
#	Teams	P	W	L
1	Círculo Badajoz			
2	Bansander			
3	Baloncesto Fuenlabrada			
4	CB Plasencia			
5	CP La Serena			
6	Real Canoe NC			
7	CB Guadalajara			
8	CB Estudiantes B			
9	CB Las Rozas			
10	CB Valladolid B			
11	Baloncesto Fuenlabrada B			
12	CB San Fernando			
13	CB Alcobendas			

=== Group South ===
#	Teams	P	W	L
1	CB Huelva 76			
2	CB Tenerife Canarias			
3	CB Granada			
4	Club Melilla Baloncesto			
5	Club Albolote			
6	CB Fuerteventura			
7	CB Ciudad de Algeciras			
8	CB El Ejido			
9	CB Marbella			
10	Baloncesto Málaga B			
11	CB Juventud Córdoba			
12	CB Motril			
13	CB Pozoblanco			
14	CB Sevilla B			
15	CB San Fernando			
16	Ciudad de Las Palmas			

== Second round ==
Key to colors
Qualify to the Final Eight

=== Group A ===
#	Teams	P	W	L
1	CB Breogán	3	3	0
2	CB Albolote	3	2	1
3	Real Canoe NC	3	1	2
4	CB Mollet	3	0	3

=== Group B ===
#	Teams	P	W	L
1	CB Granada	3	3	0
2	SD Patronato	3	2	1
3	CB Estudiantes B	3	1	2
4	CB Inca	3	0	3

=== Group C ===
#	Teams	P	W	L
1	Cantabria Baloncesto	3	2	1
2	CB Cornellà	3	2	1
3	CB Tenerife Canarias	3	1	2
4	CB Plasencia	3	1	2

=== Group D ===
#	Teams	P	W	L
1	Valencia BC	3	2	1
2	CB Huelva 76	3	2	1
3	Baloncesto Fuenlabrada	3	2	1
4	Arrasate SB	3	0	3

== Final Eight ==
The Final Eight of the Liga EBA was held in the Pazo dos Deportes of Lugo.

Quarterfinals
1A	CB Breogán	65
2B	CB Cornellà	89
1B	CB Granada	92
2D	CD Huelva 76	67
1C	Cantabria Baloncesto	75
2B	SD Patronato	79
1D	Valencia BC	99
2A	CB Albolote	75

Semifinals
2C	CB Cornellà	65
1B	CB Granada	81
2B	SD Patronato	65
1D	Valencia BC	87

Final
1B	CB Granada	104
1D	Valencia BC	87
