= 2015–16 ACB season =

Liga Endesa^{1}
- Season: 2015–16
- Games played: 306 (Regular season); 22 (Playoffs)
- Teams: 18
- TV partners: TVE, Movistar+

Regular season
- Top seed: FC Barcelona Lassa
- Season MVP: (Greece) Ioannis Bourousis
- Relegated: Movistar Estudiantes; RETAbet.es GBC

Finals
- Champions: Real Madrid
- Runners-up: FC Barcelona Lassa
- Semi-finalists: Valencia Basket; Laboral Kutxa Baskonia
- Finals MVP: (Spain) Sergio Llull

Statistical leaders
Points	(United States) Darius Adams	17.2
Rebounds	(Serbia) Dejan Musli	7.4
Assists	(Spain) Sergio Rodríguez	6.1
Index Rating	(Serbia) Dejan Musli	19.7

Records
- Biggest home win: Barcelona 108–54 Sevilla (14 January 2016)
- Biggest away win: GBC 79–121 Valencia (17 April 2016)
- Highest scoring: Estudiantes 110–116 Zaragoza (6 December 2015)
- Winning streak: 18 games Valencia Basket
- Losing streak: 10 games RETAbet.es GBC
- Highest attendance: 15,544; Baskonia 86–80 Madrid (3 January 2016)
- Lowest attendance: 1,056; GBC 60–86 Unicaja (11 May 2016)
- Attendance: 2,082,234
- Average attendance: 6,387
- All statistics correct as of 22 June 2016.^{1} Sponsored league name, referring to Endesa.

The 2015–16 ACB season was the 33rd season of the Spanish basketball league, also called Liga Endesa in its sponsored identity. The regular season started on October 10, 2015, and ended on May 22, 2016. The playoffs was played from May 26 to June 26, 2016.

== Teams ==
=== Promotion and relegation (pre-season) ===
A total of 18 teams contest the league, including 16 sides from the 2014–15 season and two promoted from the 2014–15 LEB Oro.

Teams promoted from LEB Oro

- ~~Ford Burgos~~ (did not fulfill the requirements, its place was offered RETAbet.es GBC)
- ~~Club Ourense Baloncesto~~ (despite the club fulfilled the requirements, the assembly of the league did not admit after did not pass the audit. Its place was offered to Montakit Fuenlabrada)

=== Venues and locations ===
Location of teams in 2015–16 ACB
Location of teams from the Canary Islands in 2015–16 ACB

Team	Home city	Arena	Capacity
Baloncesto Sevilla	Sevilla	San Pablo	7,626
CAI Zaragoza	Zaragoza	Pabellón Príncipe Felipe	10,744
Dominion Bilbao Basket	Bilbao	Bilbao Arena	10,014
FC Barcelona Lassa	Barcelona	Palau Blaugrana	7,585
FIATC Joventut	Badalona	Palau Municipal d'Esports	8,500
Herbalife Gran Canaria	Las Palmas	Gran Canaria Arena	9,870
Iberostar Tenerife	San Cristóbal de La Laguna	Santiago Martín	5,003
ICL Manresa	Manresa	Nou Congost	5,000
Laboral Kutxa Baskonia	Vitoria-Gasteiz	Fernando Buesa Arena	15,504
Montakit Fuenlabrada	Fuenlabrada	Fernando Martín	5,100
MoraBanc Andorra	Andorra la Vella	Poliesportiu d'Andorra	5,000
Movistar Estudiantes	Madrid	Barclaycard Center	15,000
Real Madrid	Madrid	Barclaycard Center	15,000
RETAbet.es GBC	San Sebastián	San Sebastián Arena	11,000
Rio Natura Monbus Obradoiro	Santiago de Compostela	Multiusos Fontes do Sar	5,060
UCAM Murcia	Murcia	Palacio de Deportes	7,341
Unicaja	Málaga	Martín Carpena	10,233
Valencia Basket	Valencia	Fuente de San Luis	8,500

=== Personnel and sponsorship ===
Team	Head coach	Captain	Kit manufacturer	Shirt sponsor
Baloncesto Sevilla	(Spain) Luis Casimiro	(Czech Republic) Ondřej Balvín	Spalding	
CAI Zaragoza	(Spain) Andreu Casadevall	(Netherlands) Henk Norel	Mercury	Caja Inmaculada
Dominion Bilbao Basket	(Spain) Sito Alonso	(Spain) Álex Mumbrú	Erreà	Dominion, RETAbet
FC Barcelona Lassa	(Spain) Xavi Pascual	(Spain) Juan Carlos Navarro	Nike	Lassa Tyres
FIATC Joventut	(Spain) Salva Maldonado	(Spain) Nacho Llovet	Spalding	FIATC
Herbalife Gran Canaria	(Spain) Aíto García Reneses	(Dominican Republic) Eulis Báez	Spalding	Herbalife
Iberostar Tenerife	(Spain) Txus Vidorreta	(Argentina) Nicolás Richotti	Austral	Iberostar
ICL Manresa	(Spain) Ibon Navarro	(Spain) Álex Hernández	Joma	ICL Iberia
Laboral Kutxa Baskonia	(Croatia) Velimir Perasović	(France) Fabien Causeur	Hummel	Laboral Kutxa
Montakit Fuenlabrada	(Spain) Jota Cuspinera	(Latvia) Rolands Šmits	BFS	Montakit
MoraBanc Andorra	(Spain) Joan Peñarroya	(Spain) Víctor Sada	Kon	MoraBanc
Movistar Estudiantes	(Spain) Sergio Valdeolmillos	(Spain) Jaime Fernández	Joma	Movistar
Real Madrid	(Spain) Pablo Laso	(Spain) Felipe Reyes	Adidas	Teka
RETAbet.es GBC	(Spain) Porfirio Fisac	(Spain) David Doblas	Elements	RETAbet.es
Río Natura Monbus Obradoiro	(Spain) Moncho Fernández	(Spain) Jesús Chagoyen	Vive	Río Natura, Monbus
UCAM Murcia	(Greece) Fotios Katsikaris	(Spain) José Ángel Antelo	Spalding	UCAM
Unicaja	(Spain) Joan Plaza	(Spain) Fran Vázquez	Spalding	Unicaja
Valencia Basket	(Spain) Pedro Martínez	(Spain) Rafa Martínez	Luanvi	Cultura del Esfuerzo^{1}

Notes
1. Cultura del Esfuerzo is the motto of the club.

=== Managerial changes ===
Team	Outgoing manager	Manner of departure	Date of vacancy	Position in table	Replaced with	Date of appointment
Laboral Kutxa Baskonia	(Spain) Ibon Navarro	End of contract	5 June 2015	Pre-season	(Croatia) Velimir Perasović	6 June 2015
UCAM Murcia	(Spain) Diego Ocampo	End of contract	12 June 2015	Pre-season	(Greece) Fotios Katsikaris	1 July 2015
Valencia Basket	(Spain) Carles Duran	Signed as assistant coach	15 June 2015	Pre-season	(Spain) Pedro Martínez	21 June 2015
ICL Manresa	(Spain) Pedro Martínez	Resigned	19 June 2015	Pre-season	(Spain) Ibon Navarro	16 July 2015
Movistar Estudiantes	(Spain) Txus Vidorreta	End of contract	30 June 2015	Pre-season	(Spain) Diego Ocampo	14 July 2015
Montakit Fuenlabrada	(Spain) Jesús Sala	End of contract	30 June 2015	Pre-season	(Croatia) Žan Tabak	10 July 2015
Iberostar Tenerife	(Spain) Alejandro Martínez	Resigned	5 November 2015	16th (0–4)	(Spain) Txus Vidorreta	5 November 2015
Montakit Fuenlabrada	(Croatia) Žan Tabak	Signed for Maccabi Tel Aviv	16 November 2015	8th (3–3)	(Spain) Jota Cuspinera	17 November 2015
CAI Zaragoza	(Spain) Joaquín Ruiz Lorente	Sacked	22 November 2015	16th (1–6)	(Spain) Andreu Casadevall	23 November 2015
RETAbet.es GBC	(Spain) Jaume Ponsarnau	Sacked	1 December 2015	18th (0–8)	(Spain) Porfirio Fisac	2 December 2015
Movistar Estudiantes	(Spain) Diego Ocampo	Sacked	18 January 2016	17th (3–13)	(Spain) Sergio Valdeolmillos	29 January 2016

== Regular season ==
=== League table ===
Pos	Team	Pld	W	L	PF	PA	PD	Qualification or relegation
1	FC Barcelona Lassa	34	29	5	2835	2384	+451	Qualification to playoffs
2	Real Madrid	34	29	5	3229	2767	+462	Qualification to playoffs
3	Valencia Basket	34	28	6	2831	2501	+330	Qualification to playoffs
4	Laboral Kutxa Baskonia	34	24	10	2987	2703	+284	Qualification to playoffs
5	Herbalife Gran Canaria	34	21	13	2818	2705	+113	Qualification to playoffs
6	Unicaja	34	20	14	2637	2508	+129	Qualification to playoffs
7	UCAM Murcia	34	18	16	2683	2663	+20	Qualification to playoffs
8	Montakit Fuenlabrada	34	17	17	2793	2854	−61	Qualification to playoffs
9	Iberostar Tenerife	34	16	18	2610	2708	−98	
10	Dominion Bilbao Basket	34	16	18	2647	2726	−79	
11	Baloncesto Sevilla	34	14	20	2662	2873	−211	
12	CAI Zaragoza	34	13	21	2719	2777	−58	
13	FIATC Joventut	34	13	21	2634	2783	−149	
14	MoraBanc Andorra	34	12	22	2744	2827	−83	
15	Rio Natura Monbus Obradoiro	34	10	24	2564	2685	−121	
16	ICL Manresa	34	10	24	2383	2669	−286	
17	Movistar Estudiantes (R)	34	9	25	2564	2789	−225	Relegation to LEB Oro
18	RETAbet.es GBC (R)	34	7	27	2477	2895	−418	Relegation to LEB Oro

Source: ACB
(R) Relegated

=== Positions by round ===
The table lists the positions of teams after completion of each round.

Team \ Round	1	2	3	4	5	6	7	8	9	10	11	12	13	14	15	16	17	18	19	20	21	22	23	24	25	26	27	28	29	30	31	32	33	34
FC Barcelona Lassa	6	2	2	1	1	1	2	2	2	3	3	3	2	2	2	2	2	2	2	2	1	1	1	1	1	1	1	1	1	1	1	1	1	1
Real Madrid	11	7	5	4	4	3	3	3	3	2	2	2	3	3	3	4	4	3	3	3	3	4	3	3	3	3	3	3	3	3	3	3	2	2
Valencia Basket	8	5	4	3	2	2	1	1	1	1	1	1	1	1	1	1	1	1	1	1	2	2	2	2	2	2	2	2	2	2	2	2	3	3
Laboral Kutxa Baskonia	3	3	3	2	5	4	4	4	4	4	4	4	4	4	4	3	3	4	4	4	4	3	4	4	4	4	4	4	4	4	4	4	4	4
Herbalife Gran Canaria	2	1	1	5	3	6	5	5	5	5	5	5	5	5	5	5	5	5	5	5	5	5	5	5	5	5	5	5	5	5	5	5	5	5
Unicaja	9	4	7	10	8	9	9	8	6	6	6	9	7	8	6	6	8	7	6	7	9	9	7	7	7	6	6	6	6	6	6	6	6	6
UCAM Murcia	10	15	14	14	10	11	13	12	14	14	14	15	13	15	11	10	10	10	10	10	8	7	8	9	8	10	8	9	9	9	8	8	7	7
Montakit Fuenlabrada	4	11	13	11	11	8	10	11	9	13	10	6	9	7	9	9	7	6	7	6	6	6	6	6	6	7	7	7	8	7	7	7	8	8
Iberostar Tenerife	13	14	15	16	17	16	14	15	13	12	13	14	15	14	15	12	11	12	12	12	11	12	11	11	9	8	9	10	10	10	10	10	9	9
Dominion Bilbao Basket	5	13	10	7	9	10	8	9	11	10	9	12	8	11	8	8	6	9	8	8	7	8	9	8	10	9	10	8	7	8	9	9	10	10
Baloncesto Sevilla	18	18	18	17	16	14	15	14	15	15	15	13	14	16	16	16	16	16	16	16	14	16	13	13	13	13	13	13	11	12	11	11	11	11
CAI Zaragoza	12	8	11	12	13	15	16	16	16	16	16	16	16	13	14	15	15	15	14	14	15	13	14	14	14	14	14	15	14	13	14	14	13	12
FIATC Joventut	7	9	8	6	6	5	6	7	8	8	8	11	12	10	12	13	12	11	11	11	12	11	12	12	12	12	12	12	13	14	13	13	14	13
MoraBanc Andorra	14	12	12	13	14	12	11	13	10	9	11	7	6	6	7	7	9	8	9	9	10	10	10	10	11	11	11	11	12	11	12	12	12	14
Rio Natura Monbus Obradoiro	1	6	6	8	7	7	7	6	7	7	7	10	11	9	10	11	14	14	15	15	16	14	15	15	16	16	16	17	16	16	16	16	15	15
ICL Manresa	15	10	9	9	12	13	12	10	12	11	12	8	10	12	13	14	13	13	13	13	13	15	16	16	15	15	15	14	15	15	15	15	16	16
Movistar Estudiantes	16	16	16	15	15	17	17	17	17	17	17	17	17	17	17	17	17	17	18	17	17	17	17	17	17	17	17	16	17	17	17	17	17	17
RETAbet.es GBC	17	17	17	18	18	18	18	18	18	18	18	18	18	18	18	18	18	18	17	18	18	18	18	18	18	18	18	18	18	18	18	18	18	18

=== Results ===
Home \ Away	SEV	CAI	DBB	FCB	CJB	HGC	TFE	ICL	LBO	FUE	MBA	MOV	RMB	GBC	OBR	UCM	UNI	VBC
Baloncesto Sevilla	—	73–84	71–81	58–97	106–101	97–72	81–76	67–84	100–92	85–78	88–81	82–59	90–97	86–80	67–58	85–90	94–84	67–81
CAI Zaragoza	91–87	—	69–71	76–87	94–83	87–96	78–65	82–65	66–90	79–80	73–80	81–62	80–88	80–59	76–64	84–64	76–72	75–78
Dominion Bilbao Basket	101–82	72–73	—	55–77	85–77	59–85	64–67	73–63	89–83	86–71	83–72	85–91	80–71	92–99	88–83	90–79	88–70	104–111
FC Barcelona Lassa	108–54	84–76	66–57	—	83–74	85–75	93–58	84–57	89–68	76–65	84–79	89–67	86–91	97–61	67–57	77–71	83–77	91–94
FIATC Joventut	89–83	71–70	73–92	59–85	—	96–76	83–75	63–76	68–89	66–79	79–90	75–58	69–79	90–88	74–71	94–84	84–90	66–73
Herbalife Gran Canaria	76–67	91–79	91–85	81–96	82–67	—	90–80	88–59	93–90	109–88	98–85	82–80	93–103	97–64	88–75	87–75	98–65	68–84
Iberostar Tenerife	90–71	82–78	77–71	64–83	73–68	65–63	—	65–71	93–80	67–92	81–83	73–75	93–84	72–74	71–56	70–69	57–64	82–86
ICL Manresa	65–72	86–79	67–72	60–75	84–85	70–78	86–73	—	76–85	73–78	61–74	85–67	70–102	78–80	64–81	77–69	64–75	62–74
Laboral Kutxa Baskonia	89–73	100–71	108–62	87–79	102–99	77–67	92–98	83–80	—	101–79	95–83	107–77	86–80	101–73	82–75	90–67	56–83	79–73
Montakit Fuenlabrada	79–81	105–85	79–75	82–84	80–81	92–72	85–94	78–60	97–108	—	78–72	85–71	91–85	94–82	90–85	61–73	89–79	81–86
MoraBanc Andorra	92–73	91–81	69–79	66–89	96–65	84–77	77–79	74–77	91–99	80–89	—	84–82	80–99	88–70	74–84	86–91	82–79	78–86
Movistar Estudiantes	102–76	110–116	81–70	74–69	83–86	70–87	80–84	86–57	58–85	74–80	75–82	—	75–80	85–90	71–70	67–82	91–84	73–81
Real Madrid	107–83	96–84	102–80	84–91	91–77	85–68	112–89	106–68	93–88	129–81	107–78	97–79	—	94–88	111–81	101–80	85–80	82–88
RETAbet.es GBC	68–76	75–84	63–75	69–84	70–74	79–87	71–80	89–70	83–91	68–82	83–80	78–73	61–94	—	82–75	67–76	60–86	79–121
Rio Natura Monbus	88–53	82–67	93–89	62–69	83–79	68–80	82–84	71–79	69–86	95–100	104–103	73–71	63–79	81–68	—	88–69	64–77	79–91
UCAM Murcia	80–76	110–102	96–68	74–82	80–78	71–75	88–83	73–75	68–66	99–75	76–72	83–70	99–104	78–64	87–83	—	58–60	80–62
Unicaja	71–66	77–69	82–77	77–81	70–59	92–87	85–75	85–58	66–74	81–59	82–71	89–59	62–88	94–55	73–65	79–90	—	77–65
Valencia Basket	82–92	81–74	85–49	75–65	76–69	86–61	93–75	83–56	85–78	100–84	81–67	62–68	84–85	92–65	76–56	65–54	81–70	—

Legend: Blue = home team win; Red = away team win.

== Playoffs ==
Quarterfinals
FC Barcelona Lassa	99	84
Montakit Fuenlabrada	65	68
Laboral Kutxa Baskonia	81	87	78
Herbalife Gran Canaria	76	93	71
Real Madrid	107	87	93
UCAM Murcia	103	91	72
Valencia Basket	79	88
Unicaja	75	59

Semifinals
FC Barcelona Lassa	84	73	83	85
Laboral Kutxa Baskonia	57	68	89	63
Real Madrid	82	97	86	82
Valencia Basket	57	88	87	80

Finals
FC Barcelona Lassa	100	70	74	84
Real Madrid	99	90	91	91

== Final standings ==
Pos	Team	Pld	W	L	Qualification or relegation
1	Real Madrid (C)	45	37	8	Already qualified to EuroLeague
2	FC Barcelona Lassa	44	35	9	Already qualified to EuroLeague
3	Valencia Basket	40	31	9	Qualification to EuroCup
4	Laboral Kutxa Baskonia	41	27	14	Already qualified to EuroLeague
5	Herbalife Gran Canaria	37	22	15	Qualification to EuroCup
6	Unicaja	36	20	16	Qualification to EuroCup
7	UCAM Murcia	37	19	18	Qualification to EuroCup
8	Montakit Fuenlabrada (Note: Montakit Fuenlabrada qualified to EuroCup through an allocated vacancy from any withdrawal.)	36	17	19	Qualification to EuroCup
9	Iberostar Tenerife	34	16	18	Qualification to Champions League regular season
10	Dominion Bilbao Basket (Note: Dominion Bilbao Basket qualified to EuroCup through a wild card.)	34	16	18	Qualification to EuroCup
11	Baloncesto Sevilla	34	14	20	
12	CAI Zaragoza	34	13	21	
13	FIATC Joventut	34	13	21	
14	MoraBanc Andorra	34	12	22	
15	Rio Natura Monbus Obradoiro	34	10	24	
16	ICL Manresa	34	10	24	
17	Movistar Estudiantes (R)	34	9	25	Relegation to LEB Oro
18	RETAbet.es GBC (R)	34	7	27	Relegation to LEB Oro

Source: ACB
(C) Champions; (R) Relegated

== Attendances ==
Attendances include playoff games:

Pos	Team	Total	High	Low	Average	Change
1	Laboral Kutxa Baskonia	208,276	15,544	6,729	9,918	+11.2%
2	Dominion Bilbao Basket	154,076	10,004	7,704	9,063	+2.3%
3	Real Madrid	197,353	13,149	6,342	8,971	−4.6%
4	Movistar Estudiantes	147,055	13,200	5,860	8,650	+10.3%
5	Valencia Basket	164,200	8,500	7,200	8,210	+1.9%
6	Unicaja	132,127	10,524	5,723	7,340	−3.0%
7	CAI Zaragoza	114,304	9,145	5,253	7,144	−9.9%
8	Herbalife Gran Canaria	121,765	9,097	4,859	6,765	+8.1%
9	UCAM Murcia	106,756	7,596	4,624	5,931	−0.6%
10	Rio Natura Monbus Obradoiro	89,846	6,000	4,727	5,264	+3.9%
11	Montakit Fuenlabrada	93,364	5,700	4,056	5,187	+3.9%
12	FC Barcelona Lassa	111,624	6,742	3,879	5,074	+4.2%
13	FIATC Joventut	83,945	9,143	2,348	4,938	−16.7%
14	Baloncesto Sevilla	77,285	7,260	3,084	4,546	+9.5%
15	ICL Manresa	73,610	4,825	3,870	4,330	+1.8%
16	RETAbet.es GBC	69,944	5,703	1,056	4,114	−26.4%
17	MoraBanc Andorra	68,625	4,630	3,623	4,037	+12.2%
18	Iberostar Tenerife	68,439	5,142	3,182	4,026	−1.0%
	League total	2,082,234	15,544	1,056	6,387	+1.6%

Updated to games played on 20 June 2016
Source: ACB

== Statistics ==
=== Points ===
Pos	Player	Club	PPG
1	(United States) Darius Adams	Laboral Kutxa Baskonia	17.2
2	(Spain) Álex Mumbrú	Dominion Bilbao Basket	15.2
3	(Poland) Adam Waczyński	Rio Natura Monbus Obradoiro	14.6
4	(United States) Justin Hamilton	Valencia Basket	14.2
5	(United States) Marcus Landry	RETAbet.es GBC	14.0

=== Rebounds ===
Pos	Player	Club	RPG
1	(Serbia) Dejan Musli	ICL Manresa	7.4
2	(Czech Republic) Ondřej Balvín	Baloncesto Sevilla	7.4
3	(Croatia) Ante Tomić	FC Barcelona Lassa	7.3
4	(Greece) Ioannis Bourousis	Laboral Kutxa Baskonia	7.1
5	(Slovenia) Alen Omić	Herbalife Gran Canaria	6.9

=== Assists ===
Pos	Player	Club	APG
1	(Spain) Sergio Rodríguez	Real Madrid	6.1
2	(Argentina) Facundo Campazzo	UCAM Murcia	5.3
3	(Spain) Pedro Llompart	RETAbet.es GBC	5.0
4	(Spain) Sergio Llull	Real Madrid	4.8
5	(United States) Donnie McGrath	Rio Natura Monbus Obradoiro	4.7

=== Performance Index Rating ===
Pos	Player	Club	PPG
1	(Serbia) Dejan Musli	ICL Manresa	19.7
2	(Greece) Ioannis Bourousis	Laboral Kutxa Baskonia	18.9
3	(Mexico) Gustavo Ayón	Real Madrid	17.8
4	(Croatia) Ante Tomić	FC Barcelona Lassa	17.3
5	(Georgia (country)) Giorgi Shermadini	MoraBanc Andorra	16.9

Source: ACB

== ACB clubs in European competitions ==
Team	Competition	Progress
Laboral Kutxa Baskonia	Euroleague	Final Four
FC Barcelona Lassa	Euroleague	Playoffs
Real Madrid	Euroleague	Playoffs
Unicaja	Euroleague	Top 16
Herbalife Gran Canaria	Eurocup	Semifinals
CAI Zaragoza	Eurocup	Eighthfinals
Dominion Bilbao Basket	Eurocup	Last 32
Valencia Basket	Eurocup	Last 32

== Awards ==
All official awards of the 2015–16 ACB season.

=== MVP ===
Pos.	Player	Team
C	(Greece) Ioannis Bourousis	Laboral Kutxa Baskonia

=== Finals MVP ===
Pos.	Player	Team
PG	(Spain) Sergio Llull	Real Madrid

=== All-ACB Teams ===
Pos.	First Team		Second Team	
Pos.	Player	Team	Player	Team
PG	(Spain) Sergio Rodríguez	Real Madrid	(Czech Republic) Tomáš Satoranský	FC Barcelona Lassa
SG	(United States) Darius Adams	Laboral Kutxa Baskonia	(Croatia) Marko Popović	Montakit Fuenlabrada
SF	(Spain) Álex Mumbrú	Dominion Bilbao Basket	(Hungary) Ádám Hanga	Laboral Kutxa Baskonia
PF	(United States) Justin Hamilton	Valencia Basket	(Mexico) Gustavo Ayón	Real Madrid
C	(Greece) Ioannis Bourousis	Laboral Kutxa Baskonia	(Serbia) Dejan Musli	ICL Manresa

=== Best Young Player Award ===
Pos.	Player	Team
PF	(Spain) Juancho Hernangómez	Movistar Estudiantes

=== Best All-Young Team ===
Pos.	Player	Team
PG	(Slovenia) Luka Dončić	Real Madrid
SG	(Sweden) Ludde Håkanson	Baloncesto Sevilla
SF	(Spain) Santiago Yusta	Rio Natura Monbus Obradoiro
PF	(Spain) Juancho Hernangómez	Movistar Estudiantes
C	(Spain) Guillermo Hernangómez	Real Madrid

=== Player of the week ===
Date	Player	Team	PIR
1	(Croatia) Ante Tomić	FC Barcelona Lassa	34
2	(Greece) Ioannis Bourousis	Laboral Kutxa Baskonia	32
3	(Poland) Adam Waczyński	Río Natura Monbús Obradoiro	36
4	(Spain) Darío Brizuela	Movistar Estudiantes	33
5	(Spain) José Ángel Antelo	UCAM Murcia	27
6	(United States) Justin Hamilton	Valencia Basket	39
7	(Montenegro) Blagota Sekulić	Iberostar Tenerife	31
8	(Argentina) Facundo Campazzo	UCAM Murcia	33
9	(Montenegro) Blagota Sekulić (2)	Iberostar Tenerife	31
10	(Spain) Pierre Oriola	Baloncesto Sevilla	35
11	(Greece) Ioannis Bourousis (2)	Laboral Kutxa Baskonia	30
12	(Belgium) Jonathan Tabu	Montakit Fuenlabrada	35
13	(Greece) Ioannis Bourousis (3)	Laboral Kutxa Baskonia	33
14	(Greece) Ioannis Bourousis (4)	Laboral Kutxa Baskonia	37
15	(Slovenia) Alen Omić	Herbalife Gran Canaria	30
16	(Spain) Salva Arco	Iberostar Tenerife	23
16	(Montenegro) Bojan Dubljević	Valencia Basket	23
16	(Brazil) Augusto Lima	UCAM Murcia	23
17	(Greece) Ioannis Bourousis (5)	Laboral Kutxa Baskonia	40
18	(Croatia) Marko Popović	Montakit Fuenlabrada	30
19	(Spain) Tomás Bellas	CAI Zaragoza	33
20	(Spain) Sergio Llull	Real Madrid	36
21	(United States) Scott Bamforth	Baloncesto Sevilla	24
22	(United States) Darius Adams	Laboral Kutxa Baskonia	35
23	(United States) Scott Bamforth (2)	Baloncesto Sevilla	32
24	(Slovenia) Bostjan Nachbar	Baloncesto Sevilla	28
24	(United States) Will Thomas	Unicaja	28
25	(Belgium) Jonathan Tabu (2)	Montakit Fuenlabrada	34
26	(Mexico) Gustavo Ayón	Real Madrid	25
26	(Czech Republic) Ondřej Balvín	Baloncesto Sevilla	25
26	(Belgium) Axel Hervelle	Dominion Bilbao Basket	25
26	(United States) Will Thomas (2)	Unicaja	25
27	(Serbia) Dejan Musli	ICL Manresa	32
28	(Czech Republic) Tomáš Satoranský	FC Barcelona Lassa	27
29	(United States) Darius Adams (2)	Laboral Kutxa Baskonia	33
30	(Georgia (country)) Giorgi Shermadini	MoraBanc Andorra	36
31	(Croatia) Marko Popović (2)	Montakit Fuenlabrada	30
32	(Spain) Sergio Rodriguez	Real Madrid	32
32	(United States) Darius Adams (3)	Laboral Kutxa Baskonia	32
33	(Mexico) Gustavo Ayón (2)	Real Madrid	39
34	(Spain) Sergi Vidal	FIATC Joventut	36

=== Player of the month ===
Month	Week	Player	Team	PIR	Ref
October	1–3	(Serbia) Dejan Musli	ICL Manresa	25.3	
November	4–8	(United States) Justin Hamilton	Valencia Basket	23.2	
December	9–13	(Greece) Ioannis Bourousis	Laboral Kutxa Baskonia	23.4	
January	14–18	(Greece) Ioannis Bourousis (2)	Laboral Kutxa Baskonia	24.8	
February	19–21	(Spain) Sergio Llull	Real Madrid	22.3	
March	22–25	(Slovenia) Boštjan Nachbar	Baloncesto Sevilla	21.0	
April	26–29	(Czech Republic) Tomáš Satoranský	FC Barcelona Lassa	21.3	
May	30–34	(Mexico) Gustavo Ayón	Real Madrid	28	
