= Guille Rubio =

Spanish basketball player (born 1982)

Guillermo Rubio
Personal information
- Born: October 14, 1982 (age 44) Barcelona, Spain
- Listed height: 6 ft 8 in (2.03 m)
- Listed weight: 233 lb (106 kg)

Career information
- NBA draft: 2004: undrafted
- Playing career: 2000–present
- Position: Power forward

Career history
- 1999–2000: Bàsquet Manresa
- 2000–2001: CB Vic
- 2000–2001: Bàsquet Manresa
- 2000–2003: CB Valls
- 2003–2004: CB Plasencia
- 2004–2009: Bàsquet Manresa
- 2009–2011: Unicaja
- 2011–2012: CB Sevilla
- 2012–2013: Gipuzkoa
- 2013–2014: CB Estudiantes
- 2014: CB Valladolid
- 2014–2015: Koroivos Amaliadas
- 2015–2016: VEF Rīga
- 2016–2017: Doukas
- 2017–2018: Breogán
- 2018–2020: Fundación Granada

Career highlights
- 2x LEB Oro champion (2007, 2018)
Medals
Men's basketball
Representing Spain
FIBA Europe Under-20 Championship
Silver medal – second place	2002 Lithuania	U-20 team

Guillermo "Guille" Rubio Vergara (alternate spelling: Guillem) (born October 14, 1982 in Barcelona, Spain) is a Spanish professional basketball player.

== Professional career ==
After playing 15 years in Spain, Rubio joined Koroivos Amaliadas of the Greek Basket League in 2014. He went on to average 11.3 points and 5.9 rebounds in 24 games with Koroivos. The following season, he moved to VEF Rīga, and he became the captain of the team.

On August 3, 2016, Rubio signed with Doukas of the Greek A2 League.

On July 26, 2018, Rubio signed with Covirán Granada of the LEB Oro.

== Honors ==
=== With Bàsquet Manresa ===
- LEB: (1)
  - 2006–07
