= Porfirio Fisac =

Spanish basketball coach

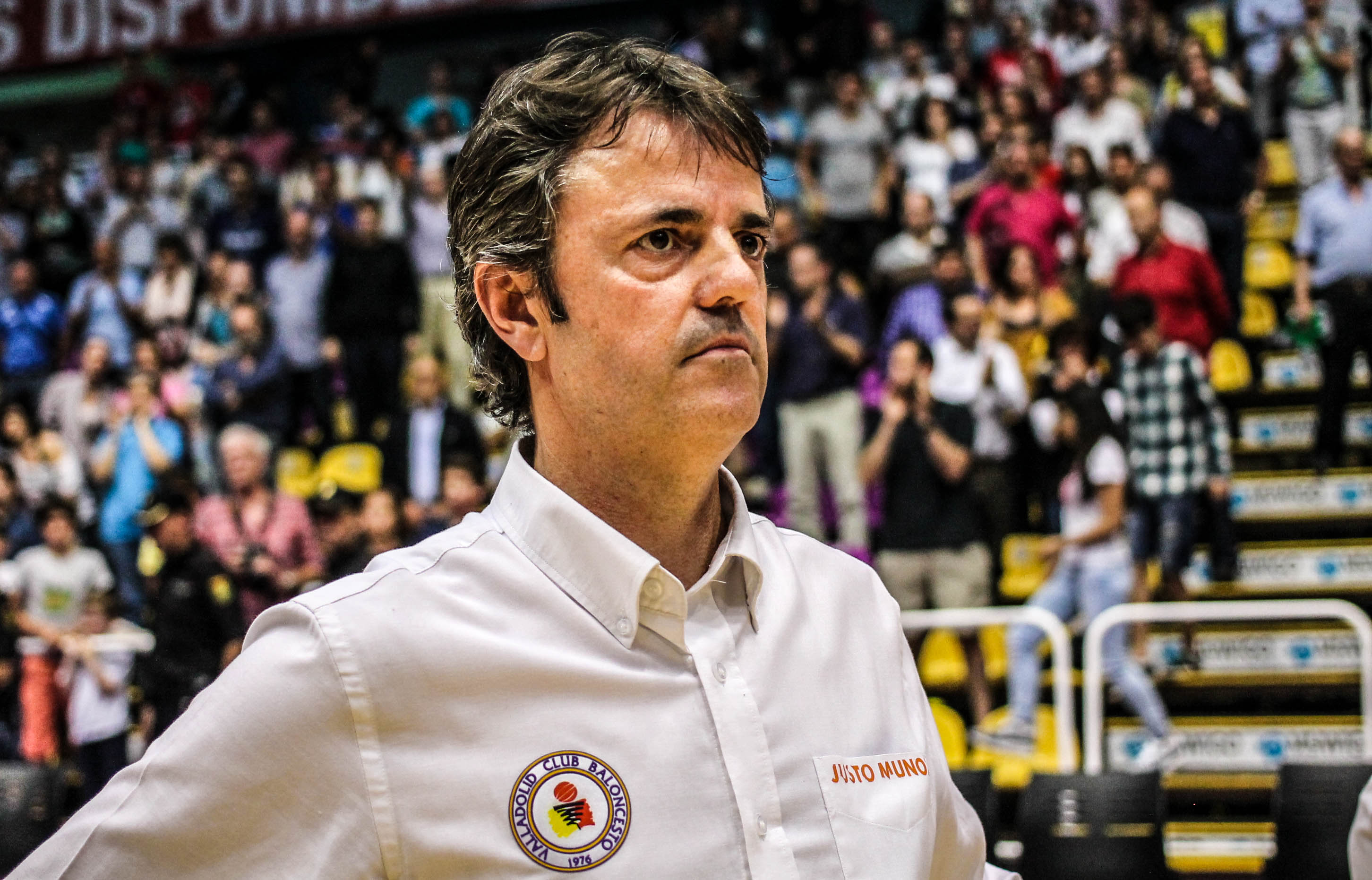

San Pablo Burgos
- Position: Head coach
- League: Liga ACB; EuroCup

Personal information
- Born: January 24, 1965 (age 61) Fuenterrebollo, Spain
- Coaching career: 1998–present

Career history

Coaching
- 1998–1999: Peñarroya
- 1999–2001: Doncel La Serena
- 2001–2002: Tarragona
- 2002–2004: Ciudad de Algeciras
- 2004–2007: Gipuzkoa
- 2008–2011: Valladolid
- 2011–2012: Fuenlabrada
- 2014–2015: Valladolid
- 2015: Palencia
- 2015–2018: Gipuzkoa
- 2016–2017: Senegal
- 2018–2020: Zaragoza
- 2020–2022: Gran Canaria
- 2022–2025: Zaragoza
- 2025–present: San Pablo Burgos

Career highlights
- As head coach: LEB Oro champion (2006, 2009, 2017)
Medals
Men's basketball
Head Coach for Senegal
AfroBasket
Bronze medal – third place	2017 Senegal/Tunisia	Team

Porfirio Fisac de Diego (born January 24, 1965) is a Spanish basketball coach who is the current head coach for San Pablo Burgos of the Liga ACB. He was the head coach of the Senegalese national team, participant at the AfroBasket 2017.

== Coaching career ==
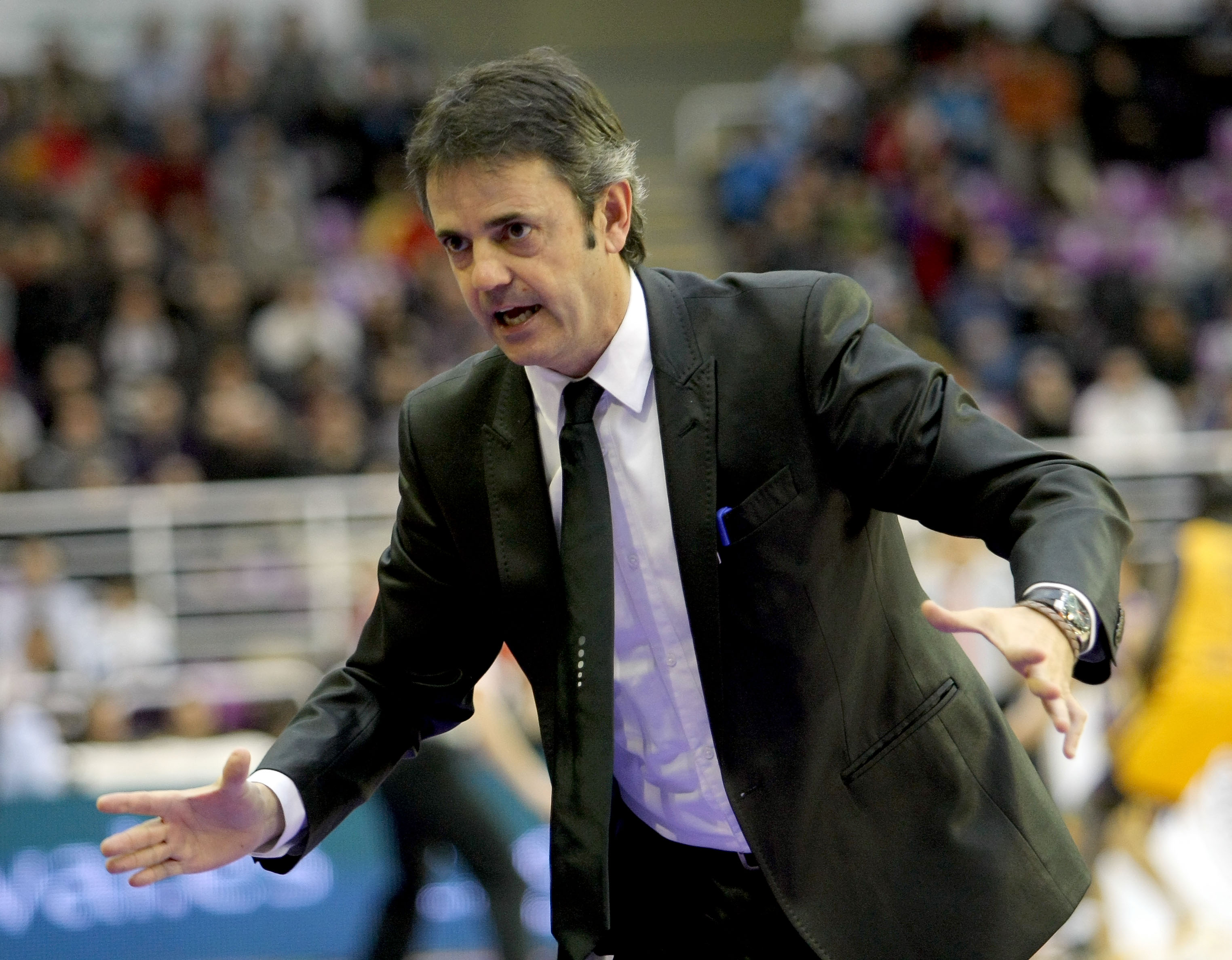
With CB Valladolid, in 2011.

Born in Fuenterrebollo, Segovia, Castile and León, the first sporting success of Fisac arrived in 2002, by promoting CB Tarragona to the LEB league. He would repeat promotion two years later with Ciudad de Algeciras.

In 2004, Fisac signed with Gipuzkoa BC, again in the LEB 2 league (third tier). In his first season, despite finishing as regular season winners, he could not achieve a new promotion due to being eliminated in the quarterfinals by CB Canarias. However, the club bought the LEB place of his former club Ciudad de Algeciras.

"I never felt so messed up for anything and I only can compare it with the death of my father."

— Porfirio Fisac, after the relegation of GBC.

In the club's debut season in LEB, despite finishing the regular season in the sixth position, Gipuzkoa BC completed a perfect playoff with seven wins and no defeats and promoted to the Liga ACB. In the next season, he could not avoid the last position and ended his stage at Gipuzkoa. Fisac compared the relegation of the club with the death of his father.

After one season without coaching, Fisac took the helm of freshly relegated from Liga ACB CB Valladolid and achieved the promotion in his first season, and qualified the team to the Copa del Rey in 2011. He ended the contract in that year and signed with Baloncesto Fuenlabrada, where he was sacked.

Two years later, he came back to Valladolid, for coaching the club in their last season before relegation and in 2015, after starting the season with Palencia Baloncesto, he left the team as leader of the LEB Oro with a 9–1 record for agreeing terms with Gipuzkoa Basket. Fisac could not avoid finally their relegation, but he achieved a third promotion to Liga ACB in the next season.

In March 2016, Fisac was hired as manager of the Senegal national team. After coaching the team in the Olympic Qualifying Tournament of Manila, he extended his contract for the AfroBasket 2017, where he led the hosts to the bronze medal.

On 30 May 2018, despite avoiding successfully the relegation from Liga ACB, Fisac resigned to continue at the helm of GBC. He alleged he feels he "completed the cycle".

Two weeks later, Fisac signed a two-year contract with Tecnyconta Zaragoza.

On July 8, 2020, he signed with Gran Canaria of the Liga ACB.

On December 8, 2025, he signed with San Pablo Burgos of the Liga ACB.
