= 2000–01 LEB 2 season =

- League: LEB 2
- Sport: Basketball
- Number of games: 240 (regular season)
- Number of teams: 16
- Season champions: CB Cornellà
- Season MVP: (United States) Rahshon Turner

LEB 2 seasons
- 2001–02 →

The 2000-01 LEB 2 season was the first season of the LEB 2, second league of the Liga Española de Baloncesto and third division in Spain.

== Competition format ==
16 teams play the regular season. This is a round robin, where each team will play twice against every rival. After the regular season, the eight first qualified teams played a playoff, were the two finalists promoted to LEB.

The last qualified team was relegated to Liga EBA, with the loser of the relegation playoffs, played by the 16th and the 17th qualified teams.

If two or more teams have got the same number of winning games, the criteria of tie-breaking are these:

1. Head-to-head winning games.
2. Head-to-head points difference.
3. Total points difference.

== Regular season ==
=== League table ===
#	Teams	GP	W	L	PF	PA	PT	Qualification or relegation
1	CB Tarragona	30	21	9	2521	2357	51	Promotion playoffs
2	CD Universidad Complutense	30	20	10	2607	2435	50	Promotion playoffs
3	UB La Palma	30	20	10	2659	2431	50	Promotion playoffs
4	Llobregat Centre Cornellà	30	19	11	2445	2371	49	Promotion playoffs
5	CB Ciudad de Algeciras	30	19	11	2763	2727	49	Promotion playoffs
6	Redcom Airtel Porriño	30	17	13	2478	2464	47	Promotion playoffs
7	Plaza Mayor Gandía	30	17	13	2551	2551	47	Promotion playoffs
8	Calpe Aguas de Calpe	30	17	13	2393	2280	47	Promotion playoffs
9	CB Plasencia	30	16	14	2602	2486	46	
10	CB Linense	30	14	16	2363	2486	44	
11	Ejido Beach Podeprom	30	12	18	2329	2462	42	
12	Rayet Guadalajara	30	12	18	2526	2578	42	
13	Basket Bilbao Berri	30	10	20	2331	2453	40	Relegation playoffs
14	Cafés Aitona Askatuak	30	9	21	2314	2455	39	Relegation playoffs
15	Doncel Distributel	30	9	21	2321	2442	39	Relegation playoffs
16	Baloncesto Alcalá	30	8	22	2379	2604	38	Relegation playoffs

== Promotion playoffs ==
Quarter Finals
1	CB Tarragona	3
8	Aguas de Calpe	2
4	Llobregat Centre	3
5	CBC Algeciras	1
2	Univ Complutense	3
7	Plaza Mayor Gandía	1
3	UB La Palma	3
6	Redcom Porriño	0

SemiFinals
1	CB Tarragona	2
4	Llobregat Centre	3
2	Univ Complutense	3
3	UB La Palma	2

Finals
2	Univ Complutense	87+69
4	Llobregat Centre	76+90

== Relegation playoffs ==
Finals
13	Basket Bilbao Berri	3
16	Baloncesto Alcalá	0

Finals
14	Cafés Aitona	3
15	Doncel Distributel	2

== MVP of the regular season ==
- (United States) Rahshon Turner (UB La Palma)
