= Thomas Terrell (basketball) =

American professional basketball player

Personal information
- Born: September 5, 1979 (age 47)
- Listed height: 6 ft 7 in (2.01 m)
- Listed weight: 240 lb (109 kg)

Career information
- High school: Brookhaven (Brookhaven, Mississippi)
- College: Copiah–Lincoln CC (1998–2000); Georgia State (2000–2002)
- NBA draft: 2002: undrafted
- Playing career: 2002–2013
- Position: Power forward

Career history
- 2002: Florida Sea Dragons
- 2002–2003: Gallos de Pelea
- 2003: Power Wevelgem
- 2003–2004: Ciudad de Huelva
- 2004–2007: CB L'Hospitalet
- 2007–2008: Basquet Inca
- 2008: Palma Aqua Magica
- 2008–2009: UB La Palma
- 2009–2010: Hyères-Toulon
- 2010–2011: Elitzur Ashkelon
- 2011: Saint-Vallier Basket Drôme
- 2011–2012: Hyères-Toulon
- 2011–2012: Peñarol Mar del Plata

Career highlights
- Atlantic Sun Player of the Year (2002); First-team All-Atlantic Sun (2002)

Thomas Terrell Jr. (born September 5, 1979) is an American retired professional basketball player.

== Early life ==
Terrell grew up in Bogue Chitto, Mississippi, the son of Thomas Terrell Sr. and Barbara Hurst. He began playing basketball at the age of two. Terrell's father, a logger and mechanic, was killed in an accident in June 1993, with his body lodged under a car. Terrell attended Brookhaven High School and was cut by the basketball team as a sophomore. As a junior, he had grown to 6'5 and he rejoined the varsity squad. Terrell averaged 18 points and 11 rebounds per game as a senior, but a poor score on the ACT disqualified him from most colleges.

== College career ==
Terrell played two seasons at Copiah–Lincoln Community College before transferring to Georgia State to play under Lefty Driesell. He helped the Panthers post a 29–5 record and reach the NCAA Tournament as a junior while averaging 16.4 points and 7.5 rebounds per game. He scored 42 points in a game against Jacksonville. Terrell helped the team earn a berth to the NIT in his senior season. Terrell averaged 20.5 points per game as a senior and was named Atlantic Sun Player of the Year. In two seasons at Georgia state, he recorded 1,193 points and 177 three-pointers.

== Professional career ==
Terrell was selected eighth overall in the 2002 USBL draft by the Florida Sea Dragons. He had a brief stint with Gallos de Pelea in Mexico. In 2003, Terrell joined Power Wevelgem but leaft the team after 14 days, subsequently signing with Ciudad de Huelva. From 2004 to 2007, he played for CB L'Hospitalet of the LEB Oro. He was named league MVP twice after averaging 22.9 points per game in his first season and 19.2 points per game in his second. In 2006, Terrell was slowed by a knee injury. His No. 5 jersey was hung from the rafters at Georgia State in 2007.

In the 2007–08 season, Terrell joined Basquet Inca and played until the end of the first round. He signed with Palma Aqua Magica for the rest of the season. Terrell joined UB La Palma in August 2008. He averaged 17.1 points, 6.5 rebounds, 1.5 steals and 1.4 assists per game in the 2007–08 season, earning LEB Oro MVP honors. In July 2009, Terrell signed with Hyères-Toulon of the French League.

During the 2011–2012 season, Terrell rejoined Hyères-Toulon. He averaged 8.9 points, 3.7 rebounds and 1.3 assists per game. In September 2012, Terrell signed with Peñarol Mar del Plata of the Argentine Liga Nacional de Básquet.
