= 2004–05 LEB 2 season =

2005–06 LEB 2 season
- League: LEB 2
- Sport: Basketball
- Number of games: 240 (regular season)
- Number of teams: 16
- Season champions: CB L'Hospitalet
- Season MVP: (United States) Thomas Terrell

LEB 2 seasons
- ← 2003–04 2005–06 →

The 2004–05 LEB 2 season was the 5th season of the LEB Plata, second league of the Liga Española de Baloncesto and third division in Spain.

== Competition format ==
16 teams play the regular season. This is a round robin, where each team will play twice against every rival. After the regular season, the eight first qualified teams played a playoff, were the two finalists promoted to LEB.

The last qualified team was relegated to Liga EBA, with the loser of the relegation playoffs, played by the 14th and the 15th qualified teams.

If two or more teams have got the same number of winning games, the criteria of tie-breaking are these:

1. Head-to-head winning games.
2. Head-to-head points difference.
3. Total points difference.

== Regular season ==
=== League table ===
| # | Teams | GP | W | L | PF | PA | PT | Qualification or relegation |
|---|---|---|---|---|---|---|---|---|
| 1 | Autocid Ford Burgos | 30 | 24 | 6 | 2590 | 2290 | 54 | Promotion playoffs |
| 2 | Bruesa GBC | 30 | 21 | 9 | 2552 | 2341 | 51 | Promotion playoffs |
| 3 | Drac Inca | 30 | 21 | 9 | 2581 | 2309 | 51 | Promotion playoffs |
| 4 | Pozuelo CB | 30 | 20 | 10 | 2439 | 2229 | 50 | Promotion playoffs |
| 5 | Alcúdia-Aracena | 30 | 20 | 10 | 2398 | 2208 | 50 | Promotion playoffs |
| 6 | CB L'Hospitalet | 30 | 20 | 10 | 2579 | 2401 | 50 | Promotion playoffs |
| 7 | Ciudad de La Laguna | 30 | 19 | 11 | 2430 | 2392 | 49 | Promotion playoffs |
| 8 | Celso Míguez Procolor | 30 | 15 | 15 | 2374 | 2432 | 45 | Promotion playoffs |
| 9 | WTC Cornellà | 30 | 14 | 16 | 2435 | 2448 | 44 | |
| 10 | Imaje Sabadell Gapsa | 30 | 13 | 17 | 2325 | 2365 | 43 | |
| 11 | CajaRioja | 30 | 13 | 17 | 2261 | 2305 | 43 | |
| 12 | Pamesa Castellón | 30 | 12 | 18 | 2446 | 2601 | 42 | |
| 13 | Aguas de Valencia Expobar | 30 | 11 | 19 | 2391 | 2426 | 41 | |
| 14 | Rayet Guadalajara | 30 | 9 | 21 | 2356 | 2534 | 39 | Relegation playoffs |
| 15 | CI Rosalía de Castro | 30 | 7 | 23 | 2286 | 2530 | 37 | Relegation playoffs |
| 16 | Doncel La Serena | 30 | 1 | 29 | 2213 | 2845 | 31 | Relegation to Liga EBA |

== Promotion playoffs ==
Quarter Finals
1 | Autocid Ford Burgos | 3
8 | Celso Míguez | 2
4 | Pozuelo CB | 1
5 | Alcúdia-Aracena | 3
2 | Bruesa GBC | 2
7 | Ciudad de La Laguna | 3
3 | Drac Inca | 0
6 | CB L'Hospitalet | 3

SemiFinals
1 | Autocid Ford Burgos | 0
5 | Alcúdia-Aracena | 3
6 | CB L'Hospitalet | 3
7 | Ciudad de La Laguna | 0

Finals
5 | Alcúdia-Aracena | 74
6 | CB L'Hospitalet | 78

== Relegation playoffs ==
| Finals |
| 14 | Rayet Guadalajara | 2 |
| 15 | CI Rosalía de Castro | 3 |

== MVP of the regular season ==
- (United States) Thomas Terrell (CB L'Hospitalet)
