= Copa Andalucía =

The Copa Andalucía is played with the ACB teams of Andalusia and sometimes Andalusian LEB teams. It is organized by the Andalusian Basketball Federation since 1997.

== Finals ==
Year	Host	Winner	Runner-up	Score
1997	Málaga	Unicaja	Caja San Fernando	85–81
1998	Valverde	Caja San Fernando	Unicaja	96–95
1999	Córdoba	Caja San Fernando	Unicaja	59–54
2000	Granada	CB Granada	Unicaja	89–88
2001	Granada	Unicaja	Caja San Fernando	95–86
2002	Trebujena	Caja San Fernando	CB Los Barrios	90–81
2003	Huelva	Unicaja	Caja San Fernando	75–71
2004	Sevilla	CB Granada	Unicaja	85–81
2005	Vera	Caja San Fernando	Unicaja	92–84
2006	Frigiliana	CB Granada	CB Villa de Los Barrios	89–72
2007	Linares	Unicaja	Cajasol	MAL 70–62 GRA; MAL 71–66 SEV; SEV 74–47 GRA
2008	Aljaraque	Unicaja	CB Granada	MAL 65–50 GRA; SEV 64–97 GRA; MAL 86–68 SEV
2009	Puerto Real	Cajasol	CB Granada	GRA 83–79 SEV; GRA 84–71 SEV; MAL 73–79 SEV
2010	Puente Genil	Unicaja	Cajasol Banca Cívica	GRA 76–85 MAL; MAL 82–66 SEV; SEV 80–70 GRA
2011	Sevilla, Málaga	Unicaja	Banca Cívica	SEV 80–80 MAL; MAL 91–59 SEV
2012	Córdoba	Unicaja	Cajasol	65–53
2013	Not played			
2014	Benahavís	Unicaja	Baloncesto Sevilla	77–74
2015	Alcalá de Guadaira	Unicaja	Baloncesto Sevilla	77–62
2016	Benahavís	Unicaja	Real Betis Energía Plus	87–75
2017	Morón de la Frontera	Unicaja	Real Betis Energía Plus	86–76
2018	Alhaurín de la Torre	Unicaja	Real Betis Energía Plus	102–65
2024	Córdoba	Unicaja	Covirán Granada	80–77

=== Titles ===
Team	Winners	Runners-up	Winning years
Unicaja	14	5	1997, 2001, 2003, 2007, 2008, 2010, 2011, 2012, 2014, 2015, 2016, 2017, 2018, 2024
Real Betis Baloncesto	5	12	1998, 1999, 2002, 2005, 2009
CB Granada	3	3	2000, 2004, 2006
CB Villa de Los Barrios	0	2	

== Editions with more than one round ==
=== 2001 ===
Cajasur Córdoba joined the competition as the Andalusian representative in the LEB league.

Semi-finals
Unicaja
Cajasur Córdoba
Caja San Fernando	91
CB Granada	50

Final
Unicaja	95
Caja San Fernando	89
Third place
CB Granada	77
Cajasur Córdoba	75

=== 2002 ===
CB Los Barrios joined the semifinals as champion of the II Copa Andalucía LEB.

Semi-finals
Unicaja	79
CB Los Barrios	85
Caja San Fernando	65
CB Granada	58

Final
CB Los Barrios	81
Caja San Fernando	90
Third place
Unicaja	79
CB Granada	83

=== 2003 ===
Algeciras Cepsa and CB Ciudad de Huelva, LEB 2 and LEB team respectively, joined the semifinals with the two ACB teams.

Semi-finals
Caja San Fernando	81
CB Ciudad de Huelva	62
Unicaja	84
Algeciras Cepsa	74

Final
Caja San Fernando	92
Unicaja	84

=== 2004 ===
Algeciras Cepsa repeated in the semifinals as champion of the Copa Andalucía played by teams from LEB league.

Semi-finals
Caja San Fernando	70
CB Granada	79
Unicaja	92
Algeciras Cepsa	74

Final
CB Granada	85
Unicaja	81

=== 2005 ===
CB Ciudad de Huelva joined the semifinals as champion of the Copa Andalucía played by teams from LEB league.

Semi-finals
Caja San Fernando	127
CB Granada	117
Unicaja	102
CB Ciudad de Huelva	69

Final
Caja San Fernando	92
CB Granada	84

=== 2006 ===
In this edition of the Cup, CB Villa de Los Barrios joined the semifinals as champion of the Copa Andalucía played by teams from LEB league.

Semi-finals
Caja San Fernando	83
CB Granada	89
Unicaja	72
CB Villa de Los Barrios	79

Final
CB Granada	89
CB Villa de Los Barrios	72
Third place
Caja San Fernando	78
Unicaja	69

=== 2018 ===
Unicaja, the only ACB team, qualified directly for the final against the winner of the two LEB Oro teams.

Semi-finals
Real Betis Energía Plus	94	79	173
Covirán Granada	79	71	150

Final
Unicaja	102
Real Betis Energía Plus	65
