= 2002–03 LEB 2 season =

- League: LEB 2
- Sport: Basketball
- Number of games: 240 (regular season)
- Number of teams: 16
- Season champions: CB Aracena
- Season MVP: (United States) John Schuck

LEB 2 seasons
- ← 2001–02 2003–04 →

The 2002–03 LEB 2 season was the 3rd season of the LEB Plata, second league of the Liga Española de Baloncesto and third division in Spain.

== Competition format ==
16 teams play during the regular season. It is a round robin tournament, where each team will play against every rival twice. After the regular season, the eight top ranked teams play in the playoffs, were the two finalists are promoted to LEB.

The last qualified team was relegated to Liga EBA, with the loser of the relegation playoffs, played by the 16th and the 17th qualified teams.

If two or more teams have got the same number of winning games, the criteria of tie-breaking are these:

1. Head-to-head winning games.
2. Head-to-head points difference.
3. Total points difference.

== Regular season ==
=== League table ===
| # | Teams | GP | W | L | PF | PA | PT | Qualification or relegation |
|---|---|---|---|---|---|---|---|---|
| 1 | CB Plasencia | 30 | 21 | 9 | 2470 | 2270 | 51 | Promotion playoffs |
| 2 | CB Galicia | 30 | 21 | 9 | 2452 | 2337 | 51 | Promotion playoffs |
| 3 | UB La Palma | 30 | 21 | 9 | 2268 | 2129 | 51 | Promotion playoffs |
| 4 | CB Aracena | 30 | 20 | 10 | 2477 | 2281 | 50 | Promotion playoffs |
| 5 | Aguas de Valencia Gandía | 30 | 17 | 13 | 2378 | 2292 | 47 | Promotion playoffs |
| 6 | CBC Algeciras Cepsa | 30 | 17 | 13 | 2435 | 2371 | 47 | Promotion playoffs |
| 7 | Baloncesto Porriño | 30 | 16 | 14 | 2397 | 2388 | 46 | Promotion playoffs |
| 8 | WTC Almeda Park Cornellà | 30 | 15 | 15 | 2259 | 2222 | 45 | Promotion playoffs |
| 9 | Valls Félix Hotel | 30 | 15 | 15 | 2433 | 2374 | 45 | |
| 10 | Ciudad de La Laguna | 30 | 13 | 17 | 2210 | 2341 | 43 | |
| 11 | Calpe Aguas de Calpe | 30 | 13 | 17 | 2302 | 2342 | 43 | |
| 12 | Círculo Badajoz | 30 | 12 | 18 | 2197 | 2350 | 42 | |
| 13 | Rayet Guadalajara | 30 | 12 | 18 | 2280 | 2374 | 42 | |
| 14 | Autocid Ford Burgos | 30 | 11 | 19 | 2425 | 2451 | 41 | Relegation playoffs |
| 15 | Cerámica Leoni Castelló | 30 | 10 | 20 | 2353 | 2477 | 40 | Relegation playoffs |
| 16 | El Ejido CB | 30 | 6 | 24 | 2104 | 2441 | 36 | Relegation to Liga EBA |

== Promotion playoffs ==
Quarter Finals
1 | CB Plasencia | 3
8 | WTC Cornellà | 2
4 | CB Aracena | 3
5 | Aguas de Valencia | 1
2 | CB Galicia | 3
7 | Baloncesto Porriño | 0
3 | UB La Palma | 0
6 | CBC Algeciras Cepsa | 3

SemiFinals
1 | CB Plasencia | 1
4 | CB Aracena | 3
2 | CB Galicia | 0
6 | CBC Algeciras Cepsa | 3

Finals
4 | CB Aracena | 80
6 | CBC Algeciras Cepsa | 70

== Relegation playoffs ==
| Finals |
| 14 | Autocid Ford Burgos | 1 |
| 15 | Cerámica Leoni | 3 |

== MVP of the regular season ==
- (United States) John Schuck
