= Rafa Martínez =

Spanish basketball player

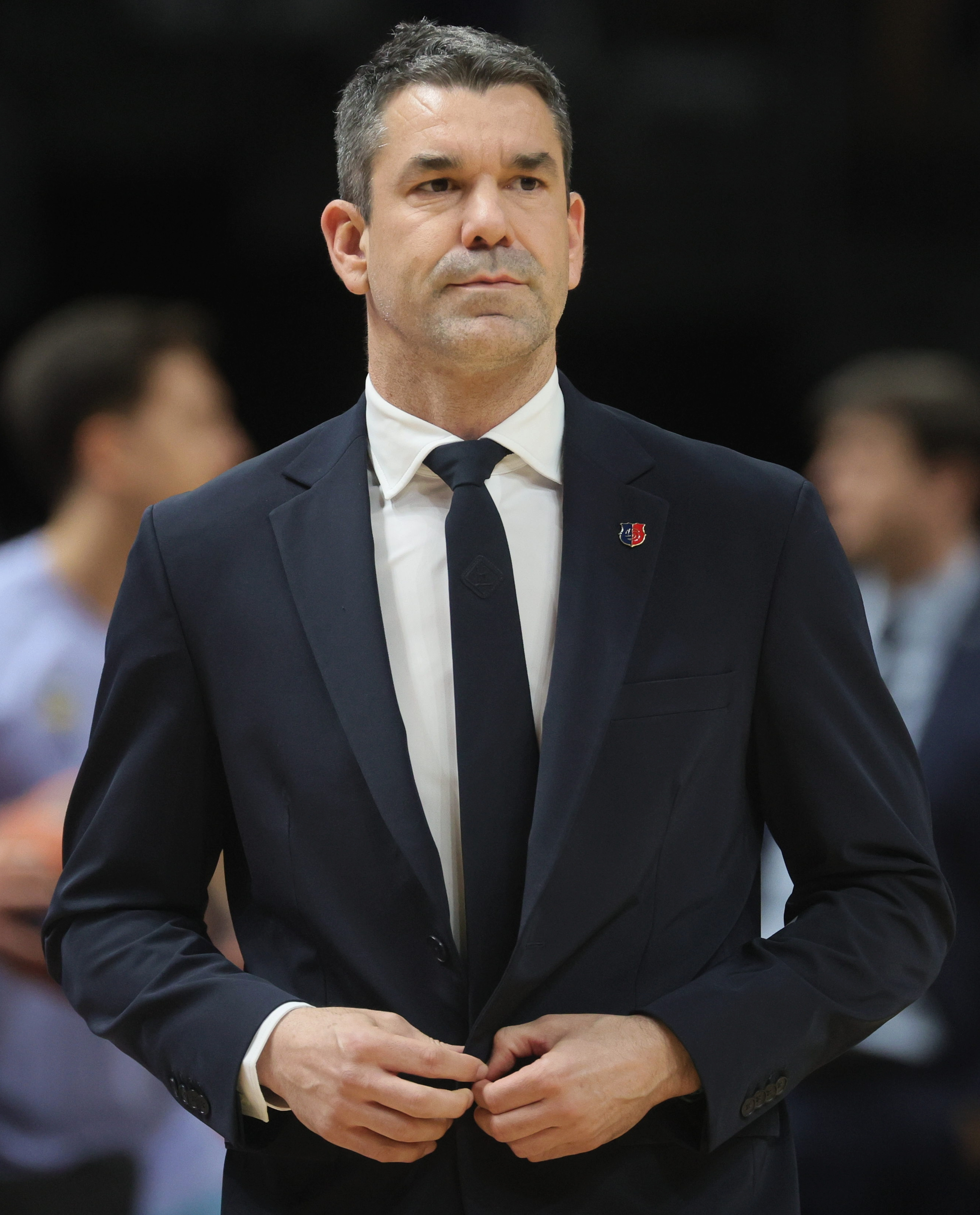
- Rafael Martínez with FC Barcelona in 2025

FC Barcelona
- Title: Assistant coach
- League: Liga ACB; EuroLeague

Personal information
- Born: 3 March 1982 (age 44) Santpedor, Spain
- Listed height: 6 ft 2.75 in (1.90 m)
- Listed weight: 180 lb (82 kg)

Career information
- NBA draft: 2004: undrafted
- Playing career: 1999–2022
- Position: Shooting guard

Career history
- 1998–2000: Manresa
- 2000–2001: Vic
- 2001–2003: Valls
- 2003–2008: Manresa
- 2008–2019: Valencia
- 2019–2020: Bilbao
- 2020–2022: Manresa

Career highlights
- 3× EuroCup champion (2010, 2014, 2019); Liga ACB champion (2017); 3× Liga ACB three-point field goal percentage leader (2010, 2017–2018); Liga LEB champion (2007)
Medals
Men's basketball
Representing Spain
Mediterranean Games
Bronze medal – third place	2005 Almería	National team

Rafael Martínez Aguilera (born 3 March 1982), known as Rafa Martínez, is a Spanish former professional basketball player, spending most of his career in Bàsquet Manresa and Valencia Basket of the Liga ACB. He also represented the Spain national team internationally. He played the shooting guard position. Martínez is currently a player development coach for FC Barcelona.

== Professional career ==
Rafa Martínez started playing basketball for Basquet Manresa eventually rising from the club's junior team ranks. The team previously played in the Spanish second division LEB but was promoted to the ACB for the 1999–2000 season where on October 9, 1999, he made his professional debut in the top Spanish league against FC Barcelona. The following season he spent in the Basketball team CB Vic. After spending two years in the Valls Felix Hotel in LEB-2, he returned to the Basquet Manresa in 2003.

In 2008, Martínez joined Valencia Basket. He won the EuroCup in the 2009–10. Along with that, Martínez had the highest three-point percentage in the Liga ACB that season. In the 2013–14 season, he won the Eurocup for the second time.

On 14 March 2017 Martínez became the all-time three-point field goals leader of the EuroCup after passing Marko Popović with 208 three-pointers.

First all-time leader in scoring of Valencia Basket since 26 February 2019 in the match against San Pablo Burgos team, surpassing Brad Branson.

On July 10, 2019, Martínez signed with RETAbet Bilbao Basket of the Liga ACB.

On July 8, 2020, Martínez had signed with Baxi Manresa of the Liga ACB. On July 15, 2021, Baxi Manresa announced that Martínez would play one more season for the club. Martínez retired from professional basketball at the end of the 2021-22 ACB season, having played more than 600 games in the league.

== Spain national team ==
He has been with the Spain national team from the youth level. With the U-20 he won the silver medal at the U-20 European Basketball Championship 2002 played in Vilnius (Lithuania), and won the bronze medal with the B-team at the Mediterranean Games 2005 played in Almería (Spain).

In June 2010 he was included on the list of 24 candidates for the Spain national team, but did not make the final 12-man roster for 2010 FIBA World Championship.

== Career statistics ==
Legend
GP	Games played	GS	Games started	MPG	Minutes per game
FG%	Field-goal percentage	3P%	3-point field-goal percentage	FT%	Free-throw percentage
RPG	Rebounds per game	APG	Assists per game	SPG	Steals per game
BPG	Blocks per game	PPG	Points per game	PIR	Performance index rating
**Bold**	Career high

=== EuroLeague ===
Year	Team	GP	GS	MPG	FG%	3P%	FT%	RPG	APG	SPG	BPG	PPG	PIR
2010–11	Valencia Basket	21	21	29.0	.416	.375	.769	2.1	1.5	.8	.0	10.7	8.4
2014–15	Valencia	10	6	13.1	.242	.136	.714	.8	.7	.5	.0	2.4	1.0
**Career**		31	27	23.9	.388	.331	.763	1.7	1.3	.7	.0	8.0	6.0
