= 2001–02 LEB 2 season =

- League: LEB 2
- Sport: Basketball
- Number of games: 240 (regular season)
- Number of teams: 16
- Season champions: Basket Bilbao Berri
- Season MVP: (United States) Melvin Simon

LEB 2 seasons
- ← 2000–01 2002–03 →

The 2001–02 LEB 2 season was the 2nd season of the LEB 2, second league of the Liga Española de Baloncesto and third division in Spain.

== Competition format ==
16 teams play the regular season. This is a round robin, where each team will play twice against every rival. After the regular season, the eight first qualified teams played a playoff, were the two finalists promoted to LEB.

The last qualified team was relegated to Liga EBA, with the loser of the relegation playoffs, played by the 16th and the 17th qualified teams.

If two or more teams have got the same number of winning games, the criteria of tie-breaking are these:

1. Head-to-head winning games.
2. Head-to-head points difference.
3. Total points difference.

== Regular season ==
=== League table ===
#	Teams	GP	W	L	PF	PA	PT	Qualification or relegation
1	Basket Bilbao Berri	30	23	7	2648	2416	53	Promotion playoffs
2	CB Tarragona	30	22	8	2426	2254	52	Promotion playoffs
3	Aguas de Valencia Gandía	30	19	11	2588	2466	49	Promotion playoffs
4	UB La Palma	30	18	12	2465	2389	48	Promotion playoffs
5	Calpe Aguas de Calpe	30	18	12	2387	2282	48	Promotion playoffs
6	Valls Felix Hotel	30	17	13	2421	2387	47	Promotion playoffs
7	Baloncesto Porriño	30	16	14	2525	2472	46	Promotion playoffs
8	Rayet Guadalajara	30	16	14	2575	2512	46	Promotion playoffs
9	Plasencia Galco	30	15	15	2513	2479	45	
10	Badajoz Caja Rural	30	14	16	2380	2313	44	
11	Datac GBC	30	13	17	2415	2432	43	
12	UDA Gramenet Condis	30	13	17	2351	2427	43	
13	El Ejido CB	30	12	18	2380	2428	42	Relegation playoffs
14	Doncel La Serena	30	10	20	2438	2689	40	Relegation playoffs
15	CB Ciudad de Algeciras	30	8	22	2443	2654	38	Relegation playoffs
16	Grupo AZ Ferrol	30	6	24	2461	2816	36	Relegation playoffs

== Promotion playoffs ==
Quarter Finals
1	Basket Bilbao Berri	3
8	Rayet Guadalajara	0
4	UB La Palma	3
5	Calpe Aguas	2
2	CB Tarragona	3
7	Baloncesto Porriño	0
3	Aguas de Valencia	3
6	Valls Félix Hotel	0

SemiFinals
1	Basket Bilbao Berri	3
4	UB La Palma	1
2	CB Tarragona	3
3	Aguas de Valencia	2

Finals
1	Basket Bilbao Berri	92+94
2	CB Tarragona	87+91

== Relegation playoffs ==
Finals
13	El Ejido CB	3
16	Grupo AZ Ferrol	2

Finals
14	Doncel La Serena	0
15	CBC Algeciras	3

== MVP of the regular season ==
- (United States) Melvin Simon
