= Gipuzkoa Basket =

Inveready Askatuak Gipuzkoa
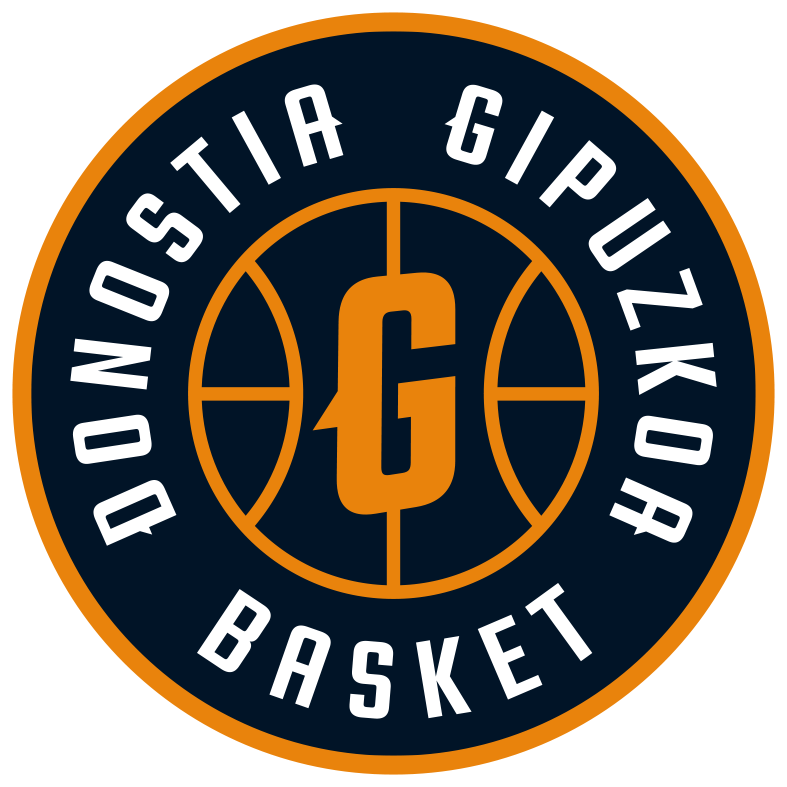
- Leagues: Primera FEB
- Founded: 2001; 25 years ago
- History: Gipuzkoa Basket (2001–2006); Donosti Gipuzkoa Basket 2001 (2006–2026); Askatuak Gipuzkoa (2026–present)
- Arena: Donostia Arena
- Capacity: 11,000
- Location: San Sebastián, Gipuzkoa, Spain
- Team colors: Blue, orange, white
- Main sponsor: Inveready
- President: Nacho Núñez
- Head coach: Sergio García
- Website: Official website
Home	Away

Donosti Gipuzkoa Basket 2001 Saskibaloi Kirol Elkartea S.A.D., commonly known as Gipuzkoa Basket and as Inveready Askatuak Gipuzkoa for sponsorship reasons, is a Spanish professional basketball club based in San Sebastián, Gipuzkoa, Spain. The team plays in the Primera FEB, the second tier. They play their home games in the Donostia Arena.

== History ==
Gipuzkoa Basket started competing in LEB 2, third tier. After a first season where the club finished in 11th position out of sixteen teams, it ceased in activity until 2004, when it came back to LEB 2.

In the 2004–05 LEB 2 season, despite finishing in the second position of the regular season, Gipuzkoa BC was eliminated in the quarterfinals of the promotion playoffs by Ciudad de La Laguna. After this come back to competition, Gipuzkoa BC bought the place in Liga LEB, second tier, to CB Ciudad de Algeciras.

Bruesa GBC only needed one season in LEB to achieve promotion Liga ACB. The team finished the regular season in the sixth position but performed a perfect playoff (7–0) to win the league.

The 2006–07 ACB season was not good for the club and could not remain in the league after only winning eight of the 34 games. Porfirio Fisac finished his era in the club after two consecutive promotions.

Despite this failure, Bruesa GBC, this time with Pablo Laso as coach, obtained again the promotion after beating Tenerife Rural in the final game by 81–76 in Cáceres.

The second era in Liga ACB was much better, and the club had not too much problems to remain in the league. The 2011–12 season, just after Pablo Laso signed with Real Madrid, would be the best one in the history of the club, qualifying for the first time to play the Copa del Rey, where the team was defeated in the quarterfinals by Caja Laboral, and the playoffs, not being able to beat Valencia Basket.

A drastic cut in the public subvention to the club, forced Gipuzkoa to resign to play in the Eurocup. From 2012 to 2016 the club decreased its performances and was relegated to LEB Oro in three of the following four seasons, but remained in the league due to the not ability of the second-tier teams to fulfill the requirements to join the ACB League.

In July 2016, after its third relegation and only winning seven games of the 2015–16 season, the board of directors agreed to register GBC in the LEB Oro, thus rejecting the invitation to play again in Liga ACB. With this decision, GBC came back to its old pavilion Polideportivo Municipal José Antonio Gasca, instead of playing again at Illumbe bullring. In its third season at LEB Oro, it achieved a third promotion to the top tier after ending as league champions.

Two years after promoting, GBC suffered a new relegation to LEB Oro. In its fourth season, the club achieved its first Copa Princesa de Asturias after three participations, by beating away Carramimbre CBC Valladolid.

== Sponsorship naming ==
Gipuzkoa Basket has had several denominations through the years due to its sponsorship:

- Datac GBC (2001–02)
- Bruesa GBC (2004–09)
- Lagun Aro GBC (2009–13)
- RETAbet.es GBC (2015–2017)
- Delteco GBC (2017–2019)
- Delteco Gipuzkoa Basket (2019–2020)
- Acunsa GBC (2020–present)

== Home arenas ==
- José Antonio Gasca (2001–06, 2016–2017, 2019–2020)
- Donostia Arena (2006–2016, 2017–2019, 2020–present)

== Players ==
=== Current roster ===
Note: Flags indicate national team eligibility at FIBA-sanctioned events. Players may hold other non-FIBA nationalities not displayed.

Gipuzkoa Basket roster
Players
Coaches

Pos.	No.	Nat.	Name	Ht.	Age
SF	2	(Czech Republic)	Hanzlík, Ondřej	2.00 m (6 ft 7 in)	24 – 2 March 2002
PG	7	(Spain)	Aizpitarte, Ierai	1.83 m (6 ft 0 in)	26 – 8 September 2000
SF	8	(Denmark)	Stürup, Mads Bonde	1.97 m (6 ft 6 in)	29 – 24 May 1997
PG	10	(Spain) (Uruguay)	Capalbo, Lucas	1.77 m (5 ft 10 in)	26 – 22 March 2000
PG	11	(Spain)	Maiza, Gaizka	1.91 m (6 ft 3 in)	30 – 14 June 1996
PF	12	(Spain)	Domènech, Adrià	2.10 m (6 ft 11 in)	24 – 18 July 2002
SG	13	(France)	Falcoz, Corentin	1.93 m (6 ft 4 in)	23 – 5 November 2002
F	15	(Senegal) (United States)	Lo, Omar	2.06 m (6 ft 9 in)	29 – 1 July 1997
C	21	(United States)	Van Komen, Matt	2.23 m (7 ft 4 in)	26 – 24 August 2000
SG	44	(Puerto Rico)	Vázquez, Brian	1.90 m (6 ft 3 in)	32 – 8 September 1994
C	55	(Lithuania)	Paukštė, Jonas	2.24 m (7 ft 4 in)	26 – 10 September 2000

Head coach

- (Spain) Sergio García

Legend

- (C) Team captain
- Injured

- Roster
Updated: September 23, 2026

=== Depth chart ===
Pos.	Starting 5	Bench 1	Bench 2
C	Matt Van Komen	Jonas Paukštė
PF	Adrià Domènech	Omar Lo
SF	Ondřej Hanzlík	Mads Bonde Stürup
SG	Corentin Falcoz	Brian Vázquez
PG	Gaizka Maiza	Lucas Capalbo	Ierai Aizpitarte

Colours: Blue = homegrown player; Red = non–FIBA Europe player

== Coaches ==
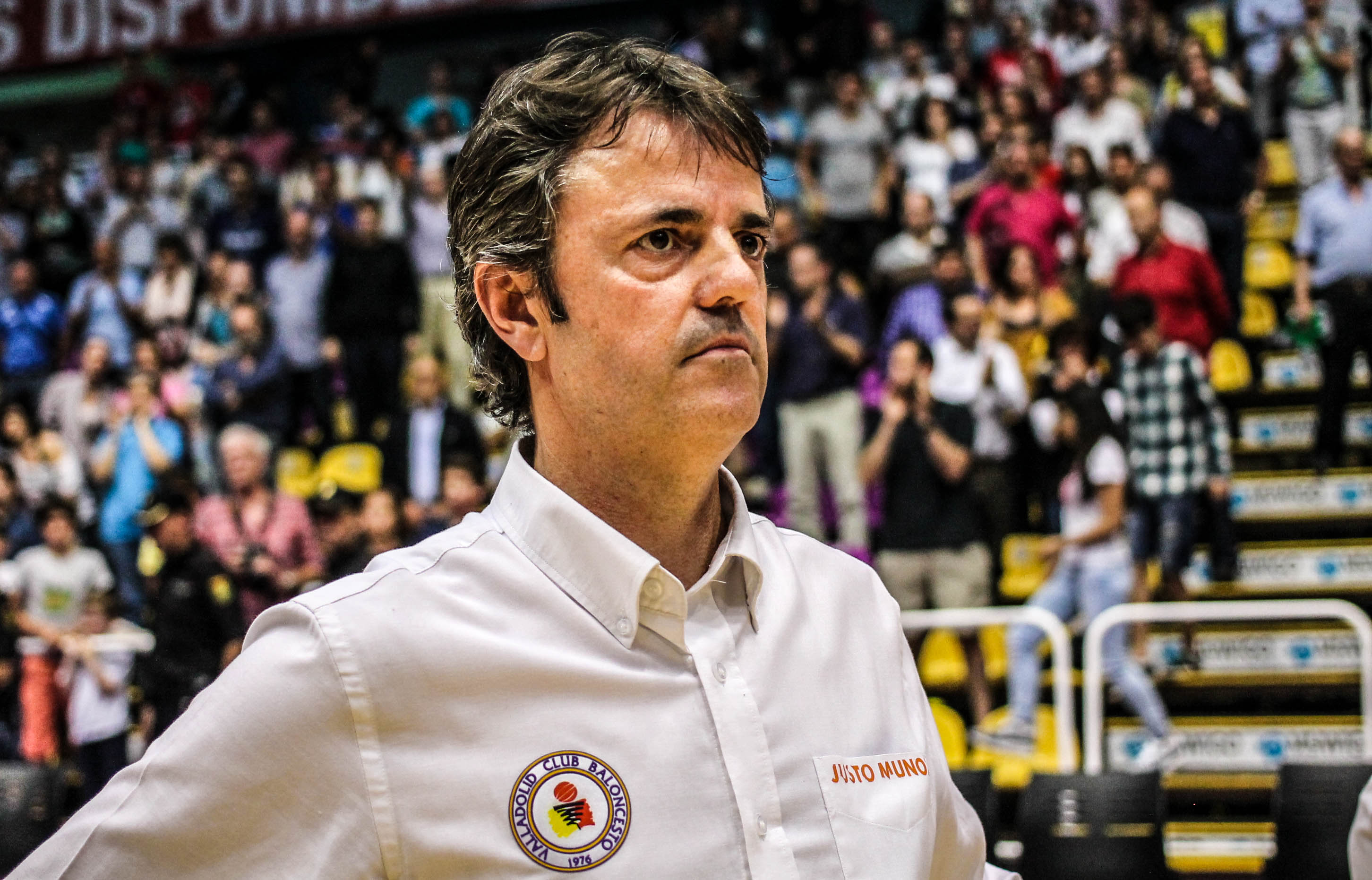
Porfirio Fisac achieved the two LEB Oro titles of the club.

- Aitor Uriondo: 2001–02
- Porfirio Fisac: 2004–07
- Pablo Laso: 2007–11
- Sito Alonso: 2011–14
- Jaume Ponsarnau: 2014–15
- Porfirio Fisac: 2015–2018
- Sergio Valdeolmillos: 2018–2019
- Marcelo Nicola: 2019–2021
- Lolo Encinas: 2021–2023
- Mikel Odriozola: 2023–present

== Season by season ==
Season	Tier	Division	Pos.	W–L	Copa del Rey	Other cups	
2001–02	3	LEB 2	11th	13–17			
2002–04	Did not enter any competition						
2004–05	3	LEB 2	5th (Note: Bought the LEB berth to Algeciras Cepsa.)	23–12		Copa LEB 2	SF
2005–06	2	LEB	1st	26–15			
2006–07	1	Liga ACB	18th	8–26			
2007–08	2	LEB Oro	2nd	28–10		Copa Príncipe	SF
2008–09	1	Liga ACB	12th	11–21			
2009–10	1	Liga ACB	14th	13–21			
2010–11	1	Liga ACB	14th	12–22			
2011–12	1	Liga ACB	5th	20–17	Quarterfinalist		
2012–13	1	Liga ACB	17th (Note: Remained in ACB after Ford Burgos (Atapuerca) did not give the requirements for joining the league.)	8–26			
2013–14	1	Liga ACB	10th	16–18			
2014–15	1	Liga ACB	17th (Note: Remained in ACB after Ford Burgos (Tizona) did not give the requirements for joining the league.)	10–24			
2015–16	1	Liga ACB	18th	7–27			
2016–17	2	LEB Oro	1st	25–9			
2017–18	1	Liga ACB	13th	13–21			
2018–19	1	Liga ACB	17th	10–24			
2019–20	2	LEB Oro	2nd (Note: Season curtailed due to the COVID-19 pandemic.)	18–6		Copa Princesa	C
2020–21	1	Liga ACB	19th	7–29			
2021–22	2	LEB Oro	11th	17–17			
2022–23	2	LEB Oro	5th	22–17			
2023–24	2	LEB Oro	6th	25–14			
2024–25	2	Primera FEB	8th	16–21		Spain Cup	GS
2025–26	2	Primera FEB	6th	19–16		Spain Cup	R32
2026–27	2	Primera FEB				Spain Cup	R32

== Trophies and awards ==
=== Trophies ===
- Liga Española de Baloncesto: (3)
  - 2006, 2017, 2020 (Note: Shared title)
  - Runners-up (1): 2008
- Copa Princesa de Asturias: (1)
  - 2020

=== Individual awards ===
ACB Most Valuable Player

- Andy Panko – 2012

All-ACB First Team

- Andy Panko – 2012
- Sergi Vidal – 2012
- Henk Norel – 2018

ACB Best Young Player Award

- Dani Díez – 2015

== Notable players ==
Note: Flags indicate national team eligibility at FIBA-sanctioned events. Players may hold other non-FIBA nationalities not displayed.

Criteria

To appear in this section a player must have either:

- Set a club record or won an individual award while at the club
- Played at least one official international match for their national team at any time
- Played at least one official NBA match at any time.

- (Spain) Dani Díez
- (Spain) Sergi Vidal
- (Argentina) Federico Kammerichs
- (Brazil) Raul Neto
- (Finland) Alex Murphy
- (Georgia (country)) Nikoloz Tskitishvili
- (Georgia (country)) Beka Burjanadze
- (Georgia (country)) Duda Sanadze
- (Madagascar) Charles Ramsdell
- (Netherlands) Henk Norel
- (Nigeria) Kenny Adeleke
- (United Kingdom) Andrew Lawrence
- (United States) Bernard Hopkins
- (United States) Ivan Johnson
- (United States) Andy Panko
- (United States) Lou Roe
- (United States) Devin Smith
- (United States) Travis Wear
- (United States) Qyntel Woods
