= 2003–04 LEB 2 season =

- League: LEB 2
- Sport: Basketball
- Number of games: 182 (regular season)
- Number of teams: 14
- Season champions: CB Valls
- Season MVP: (United States) Shalawn Miller

LEB 2 seasons
- ← 2002–03 2004–05 →

The 2003–04 LEB 2 season was the 4th season of the LEB Plata, second league of the Liga Española de Baloncesto and third division in Spain.

== Competition format ==
14 teams play the regular season. This is a round robin, where each team will play twice against every rival. After the regular season, the eight first qualified teams played a playoff, were the two finalists promoted to LEB.

The loser of the relegation playoffs was relegated to Liga EBA, played by the two last qualified teams.

If two or more teams have got the same number of winning games, the criteria of tie-breaking are these:

1. Head-to-head winning games.
2. Head-to-head points difference.
3. Total points difference.

== Regular season ==
=== League table ===
#	Teams	GP	W	L	PF	PA	PT	Qualification or relegation
1	Valls Félix Hotel	26	17	9	2011	1875	43	Promotion playoffs
2	Calpe Aguas de Calpe	26	17	9	2007	1875	43	Promotion playoffs
3	Autocid Ford Burgos	26	17	9	2203	2104	43	Promotion playoffs
4	CajaRioja	26	17	9	1950	1915	43	Promotion playoffs
5	Rosalía Peixe Galego	26	16	10	2238	2096	42	Promotion playoffs
6	CB Galicia	26	15	11	2015	2008	41	Promotion playoffs
7	Cosmópolis Badajoz	26	14	12	1970	1920	40	Promotion playoffs
8	Aguas de Valencia Expobar	26	13	13	2022	2034	39	Promotion playoffs
9	WTC Cornellà	26	11	15	1971	2006	37	
10	Rayet Guadalajara	26	11	15	2044	2064	37	
11	Pozuelo CB	26	10	16	1912	1979	36	
12	Cerámica Leoni Castellón	26	10	16	2014	2142	36	
13	Ciudad de La Laguna	26	8	18	2015	2124	34	Relegation playoffs
14	Doncel Aguas Fondetal	26	6	20	1920	2150	32	Relegation playoffs

== Promotion playoffs ==
Quarter Finals
1	Valls Félix Hotel	3
8	Aguas de Valencia	1
4	CajaRioja	1
5	Rosalía Peixe Galego	3
2	Calpe Aguas	3
7	Cosmópolis Badajoz	0
3	Autocid Ford Burgos	3
6	CB Galicia	1

SemiFinals
1	Valls Félix Hotel	3
5	Rosalía Peixe Galego	2
2	Calpe Aguas	3
3	Autocid Ford Burgos	1

Finals
1	Valls Félix Hotel	79
6	Calpe Aguas	74

== Relegation playoffs ==
Finals
13	Ciudad de La Laguna	3
14	Doncel Aguas	1

== MVP of the regular season ==
- (United States) Shalawn Miller (Aguas de Valencia Expobar)
