= CB Atapuerca =

Basketball team in Castile and León, Spain

Ford Burgos
- Nickname: Burgos, Autocid
- Founded: 1997
- History: CD Maristas Burgos (1997–2001); CB Atapuerca (2001–2013)
- Arena: Polideportivo El Plantío
- Location: Burgos, Castilla y León
- Team colors: Blue and orange
- President: Miguel Ángel Benavente
- Vice-president: Vicente Sebastián
- Head coach: Andreu Casadevall
- Championships: 1 LEB Oro; 1 Copa Príncipe; 1 LEB Plata Championship; 2 Copa LEB Plata; 1 Copa Castilla y León
- Retired numbers: 8 (Tony Smith)
- Website: baloncestoatapuerca.es
Home	Away

Club Baloncesto Atapuerca, more commonly known as (Autocid) Ford Burgos by sponsorship reasons, was a professional basketball team based in Burgos, Castilla y León, and played in the Polideportivo El Plantío, in LEB Gold league.

== History ==
The club born as CD Maristas started to play in lower division with that team. CD Maristas reached the Liga EBA in the 98–99 season and competed in that league during three years. In 2001, the club became independent of the Liceo Castilla school and gets the name of CB Atapuerca, more recently becoming known as Autocid Ford Burgos for sponsorship reasons.

In 2002, because of the renounces of other teams, the club reaches the LEB Plata, called LEB–2 that year, and after a first bad year, CB Atapuerca grows and tries to promote to LEB Oro. After two semifinals where they were defeated, in the third play–off they are champions after a double 3–0 (CB Vic in quarterfinals and Ourense in semifinals) and a winning in the final of the league against Gandía.

Since 2006, CB Atapuerca competes in LEB Oro. In 2008–09 season, with Andreu Casadevall as coach, the club reaches the play–off for first time and they lose 2–1 with Alicante Costablanca.

In the 2009–10 season, after finishing the regular season in the fifth position, the reach they play–off finals after winning 3–1 in quarterfinals against Cáceres 2016 and in semifinals against Melilla Baloncesto. In a thrilling series, they lost 3–2 against ViveMenorca, team who finally promoted to Liga ACB.

One year later, Ford Burgos finishes in the third position of the regular season and reaches again the promotion finals, after beating 3–1 to Grupo Iruña Navarra and 3–0 to Girona FC. In the finals, the team losses against Blu:sens Monbús.

In 2012, Ford Burgos played for the first time the Copa Príncipe de Asturias, but was defeated 93–85 by Iberostar Canarias in a game played in San Cristóbal de La Laguna. The team finally won this trophy in the next season, after beating River Andorra in Burgos by 73–67.

On 19 May 2013 the club finished the 2012–13 as champion and consequently promoted to Liga ACB for the first time in its history, but is not accepted in the league due to not paying the entering quota in the Association.

After this setback, CB Atapuerca was replaced and a new society called CB Tizona, remembering the former CB Espada Tizona, which played in the second division in the 1970s and the 1980s, was created with the aim to make easier a future promotion to ACB.

The club is not dissolved and it currently plays in the provincial league of Burgos.

== Retired numbers ==
- 8 Tony Smith, PG, 2003–2007

== Season by season ==
Season	Tier	Division	Pos.	W–L	Cup competitions	
1997–98	5	2ª División	3rd			
1998–99	4	1ª División	1st			
1999–00	3	Liga EBA	8th	15–11		
2000–01	4	Liga EBA	2nd	25–8		
2001–02	4	Liga EBA	5th (Note: Achieved one of the vacant berths at LEB 2.)	22–12		
2002–03	3	LEB 2	15th (Note: Remained in LEB 2 due to the resign of FC Barcelona B and CB Montcada to promote.)	12–22		
2003–04	3	LEB 2	3rd	21–13	Copa LEB 2	SF
2004–05	3	LEB 2	3rd	27–11	Copa LEB 2	C
2005–06	3	LEB 2	1st	29–8	Copa LEB 2	C
2006–07	2	LEB	15th	13–21		
2007–08	2	LEB Oro	11th	15–19		
2008–09	2	LEB Oro	9th	19–18		
2009–10	2	LEB Oro	3rd	29–18		
2010–11	2	LEB Oro	3rd	33–12		
2011–12	2	LEB Oro	6th	23–15	Copa Príncipe	RU
2012–13	2	LEB Oro	1st (Note: Could not promote to Liga ACB after not fulfilling the requirements for promoting Liga ACB.)	22–4	Copa Príncipe	C
2013–14	Did not enter any competition					
2014–15	6	1ª Provincial	2nd	14–6		
2015–16	6	1ª Provincial	2nd	12–5		
2016–17	6	1ª Provincial	1st	14–4		
2017–18	6	1ª Provincial	2nd	14–6		
2018–19	6	1ª Provincial	5th	9–9		

== Honors ==
=== Trophies ===
- LEB Oro (1):
  - 2013
- Copa Príncipe de Asturias (1):
  - 2013
- LEB Plata (1):
  - 2006
- LEB Plata Cup: (2)
  - 2005, 2006
- Copa Castilla y León: (1)
  - 2008

=== Individual awards ===
All LEB Oro First Team

- Micah Downs – 2011

== Notable players ==
- (Argentina) Diego García
- (Argentina) Diego Lo Grippo
- (Argentina) Leo Mainoldi
- (Brazil) Marcus Vinicius Toledo
- (Cape Verde) Jeff Xavier
- (Spain) Carles Marco
- (Spain) Alberto Miguel
- (United Kingdom) Darren Phillip
- (Hungary) Péter Lóránt
- (United States) Micah Downs
- (United States) Zach Morley
- (United States) Luke Sikma
