= CB Valls =

- Leagues: Liga EBA
- Founded: 1952
- Arena: Pavelló Joana Ballart
- Capacity: 1,500
- Location: Valls, Spain
- Team colors: Red and white
- Website: cbvalls.com
Home	Away

Club Bàsquet Valls is a basketball club based in Valls, Catalonia, Spain that currently plays in Liga EBA, the fourth tier of Spanish basketball.

== History ==
Founded in 1952, its first success came in 1993 when the club qualified for the promotion playoffs to the Primera División, at that time the second tier.

In 1995 the club was promoted to Liga EBA after finishing champion of the promotion stage played in Monzón.

In 2001, Valls made its debut in LEB 2, third tier. In its first season, it qualified for the promotion playoffs but was eliminated in the quarterfinals. In 2004, CB Valls finished as semifinalist of the Copa LEB Plata played in Logroño champion of the 2003–04 LEB 2 and subsequently promoted to Liga LEB. The club played only one season, where, despite a great start leading the table during two weeks, it avoided narrowly relegation.

Due to the lack of funds to remain playing in the second tier, in 2005 the club declined to continue in LEB and returned to the regional Catalan leagues. In 2007, despite promotion from Liga EBA to LEB Bronce, CB Valls decided to remain in the EBA league, where it would play one more season before definitively resigning from national competitions.

In 2016, thanks to an expansion of Group C of Liga EBA, Valls returned to that league.

== Sections ==
In 1971, after the opening of municipal pavilion Joana Ballart, the club created its women's basketball team. CB Valls also created several sections like football, cycling, tennis, table tennis, rink hockey and pétanque. Currently, only women's basketball, cycling and table tennis remain active.

== Season by season ==
Season	Tier	Division	Pos.	W–L	Cup competitions	
1995–96	2	Liga EBA	5th	19–14		
1996–97	3	Liga EBA	5th			
1997–98	3	Liga EBA	4th	17–11		
1998–99	3	Liga EBA	2nd	25–6		
1999–00	3	Liga EBA	4th	17–9		
2000–01	4	Liga EBA	5th (Note: Achieved a vacant berth in LEB Plata.)	17–13		
2001–02	3	LEB 2	6th	17–13		
2002–03	3	LEB 2	9th	15–15		
2003–04	3	LEB 2	1st	24–12	Copa LEB Plata	SF
2004–05	2	LEB	15th (Note: Resigned to its place in LEB.)	13–21		
2006–07	6	1ª Catalana	8th	14–16		
2006–07	6	1ª Catalana	1st	26–6		
2007–08	5	Liga EBA	1st	25–8		
2008–09	5	Liga EBA	11th	13–17		
2009–10	6	1ª Catalana	7th	14–16		
2010–11	6	1ª Catalana	2nd	27–3		
2011–12	7	2ª Catalana	1st	26–4		
2012–13	6	1ª Catalana	14th	11–19		
2013–14	7	2ª Catalana	2nd	21–9		
2014–15	6	1ª Catalana	4th	18–14		
2015–16	5	Copa Catalunya	7th (Note: Achieved a vacant berth in Liga EBA.)	16–14		
2016–17	4	Liga EBA	10th	11–15		
2017–18	4	Liga EBA	4th	17–9		
2018–19	4	Liga EBA	11th	9–17		
2019–20	4	Liga EBA	4th	14–7		

== Notable players ==
- (Spain) Rafa Martínez
- (Spain) Guille Rubio
