= Bilbao Basket =

Surne Bilbao Basket
- Nickname: Beltzezko gizonak Hombres de negro (Men in Black)
- Leagues: Liga ACB; Champions League
- Founded: 7 March 2000; 26 years ago
- History: Club Basket Bilbao Berri (2000–present)
- Arena: Bilbao Arena
- Capacity: 10,014
- Location: Bilbao, Spain
- Team colors: Black, Silver
- President: Isabel Iturbe
- Head coach: Jaume Ponsarnau
- Championships: 2 FIBA Europe Cup; 1 LEB; 1 Copa LEB Plata
- Retired numbers: 2 (14, 15)
- Website: bilbaobasket.biz
Home	Away	Third

Club Basket Bilbao Berri S.A.D., commonly known as Bilbao Basket (pronounced [bilˈβao βasˈket]), also known as Surne Bilbao Basket for sponsorship reasons, is a professional basketball club based in Bilbao, Spain. The team plays in the Liga ACB. Their home arena is the Bilbao Arena.

== History ==
The club was founded in 2000 after replacing the former city clubs: Cajabilbao and SD Patronato. After four seasons between LEB and LEB 2, Bilbao promoted to Liga ACB in 2004 by winning by 3–1 to Baloncesto León in the LEB semifinals.

Bilbao spent ten seasons in the top tier of the Spanish basketball becoming finalist of the league in the 2010–11 season, where it lost in the finals to FC Barcelona by 3–0. In 2012, Bilbao played the EuroLeague and it was eliminated in the quarterfinals by CSKA Moscow, who won the series by 3–1.

The best era of the club finished in 2013, when it lost the 2013 Eurocup Final at Charleroi against Lokomotiv Kuban.

On 17 July 2014, the ACB excluded Bilbao Basket from the Liga ACB due to its financial trouble, but on 8 August, the Association was forced to retire the exclusion and finally Bilbao Basket remained in the Spanish top league.

The club played four more seasons in Liga ACB until their relegation on 13 May 2018, after losing against Baskonia the Basque derby by 74–78.

== Sponsorship naming ==
Bilbao Basket has had several denominations through the years due to its sponsorship:

- Lagun Aro Bilbao Basket: 2004–07
- iurbentia Bilbao Basket: 2007–09
- Bizkaia Bilbao Basket: 2009–11
- Gescrap Bizkaia Bilbao Basket: 2011–12
- Uxúe Bilbao Basket: 2012–13
- Dominion Bilbao Basket: 2015–16
- RETAbet Bilbao Basket: 2016–21
- Surne Bilbao Basket: 2021–present

== Logos ==
Non-commercial logo since 2009

2007–2009

2015–2016

2016–2021

== Home arenas ==
- Pabellón La Casilla: (2000–09)
- Bizkaia Arena: (2009–10), occasionally used for home games in 2007 and 2008
- Bilbao Arena: (2010–present)

== Players ==
=== Retired numbers ===
Bilbao Basket retired numbers
No.	Nat.	Player	Position	Tenure
14	(Spain)	Javi Salgado	PG	2001–2010, 2016–2019
15	(Spain)	Álex Mumbrú	SF	2009–2018

=== Current roster ===
Note: Flags indicate national team eligibility at FIBA-sanctioned events. Players may hold other non-FIBA nationalities not displayed.

Surne Bilbao Basket roster
Players
Coaches

Pos.	No.	Nat.	Name	Ht.	Age
G/F	2	(Lithuania)	Normantas, Margiris	1.94 m (6 ft 4 in)	29 – 27 October 1996
PG	3	(Norway)	Frey, Harald	1.88 m (6 ft 2 in)	29 – 27 May 1997
PG	7	(Slovenia)	Duščak, Dan	1.85 m (6 ft 1 in)	24 – 2 July 2002
SG	8	(Canada)	Darling, Nate	1.98 m (6 ft 6 in)	28 – 30 August 1998
SF	9	(Spain)	Ansorregi, Manex	1.95 m (6 ft 5 in)	24 – 11 April 2002
F/C	10	(Slovenia)	Krampelj, Martin	2.06 m (6 ft 9 in)	31 – 10 March 1995
G/F	11	(United States)	Hilliard, Darrun	1.98 m (6 ft 6 in)	33 – 13 April 1993
C	17	(Czech Republic)	Husták, Ondřej	2.12 m (6 ft 11 in)	22 – 4 November 2003
F	18	(Poland)	Petrasek, Luke	2.08 m (6 ft 10 in)	31 – 17 August 1995
SG	22	(Spain)	Font, Aleix	1.94 m (6 ft 4 in)	28 – 11 March 1998
PG	30	(Hungary)	Somogyi, Ádám	1.95 m (6 ft 5 in)	26 – 30 June 2000
C	32	(Iceland)	Hlinason, Tryggvi (C)	2.15 m (7 ft 1 in)	28 – 28 October 1997
C	34	(France)	Vautier, Bastien	2.10 m (6 ft 11 in)	27 – 15 November 1998

Head coach

- (Spanish Basketball Federation) Jaume Ponsarnau

Assistant coach(es)

- (Spanish Basketball Federation) Javi Salgado
- (Spanish Basketball Federation) Mikel Odriozola

Legend

- (C) Team captain
- (Y) Youth player
- Injured

- Roster
- Transactions
Updated: August 24, 2026

=== Depth chart ===
Pos.	Starting 5	Bench 1	Bench 2
C	Tryggvi Hlinason	Bastien Vautier	Ondřej Husták †
PF	Martin Krampelj	Luke Petrasek
SF	Darrun Hilliard *	Margiris Normantas	Manex Ansorregi †
SG	Nate Darling *	Aleix Font †
PG	Ádám Somogyi †	Harald Frey	Dan Duščak †

Notes: Blue † – homegrown player; (Note: A homegrown player is a player that played for at least three years before the age of 20 on a Spanish team. In Liga ACB, the team must register at least four homegrown players in rosters of 10–12 players or at least three homegrown players in rosters of 8–9 players. In Champions League, the team must register at least five homegrown players in rosters of 11–12 players or at least four homegrown players in rosters of 10 players.) Red * – overseas player; (Note: An overseas player is a player from outside EEA, FIBA Europe or ACP states. In Liga ACB, the team may register at most two overseas players. In Champions League, the team did not have any limitations regarding the number of overseas players.) Green ‡ – youth player (Note: In Liga ACB, the team may register under-22 players linked to the youth system.)

== Head coaches ==
- Txutxo Sanz: 2000–2001
- Pedro Zorrozua: 2001
- Txus Vidorreta: 2001–2010
- Rafa Pueyo: 2010, 2013–2014
- Fotios Katsikaris: 2010–2013
- Sito Alonso: 2014–2016
- Carles Duran: 2016–2017
- Veljko Mršić: 2017–2018
- Jaka Lakovič: 2018
- Álex Mumbrú: 2018–2022
- Jaume Ponsarnau: 2022–present

== Season by season ==
Season	Tier	Division	Pos.	W–L	Copa del Rey	Other cups		European competitions		
2000–01	3	LEB 2	13th	13–20						
2001–02	3	LEB 2	1st	31–8		Copa LEB Plata	C			
2002–03	2	LEB	6th	21–14		Copa Príncipe	RU			
2003–04	2	LEB	1st	29–14		Copa Príncipe	SF			
2004–05	1	Liga ACB	14th	12–22						
2005–06	1	Liga ACB	15th	13–21						
2006–07	1	Liga ACB	10th	15–19						
2007–08	1	Liga ACB	7th	21–15	Semifinalist	Supercopa	RU			
2008–09	1	Liga ACB	8th	15–19				2 Eurocup	SF	11–3
2009–10	1	Liga ACB	9th	16–18	Quarterfinalist			2 Eurocup	3rd	13–5
2010–11	1	Liga ACB	2nd	26–17	Quarterfinalist					
2011–12	1	Liga ACB	6th	19–17		Supercopa	SF	1 Euroleague	QF	10–10
2012–13	1	Liga ACB	7th	20–17	Quarterfinalist			2 Eurocup	RU	13–4
2013–14	1	Liga ACB	14th	12–22		Supercopa	SF	2 Eurocup	L32	8–8
2014–15	1	Liga ACB	5th	21–18	Quarterfinalist					
2015–16	1	Liga ACB	10th	16–18	Semifinalist			2 Eurocup	L32	11–5
2016–17	1	Liga ACB	10th	14–18				2 EuroCup	RS	3–5
2017–18	1	Liga ACB	17th	8–26				2 EuroCup	RS	2–8
2018–19	2	LEB Oro	2nd	29–12		Copa Princesa	RU			
2019–20	1	Liga ACB	8th	15–13	Quarterfinalist					
2020–21	1	Liga ACB	17th	10–26				3 Champions League	RS	2–4
2021–22	1	Liga ACB	9th	16–18						
2022–23	1	Liga ACB	12th	14–20				3 Champions League	R16	5–7
2023–24	1	Liga ACB	13th	13–21				4 Europe Cup	SF	12–4
2024–25	1	Liga ACB	16th	11–23				4 Europe Cup	C	16–4
2025–26	1	Liga ACB	8th	19–17				4 Europe Cup	C	16–2

== Trophies and awards ==
=== Trophies ===
- FIBA Europe Cup:
  - Winners (2): 2025, 2026
- Liga ACB:
  - Runners-up (1): 2011
- Supercopa de España:
  - Runners-up (1): 2007
- EuroCup:
  - Runners-up (1): 2013
- LEB:
  - Winners (1): 2004
- Copa Princesa de Asturias:
  - Runners-up (2): 2002, 2019
- LEB Plata: (1)
  - 2002
- Copa LEB Plata: (1)
  - 2002

=== Individual awards ===
All-ACB First Team

- Marcelo Huertas – 2008
- Marko Todorović – 2015
- Álex Mumbrú – 2016

EuroCup MVP

- Marko Banić – 2010

All-EuroCup First Team

- Marko Banić – 2009, 2010
- Kostas Vasileiadis – 2013

All-EuroCup Second Team

- Lamont Hamilton – 2013

EuroCup Coach of the Year

- Fotios Katsikaris – 2013

== Notable players ==
Note: Flags indicate national team eligibility at FIBA-sanctioned events. Players may hold other non-FIBA nationalities not displayed.

Criteria

To appear in this section a player must have either:

- Set a club record or won an individual award while at the club
- Played at least one official international match for their national team at any time
- Played at least one official NBA match at any time.

- (Spain) Quino Colom
- (Spain) Alberto Díaz
- (Spain) Germán Gabriel
- (Spain) Roger Grimau
- (Spain) Eduardo Hernández-Sonseca
- (Spain) Raül López
- (Spain) Rafa Martínez
- (Spain) Álex Mumbrú
- (Spain) Javi Salgado
- (Spain) Fran Vázquez
- (Belgium) Axel Hervelle
- (Brazil) Marcelo Huertas
- (Brazil) Rafa Luz
- (Brazil) Tiago Splitter
- (Croatia) Marko Banić
- (Croatia) Damir Markota
- (Czech Republic) Ondřej Balvín
- (Dominican Republic) Ángel Delgado
- (France) Damien Inglis
- (France) Adrien Moerman
- (France) Jérôme Moïso
- (France) Frédéric Weis
- (Ghana) Ben Bentil
- (Greece) Georgios Bogris
- (Greece) Dimitrios Mavroeidis
- (Greece) Kostas Vasileiadis
- (Greece) Nikos Zisis
- (Israel) D'or Fischer
- (Latvia) Dairis Bertāns
- (Latvia) Jānis Blūms
- (Lithuania) Antanas Kavaliauskas
- (Lithuania) Arnoldas Kulboka
- (Lithuania) Renaldas Seibutis
- (Lithuania) Gytis Masiulis
- (Lithuania) Osvaldas Matulionis
- (Montenegro) Predrag Savović
- (Montenegro) Marko Todorović
- (Nigeria) Micheal Eric
- (Slovakia) Martin Rančík
- (Sweden) Ludvig Håkanson
- (United States) Jaylon Brown
- (United States) Andrew Goudelock
- (United States) Lamont Hamilton
- (United States) Aaron Jackson
- (United States) John Jenkins
- (United States) Quincy Lewis
- (United States) Khyri Thomas
- (United States) Jeff Withey

== Matches against NBA teams ==
Win Loss

6 October 2013	Bilbao Basket	104–106	Philadelphia 76ers	Barakaldo
	Scoring by quarter: 20–27, 30–28, 30–24, 24–27
	Pts: Bertāns 19; Rebs: Hervelle 14; Asts: Mumbrú 6	Boxscore	Pts: Turner 25; Rebs: Anderson 7 Asts: Carter-Williams 6	Arena: Bizkaia Arena; Attendance: 13,538; Referees: Scott Foster, Eric Dalen, Antonio Conde

== Rivalries ==
Bilbao Basket has a strong rivalry with Saski Baskonia. Their games together are called the Basque basketball derby.

== Fundación Bilbao Basket ==
Fundación Bilbao Basket is the reserve team of Bilbao Basket. It currently plays in Tercera FEB, the fourth tier of Spanish basketball.

=== Season by season ===
Season	Tier	Division	Pos.	W–L
2019–20	5	1ª Nacional	12th (Note: Season curtailed due to the COVID-19 pandemic.)	5–13
2020–21	5	1ª Nacional	3rd	10–1–6
2021–22	5	1ª Nacional	1st	16–6
2022–23	4	Liga EBA	3rd	16–11
2023–24	4	Liga EBA	1st	25–4
2024–25	4	Tercera FEB	5th	14–12
