= CB Tarragona =

- Leagues: Liga EBA
- Founded: 1978
- Arena: El Serrallo
- Location: Tarragona, Spain
- Team colors: Blue and yellow
- President: Sergi Bru Budesca
- Head coach: Berni Álvarez
- Championships: 1 Copa LEB Plata
- Retired numbers: 5 Berni Álvarez
- Website: www.cbtarragona.com
Home	Away

Club Bàsquet Tarragona, more commonly referred to today by its sponsorship name of Tarragona Bàsquet 2017, is a professional Basketball team based in Tarragona, Catalonia who currently plays in LEB Plata.

== Season by season ==
Season	Tier	Division	Pos.	W–L	Cup competitions	
1990–91	3	2ª División				
1991–92	3	2ª División				
1992–93	2	1ª División	14th	23–13		
1993–94	2	1ª División	17th	8–22		
1994–95	2	Liga EBA	1st	23–13		
1995–96	3	Liga EBA	13th (Note: Remained in the league after achieving a vacant berth.)	13–17		
1996–97	3	Liga EBA	11th			
1997–98	3	Liga EBA	10th	10–16		
1998–99	3	Liga EBA	8th	16–14		
1999–00	3	Liga EBA	8th (Note: Achieved a berth in the new LEB 2.)	10–16		
2000–01	3	LEB 2	3rd	26–14	Copa LEB 2	C
2001–02	3	LEB 2	2nd	28–12	Copa LEB 2	RU
2002–03	2	LEB	12th	12–18		
2003–04	2	LEB	13th	15–19		
2004–05	2	LEB	7th	19–19		
2005–06	2	LEB	7th	17–20		
2006–07	2	LEB	18th	11–23		
2007–08	3	LEB Plata	10th	17–17		
2008–09	3	LEB Plata	3rd (Note: Achieved one of the vacant berths of LEB Oro.)	21–15		
2009–10	2	LEB Oro	16th	15–23		
2010–11	2	LEB Oro	13th	12–22		
2011–12	2	LEB Oro	16th (Note: Resigned to its berth at LEB Oro.)	14–23		
2012–13	4	Liga EBA	1st	29–7		
2013–14	4	Liga EBA	3rd (Note: Achieved a vacant berth in LEB Plata.)	16–7		
2014–15	3	LEB Plata	10th	12–16		
2015–16	3	LEB Plata	4th	17–15		
2016–17	3	LEB Plata	14th	9–21		
2017–18	4	Liga EBA	6th	14–12		
2018–19	4	Liga EBA	1st	25–6		
2019–20	4	Liga EBA	1st	18–3		

== Retired numbers ==
- 5 Berni Álvarez, SF, 1992–95, 2004–07, 2008–10

== Trophies and awards ==
=== Trophies ===
- Copa LEB Plata: (1)
  - 2001

== Current roster ==
Note: Flags indicate national team eligibility at FIBA-sanctioned events. Players may hold other non-FIBA nationalities not displayed.

Ibersol CB Tarragona roster
Players
Coaches

Pos.	No.	Nat.	Name	Ht.	Age
SF	10	(Spain)	Barberà, Jordi	2.02 m (6 ft 8 in)	29 – 30 April 1996
PF	15	(Portugal)	Coronel, Kevin	1.98 m (6 ft 6 in)	33 – 3 September 1991
SG	8	(Spain)	Duch, Adrià	1.85 m (6 ft 1 in)	30 – 28 March 1995
PG	17	(Spain)	Fernández, Daniel	1.81 m (5 ft 11 in)	30 – 18 December 1994
PG		(Spain)	Fernández, David	1.79 m (5 ft 10 in)	34 – 10 July 1991
PF	11	(Andorra)	Guzmán, Aarón	1.99 m (6 ft 6 in)	27 – 9 July 1998
	22	(Senegal)	Ndiaye, Daouda		28 – 16 October 1996
C	14	(Spain)	Torres, Ferran	2.01 m (6 ft 7 in)	37 – 29 January 1988
SG	13	(Spain)	Tugores, Daniel	1.85 m (6 ft 1 in)	30 – 21 April 1995
SG	77	(Spain)	Vinós, Víctor	1.93 m (6 ft 4 in)	28 – 1 January 1997
SF	9	(Spain)	Zanca, Jaume	1.95 m (6 ft 5 in)	28 – 16 July 1997

Head coach

- (Spain) Berni Álvarez

Legend

- (C) Team captain
- Injured
