= Fuenterrebollo =

- Municipality
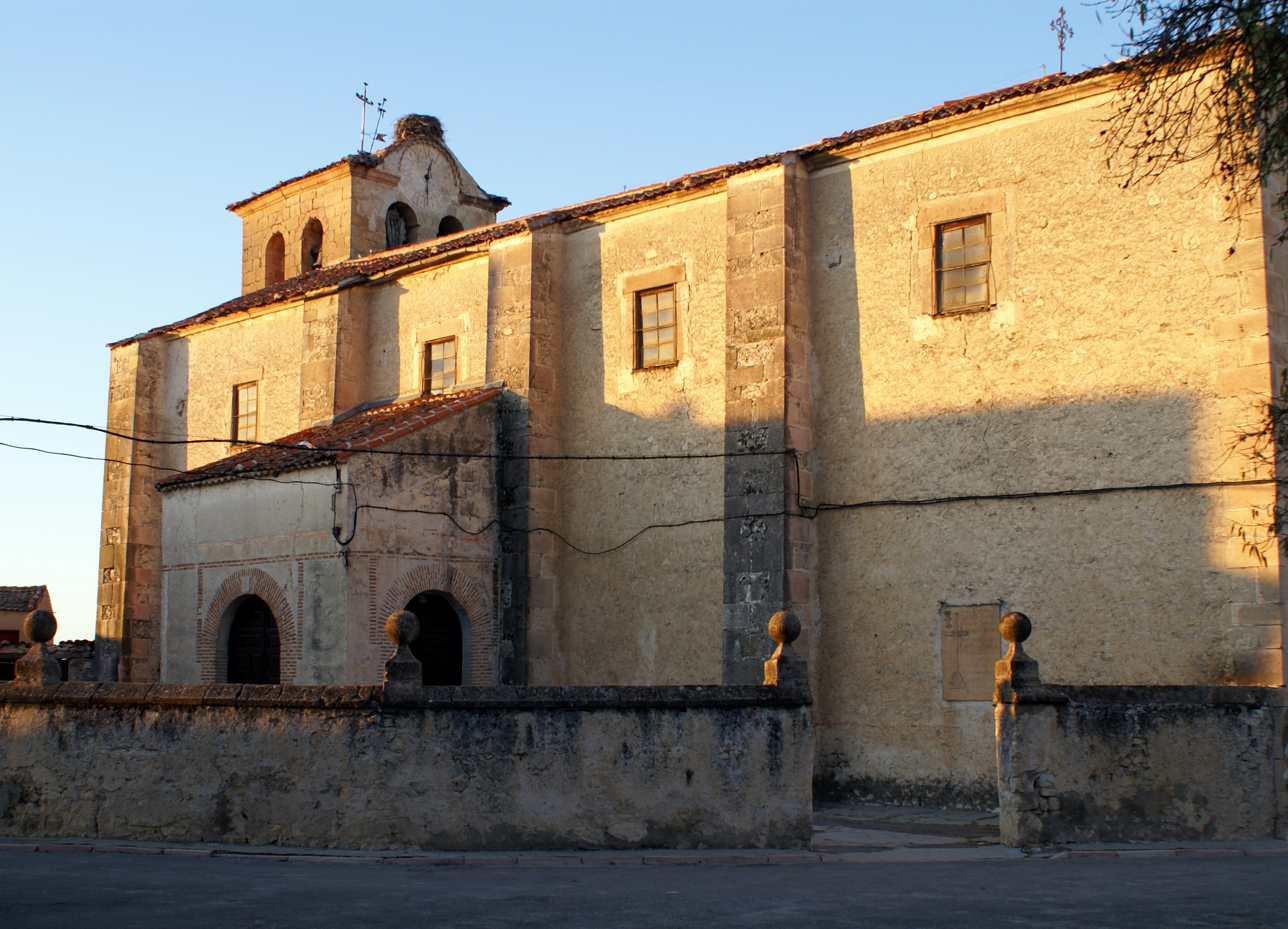
- Church of Fuenterrebollo

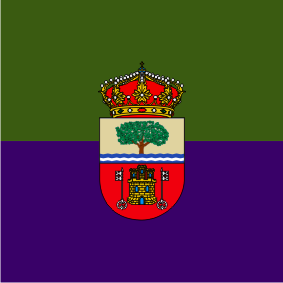
- Flag Coat of arms

- Location in Spain. Fuenterrebollo (Spain)
- Coordinates: 41°17′49″N 3°55′49″W
- Country: Spain
- Autonomous community: Castile and León
- Province: Segovia
- Municipality: Fuenterrebollo

Area
  - Total: 36 km^{2} (14 sq mi)

Population (2025-01-01)
  - Total: 313
  - Density: 8.7/km^{2} (23/sq mi)
- Time zone: UTC+1 (CET)
  - Summer (DST): UTC+2 (CEST)
- Website: Official website

Fuenterrebollo is a municipality located in the province of Segovia, Castile and León, Spain. According to the 2004 census (INE), the municipality has a population of 394 inhabitants.
