= UB La Palma =

- Founded: 1978
- Dissolved: 2012
- Arena: Multiusos Santa Cruz de La Palma
- Location: Santa Cruz de La Palma, Canary Islands
- Team colors: Navy blue, red and white
- President: Antonio Acosta
- Vice-president(s): Jorge González
- Head coach: Carlos Frade
- Championships: 1 Liga EBA Championship
- Website: ublapalma.blogspot.com
Home	Away

Unión Baloncesto La Palma is a professional basketball team based in Santa Cruz de La Palma, Canary Islands.

In 2012, the club announced the senior team would cease in activity.

== Season by season ==
Season	Tier	Division	Pos.	W–L	Cup competitions	
1994–95	3	2ª División	5th			
1995–96	3	2ª División	3rd			
1996–97	4	2ª División	2nd			
1997–98	3	Liga EBA	8th	14–14		
1998–99	3	Liga EBA	2nd	28–8		
1999–00	3	Liga EBA	1st	24–5	Copa EBA	SF
2000–01	3	LEB 2	4th	25–13	Copa LEB 2	SF
2001–02	3	LEB 2	4th	22–17		
2002–03	3	LEB 2	5th (Note: Bought the LEB berth to Universidad Complutense.)	21–12		
2003–04	2	LEB	7th	19–19	Copa Príncipe	SF
2004–05	2	LEB	16th	15–23		
2005–06	2	LEB	10th	16–18		
2006–07	2	LEB	11th	16–18		
2007–08	2	LEB Oro	17th (Note: Remained in LEB Oro after achieving one of the vacant berths.)	12–22		
2008–09	2	LEB Oro	14th	14–20		
2009–10	2	LEB Oro	10th	16–18		
2010–11	2	LEB Oro	10th	16–18		
2011–12	2	LEB Oro	9th	20–18		

== Trophies and awards ==
=== Individual awards ===
LEB Plata MVP

- Rahshon Turner – 2001
