= Henk Norel =

Dutch basketball player (born 1987)

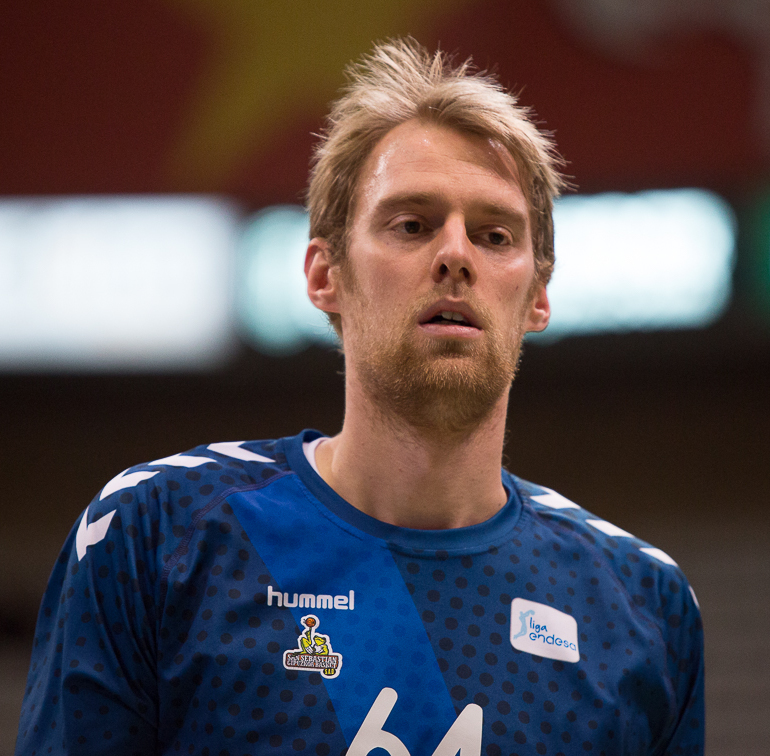
- Norel with GBC in 2017.

Personal information
- Born: 17 September 1987 (age 39) Gorinchem, Netherlands
- Listed height: 6 ft 11 in (2.11 m)
- Listed weight: 230 lb (104 kg)

Career information
- NBA draft: 2009: 2nd round, 47th overall pick
- Drafted by: Minnesota Timberwolves
- Playing career: 2005–2021
- Position: Power forward / center
- Number: 17, 23, 24, 25, 64, 70, 74, 77
- Coaching career: 2021–present

Career history
- 2005–2012: Joventut
- 2005–2006: →Prat
- 2007–2008: →Lucentum Alicante
- 2012–2017: Zaragoza
- 2017–2018: Gipuzkoa
- 2018–2019: Breogán
- 2019–2020: Heroes Den Bosch
- 2021: Heroes Den Bosch

Career highlights
- Eurocup champion (2008); Eurochallenge champion (2006); Liga EBA champion (2007); All-Liga ACB First Team (2018)
- Stats at Basketball Reference

Henk Norel (born 17 September 1987) is a Dutch retired basketball player. He was drafted with the 47th overall pick in the 2009 NBA draft by the Minnesota Timberwolves. He also appeared in 79 international games representing the Netherlands.

== Early life ==
During his younger years Norel played for SV Argon, a team based in Mijdrecht. In the 2004–05 season he played for a junior team of Demon Astronauts, a professional club from Amsterdam.

== Professional career ==
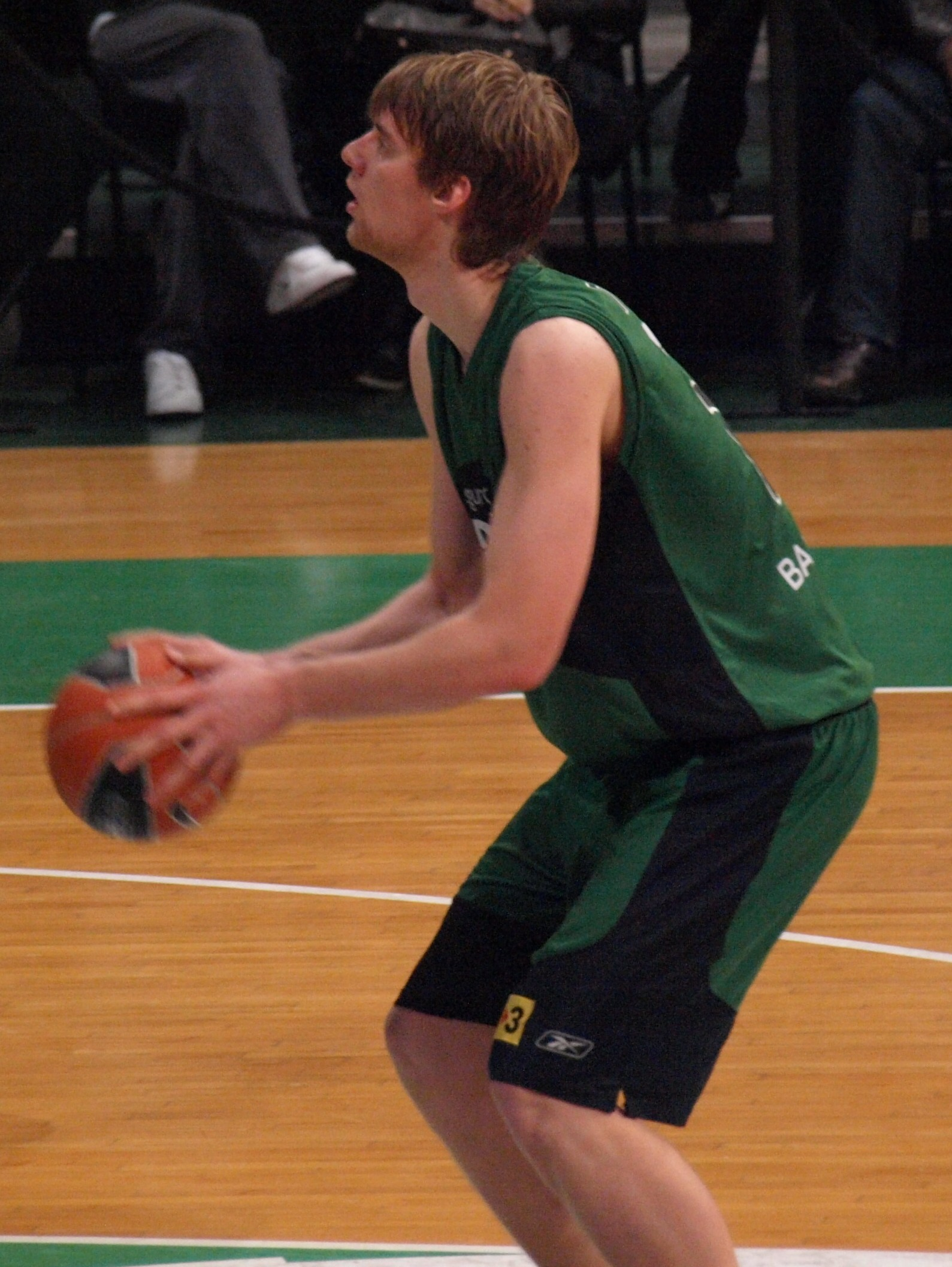
Norel, with Joventut in 2009.

Norel entered the Joventut Badalona team in 2005, but played on loan for CB Prat and Lucentum Alicante the following seasons.

In the 2009 NBA draft Norel was drafted by the Minnesota Timberwolves with the 47th overall pick, which made him the 7th Dutch player who was drafted.

Starting from the 2009–10 season Norel became a rotation player for Joventut in the Liga ACB.

In the 2012 offseason Norel signed a three-year deal with CAI Zaragoza, another team from the ACB. In his first season his numbers rose, as he averaged 13.3 points per game and was 5th in PIR rating in the league. After Norel suffered a knee injury in May 2013, he took a long time to recover. His first appearance back on the court was in January 2014.

On 26 June 2017, Norel left Zaragoza after five seasons.

On 4 August 2017, Norel signed with RETAbet.es GBC. In his first month with GBC, Norel received the ACB Player of the Month Award for October. He was named to the All-Liga ACB First Team after the 2017–18 season.

On 26 July 2018, Norel signed with Cafés Candelas Breogán of the Liga ACB.

On 6 December 2019, Norel signed a contract until 2021 with Heroes Den Bosch of the Dutch Basketball League (DBL). It marked the first time Norel signed with a team from his home country. In his debut season in the DBL, Norel averaged 7 points and 4.7 rebounds over seven games.

On 3 August 2020, Norel announced his retirement citing lingering knee injuries as reason, but on January 9, 2021, the Heroes Den Bosch announced the return of Norel. On 18 February, Norel retired again after appearing in two games. He joined the club's staff as performance trainer.

== National team career ==
Norel represented the Netherlands national basketball team in international competitions. With the Netherlands, he played at EuroBasket 2017. On 17 May 2018, Norel announced his retirement from the Dutch national team, as he indicated he needed rest to focus on his club career. Over an 11-year span, Norel played 79 games with the Netherlands.
