= Donostia Arena =

Bullring in San Sebastián, Spain

Illumbe Arena
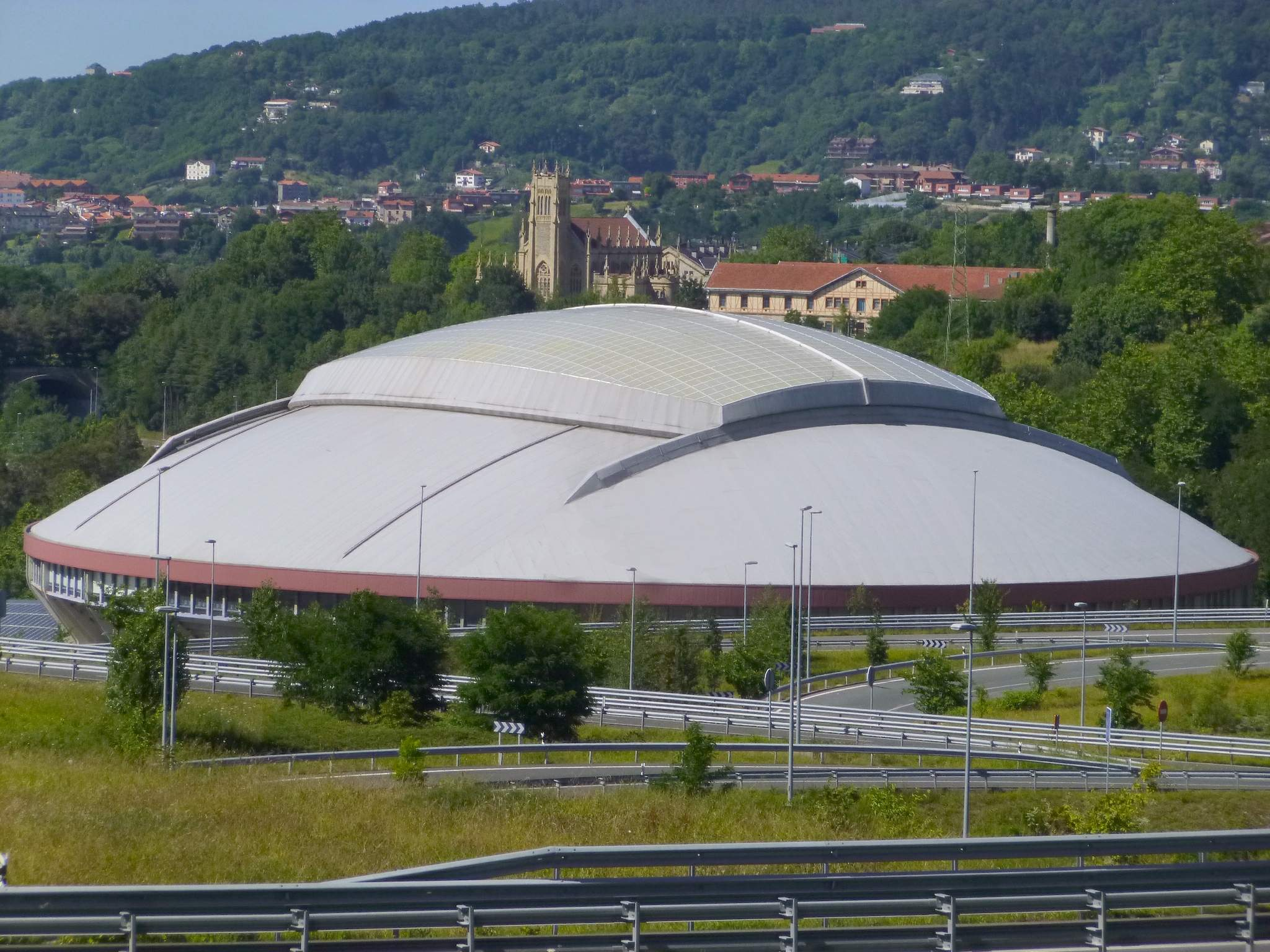
- Interactive map of Illumbe Arena
- Location: San Sebastián, Basque Country, Spain
- Coordinates: 43°17′51.35″N 1°58′7.46″W
- Capacity: 11,000

Construction
- Opened: 1998

Tenant
- Gipuzkoa BC

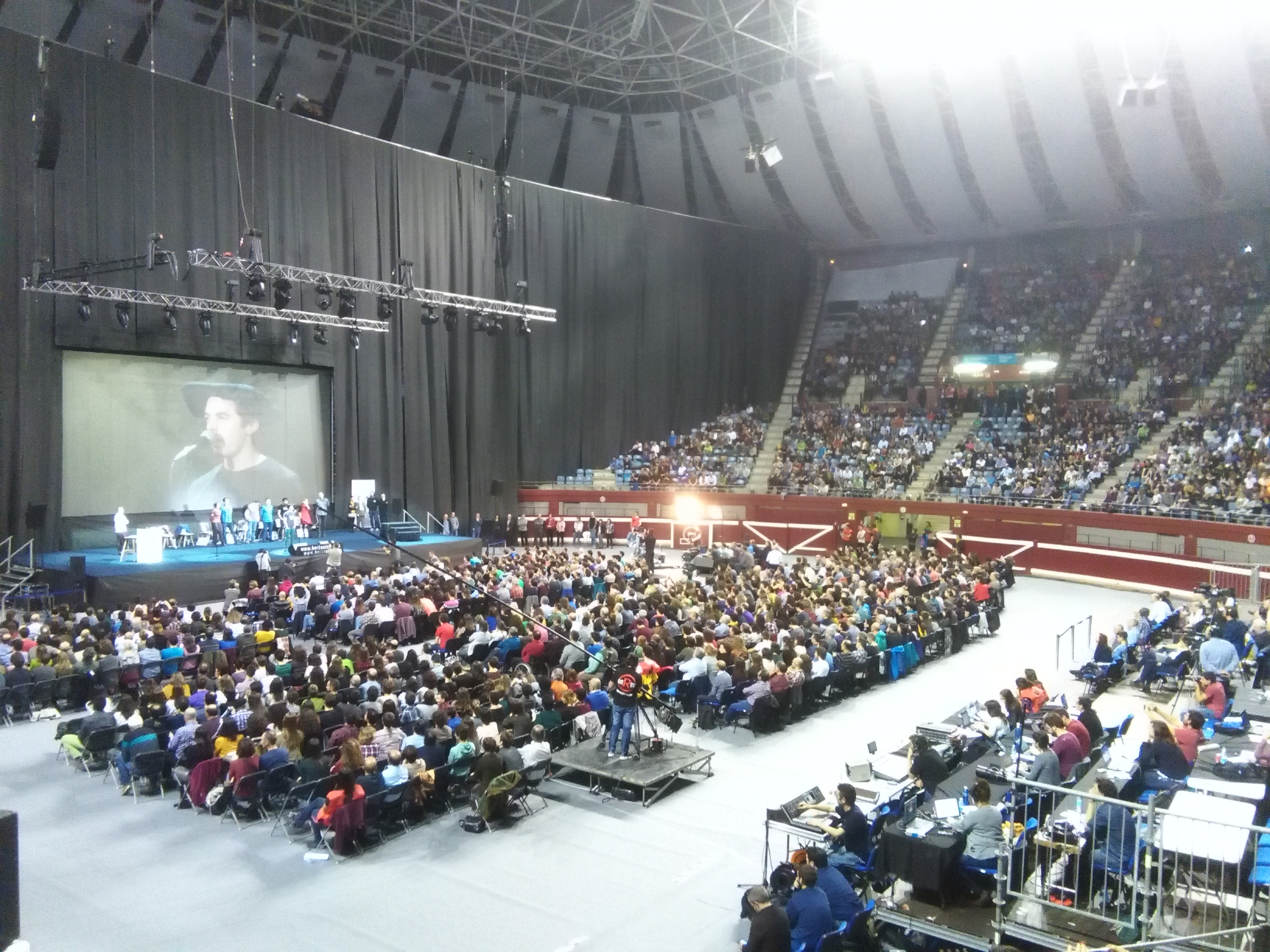
Illumbe, during a bertsolaritza contest.

Plaza de Toros de Illumbe, also known as Donostia Arena, is an arena in San Sebastián, Spain. It is primarily used for basketball and the home arena of San Sebastián Gipuzkoa BC. The arena holds 11,000 people and opened in 1998. In accord with its name, it is also used for bullfighting.

== See also ==
- List of indoor arenas in Spain
