= Rahshon Turner =

American basketball player (born 1975)

Personal information
- Born: March 10, 1975 (age 51) Passaic, New Jersey, U.S.
- Listed height: 6 ft 7 in (2.01 m)
- Listed weight: 200 lb (91 kg)

Career information
- High school: Passaic (Passaic, New Jersey)
- College: Fairleigh Dickinson (1994–1998)
- NBA draft: 1998: undrafted
- Playing career: 1998–2013
- Position: Power forward / center

Career history
- 1998–1999: Groningen
- 2000: New Jersey Shorecats
- 2000–2001: UB La Palma
- 2001–2003: JA Vichy
- 2003–2005: Le Mans Sarthe Basket
- 2005–2007: BCM Gravelines
- 2008: Barangay Ginebra Kings
- 2008–2009: Ironi Ashkelon
- 2009–2010: Menorca Bàsquet
- 2010–2011: Ironi Ashkelon
- 2011: Libertad de Sunchales
- 2011–2012: Hapoel Yokneam
- 2012: Stabill Jezioro Tarnobrzeg
- 2012–2013: Georgia Prime

Career highlights
- Israeli League Rebounding Leader (2009); French 2nd Division champion (2002); French 2nd Division Foreign Player's MVP (2002); French Cup winner (2004); Spanish 3rd Division MVP (2001)

Rahshon Turner (born March 10, 1975) is an American former professional basketball player. Turner is a veteran of the European leagues, playing for teams in the Netherlands, France, Israel, and Spain. In 2008-09 he was the top rebounder in the Israel Basketball Premier League.

== College career ==
Turner spent his collegiate career at Fairleigh Dickinson University Knights from 1994 to 1998. He began by being named Newcomer of the Year in the Northeast Conference (NEC). He made the NEC First Team in 1997 and 1998. In his last college season, he averaged 17.9 points, 10.6 rebounds, 2.1 blocks, 1.6 assists and 1.1 steals per game as FDU won its third league title. He led the Knights to a berth in the 1998 NCAA Tournament and nearly upset the University of Connecticut Huskies in the First round of March Madness.

== Professional career ==
Turner tried to continue his career as a professional in Europe, but failed to stay on with teams in the Netherlands and France that first year out of school. He then returned to New Jersey and became a women's basketball assistant coach at the New Jersey Institute of Technology.

After less than two years, he decided to give pro ball another shot across the Atlantic. Turner, a power forward, played one season in Spain, and with the 2006–07 season, was in his sixth straight season playing professional ball in France.

Turner averaged 15.4 points and 7.8 rebounds per game in 28 French League games in 2005–06, and was named the top forward in the league by eurobasket.com. He has won several honors during his European career and was averaging 10.6 points per game and 5.0 rebounds per game as of January 11, 2007.

In 2008-09 he was the top rebounder in the Israel Basketball Premier League.

Preceded by Rod Nealy	Barangay Ginebra Kings; Fiesta Conference import player 2008	Succeeded by Ernest Brown
