= CB Alcúdia =

Basketball team in Balearic Islands, Spain

Club Bàsquet Alcúdia
- Leagues: 8th - LEB
- Founded: 1983
- History: CB Alcúdia (1983–2004); Alcúdia-Aracena (2004–2005); Palma Aqua Màgica (2005–2008); CB Alcúdia (2008–present)
- Location: Alcúdia, Balearic Islands
- Team colors: Blue and white
- President: Guillermo Alomar
- Vice-president: Miquel Ramis
Home	Away

Club Bàsquet Alcúdia is a professional basketball team based in Alcúdia, Balearic Islands, that is not currently registered in any competition. In season 2007–08, the team played in LEB Oro.

== History ==
CB Alcúdia played in balearic competitions until 2004-05, when they merge with CB Aracena and they play in LEB Plata with the name of Alcúdia-Aracena. With Eloy Doce as coach, they reach the LEB Oro in their first season.

Due to problems with the pavilion, the team goes to Palma Arena in Palma de Mallorca where plays the LEB Oro matches until 2007-08 season with the sponsorship name Palma Aqua Màgica. Palma reaches the play-offs two times in a row.

After the 2007-08 season, due to economic problems, Palma Aqua Màgica renounces to play in LEB Oro and comes back to balearic divisions.

== Season by season ==
Season	Tier	Division	Pos.	W–L	Cup competitions	
1983–04	Lower divisions					
2004–05	3	LEB 2	2nd	26–12		
2005–06	2	LEB	8th	17–20	Copa Príncipe	SF
2006–07	2	LEB	8th	20–18		
2007–08	2	LEB Oro	13th	13–21		

== Notable players ==
- (United States) Lou Roe
- (United States) Robert Battle
- (Spain) Xavi Vallmajó
