= Gandía BA =

Bàsquet Gandia
- Leagues: Liga EBA
- Founded: 1981
- Dissolved: 2013
- Arena: Municipal de Gandía
- Location: Gandía, Valencian Community
- Team colors: Magenta and gold
- President: Mónica Nogueroles
- Vice-president(s): Àngel Banyuls
- Head coach: Quique Roig
- Championships: 1 Copa EBA championship
Home	Away

Gandia Bàsquet Athletic is a professional basketball team based in Gandia, Valencian Community and plays in the Municipal de Gandia, in Liga EBA.

In 2013, the club was dissolved and loaned its rights to the new creation club in the city called Units pel Bàsquet Gandia.

== Season by season ==
Season	Tier	Division	Pos.	W–L	Cup competitions	
1991–92	3	2ª División	1st	–		
1992–93	2	1ª División	8th	19–21		
1993–94	2	1ª División	16th	10–20		
1994–95	2	Liga EBA	5th	19–17		
1995–96	3	Liga EBA	8th	15–17		
1996–97	3	Liga EBA	1st		Copa EBA	C
1997–98	3	Liga EBA	5th	14–11		
1998–99	3	Liga EBA	2nd	27–8		
1999–00	3	Liga EBA	3rd (Note: Was invited to join the newly created LEB 2.)	20–6		
2000–01	3	LEB 2	7th	18–16		
2001–02	3	LEB 2	3rd	24–14		
2002–03	3	LEB 2	6th	18–16	Copa LEB 2	SF
2003–04	3	LEB 2	8th	14–16		
2004–05	3	LEB 2	13th	11–19	Copa LEB 2	SF
2005–06	3	LEB 2	2nd	27–11		
2006–07	2	LEB	16th	16–23		
2007–08	2	LEB Oro	14th	13–21		
2008–09	2	LEB Oro	16th (Note: Resigned to continue playing in LEB Oro.)	11–23		
2009–10	4	Liga EBA	1st	24–8		
2010–11	4	Liga EBA	4th	19–11		
2011–12	3	LEB Plata	13th	5–19		
2012–13	4	Liga EBA	10th	12–16		
