= CB Ciudad de Algeciras =

Basketball club in Spain

- Founded: 1998
- Arena: Pabellón Ciudad de Algeciras (Capacity: 2,300)
- Location: Algeciras, Andalusia
- Team colors: Yellow and sky blue
- Website: Official blog
Home	Away

Club Baloncesto Ciudad de Algeciras, officially named as Agrupación Deportiva Carteia, is a basketball club in the city of Algeciras in southern Spain.

== History ==
The club was formed in 1998 and managed to work its way up the league from modest beginnings. Financial issues hit the club in 2004, forcing it to sell the berth in LEB Oro to Bruesa GBC in the next summer, but the club still creates a range of competitive teams.

Nowadays, the club continues playing in the youth competition of Andalusia.

== Season to season ==
Season	Tier	Division	Pos.	W–L	Cup competitions	
1998–99	3	Liga EBA	13th	14–20		
1999–00	3	Liga EBA	1st (Note: Was invited to join the newly created LEB 2.)	22–6	Copa EBA	R1
2000–01	3	LEB 2	5th	20–14		
2001–02	3	LEB 2	14th	11–22		
2002–03	3	LEB 2	2nd	23–14		
2003–04	2	LEB	15th	14–20		
2004–05	2	LEB	14th (Note: Sold its place in LEB Oro to Bruesa GBC.)	13–21		
2005–11	Did not enter any competition					
2011–12	6	Provincial	11th	4–18		

== Notable players ==
- (Spain) Ricardo Guillén
- (United States) Aaron Swinson
