= 2006–07 LEB season =

Spanish basketball league season

The 2006–2007 LEB season was the 11th season of the Liga Española de Baloncesto, second tier of the Spanish basketball.

== Standings ==
#	Teams	P	W	L	PF	PA	Qualification or relegation
1	Alerta Cantabria	34	23	11	2.615	2.517	Playoffs
2	Climalia León	34	22	12	2.723	2.605	Playoffs
3	Basket CAI Zaragoza	34	21	13	2.855	2.796	Playoffs
4	Villa de Los Barrios	34	20	14	2.725	2.617	Playoffs
5	Ricoh Manresa	34	19	15	2.766	2.682	Playoffs
6	Drac Inca	34	19	15	2.837	2.791	Playoffs
7	Palma Aqua Magica	34	19	15	2.731	2.689	Playoffs
8	Ciudad de Huelva	34	18	16	2.638	2.614	Playoffs
9	Leche Río Breogán	34	17	17	2.745	2.737	
10	Plus Pujol Lleida	34	17	17	2.588	2.626	
11	UB La Palma	34	16	18	2.678	2.722	
12	CB L'Hospitalet	34	16	18	2.759	2.775	
13	Melilla Baloncesto	34	15	19	2.507	2.521	
14	Tenerife Rural	34	14	20	2.625	2.668	
15	Autocid Ford Burgos	34	13	21	2.639	2.719	
16	Calefacciones Farho Gijón	34	13	21	2.566	2.701	Relegation playoffs
17	Aguas de Gandía Valencia	34	13	21	2.774	2.862	Relegation playoffs
18	CB Tarragona	34	11	23	2.603	2.732	Relegated to LEB-2

== LEB Playoffs ==
Quarter Finals
1	Alerta Cantabria	1
8	Ciudad de Huelva	3
4	Villa de Los Barrios	0
5	Ricoh Manresa	3
2	Climalia León	3
7	Palma Aqua Magica	1
3	Basket CAI Zaragoza	3
6	Drac Inca	0

SemiFinals
8	Ciudad de Huelva	0
5	Ricoh Manresa	3
2	Climalia León	3
3	Basket CAI Zaragoza	2

Finals
5	Ricoh Manresa	1
2	Climalia León	0

=== Playoff seedings, results, and schedules ===
==== Quarter-finals ====
(1) Alerta Cantabria (23-11) vs. (8) Ciudad de Huelva (18-16)
Ciudad de Huelva win the series 1-3

- Game 1 May 3 @ Santander: Alerta Cantabria 74, Ciudad de Huelva 67
- Game 2 May 5 @ Santander: Alerta Cantabria 69, Ciudad de Huelva 78
- Game 3 May 8 @ Huelva: Ciudad de Huelva 80, Alerta Cantabria 76
- Game 4 May 10 @ Huelva: Ciudad de Huelva 76, Alerta Cantabria 74

(4) Villa de Los Barrios (20-14) vs. (5) Ricoh Manresa (19-15)
Ricoh Manresa win the series 0-3

- Game 1 May 3 @ Los Barrios: Villa de Los Barrios 67, Ricoh Manresa 74
- Game 2 May 5 @ Los Barrios: Villa de Los Barrios 69, Ricoh Manresa 72
- Game 3 May 8 @ Manresa: Ricoh Manresa 90, Villa de Los Barrios 80

(2) Climalia León (22-12) vs. (7) Palma Aqua Magica (19-15)
Climalia León win the series 3-2

- Game 1 May 3 @ León: Climalia León 87, Palma Aqua Magica 62
- Game 2 May 5 @ León: Climalia León 99, Palma Aqua Magica 77
- Game 3 May 8 @ Palma de Mallorca: Palma Aqua Magica 94, Climalia León 89
- Game 4 May 10 @ Palma de Mallorca: Palma Aqua Magica 92, Climalia León 66
- Game 5 May 12 @ León: Climalia León 85, Palma Aqua Magica 75

(3) Basket CAI Zaragoza (21-13) vs. (6) Drac Inca (19-15)
Basket CAI Zaragoza win the series 3-0

- Game 1 May 3 @ Zaragoza: Basket CAI Zaragoza 100, Drac Inca 62
- Game 2 May 5 @ Zaragoza: Basket CAI Zaragoza 87, Drac Inca 74
- Game 3 May 8 @ Inca: Drac Inca 67, Basket CAI Zaragoza 68

==== Semifinals ====
(5) Ricoh Manresa (19-15) vs. (8) Ciudad de Huelva (18-16)
Ricoh Manresa win the series 3-0

- Game 1 17 May @ Manresa: Ricoh Manresa 83, Ciudad de Huelva 64
- Game 2 19 May @ Manresa: Ricoh Manresa 85, Ciudad de Huelva 59
- Game 3 22 May @ Huelva: Ciudad de Huelva 72, Ricoh Manresa 84

Ricoh Manresa: Promoted to Liga ACB.

(2) Climalia León (22-12) vs. (3) Basket CAI Zaragoza (21-13)
The series is tied 2-2

- Game 1 17 May @ León: Climalia León 89, Basket CAI Zaragoza 75
- Game 2 19 May @ León: Climalia León 73, Basket CAI Zaragoza 88
- Game 3 22 May @ Zaragoza: Basket CAI Zaragoza 79, Climalia León 73
- Game 4 24 May @ Zaragoza: Basket CAI Zaragoza 73, Climalia León 82
- Game 5 26 May @ León: Climalia León 89, Basket CAI Zaragoza 79

Climalia León: Promoted to Liga ACB.

==== LEB Finals ====
These two teams are already promoted to the league ACB.

(2) Climalia León (22-12) vs. (5) Ricoh Manresa (19-15)

- Game 1 June 6 @ León: Climalia León 88, Ricoh Manresa 94
- Ricoh Manresa: League LEB CHAMPION
- Climalia León and Ricoh Manresa: Promoted to League ACB

== Relegation playoffs ==
Finals
16	Farho Gijón	2
17	Aguas de Valencia	3

Calefacciones Farho Gijón, relegated to LEB Plata.

== TV coverage ==
- Teledeporte, FEBTV, Popular TV, Canal 33 and autonomous channels.

== See also ==
- Liga Española de Baloncesto
