= Sergio Llorente =

Spanish basketball player

No. 24 – Fibwi Palma
- Position: Point guard
- League: Primera FEB

Personal information
- Born: September 13, 1990 (age 36) Madrid, Spain
- Listed height: 1.84 m (6 ft 0 in)

Career information
- Playing career: 2010–present

Career history
- 2010–2011: Lobe Huesca
- 2011–2012: Óbila
- 2012–2013: CEBA Guadalajara
- 2013–2014: Força Lleida
- 2014–2015: Palma Air Europa
- 2015–2016: Breogán
- 2016–2017: Bilbao Basket
- 2017–2018: Fuenlabrada
- 2018–2020: Oviedo
- 2020–2021: Melilla
- 2021: Spirou
- 2021–2023: Circus Brussels
- 2023: Bilbao Basket
- 2023–2024: Ourense
- 2024–2025: HLA Alicante
- 2025: Menorca
- 2025–2026: HLA Alicante
- 2026–present: Fibwi Palma

Career highlights
- Copa LEB Plata MVP (2013)

Sergio Antonio Llorente Paz (born September 13, 1990) is a Spanish professional basketball player for Fibwi Palma of the Primera FEB. He plays in the point guard position.

== Career ==
Son of the former Real Madrid player José Luis Llorente, he started his career in 2010 at LEB Plata team Lobe Huesca, where he achieved the promotion to LEB Oro.

Despite this success, Llorente continued playing in LEB Plata until 2013, when he signed with Força Lleida.

Three years later, in summer 2016, Llorente signed a temporary contract with Dominion Bilbao Basket, for helping the team during the preseason but thanks to his great performances, he agreed a one-year contract with the Basque squad.

Llorente played for Oviedo between 2018 and 2020. During the 2019–20 season, he averaged 7.3 points, 2.5 rebounds and 5.2 assists per game. On September 14, 2020, Llorente signed with Club Melilla Baloncesto of the LEB Oro.

On January 25, 2021, he has signed with Spirou of the Pro Basketball League.

On December 26, 2021, after a monthlong trial, he joins Phoenix Brussels for the rest of the 2021-22 BNXT League season. In July 2022 Llorente renewed his contract for an additional year in Brussels.

In October 2025, he signed for HLA Alicante of the Primera FEB.

== Titles ==
=== CEBA Guadalajara ===
- Copa LEB Plata: (1)
  - 2013
