= Xavi Rey =

Spanish basketball player

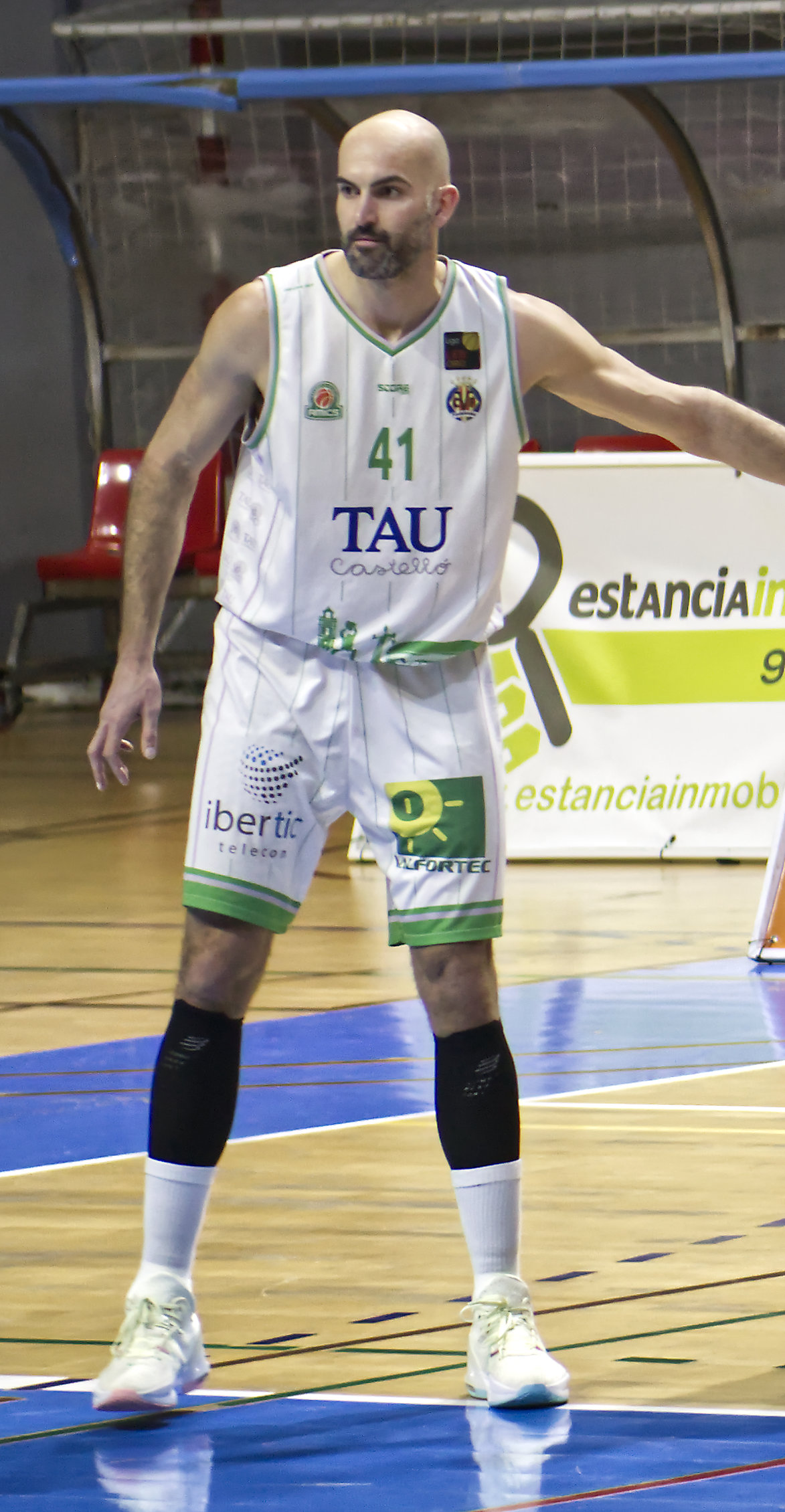

Personal information
- Born: 13 July 1987 (age 39) Barcelona, Spain
- Listed height: 2.10 m (6 ft 11 in)
- Listed weight: 114 kg (251 lb)

Career information
- NBA draft: 2009: undrafted
- Playing career: 2005–2024
- Position: Center

Career history
- 2007–2008: Manresa
- 2008–2009: FC Barcelona
- 2009–2010: Sevilla
- 2010–2014: Gran Canaria
- 2014–2015: Canarias
- 2015–2016: Estudiantes
- 2016–2017: Fuenlabrada
- 2017: Manresa
- 2018: Zaragoza
- 2018–2019: Benfica
- 2019: Olimpia Milano
- 2019–2020: Iberojet Palma
- 2020–2021: Palencia
- 2021–2022: Prat
- 2022–2024: AB Castelló

Xavier "Xavi" Rey Sanuy (born 13 July 1987) is a Spanish former professional basketball player.

== Professional career ==
Rey saw action against the Los Angeles Lakers in an NBA preseason game, despite having not yet made the regular rotation of FC Barcelona in the Spanish ACB League.

In the summer 2019 he joins Olimpia Milano for the summer preparation due to the missing players that were playing in the Fiba World Cup; on 24 September, day of the starting 2019/2020 season of the Italian Serie A, Rey receives the offer to stay in Milan for the rest of the season. Less than a month later, he reaches a mutual agreement with the club and, on 19 October, Milan and Rey part ways. He did not play any official game with Milan.

Rey signs with Iberojet Palma in the LEB Oro on 20 October 2019.

== Spain national teams ==
Rey competed internationally with the junior Spain national team, and then with the senior Spain national team at the EuroBasket 2011 prep games. He played in some friendly games but was not chosen to play in the main tournament. He was selected to play at EuroBasket 2013.
