= Euskal Kopa =

- Founded: 2011; 14 years ago
- Country: Basque Country (Spain)
- Confederation: FIBA Europe
- Current champions: Kirolbet Baskonia (4th title) (2022–23)
- Website: BasketBasko.com

The Basque Cup, more commonly known as Euskal Kopa, (Note: Basque pronunciation: [eus̺kal kopa].) is the regional preseason basketball cup competition that has been organized by the Basque Basketball Federation since 2011, in the Basque Country, Spain.

Nowadays, the teams that play in this preseason cup competition are the Liga ACB, LEB Oro, LEB Plata and Liga EBA teams.

== Performance by club ==
Club	Winners	Runners-up	Winning years
Baskonia	4	0	2010–11, 2011–12, 2019–20, 2022–23
Araberri	3	2	2013–14 (FEB), 2015–16 (FEB), 2016–17 (LEB)
Bilbao Basket	3	2	2012–13, 2017–18, 2018–19
Iraurgi	3	1	2014–15 (FEB), 2017–18 (LEB), 2019–20 (LEB)
CB Santurtzi SK	1	3	2017–18 (EBA)
Easo Loquillo	1	1	2016–17 (EBA)
Mondragon Unibertsitatea	1	0	2018–19 (EBA)
Gipuzkoa Basket	0	6	

== Euskal Kopa history ==
=== 2010–11 Euskal Kopa ===
Semi-final
San Sebastián, 14 April 2011
Lagun Aro GBC	86
Bizkaia Bilbao Basket	76

Final
Vitoria-Gasteiz, 28 April 2011
Caja Laboral	90
Lagun Aro GBC	65

=== 2011–12 Euskal Kopa ===
Semi-final
Vitoria-Gasteiz, 27 September 2011
Caja Laboral	83
Lagun Aro GBC	81

Final
Bilbao, 11 May 2012
Gescrap Bizkaia	65
Caja Laboral	69

=== 2012–13 Euskal Kopa ===
Semi-final
Bilbao, 24 September 2012
Gescrap Bizkaia	78
Caja Laboral	75

Final
San Sebastián, 23 October 2012
Lagun Aro GBC	62
Gescrap Bizkaia	78

=== 2013–14 Euskal Kopa ===
Pos	Grp	Team	Pld	W	L	PF	PA	PD	Pts
1	C	Aurteneche Maquinaria Euskadi (C)	2	2	0	183	121	+62	4
2	B	Azpeitia Azkoitia ISB	2	2	0	160	109	+51	4
3	A	Cafés Aitona	2	2	0	129	102	+27	4
4	C	Zornotza ST	2	1	1	156	148	+8	3
5	A	CB Santurtzi SK	2	1	1	115	112	+3	3
6	B	Centro de Esudios Mikeldi	2	1	1	117	157	−40	3
7	A	Askartza-Claret	2	0	2	104	134	−30	2
8	B	Easo Pastas Arruabarrena	2	0	2	115	126	−11	2
9	C	UPV Álava	2	0	2	103	173	−70	2

Updated to match(es) played on 21 September 2013. Source: FEB.es
(C) Champions

=== 2014–15 Euskal Kopa ===
Pos	Grp	Team	Pld	W	L	PF	PA	PD	Pts
1	A	Azpeitia Azkoitia ISB (C)	2	2	0	174	132	+42	4
2	C	Sáenz Horeca Araberri	2	2	0	154	118	+36	4
3	B	Zornotza ST	2	2	0	175	141	+34	4
4	C	Easo	2	1	1	142	122	+20	3
5	A	Centro de Esudios Mikeldi	2	1	1	145	144	+1	3
6	B	Mondragon Unibertsitatea	2	1	1	134	160	−26	3
7	B	CB Santurtzi SK	2	0	2	160	168	−8	2
8	A	TAKE Tolosa	2	0	2	123	166	−43	2
9	C	Askartza-Claret	2	0	2	94	150	−56	2

Updated to match(es) played on 21 September 2014. Source: FEB.es
(C) Champions

=== 2015–16 Euskal Kopa ===
==== Group A ====
Pos	Team	Pld	W	L	PF	PA	PD	Pts	Qualification
1	Zornotza ST	3	3	0	282	200	+82	6	Qualification to the final
2	Sáenz Horeca Araberri	3	2	1	265	202	+63	5	Qualification to the final
3	Easo	3	1	2	197	234	−37	4	
4	Mondragon Unibertsitatea	3	0	3	171	279	−108	3	

Updated to match(es) played on 20 September 2015. Source: FEB.es

==== Group B ====
Pos	Team	Pld	W	L	PF	PA	PD	Pts	Qualification
1	Sammic ISB	3	3	0	218	152	+66	6	Qualification to the final
2	CB Santurtzi SK	3	2	1	206	167	+39	5	Qualification to the final
3	TAKE Tolosa	3	1	2	177	200	−23	4	
4	Leihoak Zarautz ZKE	3	0	3	152	234	−82	3	

Updated to match(es) played on 20 September 2015. Source: FEB.es

==== Final ====
Semi-finals
Zornotza ST	78
CB Santurtzi SK	80
Sammic ISB	61
Sáenz Horeca Araberri	73

Final
CB Santurtzi SK	62
Sáenz Horeca Araberri	71
Third place
Zornotza ST	78
Sammic ISB	69

=== 2016–17 Euskal Kopa ===
==== Euskal Kopa LEB ====
Semi-finals
24 September 2016
RETAbet.es GBC	87
Zornotza ST	72
24 September 2016
Sáenz Horeca Araberri	70
Sammic ISB	65

Final
25 September 2016
RETAbet.es GBC	75
Sáenz Horeca Araberri	79
Third place
25 September 2016
Zornotza ST	71
Sammic ISB	67

Source: FEB.es

==== Euskal Kopa EBA ====
Pos	Team	Pld	W	L	PF	PA	PD	Pts	Qualification
1	Easo Loquillo	4	4	0	290	181	+109	8	Qualification to the final
2	CB Santurtzi SK	4	3	1	257	222	+35	7	Qualification to the final
3	Ulacia Grupo	4	1	3	254	272	−18	5	
4	TAKE Tolosa	4	1	3	196	274	−78	5	
5	Mondragon Unibertsitatea	4	1	3	244	292	−48	5	

Updated to match(es) played on 25 September 2016. Source: FEB.es

===== Final =====
Final
2 October 2016
Easo Loquillo	71
CB Santurtzi SK	50

Source: FEB.es

=== 2017–18 Euskal Kopa ===
==== Euskal Kopa ACB ====
Final
2 September 2017
RETAbet Bilbao Basket	83
Gipuzkoa Basket	81

Source: BasketBasko

==== Euskal Kopa LEB ====
Pos	Team	Pld	W	L	PF	PA	PD	Pts
1	Sammic Hostelería (C)	2	2	0	184	129	+55	4
2	Sáenz Horeca Araberri	2	1	1	145	158	−13	3
3	Baskonia B	2	0	2	149	191	−42	2

Source: FEB.es
(C) Champions

==== Euskal Kopa EBA ====
Pos	Team	Pld	W	L	PF	PA	PD	Pts	Qualification
1	CB Santurtzi SK	4	4	0	279	237	+42	8	Qualification to the final
2	Easo Loquillo	4	3	1	291	226	+65	7	Qualification to the final
3	Ordizia Basoa Banaketak	4	2	2	257	288	−31	6	
4	Mondragon Unibertsitatea	4	1	3	251	271	−20	5	
5	Ulacia Grupo	4	0	4	223	279	−56	4	

Source: FEB.es

===== Final =====
Final
1 October 2017
CB Santurtzi SK	58
Easo Loquillo	55

Source: FEB.es

=== 2018–19 Euskal Kopa ===
==== Euskal Kopa ====
First round
8 September 2018
Baskonia B	64
Zornotza ST	89

Second round
16 September 2018
Juaristi ISB	65
RETAbet Bilbao Basket	91
16 September 2018
Zornotza ST	106
Sáenz Horeca Araberri	108

Semi-final
21 September 2018
RETAbet Bilbao Basket	78
Sáenz Horeca Araberri	75

Final
23 September 2018
Delteco GBC	69
RETAbet Bilbao Basket	89

Source: FEB.es, BasketBasko, BasketBasko

==== Euskal Kopa EBA ====
Pos	Team	Pld	W	L	PF	PA	PD	Pts	Qualification
1	CB Santurtzi SK	4	4	0	295	255	+40	8	Qualification to the final
2	Mondragon Unibertsitatea	4	2	2	316	268	+48	6	Qualification to the final
3	Easo	4	2	2	234	256	−22	6	
4	Goierri Iparagirre 2020	4	1	3	219	266	−47	5	
5	Ordizia Basoa Banaketak	4	1	3	251	270	−19	5	

Source: FEB.es

===== Final =====
Final
7 October 2018
CB Santurtzi SK	57
Mondragon	62

Source: BasketBasko

=== 2019 Euskal Kopa ===
==== Euskal Kopa ACB ====
Final
14 September 2019
Kirolbet Baskonia	66
RETAbet Bilbao Basket	55

Source: BasketBasko

==== Euskal Kopa LEB ====
Semi-final
6 September 2019
Zornotza ST	70
Juaristi ISB	81

Final
8 September 2019
Delteco GBC	71
Juaristi ISB	80

Source: BasketBasko

==== Euskal Kopa EBA ====
===== Group A =====
Pos	Team	Pld	W	L	PF	PA	PD	Pts	Qualification
1	Baskonia B	2	2	0	169	147	+22	4	Qualification to the final
2	Mondragon Unibersitatea	2	1	1	144	145	−1	3	Qualification to the final
3	Ulacia Zarautz	2	0	2	132	153	−21	2	

Source: BasketBasko

===== Group B =====
Pos	Team	Pld	W	L	PF	PA	PD	Pts	Qualification
1	CB Santurtzi SK	3	2	1	229	203	+26	5	Qualification to the final
2	Tabirako Baqué	3	2	1	213	209	+4	5	Qualification to the final
3	Easo	3	1	2	168	209	−41	4	
4	Goierri Iparragirre 2020	3	1	2	197	186	+11	4	

Source: BasketBasko

===== Final =====
Semi-finals
28 September 2019
Baskonia B	72
Tabirako Baqué	64
28 September 2019
CB Santurtzi SK	66
Mondragon Unibersitatea	69

Final
29 September 2019
Baskonia B
Mondragon Unibersitatea
Third place
29 September 2019
Tabirako Baqué
CB Santurtzi SK

Source: BasketBasko

=== 2020 Euskal Kopa ===
==== Euskal Kopa ACB ====
Final
30 August 2020
TD Systems Baskonia	87
RETAbet Bilbao Basket	77

=== 2021 Euskal Kopa ===
==== Euskal Kopa ACB ====
Final
12 September 2021
Bitci Baskonia	68
Bilbao Basket	93
