= Brandon Sebirumbi =

American basketball player

Personal information
- Born: May 15, 1990 (age 36) Fort Worth, Texas, U.S.
- Listed height: 6 ft 9 in (2.06 m)
- Listed weight: 230 lb (104 kg)

Career information
- High school: Central (Fort Worth, Texas)
- College: Furman (2008–2012)
- Playing career: 2012–present
- Position: Forward

Career history
- 2012–2013: Sampaense Basket
- 2013–2014: Navarra
- 2014–2015: Cáceres
- 2015–2016: Óbila
- 2016–2017: Aomori Wat's
- 2018: Cockburn Cougars
- 2018–2019: Morón
- 2023: Gaiteros del Zulia
- 2023: City Oilers

Career highlights
- LEB Plata champion (2015)

Brandon Alan Sebirumbi (born May 15, 1990) is a Ugandan American professional basketball player. He played college basketball for the Furman Paladins.

== Early life ==
Sebirumbi was born in Fort Worth, Texas, where he attended Central High School.

== College career ==
Sebirumbi played four years of college basketball for the Furman Paladins between 2008 and 2012. In 123 games, he averaged 7.3 points and 3.9 rebounds per game.

== Professional career ==
Sebirumbi played for Sampaense Basket in Portugal in 2012–13 before playing in Spain over the next three seasons for Navarra (2013–14), Cáceres (2014–15), and Óbila (2015–16). He moved to Japan to play for Aomori Wat's in the 2016–17 season.

Sebirumbi joined the Cockburn Cougars of the State Basketball League in Australia for the 2018 season. In 21 games, he averaged 16.95 points, 8.14 rebounds and 1.52 assists per game.

Sebirumbi returned to Spain for the 2018–19 season, joining Morón.

In 2023, Sebirumbi played for Gaiteros del Zulia in Venezuela. He later joined the City Oilers of the Ugandan National Basketball League, where he played in five BAL 2024 qualifying games in November 2023.

== National team career ==
On August 5, 2015, Sebirumbi was named in the final roster for the Uganda national basketball team ahead of AfroBasket 2015.

Sebirumbi played for Uganda during 2019 FIBA Basketball World Cup qualifiers and AfroBasket 2025 qualifiers.

== See also ==
- Ugandan Americans
