= 2010–11 Liga EBA season =

17th season of the Liga EBA

The 2010–2011 Liga EBA season is the 17th edition of the Liga EBA. This is the fourth division of Spanish basketball. Four teams will be promoted to LEB Plata. The regular season (and all games before the final playoffs) started on 29 September 2010, and finished on 30 April 2011.

== Format ==
=== Regular season ===
The 80 teams are divided in five groups by geographical criteria. Group A is also divided in two:

- Group A-A: Cantabria, Basque Country, La Rioja and Castile and León (except CB Zamora).
- Group A-B: Galicia, Asturias and CB Zamora.
- Group B: Madrid, Castilla–La Mancha and Canary Islands.
- Group C: Catalonia and Aragón.
- Group D: Andalusia and Extremadura.
- Group E: Valencian Community, Region of Murcia and Balearic Islands.

=== Group A Second phase ===
The three best teams of groups A-A and A-B play a double leg play-off, and the winners qualify to the final play-off.

=== Final play-off ===
The three best teams of each group plus a fourth qualified decided with special criteria will play a double leg play-off. From these 16 teams, only four will be promoted to LEB Plata.

== Results ==
=== Group A ===
==== Group A-A ====
#	Teams	GP	W	L	PF	PA
1	Aurteneche Maquinaria	22	21	1	1864	1519
2	Fidalgo Vecino	22	17	5	1577	1526
3	Ventanas Arsán Estela	22	14	8	1843	1672
4	Zornotza Saskibaloi Taldea	22	12	10	1715	1735
5	Deportes Ferrer Santa María	22	12	10	1554	1541
6	Hormigones Sierra Villamuriel	22	11	11	1677	1687
7	Cafés Aitona	22	11	11	1638	1590
8	Pas Piélagos	22	9	13	1699	1694
9	Universidad de Valladolid	22	9	13	1726	1750
10	SAB Torrelavega	22	6	16	1513	1679
11	Universidad de Burgos	22	6	16	1563	1709
12	Tabirako Baqué	22	4	18	1503	1770

==== Group A-B ====
#	Teams	GP	W	L	PF	PA
1	Recinor Ferrol	20	19	1	1604	1297
2	Marín Peixegalego	20	15	5	1700	1472
3	Carballo Basket	20	15	5	1513	1378
4	Establecimientos Otero	20	11	9	1464	1375
5	Grupo INEC Zamora	20	11	9	1449	1402
6	Estudiantes Lugo Leyma Natura	20	9	11	1433	1452
7	Universidad de Oviedo	20	9	11	1447	1473
8	Ourense Capital Termal	20	8	12	1443	1544
9	CB Chantada Galicia Vento	20	8	12	1396	1451
10	Obradoiro CAB B	20	5	15	1207	1445
11	Beirasar Rosalía	20	0	20	1296	1663

==== Second round play-offs ====
Game		1st leg	2 ng leg
Carballo Basket	Aurteneche Maquinaria	56–74	83–52
Marín Peixegalego	Fidalgo Vecino	69–59	87–83
Ventanas Arsán Estela	Recinor Ferrol Baloncesto	84–61	85–81

The three winners will join the final promotion play-offs.

==== Group A final standings ====
After the regular season of the groups A-A and A-B, the team qualified in the same position play a double game play-off to determine their final position in the table.

Pos	Team
1	Aurteneche Maquinaria
2	Marín Peixegalego
3	Ventanas Arsán Estela
4	Recinor Ferrol Baloncesto
5	Fidalgo Vecino
6	Carballo Basket

Pos	Team
7	Zornotza Saskibaloi Taldea
8	Establecimientos Otero
9	Grupo INEC Zamora
10	Deportes Ferrer Santa María
11	Estudiantes Lugo Leyma Natura
12	Hormigones Sierra Villamuriel

Pos	Team
13	Cafés Aitona
14	Universidad de Oviedo
15	Ourense Capital Termal
16	Pas Piélagos
17	CB Chantada Galicia Vento
18	Universidad de Valladolid

Pos	Team
19	SAB Torrelavega
20	Obradoiro CAB B
21	Beirasar Rosalía
22	Universidad de Burgos
23	Tabirako Baqué

=== Group B ===
#	Teams	GP	W	L	PF	PA
1	Tenerife Baloncesto	30	23	7	2403	2161
2	Real Madrid B	30	22	8	2121	1863
3	Baloncesto Torrejón	30	20	10	2385	2168
4	Seranco Toshiba Polígono	30	18	12	2166	2151
5	Reale Ciudad Real	30	18	12	2344	2256
6	Real Canoe NC	30	18	12	2179	2085
7	Espacio Torrelodones	30	16	14	2201	2173
8	Dominicas Santa Cruz de La Palma	30	16	14	2154	2156
9	CB Aridane	30	16	14	2154	2156
10	Euroconsult Alcobendas	30	13	17	2410	2491
11	Eurocolegio Casvi	30	13	17	1928	1962
12	Asefa Estudiantes B	30	13	17	2294	2335
13	CB Gran Canaria B	30	11	19	2034	2182
14	Albacete Baloncesto Cinco	30	9	21	2219	2323
15	Fuenlabrada-Getafe	30	7	23	2163	2482
16	Ferretería San Isidro	30	6	24	1978	2242

=== Group C ===
#	Teams	GP	W	L	PF	PA
1	Eninter CB Santfeliuenc	30	26	4	2576	2230
2	Universitat de Vic	30	25	5	2439	2018
3	CB Cornellà	30	18	12	2340	2206
4	CE Sant Nicolau	30	18	12	2238	2090
5	Recambios Gaudí CB Mollet	30	17	13	2491	2408
6	Cosehisa Monzón	30	17	13	2429	2310
7	Eninter Barberà	30	16	14	2414	2240
8	CB Granollers	30	16	14	2234	2224
9	Sedis Mausa	30	15	15	2530	2482
10	CB Navàs	30	15	15	2351	2358
11	Monte Ducay Olivar	30	13	17	2225	2355
12	Aqua	30	12	18	2316	2485
13	Milner Arenys Bàsquet	30	11	19	2291	2362
14	CB Castellbisbal	30	10	20	2203	2305
15	Platges de Mataró	30	10	20	2251	2399
16	GAM Vila-seca	30	1	29	1895	2731

=== Group D ===
#	Teams	GP	W	L	PF	PA
1	ABP	22	20	2	1780	1433
2	Turismo de Mérida	22	19	3	1951	1643
3	Etiquetas Macho Morón	22	17	5	1697	1632
4	Movimientos y Nivelaciones Puente Genil	22	15	7	1697	1632
5	Baloncesto Córdoba 2016	22	13	9	1664	1567
6	CAM Enrique Soler	22	10	12	1659	1699
7	Castilleja Cajasol	22	8	14	1519	1572
8	Alhaurín de la Torre	22	8	14	1585	1702
9	Unicaja B	22	10	12	1500	1641
10	CB Novaschool	22	8	14	1517	1651
11	Montajes Rueda Andújar	22	6	16	1514	1760
12	Grupo Salmerón Guadix	22	0	22	1345	1630

=== Group E ===
#	Teams	GP	W	L	PF	PA
1	Platja de Palma	26	24	2	2365	1895
2	Festival de Cine L'Alfàs	26	21	5	2031	1806
3	CD Alcázar	26	18	8	2111	2000
4	Gandía Bàsquet	26	16	10	1948	1879
5	CEB Llíria	26	15	11	2060	2041
6	CB Alginet	26	15	11	2058	1907
7	Arroz Dacsa Almàssera	26	12	14	2090	2053
8	Aguas de Calpa Ifach Calpe	26	12	14	1946	1954
9	AB Castelló	26	11	15	1901	1982
10	Alaior Menorcarentals.com Coinga	26	11	15	1992	2071
11	Valencia Basket Club B	26	9	17	1765	1902
12	CB L'Horta Godella	26	7	19	1739	1980
13	Adesavi San Vicente	26	6	20	1858	2076
14	Bàsquet Mallorca B	26	5	21	1773	2091

== Final playoffs ==
16 teams will join the Final play-offs. Four of them will promote to LEB Plata.

Semifinals will be played on 14-15 and 21–22 May.

Semifinals
3D	Etiquetas Macho Morón	76	74	150
1E	Platja de Palma	85	88	173
3C	CB Cornellà	78	67	145
2A	Marín Peixegalego	81	73	154

Finals
2A	Marín Peixegalego	84	65	149
1E	Platja de Palma	82	89	191

Semifinals
5D	Córdoba 2016^{1}	57	57	114
2E	Festival de Cine L'Alfàs	66	83	149
3B	Baloncesto Torrejón	65	77	142
1A	Aurteneche Maquinaria	58	91	149

Finals
2E	Festival de Cine L'Alfàs	67	69	136
1A	Aurteneche Maquinaria	61	79	140

Semifinals
3E	CD Alcázar	64	74	138
1C	Eninter CB Santfeliuenc	82	84	166
2B	Real Madrid B	70	55	125
1D	ABP	79	65	144

Finals
1D	ABP	64	78	142
1C	Eninter CB Santfeliuenc	60	93	153

Semifinals
4E	Gandía Bàsquet	67	84	151
1B	Tenerife Baloncesto	66	78	144
3A	Ventanas Arsán Estela	61	74	134
2C	Universitat de Vic	87	96	183

Finals
4E	Gandía Bàsquet	66	58	124
2A	Universitat de Vic	61	61	122

^{1}After the renounce of Turismo de Mérida, Córdoba 2016 accepted the invitation of the Federation to join the playoffs. Before them, the berth was offered to MyN Puente Genil, but the club denied it.

=== Playoffs table ===
Pos	Team
1	Aurteneche Maquinaria
2	Platja de Palma
3	CB Santfeliuenc
4	Gandía Bàsquet
5	ABP
6	Universitat de Vic
7	Festival de Cine L'Alfàs
8	Marín Peixegalego

Pos	Team
9	Tenerife Baloncesto
10	Real Madrid B
11	Baloncesto Torrejón
12	Etiquetas Macho Morón
13	CD Alcázar
14	Ventanas Arsán Estela
15	CB Cornellà
16	Córdoba 2016
