= Karamo Jawara =

Norwegian basketball player

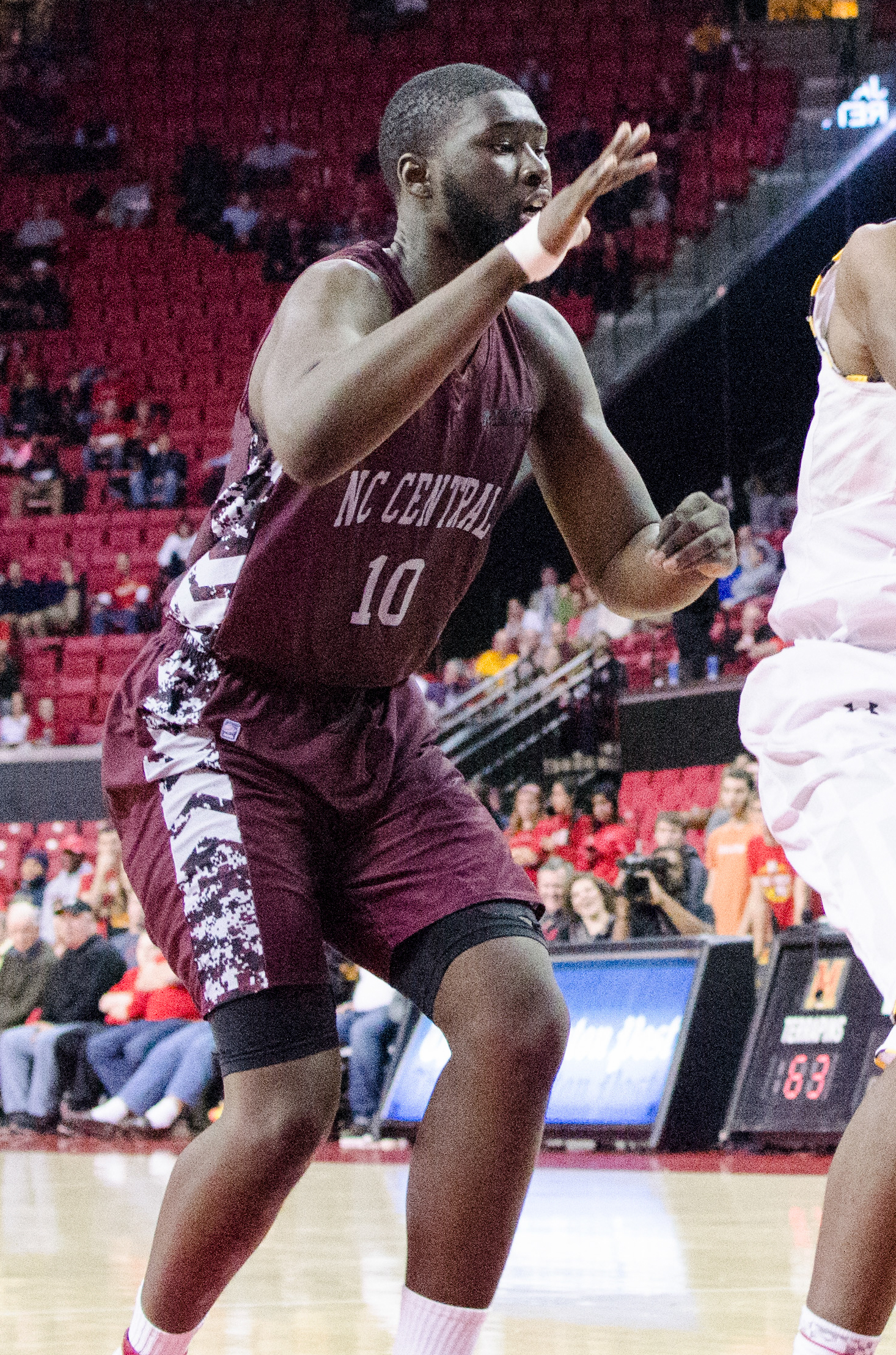

Club Ourense Baloncesto
- Position: Forward
- League: LEB Oro

Personal information
- Born: 25 June 1991 (age 35) Bergen, Norway
- Listed height: 6 ft 8 in (2.03 m)
- Listed weight: 240 lb (109 kg)

Career information
- High school: Olsvikasen Skole (Bergen, Hordaland)
- College: North Carolina Central (2011–2015)
- NBA draft: 2015: undrafted
- Playing career: 2015–present

Career history
- 2015: U-BT Cluj-Napoca
- 2015–2016: Apollon Patras
- 2016–2017: Machites Doxas Pefkon
- 2017–2018: Cambados Xuven
- 2018: Iberojet Palma
- 2018: Germani Brescia
- 2018: Halifax Hurricanes
- 2019: ETHA Engomis
- 2019–2020: Gipuzkoa
- 2020–2021: Iberojet Palma
- 2021–2022: Bàsquet Girona
- 2022–2023: Estudiantes
- 2023–present: Club Ourense Baloncesto

Career highlights
- Copa Princesa de Asturias (2020); LEB Plata Top Rebounder (2018); Second-team All-MEAC (2015); Meac regular season Champion 2015; NCAA Tournament 2014; Meac champion 2014; National Champion in U16, U18 and U20 in Norway; MVP in U18 and U20 National Championship

Karamo Jawara (born 25 June 1991) is a Gambian-Norwegian professional basketball player for Club Ourense Baloncesto of the LEB Oro.

== College career ==
Jawara played college basketball for North Carolina Central. As a senior, he averaged 7.6 points, 6.4 rebounds, and 2.3 assists per game, shooting 44.3 percent from the floor.

== Professional career ==
In the years 2015–2017, he played professionally in Romania and Greece.

In 2017, he became the Most Valuable Player of Spain's LEB Plata. Thereafter, he joined Cambados Xuven in the LEB Oro. During the 2018–19 season Jawara played for ETHA Engomis of the Cypriot league, averaging 10.4 points, 8.7 rebounds, 4.3 assists and 1.5 steals per game. He joined Gipuzkoa in 2019 and averaged 5.0 points and 3.4 rebounds per game. On October 8, 2020, Jawara signed with Iberojet Palma. He averaged 8.5 points, 5.5 rebounds and 2.4 assists per game.

On July 14, 2021, Jawara signed with Bàsquet Girona.

On July 26, 2023, he joined Club Ourense Baloncesto of the LEB Oro.

== Norwigean national team ==
He is a member of the Norwegian national basketball team.
