= Víctor Arteaga =

Spanish basketball player

No. 77 – CB Menorca
- Position: Center
- League: Primera FEB

Personal information
- Born: 7 July 1992 (age 34) Cuenca, Spain
- Listed height: 2.13 m (7 ft 0 in)
- Listed weight: 109 kg (240 lb)

Career information
- Playing career: 2010–present

Career history
- 2010–2012: Real Madrid B
- 2012: →Valladolid
- 2012–2013: CEBA Guadalajara
- 2013–2016: Murcia
- 2013–2014: →Força Lleida
- 2016–2021: Estudiantes
- 2021–2022: Andorra
- 2022–2023: Breogán
- 2023–2025: Menorca
- 2025: Mineros de Zacatecas
- 2025–present: Menorca

Víctor Jesús Arteaga González (born 7 July 1992), commonly known as Víctor Arteaga, is a Spanish professional basketball player for Bàsquet Menorca of the Spanish Primera FEB. He is a 2.13 m (7 ft 0 in) tall center.

== Professional career ==
Víctor Arteaga joined the junior ranks of Real Madrid Baloncesto in 2004, eventually progressing through the Infantil, Cadete A and B teams, and played for the Real Madrid reserve team in the Liga EBA. He was called up by the senior team on 23 December 2010 for a Euroleague match against Spirou Basket, playing the final three minutes and scoring his first basket for the club with 0.7 seconds remaining in the fourth quarter in a 94–45 victory.

In February 2012, he was on loan to Blancos de Rueda Valladolid, where he played his first games in Liga ACB.

Later, in September 2012, he left Real Madrid and joined CEBA Guadalajara, a new club in LEB Plata.

For the 2013–14 season, Arteaga signed with CB Murcia, which loaned him to LEB Oro team Força Lleida CE. After the end of the LEB Oro season, where he was nominated twice MVP of the week, he came back to Murcia to play in the final eight games of the league.

During the 2020–21 season, Arteaga averaged 8.3 points and 4.9 rebounds per game with Estudiantes.

On September 11, 2021, Arteaga signed a two-month deal with MoraBanc Andorra of the Liga ACB.

On August 2, 2022, he has signed with Rio Breogán of the Spanish Liga ACB.
