= Buesa =

Buesa is a surname. Notable people with the surname include:

- Fernando Buesa (1946–2000), Spanish politician
- Manuel Artime Buesa (1932–1977), Cuban-American soldier and political leader
- Martín Buesa (born 1988), Spanish basketball player

== See also ==
- Broto § Villages
