= Martín Buesa =

Spanish basketball player

Free agent
- Position: Power forward

Personal information
- Born: August 24, 1988 (age 38) Vitoria
- Listed height: 2.02 m (6 ft 8 in)

Career information
- Playing career: 2005–present

Career history
- 2005–2011: Baskonia
- 2005–2007: → Fundación Baskonia
- 2009–2011: → Fundación Baskonia
- 2011–2012: UPV Álava
- 2012–2018: Araberri

Martín Buesa (born 24 August 1988, Vitoria-Gasteiz) is a Spanish professional basketball player.

Buesa played for Caja Laboral from 2008 to 2011. After leaving the team, Buesa joined UPV Álava at Liga EBA and later, in 2012, for Araberri BC at LEB Plata.
