= 2013–14 LEB Plata season =

- League: LEB Plata
- Sport: Basketball
- Number of games: 156 (regular season)
- Number of teams: 13

Regular Season
- Season champions: Fundación Baloncesto Fuenlabrada
- Season MVP: (Nigeria) Ola Atoyebi

Playoffs
- Playoffs champions: CB Prat
- Playoffs runners-up: Palma Air Europa

Copa LEB Plata
- Champions: CB Prat
- Runners-up: Fundación Baloncesto Fuenlabrada
- Finals MVP: (Spain) Sergio Pérez Anagnostou

LEB Plata seasons
- ← 2012–13 2014–15 →

The 2013–14 LEB Plata season is the 13th season of the LEB Plata, the Spanish basketball third division. It is named Adecco Plata as its sponsored identity. The champion of the regular season will be promoted to LEB Oro. The teams between second and ninth position will play a best of five games play off, where the winner will be promoted too to the higher division.

== Competition format ==
=== Eligibility of players ===
All teams must have in their roster:

- A minimum of seven players who played in Spain during three season being between 15 and 20 years old.
- A maximum of two non-EU players. This players can be replaced by players from the EU or ACP countries.
- A maximum of two players from the EU or ACP countries.

=== Regular season ===
Each team of every division has to play with all the other teams of its division twice, once at home and the other at the opponent's stadium.

Like many other leagues in continental Europe, the Liga LEB takes a winter break once each team has played half its schedule. One feature of the league that may be unusual to North American observers is that the two halves of the season are played in the same order—that is, the order of each team's first-half fixtures is repeated in the second half of the season, with the only difference being the arenas used. This procedure is typical in Europe; it is also used by La Liga in football.

Since the first round of the second leg, if two or more teams have accumulated the same number of winning games, the criteria of tie-breaking are these:

1. Head-to-head winning games.
2. Head-to-head points coefficient.
3. Total points coefficient.

After the first leg of the season, the two top qualified teams will play the Copa Príncipe de Asturias and the leader will be the host team.

At the final of the season:

- The regular season winner promotes directly to LEB Oro.
- Teams qualified between 2nd and 9th, will join the promotion play-offs.
- Team qualified in last position is relegated directly to Liga EBA.

== Team information and location ==
New teams in the league

- Cáceres Patrimonio de la Humanidad (resigned to LEB Oro)
- Conservas de Cambados (Liga EBA champion)
- Zornotza ST (promoted from Liga EBA)
- Marín Peixegalego (achieved a vacant berth)
- Fundación Baloncesto Fuenlabrada (achieved a vacant berth)

Teams that left the league

- Unión Financiera Baloncesto Oviedo (promoted to LEB Oro)
- Clínicas Rincón (achieved a vacant berth in LEB Oro)
- Gran Canaria 2014 B (relegated to Liga EBA)
Location of teams in 2013–14 LEB Plata

Team	City	Arena	Founded	Coach
Amics Castelló	Castellón de la Plana	Pabellón Ciutat de Castelló	1994	(Spain) Antonio Ten
Araberri BC	Vitoria-Gasteiz	Polideportivo Mendizorroza	1994	(Spain) Iñaki Merino
Cafés Aitona	San Sebastián	Polideportivo Municipal J.A. Gasca	1975	(Spain) David Blanca
Azpeitia Azkoitia ISB	Azpeitia	Polideportivo Municipal	1975	(Spain) Iurgi Caminos
Cáceres Patrimonio de la Humanidad	Cáceres	Multiusos Ciudad de Cáceres	2007	(Spain) Ñete Bohígas
CB Prat	El Prat de Llobregat	Pavelló Joan Busquets	1951	(Spain) Carles Durán
CEBA Guadalajara	Guadalajara	Polideportivo San José	2011	(Spain) Javier Juárez
Conservas de Cambados	Cambados	O Pombal	1978	(Spain) Yago Casal
Fundación Baloncesto Fuenlabrada	Fuenlabrada	Polideportivo Fernando Martín	2013	(Spain) Armando Gómez
Grupo Eulen Carrefour "El Bulevar" de Ávila	Ávila	Multiusos Carlos Sastre	2001	(Spain)
Marín Peixegalego	Marín	A Raña		(Spain) Sergio Cubeiro
Palma Air Europa	Palma de Mallorca	Pabellón Toni Servera	2006	(Spain) Maties Cerdà
Zornotza ST	Amorebieta-Etxano	Polideportivo Larrea	1959	(Spain) Mikel Garitaonandia

== Regular season ==
=== League table ===
Pos	Team	Pld	W	L	PF	PA	PD	Pts	Qualification or relegation
1	Fundación Baloncesto Fuenlabrada	24	17	7	1730	1548	+182	41	Promotion to LEB Oro
2	CB Prat (C)	24	16	8	1827	1739	+88	40	Promotion playoffs
3	Palma Air Europa	24	16	8	1869	1738	+131	40	Promotion playoffs
4	Amics Castelló	24	14	10	1834	1781	+53	38	Promotion playoffs
5	Cáceres Patrimonio de la Humanidad	24	14	10	1721	1579	+142	38	Promotion playoffs
6	CEBA Guadalajara	24	13	11	1556	1578	−22	37	Promotion playoffs
7	Grupo Eulen Carrefour 'El Bulevar' de Ávila	24	13	11	1775	1771	+4	37	Promotion playoffs
8	Araberri BC	24	11	13	1694	1772	−78	35	Promotion playoffs
9	Zornotza ST	24	10	14	1747	1830	−83	34	Promotion playoffs
10	Azpeitia Azkoitia ISB	24	10	14	1811	1804	+7	34	
11	Marín Peixegalego	24	9	15	1685	1754	−69	33	
12	Conservas de Cambados	24	8	16	1623	1667	−44	32	
13	Askatuak	24	5	19	1479	1790	−311	29	Relegation to Liga EBA

(C): indicates Copa LEB Plata champion.

== Playoffs ==
Quarterfinals
2	CB Prat	70	56	74
9	Zornotza ST	61	59	55
5	Cáceres Patrimonio de la Humanidad	79	66	67
6	CEBA Guadalajara	67	71	59
3	Palma Air Europa	84	67	61
8	Araberri BC	88	66	47
4	Amics Castelló	71	83	83
7	Grupo Eulen Carrefour 'El Bulevar' de Ávila	73	78	68

Semifinals
2	CB Prat	78	57	107	68	84
5	Cáceres Patrimonio de la Humanidad	64	80	102	83	71
3	Palma Air Europa	104	89	81	X	X
4	Amics Castelló	71	80	61	X	X

Finals
2	CB Prat	81	82	67	X	X
3	Palma Air Europa	69	78	63	X	X

== Copa LEB Plata ==
At the half of the league, the two first teams in the table play the Copa LEB Plata at home of the winner of the first half season (13th round). If this team doesn't want to host the Copa LEB Plata, the second qualified can do it. If nobody wants to host it, the Federation will propose a neutral venue.

The Champion of this Cup will play the play-offs as first qualified if it finishes the league between the 2nd and the 5th qualified.

=== Teams qualified ===
Pos	Team	Pld	W	L	PF	PA	PD	Pts
1	Fundación Baloncesto Fuenlabrada	12	9	3	870	783	+87	21
2	CB Prat	12	9	3	968	892	+76	21

=== The game ===
2 February 2014
12:00

Report
Stats

Fundación Baloncesto Fuenlabrada	79–83	CB Prat
Scoring by quarter: 12–24, 15–23, 23–15, 29–21
Pts: Pérez Anagnostou 25; Rebs: Aramburu 7 Asts: R. Martínez, Sanz 7 PIR: Pérez Anagnostou 36		Pts: Sans 16; Rebs: Serrano 8 Asts: Ros 7 PIR: Ros 21
CB Prat, champion of the 2014 Copa LEB Plata

Polideportivo Fernando Martín, Fuenlabrada
Referees: Martínez Prada, Sánchez Benito, Murillo Khon

== Awards and trophies ==
=== MVP week by week ===
Day	Name	Team	PIR
1	(Spain) Albert Ausina	Amics Castelló	36
2	(United States) Jason Blair	Palma Air Europa	26
3	(Spain) Ignacio Urtasun	Askatuak	34
4	(United States) Javier Carter	Cáceres Patrimonio de la Humanidad	32
5	(Spain) Antonio Pantín	Palma Air Europa	40
6	(Spain) Alberto Rodríguez	Conservas de Cambados	31
7	(Lithuania) Gediminas Žylė	Azpeitia Azkoitia ISB	34
8	(Spain) Toni Vicens	Palma Air Europa	31
9	(United States) Kyle Rowley	Zornotza ST	30
10	(Spain) Antonio Pantín (2)	Palma Air Europa	27
11	(Nigeria) Ola Atoyebi	Amics Castelló	34
12	(Nigeria) Ola Atoyebi (2)	Amics Castelló	40
13	(Spain) Antonio Lorenzo (Spain) Alberto Rodríguez (2)	Zornotza ST; Conservas de Cambados	40
14	(Spain) Darío Suárez	Marín Peixegalego	26
15	(Spain) Joan Faner	Amics Castelló	34
16	(Spain) José Antonio Medina	Cáceres Patrimonio de la Humanidad	27
17	(United States) John di Bartolomeo	Palma Air Europa	39
18	(Spain) Albert Ausina (2)	Amics Castelló	34
19	(Spain) Joseba Aramburu	Marín Peixegalego	34
20	(Nigeria) Ola Atoyebi (3)	Amics Castelló	29
21	(Spain) Miguel Alberto Montañana	Cáceres Patrimonio de la Humanidad	31
22	(Spain) Añaterve Cruz	Palma Air Europa	28
23	(United States) Shalawn Miller	Askatuak	36
24	(United States) John di Bartolomeo (2)	Palma Air Europa	30
25	(Nigeria) Emmanuel Okoye (United States) Kyle Rowley (2)	Azpeitia Azkoitia ISB; Zornotza ST	28
26	(Spain) Albert Ausina (3)	Amics Castelló	23

== See also ==
- 2013–14 LEB Oro season
- 2013–14 Liga EBA season
