= Canarias Basketball Academy =

- Leagues: LEB Plata
- Founded: 2007; 18 years ago
- Arena: Pabellón de la Matanza
- Capacity: 5,200
- Location: Tenerife, Canary Islands, Spain
- Team colors: Black and orange
- President: Rob Orellana
- Head coach: Rob Orellana
- Website: cbacademy.org
Home	Away

Canarias Basketball Academy is a basketball institute based in Tenerife, Canary Islands, Spain.

Its senior team currently plays in the Spanish Basketball Federation with their U18 and U16 teams. The junior team usually participates in the Euroleague Basketball Nike International Junior Tournament. It also takes part in different tournaments in the USA such as the MaxPreps Tournament, the Hoop Group Under Armour and the Adidas Nations.

== History ==
Founded in 2007, the Canarias Basketball Academy was created with the aim of developing basketball players from all the world. Every year over 30 nationalities are represented in the academy, and it has grown from 15 players in 2007 to more than 100 in 2015.

Canarias Basketball Academy's founder and Director, Rob Orellana, saw that an academy as CBA in Europe could provide a key stepping stone for young players wanting to play college basketball in the United States. Since then Orellana has built a unique project in Europe that has sent more than 65 players have played in NCAA Division I like Matz Stockman (Louisville), Michal Cekovsky (Maryland), Thomas van der Mars (Portland), Boris Bojanovsky (Florida State), Patrik Auda (Seton Hall), or Vladimir Brodziansky (Texas Christian University)

In August 2014, the CBA achieved a vacant berth in LEB Plata league, the Spanish third division.

== Season by season ==
Season	Tier	Division	Pos.	W–L
2013–14	5	1ª División	1st (Note: Achieved a vacant berth in LEB Plata.)	17–2
2014–15	3	LEB Plata	11th	9–19
2015–16	5	1ª División	2nd	15–3

== Notable players ==
Note: Flags indicate national team eligibility at FIBA-sanctioned events. Players may hold other non-FIBA nationalities not displayed.

Criteria

To appear in this section a player must have either:

- Set a club record or won an individual award while at the club
- Played at least one official international match for their national team at any time
- Played at least one official NBA match at any time.

- (Slovakia) Vladimir Brodziansky
- (Netherlands) Charlon Kloof
- (Israel) Tom Maayan
- (United Kingdom) Menelik Watson
- Andy Van Vliet
