= 2012–13 LEB Plata season =

2012–2013 LEB Plata season
- League: LEB Plata
- Sport: Basketball
- Teams: 11

Regular Season
- Season champions: Unión Financiera Asturiana Oviedo Baloncesto
- Season MVP: (United States) Will Hanley
- Top scorer: (United States) Will Hanley

Play-offs
- Play-offs champions: Palma Air Europa
- Play-offs runners-up: Clínicas Rincón

Copa LEB Plata
- Champions: CEBA Guadalajara
- Runners-up: Unión Financiera Asturiana Oviedo Baloncesto
- Finals MVP: (Spain) Sergio Llorente

LEB Plata seasons
- ← 2011–12 2013–14 →

The 2012–13 LEB Plata season is the 13th season of the LEB Plata, second league of the Liga Española de Baloncesto and third division of Spanish basketball. It is also known as Adecco Plata in its sponsored identity.

== Competition format ==
Teams will play a regular season with a Round-robin tournament format. The regular season champion will promote directly to LEB Oro and the last qualified will be relegated to Liga EBA. Teams qualified from second to ninth will join the promotion playoffs. The winner will promote also to LEB Oro.

The two first qualified teams after the first half of the league will play the Copa LEB Plata.

Regular season will start in October 10.

=== Eligibility of players ===
All teams must have in their roster:

- A minimum of seven players who played in Spain during three season being between 15 and 20 years old.
- A maximum of two non-EU players. This players can be replaced by players from the EU or ACP countries.
- A maximum of two players from the EU or ACP countries.

Teams can not sign any player after February 28, 2012.

== Team information ==
New teams in the league:

- Clínicas Rincón (relegated after the 2011–12 LEB Oro)
- Cafés Aitona (promoted after the 2011–12 Liga EBA)
- Palma Air Europa (promoted after the 2011–12 Liga EBA)
- Amics Castelló (achieved a vacant berth in the league)
- Gran Canaria 2014 B (achieved a vacant berth in the league)
- CEBA Guadalajara (new creation team, achieved a vacant berth in the league)

Teams that left the league:

- River Andorra (promoted to LEB Oro as 2011–12 LEB Plata champion)
- Aguas de Sousas Ourense (promoted to LEB Oro as 2011–12 LEB Plata runner-up)
- CB Las Rozas (will play in Primera División)
- FC Barcelona Regal B (achieved one of the vacant berths in LEB Oro)
- Leyma Natura Básquet Coruña (achieved one of the vacant berths in LEB Oro)
- Plasencia Extremadura (will play in Liga EBA)
- Tenerife Baloncesto (will play in Primera División)
- Gandía Bàsquet (relegated to Liga EBA)

Team	City	Arena	Founded	Coach
Amics Castelló	Castellón de la Plana	Pabellón Ciutat de Castelló	1994	(Spain) Antonio Ten
Aurteneche Maquinaria Euskadi	Vitoria-Gasteiz	Polideportivo Mendizorroza	1994	(Spain) Iñaki Merino
Cafés Aitona	San Sebastián	Polideportivo Municipal J.A. Gasca	1975	(Spain) David Blanca
Azpeitia Azkoitia ISB	Azpeitia	Polideportivo Municipal	1975	(Spain) Iurgi Caminos
CB Prat Joventut	El Prat de Llobregat	Pavelló Joan Busquets	1951	(Spain) Carles Durán
CEBA Guadalajara	Guadalajara	Polideportivo San José	2011	(Spain) Ángel Cepeda
Clínicas Rincón	Málaga	Pabellón de Los Guindos	1992	(Spain) Francis Tomé
Grupo Eulen Carrefour "El Bulevar" de Ávila	Ávila	Multiusos Carlos Sastre	2001	(Spain) Armando Gómez
Gran Canaria 2014 B	Las Palmas de Gran Canaria	Centro Insular de Deportes		(Spain) Pablo Melo
Palma Air Europa	Palma de Mallorca	Pabellón Toni Servera	2006	(Spain) Maties Cerdà
Unión Financiera Asturiana Oviedo Baloncesto	Oviedo	Polideportivo de Pumarín	2004	(Spain) Guillermo Arenas

== Regular season ==
=== League table ===
#	Teams	P	W	L	PF	PA	PT	Qualification or relegation
1	Unión Financiera Asturiana Oviedo Baloncesto	20	15	5	1557	1381	35	Promotion to LEB Oro
2	CB Prat Joventut	20	13	7	1399	1350	33	Promotion playoffs
3	CEBA Guadalajara (C)	20	12	8	1490	1484	32	Promotion playoffs
4	Clínicas Rincón	20	12	8	1376	1348	32	Promotion playoffs
5	Palma Air Europa	20	11	9	1492	1463	31	Promotion playoffs
6	Aurteneche Maquinaria Euskadi	20	10	10	1507	1487	30	Promotion playoffs
7	Azpeitia Azkoitia ISB	20	10	10	1531	1478	30	Promotion playoffs
8	Amics Castelló	20	9	11	1519	1595	29	Promotion playoffs
9	Grupo Eulen Carrefour "El Bulevar" de Ávila	20	7	13	1403	1350	27	Promotion playoffs
10	Cafés Aitona	20	6	14	1263	1429	26	
11	Gran Canaria 2014 B	20	5	15	1290	1462	25	Relegation to Liga EBA

(C) = Copa LEB Plata champion

=== Results ===
	AMICS	AURT	ISB	AIT	PRAT	CEBA	CLI	ÁVILA	GCA	PALM	OVIE
Amics Castelló		97–93	71–70	72–59	64–80	93–94	72–77	57–80	85–70	84–85	85–80
Aurteneche Maquinaria Euskadi	85–59		92–87	67–50	72–84	89–68	83–75	76–75	90–70	77–87	70–74
Azpeitia Azkoitia ISB	102–83	61–64		56–66	79–71	80–62	77–81	84–73	66–71	97–86	84–80
Cafés Aitona	90–73	73–64	74–63		47–59	71–78	56–88	55–80	60–45	70–76	51–57
CB Prat Joventut	67–59	73–66	74–67	52–59		68–75	70–66	69–61	87–79	64–81	63–69
CEBA Guadalajara	69–71	85–71	74–86	71–59	69–75		83–62	80–69	72–65	75–66	91–98
Clínicas Rincón	82–67	78–68	57–77	57–62	62–59	66–67		71–60	68–56	66–61	54–67
Grupo Eulen Carrefour "El Bulevar" de Ávila	63–65	65–73	72–83	112–71	66–75	63–47	70–75		73–44	72–54	79–66
Gran Canaria 2014 B	76–77	63–70	75–72	76–71	56–68	65–72	50–57	62–45		75–74	59–89
Palma Air Europa	72–86	86–79	75–71	73–56	74–77	86–72	69–75	68–64	74–52		71–68
Unión Financiera Asturiana Oviedo Baloncesto	81–79	77–58	79–57	88–55	79–64	81–86	74–59	75–61	92–81	83–74	

== Promotion playoffs ==
Teams 2nd to 9th qualify for the promotion playoffs to LEB Oro. The quarterfinals will be played in a two-legged tie, where the seeded team will play the second game at home. Semifinals and final winners, will be decided in a best-of-five series, played with 2-2-1 format.

Quarterfinals; April 6, 13
C	CEBA Guadalajara	69	59	118
9	Grupo Eulen Carrefour "El Bulevar" de Ávila	70	56	126
5	Palma Air Europa	64	86	150
6	Aurteneche Maquinaria Euskadi	65	72	137
2	CB Prat Joventut	54	86	140
8	Amics Castelló	79	63	142
4	Clínicas Rincón	73	59	132
7	Azpeitia Azkoitia ISB	78	52	130

Semifinals; April 19, 21, 24, 26, 28
C	CEBA Guadalajara	73	80	88	X	X
5	Palma Air Europa	79	84	94	X	X
8	Amics Castelló	60	77	66	69	X
4	Clínicas Rincón	80	69	76	79	X

Finals; May 3, 5, 8, 10, 12
5	Palma Air Europa	74	51	70	87	72
4	Clínicas Rincón	59	61	74	83	65

== Copa LEB Plata ==
At the half of the league, the two first teams in the table play the Copa LEB Plata at home of the winner of the first half season (11th round). If this team doesn't want to host the Copa LEB Plata, the second qualified can do it. If nobody wants to host it, the Federation will propose a neutral venue.

The Champion of this Cup will play the play-offs as first qualified if it finishes the league between the 2nd and the 5th qualified. The Copa LEB Plata will be played on February 2, 2012.

=== Teams qualified ===
#	Teams	P	W	L	PF	PA	PT
1	CEBA Guadalajara	10	8	2	746	718	18
2	Unión Financiera Asturiana Oviedo Baloncesto	10	7	3	759	685	17

=== The game ===
3 February 2013
12:00

Report
Stats

CEBA Guadalajara	78–71	Unión Financiera Asturiana Oviedo B.
Scoring by quarter: 20–14, 16–14, 21–26, 20–17
Pts: Llorente 22; Rebs: Balmón 11; Asts: Llorente 7 PIR: Llorente 38		Pts: Pérez 24; Rebs: Hanley 8 Asts: Pérez 4 PIR: Pérez 19
CEBA Guadalajara, champion of the Copa LEB Plata

Polideportivo San José, Guadalajara
Attendance: 900
Referees: Palenzuela Pastrana, Mas Cagide, Aliaga Solé

== Awards ==
=== MVP Week by Week ===
==== Regular season ====
Date	Player	Team	PIR
1	(United States) Mick Hedgepeth	Aurteneche Maquinaria Euskadi	34
2	(Spain) Alberto Ausina	Amics Castelló	25
3	(Spain) Alberto Díaz	Clínicas Rincón	29
4	(Spain) Antonio Pantín	Azpeitia Azkoitia ISB	35
5	(Senegal) Moussa Diagné	Grupo Eulen Carrefour "El Bulevar" de Ávila	27
6	(United States) Will Hanley	Unión Financiera Asturiana Oviedo Baloncesto	36
7	(United States) Will Hanley (2)	Unión Financiera Asturiana Oviedo Baloncesto (2)	30
7	(Spain) David Ortega	Amics Castelló (2)	30
8	(Spain) Gerbert Martí	CB Prat Joventut	31
9	(Spain) José María Balmón	CEBA Guadalajara	38
10	(Spain) Carlos Martínez	Cafés Aitona	29
10	(Spain) Víctor Hidalgo	Amics Castelló (3)	29
11	(United States) Will Hanley (3)	Unión Financiera Asturiana Oviedo Baloncesto (3)	29
12	(Spain) Víctor Hidalgo (2)	Amics Castelló (4)	44
13	(United States) Will Hanley (4)	Unión Financiera Asturiana Oviedo Baloncesto (4)	31
14	(United States) Riley Luettgerodt	Grupo Eulen Carrefour "El Bulevar" de Ávila (2)	31
15	(Spain) Toni Vicens	Grupo Eulen Carrefour "El Bulevar" de Ávila (3)	35
16	(United States) Lance Kearse	Azpeitia Azkoitia ISB (2)	34
17	(United States) Will Hanley (5)	Unión Financiera Asturiana Oviedo Baloncesto (5)	32
18	(Spain) Víctor Arteaga	CEBA Guadalajara (2)	37
18	(Spain) Víctor Hidalgo (3)	Amics Castelló (5)	37
19	(Spain) Guillem Vives	CB Prat Joventut (2)	34
20	(Cape Verde) Walter Tavares	Gran Canaria 2014 B	39
21	(Haiti) Robert Joseph	Palma Air Europa	29
22	(Spain) Antonio Pantín (2)	Azpeitia Azkoitia ISB (3)	33

==== Playoffs ====
Date	Player	Team	PIR
QF1	(Spain) Álex Ros	CB Prat Joventut (3)	26
QF2	(Spain) Sergio Llorente (2)	CEBA Guadalajara (3)	31
SF1	(Spain) Sergio Llorente (3)	CEBA Guadalajara (4)	28
SF2	(Spain) Víctor Hidalgo (4)	Amics Castelló (6)	31
SF3	(Spain) Sergio Llorente (4)	CEBA Guadalajara (5)	28
SF4	(Senegal) Maodo Nguirane	Clínicas Rincón (2)	24
F1	(Haiti) Robert Joseph (2)	Palma Air Europa (2)	24
F2	(Spain) Pepe Pozas	Clínicas Rincón (3)	22
