= Javier Muñoz (basketball) =

Spanish basketball coach

Personal information
- Born: 17 May 1974 (age 52) Lugo, Spain
- Position: Head coach
- Coaching career: 1998–present

Career history

Coaching
- 1998–2002: Estudiantes de Lugo
- 2002–2004: CB Breogán (assistant)
- 2004–2005: Estudiantes de Lugo
- 2005–2006: Club Baloncesto Calpe (assistant)
- 2006–2007: CB Breogán (assistant)
- 2007–2008: Club Melilla Baloncesto (assistant)
- 2008–2009: CEBA Guadalajara
- 2009–2010: Club Ourense Baloncesto
- 2010–2014: Durán Maquinaria Ensino
- 2014–2017: Club Melilla Baloncesto (assistant)
- 2017–2018: Fuerza Regia de Monterrey (assistant)
- 2018–2019: Santos del Potosí
- 2019–2024: CB Breogán (assistant)
- 2024–2025: Abejas de León

Javier López Muñoz (born 17 May 1974) is a Spanish basketball coach. He is the head coach of the Abejas de León.

== Coaching career ==
Muñoz started his coaching career in Spain with Estudiantes de Lugo. In the 2017–20 season, he was the assistant coach for Fuerza Regia de Monterrey in Mexico. In 2018 he joined Santos del Potosí. In 2019 he joined the staff of CB Breogán. On 2024, Muñoz signed with the Abejas de León.
