= AB Castelló =

TAU Castelló
- Leagues: LEB Oro
- Founded: 1994; 32 years ago
- Arena: Pabellón Ciutat de Castelló
- Capacity: 3,000
- Location: Castellón de la Plana, Spain
- President: Luis García Sainz
- Head coach: Antonio Ten
- Championships: 1 Copa LEB Plata
- Website: amicscastello.com
Home	Away

Amics del Bàsquet Castelló, also known as TAU Castelló for sponsorship reasons, is a basketball team based in Castellón de la Plana, Spain. It was founded in 1994 and currently plays in LEB Oro.

Real Madrid's coach Pablo Laso started his coach career in this team, in the 2003–2004 LEB 2 season.

== History ==
Founded in 1994, Amics Castelló played for the first time the Liga EBA in the 1999–2000 season, achieving in 2002 a vacant berth to play the LEB 2 league, Spanish third division. After four seasons always in the low part of the standings, Amics Castelló was relegated to the Liga EBA, where it played during the six next seasons, only qualifying for the promotion playoffs in the last one.

However, the club achieved again a vacant place in LEB Plata, playing there until the 2014–15 season, when the club won the Copa LEB Plata by defeating CEBA Guadalajara and promoted to LEB Oro, also defeating the team from Castile-La Mancha.

== Players ==
=== Current roster ===
Note: Flags indicate national team eligibility at FIBA-sanctioned events. Players may hold other non-FIBA nationalities not displayed.

TAU Castelló roster
Players
Coaches

Pos.	No.	Nat.	Name	Ht.	Age
F	13	(Spain)	Hernández, Pablo	2.01 m (6 ft 7 in)	29 – 17 February 1997
G	7	(Spain)	Alvarado, Oscar	1.84 m (6 ft 0 in)	35 – 6 June 1991
F	44	(Sweden)	Höök, David	1.98 m (6 ft 6 in)	27 – 7 April 1999
G	6	(Spain)	Durán, Eduardo	1.95 m (6 ft 5 in)	35 – 1 May 1991
C	25	(Netherlands)	Edwards, Kai	2.06 m (6 ft 9 in)	29 – 10 August 1997
G	8	(Spain)	Faner, Joan	1.76 m (5 ft 9 in)	35 – 17 November 1990
F	9	(Spain)	Bilbao, Jorge	2.02 m (6 ft 8 in)	31 – 27 June 1995
C	5	(Latvia)	Rotizis, Davis	2.15 m (7 ft 1 in)	36 – 16 March 1990
G	15	(Spain)	Sabaté, Joel	1.91 m (6 ft 3 in)	27 – 4 February 1999
F	42	(United States)	Stutz, Eric	2.05 m (6 ft 9 in)	34 – 9 September 1992
F		(Spain)	Campos, Jaime	1.97 m (6 ft 6 in)	28 – 18 September 1998

Head coach

- (Spain) Toni Ten

Legend

- (C) Team captain
- Injured

- Roster
Updated: December 27, 2021

=== Depth chart ===
Pos.	Starting 5	Bench 1	Bench 2
C	Davis Rotizis	Kai Edwards
PF	Eric Stutz	Pablo Hernandez	Jorge Bilbao
SF	David Hook	Calvin Hermanson	Jaime Campos
SG	Eduardo Durán	Joel Sabaté
PG	Óscar Alvarado	Joan Faner

Colours: Blue = homegrown player; Red = non-FIBA Europe player

== Season by season ==
Season	Tier	Division	Pos.	W–L	Cup competitions	
1999–00	3	Liga EBA	7th	13–13		
2000–01	4	Liga EBA	4th	13–13		
2001–02	4	Liga EBA	6th (Note: Achieved a vacant berth in LEB 2.)	18–12		
2002–03	3	LEB 2	14th	13–21		
2003–04	3	LEB 2	12th	10–16		
2004–05	3	LEB 2	12th	12–18		
2005–06	3	LEB 2	15th	12–22		
2006–07	4	Liga EBA	7th	13–13		
2007–08	5	Liga EBA	12th	12–16		
2008–09	5	Liga EBA	5th	20–10		
2009–10	4	Liga EBA	6th	18–1–11		
2010–11	4	Liga EBA	9th	11–15		
2011–12	4	Liga EBA	2nd (Note: Achieved a vacant berth in LEB Plata.)	18–6		
2012–13	3	LEB Plata	5th	11–15		
2013–14	3	LEB Plata	4th	16–14		
2014–15	3	LEB Plata	2nd	30–10	Copa LEB Plata	C
2015–16	2	LEB Oro	11th	13–17		
2016–17	2	LEB Oro	15th	12–22		
2017–18	2	LEB Oro	7th	20–18		
2018–19	2	LEB Oro	13th	13–21		
2019–20	2	LEB Oro	11th (Note: Season curtailed due to the COVID-19 pandemic.)	10–14		
2020–21	2	LEB Oro	5th	21–10		
2021–22	2	LEB Oro	10th	17–17		
2022–23	2	LEB Oro	10th	17–17		
2023–24	2	LEB Oro	15th	11–23		
2024–25	2	Primera FEB	17th	10–24	Spain Cup	QF
2025–26	3	Segunda FEB	4th	24–8	Spain Cup	R16
2026–27	3	Segunda FEB			Spain Cup	GS

== Trophies and awards ==
=== Trophies ===
- Copa LEB Plata: (1)
  - 2015

=== Individual awards ===
LEB Plata MVP

- Ola Atoyebi – 2014
- Nick Washburn – 2015

Copa LEB Plata MVP

- Nick Washburn – 2015
