= Óbila CB =

- Leagues: LEB Plata
- Founded: 2001
- Arena: Multiusos Carlos Sastre
- Location: Ávila, Castile and León
- Team colors: Green and yellow
- President: Rodrigo Martín
- Head coach: Armando Gómez
- Website: obila.com
Home	Away

Óbila Club de Basket, also known as Ávila Auténtica Carrefour "El Bulevar", is a Spanish professional basketball team based in Ávila, Castilla y León and plays in the Multiusos Carlos Sastre, in LEB Plata. Óbila is the only basketball team in the city of Ávila.

From 2011 to 2013, Óbila collaborated with Baloncesto Fuenlabrada as its farm team.

== History ==
Óbila Club de Basket was born in Ávila in 2001. It was founded by a group of amateur players willing to enjoy basket in this city. In 2003 the club started playing at Liga EBA for the first time and finished in the 12th position.

At the 2005–06 season the team finished in the third position and qualified for the promotion playoffs to the LEB 2 League but it was eliminated, as well as in the 2006–07 season, when it finished the regular season in the second position.

In 2007 the Spanish Basketball Federation decided to create a third LEB with 18 teams named LEB Bronce and Óbila CB got a spot in this new division. In its first season LEB Bronce the club avoided the relegation to Liga EBA. After finishing the regular season as runner-up in their second season, the club promoted to LEB Plata by defeating the CB Tíjola in the playoffs. Dreike Bouldin won the MVP award and Paul Williams was named the third best player of the season.

Two years after promoting to LEB Plata, the club played its first promotion playoffs to LEB Oro, reaching the quarterfinals in 2010–11 and 2011–12.

Due to economic issues, in July 2012, the club decided not to take part in the 2012–13 LEB Plata season. One week after this decision the club reached a sponsorship agreement with Grupo Eulen solving its economic problems and signed up for the 2012–13 LEB Plata season.

In the 2015–16 season, Óbila ended as runner-up of the Copa LEB Plata and was defeated by Sáenz Horeca Araberri in the finals of the promotion playoffs to LEB Oro. Three years later, in 2019, the club was relegated to Liga EBA after ten consecutive seasons in the third tier.

== Current squad ==
Note: Flags indicate national team eligibility at FIBA-sanctioned events. Players may hold other non-FIBA nationalities not displayed.

Óbila CB roster
Players
Coaches

Pos.	No.	Nat.	Name		Age
SG	31	(Spain)	Castro, Juan	1.98 m (6 ft 6 in)	28 – 21 June 1998
F	11	(France)	Diagne, Ibrahima	2.03 m (6 ft 8 in)	30 – 11 September 1995
PG	8	(Spain)	Lobo, Jaume	1.80 m (5 ft 11 in)	29 – 31 July 1997
C	22	(Spain)	Perez, Ander	2.18 m (7 ft 2 in)	30 – 1 February 1996
PG	19	(Serbia)	Radoslajević, Stefan		33 – 21 July 1993
SG	10	(Spain)	Sanchez, Javier	1.88 m (6 ft 2 in)
F	7	(United States)	Smith, Martin	1.96 m (6 ft 5 in)	33 – 14 May 1993
G/F	9	(Spain)	Tebar, Alvaro	1.77 m (5 ft 10 in)	27 – 1 May 1999

Head coach

(Spain) Jose Antonio Sanchez

Assistant coach(es)

(Spain) Mauricio Velayos

Legend

- (C) Team captain
- Injured

- Roster
Updated: 1 September 2019

== Season by season ==
Season	Tier	Division	Pos.	W–L	Cup competitions	
2003–04	4	Liga EBA	12th	11–19		
2004–05	4	Liga EBA	9th	14–16		
2005–06	4	Liga EBA	3rd	21–11		
2006–07	4	Liga EBA	2nd (Note: The club was invited to join the newly created LEB Bronce.)	21–7		
2007–08	4	LEB Bronce	12th	14–18		
2008–09	4	LEB Bronce	2nd	23–13		
2009–10	3	LEB Plata	18th	13–15		
2010–11	3	LEB Plata	9th	13–19		
2011–12	3	LEB Plata	8th	12–14		
2012–13	3	LEB Plata	9th	8–14		
2013–14	3	LEB Plata	7th	14–13		
2014–15	3	LEB Plata	9th	15–15		
2015–16	3	LEB Plata	3rd	20–16	Copa LEB Plata	RU
2016–17	3	LEB Plata	8th	18–16		
2017–18	3	LEB Plata	4th	21–15		
2018–19	3	LEB Plata	21st	15–19		
2019–20	4	Liga EBA	2nd	16–4		

== Notable players ==
To appear in this section a player must have either:

- Set a club record or won an individual award as a professional player.
- Played at least one official international match for his senior national team at any time.

- (Madagascar) Charles Ramsdell
- (Uganda) Robinson Odoch
- (Uganda) Brandon Sebirumbi
