= 2005–06 LEB 2 season =

- League: LEB 2
- Sport: Basketball
- Number of games: 306 (regular season)
- Number of teams: 18
- Season champions: Autocid Ford Burgos
- Season MVP: (United States) Brett Beeson

LEB 2 seasons
- ← 2004–05 2006–07 →

The 2005–06 LEB 2 season was the 6th season of the LEB Plata, second league of the Liga Española de Baloncesto and third division in Spain. It is also named Adecco Plata for sponsorship reasons.

== Competition format ==
16 teams play the regular season. This is a round robin, where each team will play twice against every rival. After the regular season, the eight first qualified teams played a playoff, were the two finalists promoted to LEB.

The last qualified team was relegated to Liga EBA, with the loser of the relegation playoffs, played by the 14th and the 15th qualified teams.

If two or more teams have got the same number of winning games, the criteria of tie-breaking are these:

1. Head-to-head winning games.
2. Head-to-head points difference.
3. Total points difference.

== Regular season ==
=== League table ===
#	Teams	GP	W	L	PF	PA	PT	Qualification or relegation
1	Autocid Ford Burgos	30	22	8	2468	2263	52	Promotion playoffs
2	Aguas de Valencia Gandía	30	21	9	2567	2397	51	Promotion playoffs
3	WTC Cornellà	30	20	10	2432	2242	50	Promotion playoffs
4	Club Ourense Baloncesto	30	19	11	2343	2233	49	Promotion playoffs
5	CAI Huesca La Magia	30	19	11	2424	2388	49	Promotion playoffs
6	Imaje Sabadell Gapsa	30	18	12	2385	2357	48	Promotion playoffs
7	Valls Félix Hotel	30	16	14	2111	2118	46	Promotion playoffs
8	Akasvayu Vic	30	15	15	2375	2347	45	Promotion playoffs
9	Ulla Oil Noyastar Rosalía	30	14	16	2318	2350	44	
10	Hormigones Saldaña	30	13	17	2202	2294	43	
11	CajaRioja	30	12	18	2200	2294	43	
12	Clínicas Rincón Axarquía	30	12	18	2158	2255	42	
13	Sedesa Llíria	30	11	19	2394	2468	41	
14	Pamesa Cerámica Castellón	30	11	19	2215	2381	41	Relegation playoffs
15	Ciudad de La Laguna Canarias	30	10	20	2274	2336	40	Relegation playoffs
16	Celso Míguez Procolor	30	7	23	2237	2493	37	Relegation to Liga EBA

== Promotion playoffs ==
Quarter Finals
1	Autocid Ford Burgos	3
8	Akasvayu Vic	0
4	Ourense Baloncesto	3
5	CAI Huesca La Magia	2
2	Aguas de Valencia	3
7	Valls Félix Hotel	1
3	WTC Cornellà	3
6	Imaje Sabadell Gapsa	1

SemiFinals
1	Autocid Ford Burgos	3
4	Ourense Baloncesto	0
2	Aguas de Valencia	3
3	WTC Cornellà	0

Finals
1	CB Atapuerca	89
2	Aguas de Valencia	82

== Relegation playoffs ==
Finals
14	Pamesa Castellón	1
15	Ciudad de La Laguna	3

== MVP of the regular season ==
- (United States) Brett Beeson (Imaje Sabadell Gapsa)
