= Iraurgi SB =

- Leagues: LEB Oro (men); Liga Femenina 2 (women)
- Founded: 1975
- Arena: Polideportivo Municipal
- Capacity: 812
- Location: Azpeitia, Spain
- Team colors: Red and white
- President: (Spain) Maier Lizaso
- Head coach: (Spain) Iker Bueno
- Website: isb.eus
Home	Away

Iraurgi Saski Baloia, also known as Sammic Hostelería for sponsorship reasons, is a professional basketball team based in Azpeitia, Basque Country, Spain. Founded in 1975, the men's team currently plays in LEB Oro and the women's team in the Liga Femenina 2.

== History ==
Club logo until 2019.

Iraurgi was founded in 1975 and takes its name from the Iraurgi valley, located between Azpeitia and Azkoitia. In its first seasons, the club played the provincial competitions of Gipuzkoa.

In 2005, the men's club made its debut in national competition by playing the Liga EBA. The club grew up in the league and in 2009 qualified for the first time to the promotion playoffs to LEB Plata, achieving promotion in their second attempt, in 2010.

The club finished in the last position after its debut season, but remained in the league after the existence of vacant spots. Six years later, on 15 April 2017, the club clinched the title of the 2016–17 LEB Plata and achieved promotion to LEB Oro, second division.

Previously in 2015, the women's team clinched promotion to Liga Femenina 2 but was not admitted in the league by the Spanish Basketball Federation. However, Iraurgi finally registered in the first division, where in their only season they only won two matches out of 26, being relegated to Liga Femenina 2.

== Current roster ==
Note: Flags indicate national team eligibility at FIBA-sanctioned events. Players may hold other non-FIBA nationalities not displayed.

Sammic Hostelería roster
Players
Coaches

Pos.	No.	Nat.	Name	Ht.	Age
F	20	(United States)	Bukingham, Kevin	1.98 m (6 ft 6 in)	28 – 14 November 1997
G		(France)	Cissoko, Sidy	1.98 m (6 ft 6 in)	21 – 2 April 2004
C	21	(Netherlands)	Dijkstra, Menno	2.13 m (7 ft 0 in)	28 – 11 January 1997
G		(Czech Republic)	Hanzlik, Ondrej	2.02 m (6 ft 8 in)	23 – 2 March 2002
F	35	(Spain)	Seoane, Rodrigo	2.02 m (6 ft 8 in)	26 – 16 August 1999
G/F	27	(Spain)	Guridi, Ibon	1.93 m (6 ft 4 in)	33 – 3 March 1992
G	5	(Spain)	Hevia, Benat	1.83 m (6 ft 0 in)	30 – 15 April 1995
F	10	(Spain)	Ansorregui, Manex	1.95 m (6 ft 5 in)	23 – 11 April 2002
F/C	44	(Senegal)	Thiam, Abdou	2.05 m (6 ft 9 in)	27 – 13 August 1998
F	8	(Spain)	Royo, Inigo	2.00 m (6 ft 7 in)	25 – 3 May 2000

Head coach

- (Spain) Lolo Encinas

Assistant coach(es)

- (Spain) Goar Arteche
- (Spain) Xabier Aramburu

Legend

- (C) Team captain
- Injured

- Roster

== Season by season ==
=== Men's team ===
Season	Tier	Division	Pos.	W–L	Cup competitions	
2005–06	4	Liga EBA	10th	14–16		
2006–07	4	Liga EBA	9th	13–13		
2007–08	5	Liga EBA	6th	18–12		
2008–09	5	Liga EBA	1st	23–8		
2009–10	4	Liga EBA	2nd	23–1–8		
2010–11	3	LEB Plata	15th (Note: Remained in LEB Plata after achieving one of the vacant berths in the league.)	8–20		
2011–12	3	LEB Plata	9th	13–14		
2012–13	3	LEB Plata	8th	11–11		
2013–14	3	LEB Plata	10th	10–14		
2014–15	3	LEB Plata	12th	9–19		
2015–16	3	LEB Plata	6th	20–9		
2016–17	3	LEB Plata	1st	23–7		
2017–18	2	LEB Oro	17th	12–22		
2018–19	3	LEB Plata	10th	19–15		
2019–20	3	LEB Plata	11th (Note: Season curtailed due to the COVID-19 pandemic.)	14–11	Copa LEB Plata	C

=== Women's team ===
Season	Tier	Division	Pos.
2010–11	4	2ª División	2nd
2011–12	3	1ª División	10th
2012–13	3	1ª División	11th
2013–14	3	1ª División	4th
2014–15	3	1ª División	2nd (Note: After not being admitted in Liga Femenina 2, the club registered to play the Liga Femenina.)
2015–16	1	Liga Femenina	14th
2016–17	2	Liga Femenina 2	11th
2017–18	2	Liga Femenina 2	8th
2018–19	2	Liga Femenina 2	3rd

== Trophies and awards ==
=== Men's team ===
- LEB Plata: (1)
  - 2016–17
- Copa LEB Plata: (1)
  - 2019–20
- Euskal Kopa: (1)
  - 2014

== Notable players ==
- Set a club record or won an individual award as a professional player.
- Played at least one official international match for his senior national team at any time.

- (Czech Republic) Ondřej Hanzlík
- (Chile) Manny Suárez
- (Sweden) Barra Njie
