= Xuventude Baloncesto =

- Nickname: Xuven
- Leagues: LEB Plata
- Founded: 1978
- Arena: O Pombal
- Location: Cambados, Galicia, Spain
- Team colors: Yellow and black
- Head coach: Yago Casal
- Championships: 1 Liga EBA Championship
- Website: www.xuven.com
Home	Away

Club Xuventude Baloncesto is a basketball team based in Cambados, Galicia (Spain). The team currently plays in league LEB Plata.

== History ==
Xuventude Cambados was founded by a group of friends in 1976.

In 1999, Xuven promoted to Liga EBA, where it played four seasons before being relegated to Primera División. In 2009, the club came back to Liga EBA and in 2011 it qualified for the promotion playoffs to LEB Plata where, despite completing a 28–2 record in the regular season, it failed in the playoffs after losing in the finals to CE Sant Nicolau.

In its second attempt, Xuven clinched the All-Liga EBA title after ending the whole season with a 21–2 record, thus promoting to LEB Plata. The club remained five seasons in the league before being relegated again to Liga EBA. However, Xuven was demoted to the sixth division after failing to fulfill the requirements to play in Liga EBA.

== Sponsorship naming ==
- Conservas Olímpico Cambados: 1986–1988
- Albariño Pazo Bayón: 1988–1989
- Condes de Albarei: 1991–1993
- Centrotiendas Cambados: 1999–2000
- Establecimientos Otero: 2000–2013
- Conservas de Cambados: 2013–2014
- Cambados Cidade Europea do Viño 2017: 2016–2017

== Season by season ==
Season	Tier	Division	Pos.	W–L
1991–92	3	2ª División	11th	10–18
1992–93	3	2ª División	11th	12–16
1993–94	3	2ª División	11th	16–12
1994–95	3	2ª División	10th	12–16
1995–96	3	2ª División	14th	10–18
1996–97	4	2ª División	8th	14–14
1997–98	4	2ª División	6th	10–18
1998–99	4	2ª División	3rd	20–11
1999–00	4	1ª División	2nd	26–5
2000–01	4	Liga EBA	13th	12–18
2001–02	4	Liga EBA	12th	14–20
2002–03	4	Liga EBA	9th	12–18
2003–04	4	Liga EBA	14th	8–22
2004–05	5	1ª División		18–10
2005–06	5	1ª División	11th	16–12
2006–07	5	1ª División	5th	17–11
2007–08	6	1ª División	2nd	26–7
2008–09	6	1ª División	6th (Note: Achieved a vacant berth in LEB Plata.)	20–10
2009–10	4	Liga EBA	12th	11–15
2010–11	4	Liga EBA	8th	11–1–10
2011–12	4	Liga EBA	1st	22–1–3
2012–13	4	Liga EBA	1st	21–2
2013–14	3	LEB Plata	12th	8–16
2014–15	3	LEB Plata	7th	16–14
2015–16	3	LEB Plata	11th	10–16
2016–17	3	LEB Plata	6th	22–12
2017–18	3	LEB Plata	13th (Note: Resigned to play in Liga EBA.)	11–19
2018–19	5	1ª División	15th	5–15

== Trophies and awards ==
=== Trophies ===
- Liga EBA: (1)
  - 2012–13
