= Eric Stutz =

American basketball player

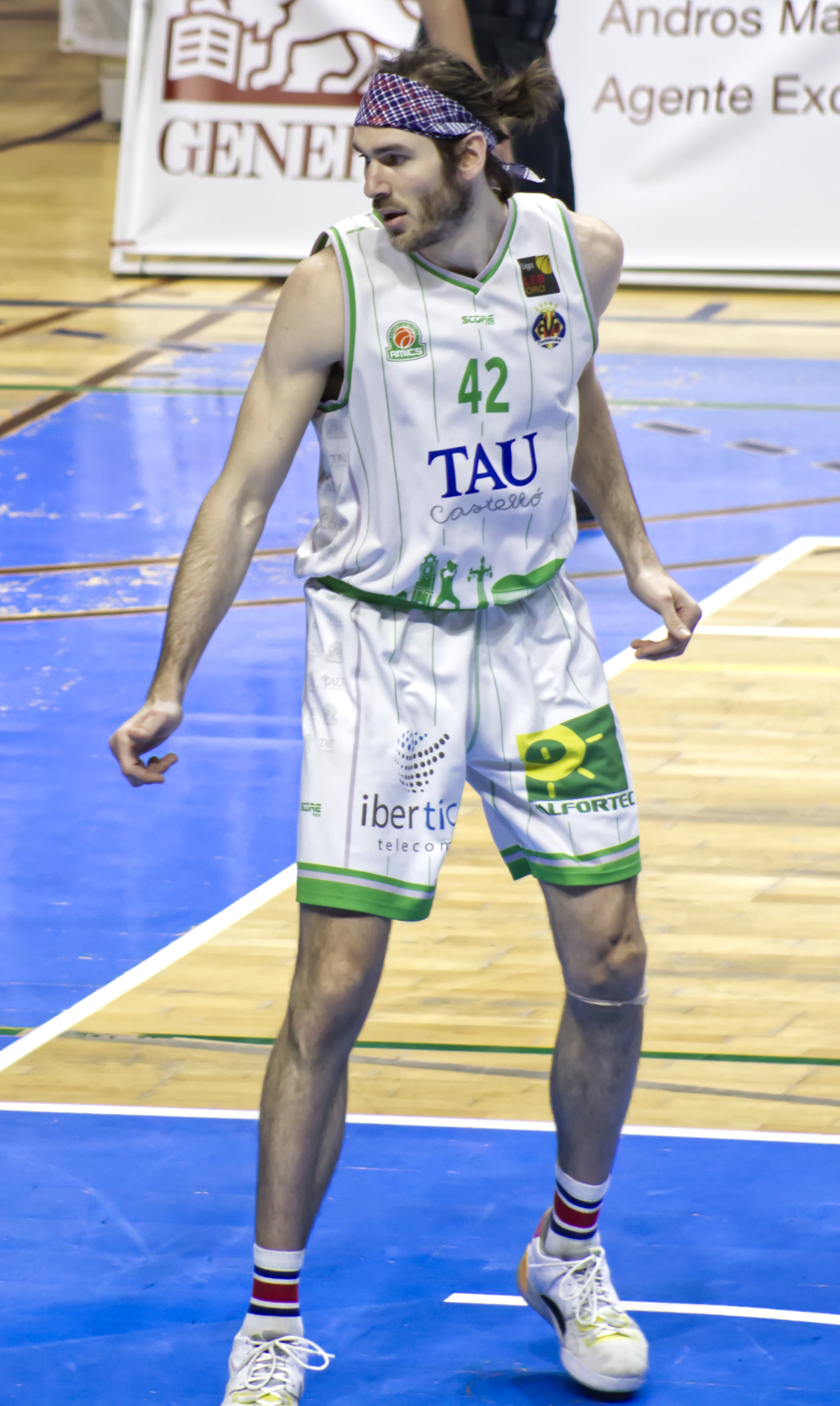

TAU Castelló
- Position: Power forward
- League: LEB Oro

Personal information
- Born: 9 September 1992 (age 34) Newburgh, Indiana
- Listed height: 2.05 m (6 ft 9 in)
- Listed weight: 225 lb (102 kg)

Career information
- High school: Castle (Newburgh, Indiana)
- College: Eastern Kentucky (2011–2015)
- NBA draft: 2015: undrafted
- Playing career: 2015–present

Career history
- 2015: Leiden
- 2015–2016: Inter Bratislava
- 2016–2017: Trepça
- 2017–2018: Bashkimi
- 2018–2020: Força Lleida
- 2020–2021: Ramat HaSharon
- 2021–present: Castelló

Career highlights
- First-team NABC All-District (2015); First-team All-OVC (2015); Kosovar League champion (2018)

Frederic George Stutz (born 9 September 1992), is an American professional basketball player for AB Castelló of the LEB Oro.

== High school career ==
Stutz attended John H. Castle High School in Newburgh, Indiana where he won Southern Indiana Athletic Conference championships. Was named the 2011 Evansville Courier & Press All-Metro Player of the Year, averaging 21.6 points and 10.6 rebounds per game.

== College career ==
Played in and started all 32 games as a freshman, averaging 8.0 points and 4.5 rebounds per game. As a sophomore he played in and started all 35 games, averaging 8.1 points and a team-best 4.6 rebounds per game. Played in all 34 games and averaged 8.6 points along with 4.6 rebounds per game as a junior. Played four games during Eastern Kentucky's summer tour in Australia. As a senior he played 32 games, averaging career-best 15.6 points and 5.7 rebounds. Named First-team NABC All-District and First-team All-OVC.

== Professional career ==
After playing at Eastern Kentucky, Stutz started his pro career in 2015 with the Dutch club Zorg en Zekerheid Leiden. On 6 December 2015 he left the team after 6 games of the Dutch Basketball League and 3 of the FIBA Europe Cup. Three days after he joined the Slovak club Inter Bratislava, where he played 3 games.

In July 2016 he joined the Kosovar club KB Trepça, playing Kosovo Basketball Superleague and Balkan International Basketball League. Next season played for the 2018 kosovar champions Bashkimi Prizren.

On 21 September 2018, signed for LEB Oro side Força Lleida.
