= Robert Joseph (basketball) =

Haitian basketball player

No. 8 – CB Bahía San Agustín
- Position: Center
- League: LEB Plata

Personal information
- Born: May 5, 1978 (age 48) Port-au-Prince, Haiti
- Listed height: 6 ft 8 in (2.03 m)
- Listed weight: 220 lb (100 kg)

Career information
- College: Union University
- NBA draft: 2002: undrafted

Robert Joseph (born May 5, 1978) is a former Haitian professional basketball player who played in the Spanish basketball league system for twelve seasons.

== Early years ==
Joseph was born in Port-au-Prince, Haiti. He emigrated to the United States and played college basketball at Union University in Tennessee, a school which has become a haven for many top Haitian talent over the years. Joseph broke David Robinson's single season college shot block record and was named NAIA Player of the Year.

== Professional ==
Joseph played in the Liga ACB, which is the first league in Spain. He is considered to be one of the best professional basketball leagues in the world behind the NBA.
