= 2006–07 LEB 2 season =

- League: LEB 2
- Sport: Basketball
- Number of games: 306 (regular season)
- Number of teams: 18
- Season champions: Beirasar Rosalía
- Season MVP: (United States) Jason Blair

LEB 2 seasons
- ← 2005–06 2007–08 →

The 2006–07 LEB 2 season was the 7th season of the LEB 2, second league of the Liga Española de Baloncesto and third division in Spain. It is also named Adecco Plata for sponsorship reasons.

== Competition format ==
18 teams play the regular season. This is a round robin, where each team will play twice against every rival. After the regular season, the eight first qualified teams played a playoff, were the two finalists promoted to LEB Oro.

The last qualified team was relegated to the new LEB Bronce, with the loser of the relegation playoffs, played by the 16th and the 17th qualified teams.

If two or more teams have got the same number of winning games, the criteria of tie-breaking are these:

1. Head-to-head winning games.
2. Head-to-head points difference.
3. Total points difference.

== Regular season ==
=== League table ===
#	Teams	GP	W	L	PF	PA	PT	Qualification or relegation
1	Ciudad de La Laguna Canarias	34	29	5	2826	2569	63	Promotion playoffs
2	Beirasar Rosalía	34	22	12	2644	2507	56	Promotion playoffs
3	Club Ourense Baloncesto	34	22	12	2469	2341	56	Promotion playoffs
4	Akasvayu Vic	34	22	12	2463	2367	56	Promotion playoffs
5	Grupotel.com Muro	34	20	14	2834	2702	54	Promotion playoffs
6	CajaRioja	34	19	15	2655	2537	53	Promotion playoffs
7	Provincia de Palencia	34	18	16	2570	2443	52	Promotion playoffs
8	Cibo Llíria	34	17	17	2638	2650	51	Promotion playoffs
9	CB Prat	34	16	18	2564	2607	50	
10	Qalat Caja San Fernando	34	16	18	2632	2637	50	
11	WTC Cornellà	34	15	19	2684	2616	49	
12	Plasencia Galco	34	15	19	2528	2609	49	
13	Calpe Aguas de Calpe	34	15	19	2489	2499	49	
14	Clínicas Rincón Axarquía	34	14	20	2573	2677	48	
15	Imaje Sabadell Gapsa	34	14	20	2566	2721	48	
16	CAI Huesca La Magia	34	13	21	2578	2692	47	Relegation playoffs
17	Gestibérica Ciudad de Vigo	34	12	22	2436	2644	46	Relegation playoffs
18	Real Madrid B	34	7	27	2345	2696	41	Relegation to LEB Bronce

== Promotion playoffs ==
Quarter Finals
1	Ciudad de La Laguna	3
8	Cibo Llíria	0
4	Akasvayu Vic	3
5	Grupotel.com Muro	2
2	Beirasar Rosalía	3
7	Provincia de Palencia	0
3	Ourense Baloncesto	3
6	CajaRioja	1

SemiFinals
1	Ciudad de La Laguna	3
4	Akasvayu Vic	2
2	Beirasar Rosalía	3
3	Ourense Baloncesto	0

Finals
1	Ciudad de La Laguna	69
2	Beirasar Rosalía	81

== Relegation playoffs ==
Finals
16	CAI Huesca	3
17	Gestibérica Vigo	1

== MVP of the regular season ==
- (United States) Jason Blair (Grupotel.com Muro)
