= Will Hanley =

American-Irish basketball player

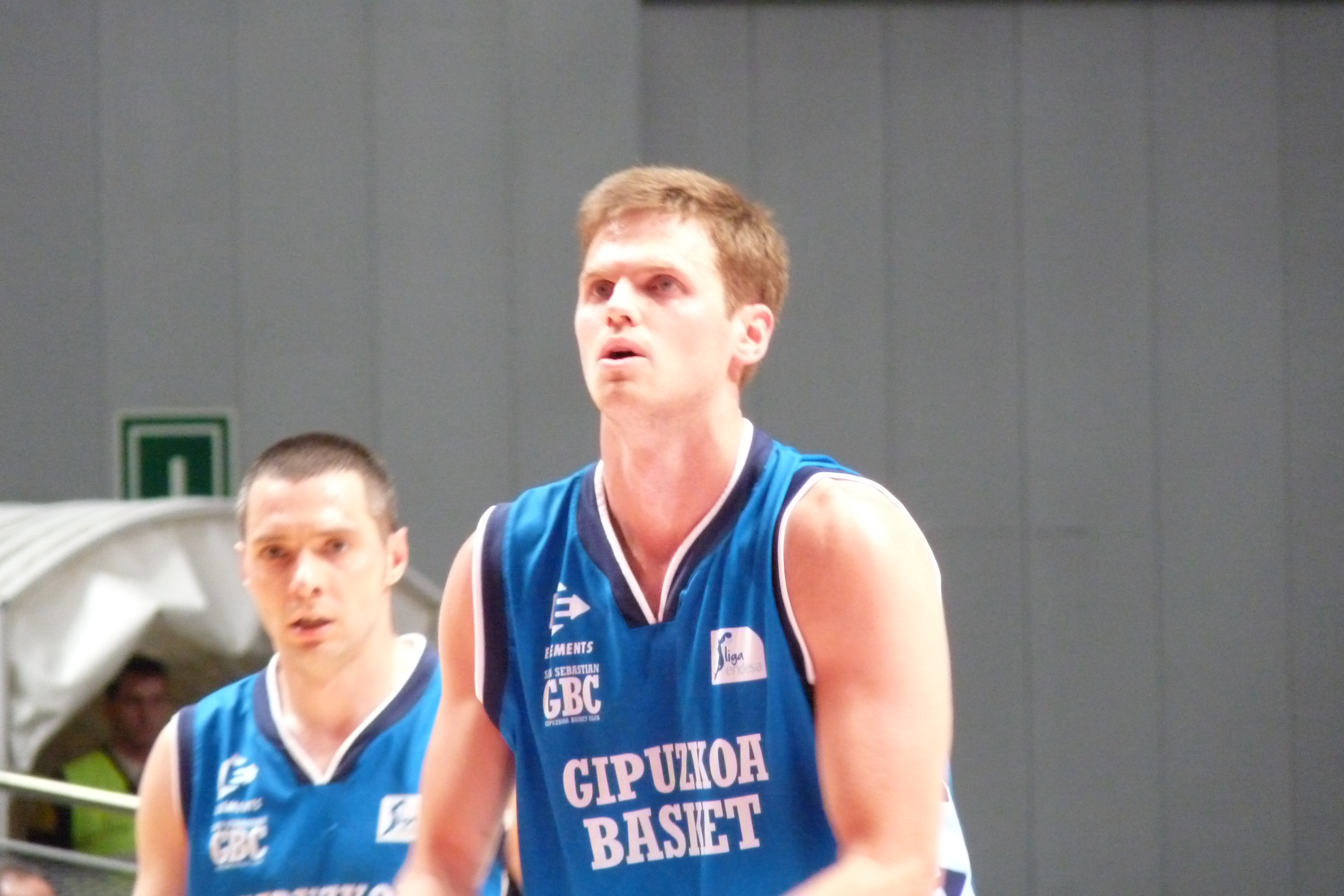

Free agent
- Position: Center / power forward

Personal information
- Born: 12 March 1990 (age 36) Stamford, Connecticut
- Listed height: 2.01 m (6 ft 7 in)
- Listed weight: 98 kg (216 lb)

Career information
- High school: New Canaan (New Canaan, Connecticut)
- College: Bowdoin (2009–2012)
- NBA draft: 2012: undrafted
- Playing career: 2012–present

Career history
- 2012–2013: Oviedo CB
- 2013: Valencia Basket
- 2013–2015: Gipuzkoa BC
- 2015–2017: Iberostar Tenerife
- 2017–2018: FC Porto
- 2018–2019: Passlab Yamagata Wyverns
- 2019–2019: Caen Basket Calvados
- 2019–2020: Hebraica Macabi

Career highlights
- Champions League champion (2017); LEB Plata MVP (2013)

Will Hanley (born March 12, 1990) is an American-Irish professional basketball player for the Hebraica Macabi team of the Liga Uruguaya de Basketball. He graduated from Bowdoin College in Brunswick, Maine in 2012, after having been named All-State at New Canaan High School in New Canaan, Connecticut in 2008.

== College career ==
At Bowdoin, during his senior year (2011–2012), he led the NESCAC conference in rebounding (11.4), was second in scoring (18.4), and sixth in assists (4.04). For the season, was named the Maine State Player of the Year, First team All-Conference (for the second consecutive year), and Second Team All-Northeast.

In his junior year, he led the conference in scoring (19.8) and was second in rebounding (11.3)

== Professional career ==
In 2012, Hanley started his pro career at Oviedo CB, team of LEB Plata league, the Spanish third Division. Hanley quickly began to make a name for himself, widely known by the nickname "El Caballo Blanco".

In March 2013, his team, Oviedo CB, won the LEB Plata championship and was promoted to LEB Oro. Hanley finished as the league's top scorer and rebounder, and MVP. One week after being named MVP, he signed with Valencia Basket of the Liga ACB to help the team after it lost several players to injury.

On July 12, 2013, Hanley signed a two-year contract to play with the Gipuzkoa BC in the Liga ACB in Spain.

In August 2015, Hanley signed with the Spanish team Iberostar Tenerife winning the 2017 Basketball Champions League Final Four. He left Tenerife after the conclusion of the 2016–17 season and signed with FC Porto of the Portuguese top-flight LPB in August 2017.

Following FC Porto's loss in the LPB finals, Hanley left the team to sign with the Passlab Yamagata Wyverns of the Japanese B.League. He began training with the Wyverns in August 2018.

On February 10, 2019, Hanley was released by the Wyverns.

Hanley signed a contract through the end of the season with the Caen Basket Calvados club in Caen, France on February 18, 2019. Caen competes in the LNB ProB League in France.

In October, 2019, Hanley agreed to terms with the Hebraica Macabi team of the Liga Uruguaya de Basketball. They compete in the top division of Uruguayan basketball.

== Trophies and achievements ==
=== Club ===
Oviedo CB

- LEB Plata (1): 2012–13

Iberostar Tenerife

- Champions League (1): 2016–17

=== Individual ===
- LEB Plata MVP: 2012–13

== Fun Facts ==
- Will claims to have invented the 3:30 dinner - a now popular trend in New York City.
