= CB Bahía San Agustín =

Fibwi Palma
- Leagues: Primera FEB
- Founded: 2007
- Arena: Son Moix
- Capacity: 5,076
- Location: Palma, Spain
- Team colors: Black, red and white
- President: Guillem Boscana
- Head coach: Alex Formento
- Website: bahiasanagustin.es
Home	Away

CB Bahía San Agustín, more commonly known as Fibwi Mallorca Bàsquet Palma for sponsorship reasons, is a basketball team based in Palma, Spain. The team currently competes in the Primera FEB, the second tier of Spanish basketball.

== History ==
The club was created in 2007 after the merge of two clubs in the island, that in previous years agreed collaboration terms:

- CB San Agustín (1972)
- CB Imprenta Bahía (1982)

After resigning to promote to LEB Plata in 2011, the next season promotes again to this league and this time accepts to play this league, the third one in the Spanish basketball league system.

In May 2013, the team promotes to LEB Oro, but decided to continue playing at LEB Plata. One year later, they would be defeated by CB Prat in the promotion playoffs final, but finally promoted to LEB Oro after achieving a vacant berth.

Its women's club promoted to Liga Femenina 2 in 2013 but was relegated to the third tier in 2017.

In 2019, the club played the Final Four for promoting to Liga ACB, but it was defeated in the final by Bilbao Basket.

== Sponsorship naming ==
- Palma Playa Park: 2007–2009
- Palma Bàsquet: 2009–2010
- Platja de Palma: 2010–2012
- Palma Air Europa: 2012–2017
- Iberostar Palma: 2017–2018
- Iberojet Palma: 2018–2019
- B the travel brand Mallorca-Palma: 2019–2020
- Palmer Alma Mediterrànea Palma: 2020–2022
- Fibwi Mallorca Bàsquet Palma: 2022–present

== Logos ==
2018–19 logo

== Players ==
=== Current roster ===
Note: Flags indicate national team eligibility at FIBA-sanctioned events. Players may hold other non-FIBA nationalities not displayed.

CB Bahía San Agustín roster
Players
Coaches

Pos.	No.	Nat.	Name	Ht.	Age
PG	1	(Portugal)	Ferreira, Hugo	1.85 m (6 ft 1 in)	25 – 28 July 2001
SF	3	(Serbia)	Simeunović, Đorđe	2.01 m (6 ft 7 in)	31 – 26 April 1995
F/C	5	(United States)	Jackson, Shilo	2.06 m (6 ft 9 in)	23 – 25 July 2003
SG	6	(Spain)	Scariolo, Alessandro	1.90 m (6 ft 3 in)	24 – 21 October 2001
C	7	(Spain)	Cerdá, Osi	2.17 m (7 ft 1 in)	21 – 4 June 2005
PG	8	(Spain)	Moncanut, Adrià	1.83 m (6 ft 0 in)	24 – 6 October 2002
SF	10	(Spain)	Beraza, Xabier	1.99 m (6 ft 6 in)	27 – 26 January 1999
SG	12	(Spain)	Huguet, Sergi	1.95 m (6 ft 5 in)	24 – 31 August 2002
SF	13	(Lithuania)	Matulionis, Osvaldas	2.00 m (6 ft 7 in)	35 – 19 August 1991
SG	20	(Spain)	Lobo, Jaume	1.80 m (5 ft 11 in)	29 – 31 July 1997
SG	33	(United States)	Bracey, Lysander	1.93 m (6 ft 4 in)	29 – 1 November 1996
F/C	34	(Democratic Republic of the Congo)	Kande, Garmine	2.05 m (6 ft 9 in)	27 – 24 August 1999

Head coach

- (Spain) Alex Formento

Legend

- (C) Team captain
- Injured

=== Depth chart ===
Pos.	Starting 5	Bench 1	Bench 2
C	Shilo Jackson	Osi Cerdá
PF	Xabier Beraza	Garmine Kande
SF	Osvaldas Matulionis	Đorđe Simeunović
SG	Lysander Bracey	Sergi Huguet	Alessandro Scariolo
PG	Adrià Moncanut	Hugo Ferreira	Jaume Lobo

Colours: Blue = homegrown player; Red = non-FIBA Europe player

== Season by season ==
=== Men's team ===
Season	Tier	Division	Pos.	W–L	Cup competitions	
2006–07	4	Liga EBA	12th	7–19		
2007–08	5	Liga EBA	3rd	14–17		
2008–09	5	Liga EBA	2nd	25–8		
2009–10	4	Liga EBA	3rd	20–10		
2010–11	4	Liga EBA	1st (Note: Resigned to promote to LEB Plata.)	27–3		
2011–12	4	Liga EBA	1st	20–6		
2012–13	3	LEB Plata	2nd (Note: Resigned to promote to LEB Oro.)	18–12		
2013–14	3	LEB Plata	3rd (Note: Achieved a vacant berth in LEB Oro.)	21–12		
2014–15	2	LEB Oro	6th	16–14		
2015–16	2	LEB Oro	10th	14–16		
2016–17	2	LEB Oro	8th	21–18		
2017–18	2	LEB Oro	13th	13–21		
2018–19	2	LEB Oro	3rd	26–15		
2019–20	2	LEB Oro	7th (Note: Season curtailed due to the COVID-19 pandemic.)	15–9		
2020–21	2	LEB Oro	7th	16–15		
2021–22	2	LEB Oro	17th	10–24		
2022–23	3	LEB Plata	7th	19–11		
2023–24	3	LEB Plata	20th	10–16		
2024–25	3	Segunda FEB	1st	24–4	Spain Cup	GS
2025–26	2	Primera FEB	14th	10–22	Spain Cup	R32
2026–27	2	Primera FEB			Spain Cup	R32

=== Women's team ===
Season	Tier	Division	Pos.
2007–08	3	1ª División	10th
2008–09	3	1ª División	6th
2009–10	3	1ª División	4th
2010–11	3	1ª División	1st
2011–12	3	1ª División	2nd
2012–13	3	1ª División	1st
2013–14	2	Liga Femenina 2	8th
2014–15	2	Liga Femenina 2	6th
2015–16	2	Liga Femenina 2	7th
2016–17	2	Liga Femenina 2	13th

== Notable players ==
Note: Flags indicate national team eligibility at FIBA-sanctioned events. Players may hold other non-FIBA nationalities not displayed.

Criteria

To appear in this section a player must have either:

- Set a club record or won an individual award while at the club
- Played at least one official international match for their national team at any time
- Played at least one official NBA match at any time.

- (Argentina) Máximo Fjellerup
- (Azerbaijan) (United States) Wesley Van Beck
- (Bulgaria) Konstantin Kostadinov
- (Estonia) Kristian Kullamäe
- (Norway) Karamo Jawara
- (Sweden) Alexander Lindqvist
- (United States) (Israel) John DiBartolomeo
