= CB Prat =

- Leagues: LEB Oro
- Founded: 1951; 74 years ago
- Arena: Pavelló Joan Busquets
- Location: El Prat de Llobregat, Spain
- Team colors: White and blue
- President: Arseni Conde
- Championships: 1 Copa LEB Plata; 1 Liga EBA Championship
- Website: www.cbprat.cat
Home	Away

Club Bàsquet Prat is a basketball team based in El Prat de Llobregat, Catalonia (Spain). The team currently plays in league LEB Plata.

== History ==
Basketball arrived to El Prat de Llobregat in 1932 with the constitution of the Esplai Grupo 49 in the Federation of Young Christians of Catalonia. Basketball continued being played in the parish of Sant Pere i Sant Pau before 1951, when the Club Bàsquet Prat is founded.

The club started playing in the regional leagues until 1962, when the club achieves promotion the Spanish second division for the first time in its history; remaining in the league after their debut season, by winning the relegation playoffs.

In the 1990s the club signs a collaboration agreement with former EuroLeague winner Joventut Badalona, becoming its affiliated team and playing with the name of CB Prat Joventut.

In 2003, the club promotes to LEB Plata, third tier, by beating Colmenar Viejo and Granollers in the matches of the Final Eight.

Since its promotion, the club consolidated in LEB Plata until 2014, when it won the Copa LEB Plata and promoted to LEB Oro. In its first season, the club was relegated to LEB Plata again, but remained in the league after being reinstated due to the existence of vacant places.

In 2016, CB Prat terminated its collaboration agreement with Joventut Badalona. Two years later, the club qualified for the first time to the playoffs, where they reached the semifinals, being eliminated in the last match of the series by Club Melilla Baloncesto.

== Players ==
=== Current roster ===
Note: Flags indicate national team eligibility at FIBA-sanctioned events. Players may hold other non-FIBA nationalities not displayed.

CB Prat roster
Players
Coaches

Pos.	No.	Nat.	Name	Ht.	Age
F	31	(Spain)	Blanch, Marc	1.95 m (6 ft 5 in)	43 – 12 January 1982
F	20	(Colombia)	Ibargüen, Andrés	1.98 m (6 ft 6 in)	29 – 14 February 1996
G	11	(Spain)	Coffi, Juan	1.94 m (6 ft 4 in)	26 – 7 August 1998
G	4	(United States)	Crockett, TJ	1.85 m (6 ft 1 in)
C	11	(Spain)	Creus, Joan	1.85 m (6 ft 1 in)	33 – 11 January 1992
F	12	(Spain)	Domènech, Adrià	2.05 m (6 ft 9 in)	22 – 18 July 2002
C		(Latvia)	Helmanis, Kriss	2.05 m (6 ft 9 in)	22 – 7 April 2002
F	1	(Netherlands)	Kraag, Yannick	2.03 m (6 ft 8 in)	22 – 16 October 2002
F		(Hungary)	Maronka, Zsombor	2.08 m (6 ft 10 in)	22 – 10 September 2002
F	21	(Spain)	Allen, Miguel	2.03 m (6 ft 8 in)	21 – 10 May 2003
G	6	(Spain)	Olivier, Pol	1.88 m (6 ft 2 in)	30 – 24 September 1994
F	10	(Spain)	Parrado, Arnau	2.04 m (6 ft 8 in)	24 – 24 June 2000
G	3	(Spain)	Costa, Sergi	1.88 m (6 ft 2 in)	28 – 4 September 1996
C		(Spain)	Rey, Xavi	2.11 m (6 ft 11 in)	37 – 13 July 1987

Head coach

- (Spain) Josep Berrocal

Legend

- (C) Team captain
- Injured

- Roster
Updated: September 5, 2020

=== Depth chart ===
Pos.	Starting 5	Bench 1	Bench 2
C	Xavier Rey	John Florveus	Miguel Allen
PF	Andres Ibarguen	Zsombor Maronka	Marc Blanch
SF	Adrià Domènech	Kriss Helmanis	Alex Llorca
SG	Juan Coffi	Yannick Kraag	Pol Olivier
PG	TJ Crockett	Arnau Parrado	Sergi Costa

Colours: Blue = homegrown player; Red = non–FIBA Europe player

== Season by season ==
Season	Tier	Division	Pos.	W–L	Cup competitions	
1999–00	3	Liga EBA	5th	14–12		
2000–01	4	Liga EBA	10th	13–17		
2001–02	4	Liga EBA	2nd	26–7		
2002–03	4	Liga EBA	1st	25–6		
2003–04	4	Liga EBA	4th	19–11		
2004–05	4	Liga EBA	1st	26–6		
2005–06	4	Liga EBA	2nd	25–10		
2006–07	3	LEB 2	9th	16–18		
2007–08	3	LEB Plata	16th	11–23		
2008–09	3	LEB Plata	12th	11–19		
2009–10	3	LEB Plata	11th	13–19		
2010–11	3	LEB Plata	6th	18–14		
2011–12	3	LEB Plata	3rd	21–13		
2012–13	3	LEB Plata	6th	14–8		
2013–14	3	LEB Plata	2nd	24–11	Copa LEB Plata	C
2014–15	2	LEB Oro	15th (Note: Remained in the league after achieving a vacant berth.)	5–23		
2015–16	2	LEB Oro	14th	10–20		
2016–17	2	LEB Oro	13th	13–21		
2017–18	2	LEB Oro	4th	30–12		
2018–19	2	LEB Oro	16th	9–25		
2019–20	3	LEB Plata	4th (Note: Season curtailed due to the COVID-19 pandemic.)	17–8		

== Notable players ==
- (Spain) Pau Ribas
- (Spain) Guillem Vives
- (Montenegro) Marko Todorović
- (Netherlands) Henk Norel
- (Latvia) Artūrs Žagars
- (Democratic Republic of the Congo) Christian Eyenga

== Trophies and awards ==
=== Trophies ===
- Copa LEB Plata: (1)
  - 2014
- Liga EBA: (1)
  - 2006

=== Individual awards ===
LEB Plata MVP

- Marko Todorović – 2012
