= Zornotza ST =

Zornotza
- Founded: 1959
- Arena: Polideportivo Larrea
- Location: Amorebieta-Etxano, Spain
- Team colors: Red and green
- Head coach: Mikel Garitaonandia
- Website: www.zornotzast.eus
Home

Zornotza Saskibaloi Taldea, also known as Ametx Zornotza for sponsorship reasons, is a basketball team based in Amorebieta-Etxano, Spain.

== History ==
After several seasons in Primera División, the club rose to Liga EBA thanks to the expansion of the group A of the league. After three seasons in the fourth tier, the club surprisingly promoted to LEB Plata, where it played until 2017. In its last season, Zornotza reached the final of the promotion playoffs to LEB Oro, but was finally eliminated by Comercial Ulsa Ciudad de Valladolid.

On 18 July 2017, the club announced it could not fulfill the requirements in the league and it will appeal against the decision of FEB.

== Season by season ==
Season	Tier	Division	Pos.	W–L
2005–06	5	1ª División	7th	18–12
2006–07	5	1ª División	8th	11–15
2007–08	6	1ª División	9th	12–16
2008–09	6	1ª División	8th	15–13
2009–10	5	1ª División	3rd (Note: Promoted to Liga EBA after an expansion of the group A.)	17–11
2010–11	4	Liga EBA	7th	12–1–9
2011–12	4	Liga EBA	9th	13–11
2012–13	4	Liga EBA	4th	16–9
2013–14	3	LEB Plata	9th	11–16
2014–15	3	LEB Plata	4th	20–13
2015–16	3	LEB Plata	10th	10–16
2016–17	3	LEB Plata	3rd (Note: Demoted to Liga EBA after not being admitted in LEB Plata.)	24–19
2017–18	4	Liga EBA	2nd (Note: Achieved one of the places after the expansion of the LEB Plata.)	32–3
2018–19	3	LEB Plata	7th	16–18
2019–20	3	LEB Plata	20th (Note: Season curtailed due to the COVID-19 pandemic.)	9–16
