= 2014–15 LEB Plata season =

LEB Plata
- Season: 2014–15
- Games played: 210 (Regular season)
- Teams: 15
- TV partners: TVE, FORTA

Regular season
- Season MVP: (United States) Nick Washburn
- Relegated: Opentach Bàsquet Pla; Sáenz Horeca Araberri

Finals
- Champions: Cáceres Patrimonio de la Humanidad
- All statistics correct as of 25 September 2014.

The 2014–15 LEB Plata season is the 14th season of the LEB Plata, the Spanish basketball third division. It is named Adecco Plata as its sponsored identity.

== Team information and location ==
Location of teams in 2014–15 LEB Plata

Team	City	Arena	Coach
Amics Castelló	Castellón de la Plana	Pabellón Ciutat de Castelló	Antonio Ten
Cáceres Patrimonio de la Humanidad	Cáceres	Multiusos Ciudad de Cáceres	Ñete Bohígas
Canarias Basketball Academy Gran Canaria	Las Palmas	Centro Insular de Deportes	Pepe Carrión
CB Tarragona	Tarragona	Polideportivo El Serrallo	Berni Álvarez
CEBA Guadalajara	Guadalajara	Polideportivo San José	Javier Juárez
FC Barcelona B	Sant Joan Despí	Ciutat Esportiva Joan Gamper	Aleix Durán
Grupo Eulen Carrefour "El Bulevar" de Ávila	Ávila	Multiusos Carlos Sastre	David Mangas
Lucentum Alicante	Alicante	Pabellón Pedro Ferrándiz	Kuko Cruza
Marín Peixegalego	Marín	A Raña	Sergio Cubeiro
Opentach Bàsquet Pla	Marratxí	Municipal	Toni Martorell
Sáenz Horeca Araberri	Vitoria-Gasteiz	Polideportivo Mendizorroza	Txus Brizuela
Sammic ISB	Azpeitia	Polideportivo Municipal	Iurgi Caminos
Viten Getafe	Getafe	Pabellón Juan de la Cierva	Armando Gómez
Xuven Cambados	Cambados	O Pombal	Yago Casal
Zornotza ST	Amorebieta-Etxano	Polideportivo Larrea	Mikel Garitaonandia

- Notes: Viten Getafe is the new name of last season's champion Fundación Baloncesto Fuenlabrada, the reserve team of Baloncesto Fuenlabrada. It was moved to Getafe after an agreement with the club CB Getafe.

== Regular season league table ==
Pos	Team	Pld	W	L	PF	PA	PD	Pts	Promotion, qualification or relegation
1	Cáceres Patrimonio de la Humanidad	28	23	5	2136	1848	+288	51	Promotion to LEB Oro
2	Amics Castelló (X)	28	22	6	2368	2002	+366	50	Qualification to promotion playoffs
3	CEBA Guadalajara	28	19	9	2011	1742	+269	47	Qualification to promotion playoffs
4	Zornotza ST	28	18	10	2182	2092	+90	46	Qualification to promotion playoffs
5	Lucentum Alicante	28	18	10	1986	1808	+178	46	Qualification to promotion playoffs
6	Marín Peixegalego	28	16	12	1999	1960	+39	44	Qualification to promotion playoffs
7	Xuven Cambados	28	16	12	1920	1885	+35	44	Qualification to promotion playoffs
8	Viten Getafe	28	15	13	1872	1890	−18	43	Qualification to promotion playoffs
9	Grupo Eulen Carrefour "El Bulevar" de Ávila	28	15	13	1862	1882	−20	43	Qualification to promotion playoffs
10	CB Tarragona	28	12	16	1965	1982	−17	40	
11	Canarias Basketball Academy Gran Canaria	28	9	19	1784	2008	−224	37	
12	Sammic ISB	28	9	19	1970	2105	−135	37	
13	FC Barcelona B	28	9	19	1942	2062	−120	37	
14	Opentach Bàsquet Pla	28	7	21	1898	2154	−256	35	Relegation to Liga EBA
15	Sáenz Horeca Araberri	28	2	26	1913	2382	−469	30	Relegation to Liga EBA

Source: Adecco Plata
(X) Copa LEB Plata champion

== Playoffs ==
Quarterfinals
2	Amics Castelló	80	75	X
9	Grupo Eulen Carrefour "El Bulevar" de Ávila	58	67	X
5	Lucentum Alicante	77	69	66
6	Marín Peixegalego	53	76	64
3	CEBA Guadalajara	82	74	X
8	Viten Getafe	53	62	X
4	Zornotza ST	91	75	X
7	Xuven Cambados	70	73	X

Semifinals
2	Amics Castelló	67	79	68	69	76
5	Lucentum Alicante	69	68	59	72	67
3	CEBA Guadalajara	67	82	80	X	X
4	Zornotza ST	57	67	75	X	X

Finals
2	Amics Castelló	89	80	78	71	80
3	CEBA Guadalajara	67	72	86	72	77

== Copa LEB Plata ==
At the half of the league, the two first teams in the table play the Copa LEB Plata at home of the winner of the first half season (13th round). If this team doesn't want to host the Copa LEB Plata, the second qualified can do it. If nobody wants to host it, the Federation will propose a neutral venue.

The Champion of this Cup will play the play-offs as first qualified if it finishes the league between the 2nd and the 5th qualified.

=== Teams qualified ===
Amics Castelló is the first qualified as the leader of the first half of the season.

Pos	Team	Pld	W	L	PF	PA	PD	Pts
1	Amics Castelló	14	13	1	1198	990	+208	27
2	CEBA Guadalajara	14	10	4	999	858	+141	24

=== The game ===
7 February 2015
19:30

Report

Amics Castelló	88–73	CEBA Guadalajara
Scoring by quarter: 17–10, 30–19, 24–20, 17–24
Pts: Washburn 25; Rebs: Washburn 10; Asts: J. García 5 PIR: Washburn 27		Pts: Frutos 20; Rebs: Agbelese 7 Asts: Lázaro 4 PIR: James 24
Amics Castelló, winner of the Copa LEB Plata

Pabellón Ciutat de Castelló, Castellón de la Plana
Attendance: 3,000
Referees: Carpallo Miguélez, Padrós Feliu, Torres Sánchez

== Final standings ==
Pos.	Team	GP	W	L	Promotion or relegation
1	Cáceres Patrimonio de la Humanidad	28	23	5	Promoted to LEB Oro
2	Amics Castelló	40	30	10	Promoted to LEB Oro
3	CEBA Guadalajara	38	26	12	
4	Zornotza ST	33	20	13	
5	Lucentum Alicante	36	22	14	
6	Marín Peixegalego	31	17	14	
7	Xuven Cambados	30	16	14	
8	Viten Getafe	30	15	15	
9	Grupo Eulen Carrefour "El Bulevar" de Ávila	30	15	15	
10	CB Tarragona	28	12	16	
11	Canarias Basketball Academy Gran Canaria	28	9	19	
12	Sammic ISB	28	9	19	
13	FC Barcelona B	28	9	19	
14	Opentach Bàsquet Pla	28	7	21	Relegated to Liga EBA
15	Sáenz Horeca Araberri	28	2	26	Relegated to Liga EBA

== Stats leaders in regular season ==
=== Points ===
Rk	Name	Team	Games	Points	PPG
1	(United States) Ridge McKeither	Opentach Bàsquet Pla	27	478	17.7
2	(United States) Nick Washburn	Amics Castelló	28	465	16.6
3	(Spain) Edu Durán	CEBA Guadalajara	27	443	16.4
4	(United States) Tre Bowman	Zornotza Saskibaloi Taldea	26	416	16.0
5	(Bosnia and Herzegovina) Emir Sulejmanović	FC Barcelona B	21	298	15.4

=== Rebounds ===
Rk	Name	Team	Games	Rebounds	RPG
1	(United States) Dane Johnson	Grupo Eulen Carrefour "El Bulevar" de Ávila	24	219	9.1
2	(Spain) Alberto Ausina	Opentach Bàsquet Pla	28	252	9.0
3	(United States) Danny Agbelese	CEBA Guadalajara	28	250	8.9
4	(United States) Evan Yates	Sáenz Horeca Araberri	26	225	8.6
5	(Bosnia and Herzegovina) Emir Sulejmanović	FC Barcelona B	21	177	8.4

=== Assists ===
Rk	Name	Team	Games	Assists	APG
1	(Spain) José Antonio Marco	Cáceres Patrimonio de la Humanidad	25	178	7.1
2	(Spain) Álvaro Frutos	CEBA Guadalajara	27	100	3.7
3	(Spain) Joan Faner	Amics Castelló	24	88	3.7
4	(Spain) Ander Arruti	Sammic ISB	27	92	3.4
5	(Spain) José María García	Amics Castelló	28	95	3.4

=== Performance Index Rating ===
Rk	Name	Team	Games	Rating	PIR
1	(United States) Nick Washburn	Amics Castelló	28	561	20.0
2	(United States) Evan Yates	Sáenz Horeca Araberri	26	488	18.8
3	(United States) Ridge McKeither	Opentach Bàsquet Pla	27	459	17.0
4	(Spain) Alberto Ausina	Opentach Bàsquet Pla	28	470	16.8
5	(Serbia) Sasa Borovnjak	Zornotza Saskibaloi Taldea	28	466	16.6

== See also ==
- 2014–15 ACB season
- 2014–15 LEB Oro season
