= Araberri BC =

Sáenz Horeca Araberri
- Founded: 1994; 31 years ago
- History: AD Phoenix; 1994–2009; Araberri Basket Club; 2009–present
- Arena: Polideportivo Mendizorrotza
- Capacity: 2,603
- Location: Vitoria-Gasteiz, Spain
- Team colors: Black and orange
- President: Oscar Vázquez
- Championships: 1 Liga EBA championship 1 Copa LEB Plata
- Website: araberri.eus
Home	Away

Araberri Basket Club, also known as Sáenz Horeca Araberri for sponsorship reasons, is a basketball team based in Vitoria-Gasteiz, Spain.

== History ==
Founded in 1994. In June 2011, the team promoted to LEB Plata, where it won one Copa LEB Plata and promoted to LEB Oro as winner of the playoffs in 2016.

Despite this achievement, on 23 July 2016 the club announced it could not fulfill the requirements in the league and folded the professional team, maintaining only the youth teams. However, one month later Araberri was allowed to participate in the league and the professional team was reinstated. On 18 July 2017, the club announced it could not fulfill the requirements in the league and it appealed against the decision of FEB. However, they were finally admitted and registered for playing the 2017–18 LEB Oro season.

On July 5, 2019, the club folded the professional team, maintaining only the youth teams.

== Logos ==
Official logo

Alternative logo

== Season by season ==
Season	Tier	Division	Pos.	W–L	Cup competitions	
2002–03	7	1ª Provincial	1st			
2003–04	6	1ª Autonómica	6th			
2004–05	6	1ª Autonómica	2nd			
2005–06	5	1ª División	9th	16–14		
2006–07	5	1ª División	5th	17–9		
2007–08	6	1ª División	2nd	22–9		
2008–09	6	1ª División	1st	23–5		
2009–10	4	Liga EBA	4th	16–12		
2010–11	4	Liga EBA	1st	25–3		
2011–12	3	LEB Plata	4th	17–14	Copa LEB Plata	C
2012–13	3	LEB Plata	7th	11–11		
2013–14	3	LEB Plata	8th	12–15		
2014–15	3	LEB Plata	15th (Note: Remained in LEB Plata after getting a vacant spot.)	2–26		
2015–16	3	LEB Plata	2nd	25–11		
2016–17	2	LEB Oro	12th	14–20		
2017–18	2	LEB Oro	11th	15–19		
2018–19	2	LEB Oro	18th	7–27		

== Trophies and awards ==
=== Trophies ===
- Copa LEB Plata: (1)
  - 2012
- Liga EBA: (1)
  - 2011
- Euskal Kopa: (3)
  - 2013, 2015, 2016

== Notable players ==
To appear in this section a player must have either:

- Set a club record or won an individual award as a professional player.
- Played at least one official international match for his senior national team at any time.

- (Armenia) Artem Tavakalyan
- (Democratic Republic of the Congo) Mathieu Kamba
- (Indonesia) Lester Prosper
