= CEBA Guadalajara =

- Leagues: Primera División
- Founded: 2011
- Arena: Polideportivo San José (Capacity: 2,500)
- Location: Guadalajara, Spain
- Team colors: Navy and white
- Championships: 1 Copa LEB Plata
- Website: cdeba.es
Home	Away

CDE Escuela de Baloncesto Alcarreña is a basketball team based in Guadalajara, Spain that currently plays in Primera División, fifth tier.

== History ==
The club was founded in 2011 with the aim to substitute dissolved CB Guadalajara. In August 2012, the team achieved one of the vacant berths in LEB Plata.

In its first season, CEBA Guadalajara was the champion of the Copa LEB Plata after beating Unión Financiera Asturiana Oviedo Baloncesto by 78–71.

In July 2015, the club saw no forthcoming support so decided to resign itself to the spot in LEB Plata and to play in the fifth tier.

== Season by season ==
Season	Tier	Division	Pos.	W–L	Cup competitions	
2012–13	3	LEB Plata	4th	13–12	Copa LEB Plata	C
2013–14	3	LEB Plata	6th	14–13		
2014–15	3	LEB Plata	3rd (Note: Resigned to its place in LEB Plata.)	26–12	Copa LEB Plata	RU
2015–16	5	1ª División	4th	15–8		
2016–17	5	1ª División	4th	13–10		

== Trophies and awards ==
=== Trophies ===
- Copa LEB Plata: (1)
  - 2013
