= Segunda FEB =

- Formerly: LEB 2 (2000–2007); LEB Plata (2007–2024)
- Founded: 2000; 26 years ago
- First season: 2000–01
- Country: Spain
- Confederation: FIBA Europe
- Number of teams: 28
- Level on pyramid: 3
- Promotion to: Primera FEB
- Relegation to: Tercera FEB
- Domestic cup(s): Spain Cup; Copa LEB Plata (defunct)
- Current champions: Coto Córdoba CB (1st title) (2025–26)
- Most championships: Iraurgi SB (2 titles)
- Website: segundafeb.com
- 2025–26 season

The Segunda FEB, formerly known as LEB 2 and LEB Plata, is the third basketball division of the Spanish basketball league system and the second basketball division organized by the Spanish Basketball Federation. Since 2019, three teams are promoted to Primera FEB and six teams are relegated to Tercera FEB.

From the 2024–25 season, it is named Segunda FEB.

== LEB Plata history ==
Former LEB Plata logo (2015–2024).

=== League names ===
- 2000–2006: LEB 2
- 2006–2007: Adecco LEB 2
- 2007–2015: Adecco Plata
- 2015–2024: LEB Plata
- From 2024 onwards: Segunda FEB

=== Champions ===
Season	Champion	Other promoted teams	MVP
2000–01	Llobregat Centre Cornellà	CD Universidad Complutense	(United States) Rahshon Turner
2001–02	Basket Bilbao Berri	CB Tarragona	(United States) Melvin Simon
2002–03	CB Aracena	CBC Algeciras Cepsa	(United States) John Schuck
2003–04	Valls Félix Hotel	Calpe Aguas de Calpe	(United States) Shalawn Miller
2004–05	CB L'Hospitalet	Alcúdia-Aracena	(United States) Thomas Terrell
2005–06	Autocid Ford Burgos	Aguas de Valencia Gandía	(United States) Brett Beeson
2006–07	Beirasar Rosalía	Ciudad de La Laguna Canarias	(United States) Jason Blair
2007–08	Akasvayu Vic	Illescas Urban CLM	(United States) Stevie Johnson
2008–09	Faymasa Palencia	WTC Almeda Park Cornellà	(Haiti) Robert Joseph
2009–10	Fundación Adepal Alcázar	Lobe Huesca	(United States) Ronald Thompson
2010–11	Knet Rioja	Iberostar Mallorca Bàsquet	(United States) Ian O'Leary
2011–12	River Andorra	Aguas de Sousas Ourense	(Montenegro) Marko Todorović
2012–13	Unión Financiera Asturiana Oviedo Baloncesto	Palma Air Europa	(United States) Will Hanley
2013–14	Fundación Baloncesto Fuenlabrada	CB Prat	(Nigeria) Ola Atoyebi
2014–15	Cáceres Patrimonio de la Humanidad	Amics Castelló	(United States) Nick Washburn
2015–16	Marín Ence Peixegalego	Sáenz Horeca Araberri	(United States) Javonte Green
2016–17	Sammic ISB	Comercial Ulsa Ciudad de Valladolid	(Spain) Sergio de la Fuente
2017–18	Covirán Granada	Real Canoe NC	(Spain) Tyson Pérez
2018–19	HLA Alicante	Afanion CB Almansa and Marín Ence PeixeGalego	(Spain) Jordi Trias
2019–20	Season curtailed due to the COVID-19 pandemic. (Note: Real Murcia was declared champion and promoted to LEB Oro alongside Bàsquet Girona and UBU Tizona.)		
2020–21	Juaristi ISB	Barça B and CB Prat	(Dominican Republic) Jean Montero
2021–22	Grupo Alega Cantabria CBT	Bueno Arenas Albacete Basket and Hereda Club Ourense Baloncesto	(Spain) Millán Jiménez
2022–23	UBU Tizona	CB Prat and Hestia Menorca	(Spain) Jorge Lafuente
2023–24	ODILO FC Cartagena CB	Zamora Enamora and CB Starlabs Morón	(France) Nicolas Pavrette
2024–25	Palmer Basket Mallorca Palma	Melilla Ciudad del Deporte and Fibwi Palma	
2025–26	Coto Córdoba CB	Insolac Caja'87 and Bueno Arenas Albacete Basket	

==== Performance by club ====
Club	Winners	Promotions	Winning years
Iraurgi SB	2	2	2016–17, 2020–21
CB Cornellà	1	2	2000–01
CB Marín Peixegalego	1	2	2015–16
Bilbao Basket	1	1	2001–02
CB Aracena	1	1	2002–03
CB Valls	1	1	2003–04
CB L'Hospitalet	1	1	2004–05
CB Atapuerca	1	1	2005–06
CI Rosalía de Castro	1	1	2006–07
CB Vic	1	1	2007–08
Palencia Baloncesto	1	1	2008–09
CDB Amistad y Deporte	1	1	2009–10
CB Clavijo	1	1	2010–11
BC Andorra	1	1	2011–12
Oviedo CB	1	1	2012–13
Fundación Baloncesto Fuenlabrada	1	1	2013–14
Cáceres Ciudad del Baloncesto	1	1	2014–15
Fundación CB Granada	1	1	2017–18
Fundación Lucentum Baloncesto	1	1	2018–19
CB Myrtia	1	1	2019–20
CD Estela	1	1	2021–22
CB Tizona	1	2	2022–23
Basket Cartagena	1	1	2023–24
Palmer Basket	1	1	2024–25
Córdoba CB	1	1	2025–26
CB Prat	0	3	
Club Ourense Baloncesto	0	2	
CB Bahía San Agustín	0	2	
Albacete Basket	0	2	
CD Universidad Complutense	0	1	
CB Tarragona	0	1	
CB Ciudad de Algeciras	0	1	
CB Calpe	0	1	
CB Alcúdia	0	1	
Gandía BA	0	1	
CB 1939 Canarias	0	1	
CB Illescas	0	1	
CB Peñas Huesca	0	1	
Bàsquet Mallorca	0	1	
AB Castelló	0	1	
Araberri BC	0	1	
CB Ciudad de Valladolid	0	1	
Real Canoe NC	0	1	
CB Almansa	0	1	
Bàsquet Girona	0	1	
FC Barcelona Bàsquet B	0	1	
CB Menorca	0	1	
CB Zamora	0	1	
CB Morón	0	1	
Club Melilla Baloncesto	0	1	
Insolac Caja'87	0	1	

== Current clubs ==
Location of teams in 2025–26 Segunda FEB
Red: Group East; Green: Group West

Team	Home city	Arena
Amics Castelló	Castellón de la Plana	Ciutat de Castelló
Biele ISB	Azpeitia	Municipal
Bueno Arenas Albacete Basket	Albacete	El Parque
Cáceres Patrimonio de la Humanidad	Cáceres	Multiusos Ciudad de Cáceres
Castillo de Gorraiz Valle de Egüés	Valle de Egüés	Maristas
Reina Proteínas Clavijo	Logroño	Palacio de los Deportes
CB Getafe	Getafe	Juan de la Cierva
CB Starlabs Morón	Morón de la Frontera	Alameda
CB Toledo Basket	Toledo	Javier Lozano Cid
CB Zaragoza	Zaragoza	Siglo XXI
Círculo Gijón	Gijón	Palacio de Deportes
Ciudad Molina Basket	Molina de Segura	Serrerías
Class Bàsquet Sant Antoni	Sant Antoni de Portmany	Sa Pedrera
Clínica Ponferrada SDP	Ponferrada	Pabellón Lydia Valentín
Club Esportiu Bàsquet Llíria	Llíria	Pla del Arc
Coto Córdoba CB	Córdoba	Vista Alegre
Cultural y Deportiva Leonesa	León	Palacio de los Deportes
Homs UE Mataró	Mataró	Josep Mora
Insolac Caja'87	Seville	San Pablo
Jaén Paraíso Interior CB	Jaén	La Salobreja
LogroBasket Logi7	Logroño	Lobete
Lobe Huesca La Magia	Huesca	Palacio Municipal de Huesca
Maderas Sorlí Benicarló	Benicarló	Pavelló Poliesportiu Municipal
OCA Global CB Salou	Salou	Centre Salou
Proinbeni UPB Gandia	Gandia	Municipal
Sol Gironès Bisbal Bàsquet	La Bisbal d'Empordà	Municipal
Spanish Basketball Academy	Alcorcón	SBA Arena
UEMC CBC Valladolid	Valladolid	Polideportivo Pisuerga

== Copa LEB Plata ==
The Copa LEB Plata (LEB Plata Cup) was a championship played from to 2001 to 2024.

In the first editions, the three top teams in the first half season and an organizer team played the Cup in a Final Four format. Since 2009, the teams who play this cup are two first qualified in the half season, and it's hosted by the first qualified. The winner of the Copa LEB Plata would be the first team in the play-offs if it finishes between the second and the fifth at the final of the Regular Season.

Year	Host	Winner	Runner-up	Score	MVP
2001	Algeciras	CB Tarragona	CB Cornellà	84–82	(Spain) Salva Camps
2002	Bilbao	Bilbao Basket	CB Tarragona	84–74	(Spain) Lucho Fernández
2003	Plasencia	CB Aracena	CB Plasencia	80–71	(United States) DeCarlo Deveaux
2004	Logroño	CB Clavijo	CI Rosalía de Castro	77–75	(Spain) Manu Coego
2005	Gandía	CB Atapuerca	Gandía Bàsquet	98–78	(United States) Tony Smith
2006	Pontevedra	CB Atapuerca	CB Peñas Huesca	88–78	(Argentina) Diego Guaita
2007	Santiago de Compostela	Club Ourense Baloncesto	CB 1939 Canarias	90–89	(Spain) Sony Vázquez
2008	Palencia	CB Vic	CB Illescas	66–64	(Dominican Republic) Eulis Báez
2009	Palencia	Palencia Baloncesto	CB L'Hospitalet	69–65	(Spain) Carles Bravo
2010	Huesca	CB Peñas Huesca	CD Huelva Baloncesto	89–67	(United States) Stevie Johnson
2011	Logroño	CB Clavijo	BC Andorra	79–72	(Brazil) Sidão Santana
2012	Andorra la Vella	Araberri BC	BC Andorra	82–74	(Spain) Alberto Ausina
2013	Guadalajara	CEBA Guadalajara	Oviedo CB	78–71	(Spain) Sergio Llorente
2014	Fuenlabrada	CB Prat	Baloncesto Fuenlabrada B	83–79	(Spain) Sergio Pérez
2015	Castellón de la Plana	AB Castelló	CEBA Guadalajara	88–73	(United States) Nick Washburn
2016	Ávila	CB Peixefresco	Óbila CB	76–66	(Spain) Antonio Pantín
2017	Granada	Fundación CB Granada	Fundación Lucentum Baloncesto	80–74	(Spain) Jesús Fernández
2018	Granada	Fundación CB Granada	CP La Roda	71–63	(United States) Devin Wright
2019	Alicante	Fundación Lucentum Baloncesto	CB Zamora	86–68	(Spain) Álex Galán
2020	Azpeitia	Iraurgi SB	Bàsquet Girona	74–69	(United States) Spencer Reaves
2021	Sant Joan Despí	Iraurgi SB	FC Barcelona Bàsquet B	84–82	(Spain) Ibon Guridi
2022	Amorebieta-Etxano	Zornotza ST	Sant Antoni Ibiza Feeling	66–64	(Spain) Alberto Cabrera
2023	Mahón	CB Tizona	CB Menorca	90–76	(United States) Joe Cremo
2024	Zamora	CB Zamora	Basket Cartagena	95–89	(Lithuania) Jonas Paukštė

=== Final Four Editions ===
==== 2001 ====
Semifinals
1	CB Cornellà	90
4	UB La Palma	77
3	CBC Algeciras	91
2	CB Tarragona	97

Final
CB Cornellà	82
CB Tarragona	84

==== 2002 ====
Semifinals
1	CB Tarragona	73
4	CB Guadalajara	68
3	Bilbao Basket	80
2	CB Calpe	66

Final
CB Tarragona	74
Bilbao Basket	84

==== 2003 ====
Semifinals
1	CB Plasencia	103
4	CB Galicia	73
3	CB Aracena	81
2	Gandía BA	67

Final
CB Plasencia	71
CB Aracena	80

==== 2004 ====
Semifinals
1	CI Rosalía de Castro	79
4	CB Valls	68
3	CB Clavijo	82
2	CB Atapuerca	76

Final
CI Rosalía de Castro	75
CB Clavijo	77

==== 2005 ====
Semifinals
1	CB Atapuerca	80
4	Gipuzkoa BC	66
3	Baloncesto Pozuelo	88
2	Gandía BA	98

Final
CB Atapuerca	98
Gandía BA	78

==== 2006 ====
Semifinals
1	CB Peñas Huesca	75
4	CB Ciudad de Pontevedra	71
3	CB Atapuerca	81
2	UB Sabadell	72

Final
CB Peñas Huesca	79
CB Atapuerca	88

==== 2007 ====
Semifinals
1	CB 1939 Canarias	91
4	Bàsquet Muro	84
3	Club Ourense Baloncesto	78
2	CI Rosalía de Castro	66

Final
CB 1939 Canarias	80
Club Ourense Baloncesto	90

==== 2008 ====
Semifinals
1	Palencia Baloncesto	65
4	CB Illescas	80
3	CB Vic	78
2	Gijón Baloncesto	69

Final
CB Illescas	64
CB Vic	66

Since 2009, the Copa LEB Plata is only played with the two top teams at the first half of the LEB Plata season

== Stat leaders at LEB Plata ==
Season	Top rating	PIR	Top scorer	PPG	Top rebounder	RPG	Top Assistant	APG
2000–01	(United States) Rahshon Turner	24.48	(Spain) Nacho Yáñez	21.83	(Venezuela) Richard Lugo	11.00	(Spain) Carlos Braña	4.20
2001–02	(United States) Melvin Simon	24.31	(United States) Danny Moore	20.60	(United States) Melvin Simon	10.69	(Spain) Fernando Pérez	4.15
2002–03	(United States) David Schuck	21.86	(Trinidad and Tobago) Duane Virgil	20.12	(United States) David Schuck	9.97	(Spain) José Báez	4.90
2003–04	(United States) Shalawn Miller	25.42	(United States) Tony Smith	22.69	(Spain) José Manuel Coego	11.31	(Spain) Lino López	4.96
2004–05	(United States) Thomas Terrell	30.39	(United States) Thomas Terrell	22.97	(Panama) Antonio García	13.07	(Spain) Lino López	5.10
2005–06	(United States) Brett Beeson	22.23	(United States) Tony Smith	21.03	(United States) Rammel Allen	9.84	(Spain) Jorge Jiménez	6.03
2006–07	(United States) Jason Blair	25.38	(United States) Brett Beeson	19.21	(United States) Jakim Donaldson	11.26	(Spain) Frederic Castelló	4.64
2007–08	(United States) Stevie Johnson	25.39	(United States) Stevie Johnson	21.39	(Brazil) Paulão Prestes	9.40	(Spain) Josep Marcos	4.66
2008–09	(Haiti) Robert Joseph	23.90	(United Kingdom) Tarick Johnson	20.11	(Spain) Pep Ortega	8.73	(Spain) Lino López	4.40
2010–11	(United States) Ian O'Leary	20.38	(United States) Mat Witt	16.39	(United States) Ian O'Leary	9.50	(United States) Mat Witt	6.04
2011–12	(Montenegro) Marko Todorović	20.38	(United States) Alfredo Ott	17.58	(United States) Alex Thompson	8.48	(Uruguay) Federico Bavosi	5.83
2012–13	(United States) Will Hanley	23.65	(United States) Will Hanley	17.65	(United States) Will Hanley	11.20	(Spain) Fran Cárdenas	6.35
2013–14	(Nigeria) Olasumbo Atoyebi	20.05	(Spain) Ibon Carreto	16.25	(Nigeria) Olasumbo Atoyebi	10.50	(Spain) José Antonio Marco	6.08
2014–15	(United States) Nick Washburn	20.04	(United States) Ridge McKeither	17.70	(United States) Dane Johnson	9.13	(Spain) José Antonio Marco	7.12
2015–16	(United States) Javonte Green	21.60	(United States) Gabe Rogers	18.38	(Spain) Jesús Fernández	10.17	(Spain) Javier Marín	4.42
2016–17	(Spain) Sergio de la Fuente	19.17	(Spain) Sergio de la Fuente	17.13	(Spain) Sergio de la Fuente	10.20	(United States) Lamonte Thomas	4.77
2017–18	(Dominican Republic) Tyson Pérez	20.57	(United Kingdom) Will Saunders	17.41	(Norway) Karamo Jawara	9.81	(Spain) Adrián Fuentes	5.86
