= 2012 LEB Oro Playoffs =

The 2012 LEB Oro promotion Playoffs is the final stage of the 2011–2012 LEB Oro season. It will start on 4 May 2012, and it will finish on June 8, 10 or 12 if necessary. Xxxxx All the series will be played in a best-of-5 games format. The best seeded team plays at home the games 1, 2 and 5 if necessary. The winner of the playoffs will promote to 2012–13 ACB season with Iberostar Canarias, the champion of the regular season.

== Bracket ==
Quarterfinals; May 4, 6, 11, 13, 15
2 | Ford Burgos | 94 | 68 | 68 | 77 | 74
9 | Cáceres Patrimonio de la Humanidad | 71 | 74 | 66 | 84 | 77
5 | Club Melilla Baloncesto | 53 | 80 | 61 | 66 | 71
6 | Lleida Basquetbol | 71 | 68 | 64 | 57 | 69
3 | Grupo Iruña Navarra | 73 | 79 | 72 | 78 | X
8 | UB La Palma, la Isla Bonita | 85 | 76 | 60 | 72 | X
4 | Menorca Bàsquet | 64 | 80 | 70 | 93 | X
7 | CB Breogán | 69 | 69 | 67 | 67 | X

Semifinals; May 18, 20, 25, 27, 29
9 | Cáceres Patrimonio de la Humanidad | 79 | 91 | 85 | 80 | 81
5 | Club Melilla Baloncesto | 63 | 93 | 83 | 81 | 91
3 | Grupo Iruña Navarra | 68 | 81 | 55 | X | X
4 | Menorca Bàsquet | 75 | 83 | 65 | X | X

Finals; June 1, 3, 8, 10, 12
5 | Club Melilla Baloncesto | 55 | 77 | 79 | 63 | X
4 | Menorca Bàsquet | 79 | 82 | 74 | 82 | X

== Quarterfinals ==
Quarterfinals were played on May 4, 6, 11 and if necessary 13 and 15.

=== Ford Burgos – Cáceres Patrimonio de la Humanidad ===
4 May 2011
21:00 CEST

Stats

| Ford Burgos | 94–71 | Cáceres Patrimonio de la Humanidad |
Scoring by quarter: 26–11, 24–19, 28–22, 16–19
| Pts: Toledo 17; Rebs: Phillip 9 Asts: Aguilar 6 PIR: Toledo 26 | | Pts: Olmos 15; Rebs: Antelo 8 Asts: Robles 3 PIR: Olmos 23 |

Polideportivo El Plantío, Burgos
Referees: Vázquez García, Mas Cagide

6 May 2011
19:00 CEST

Stats

| Ford Burgos | 68–74 | Cáceres Patrimonio de la Humanidad |
Scoring by quarter: 23–18, 15–20, 18–17, 12–19
| Pts: Huertas 20; Rebs: three players 6 Asts: Aguilar 5 PIR: Huertas 26 | | Pts: Sánchez 22; Rebs: Williams 7 Asts: Rodríguez 4 PIR: Sánchez 25 |

Polideportivo El Plantío, Burgos
Referees: Martínez Prada, Manuel Rodríguez

11 May 2011
21:00 CEST

Stats

| Cáceres Patrimonio de la Humanidad | 66–68 | Ford Burgos |
Scoring by quarter: 19–19, 15–14, 21–19, 16–21
| Pts: Sánchez 23; Rebs: Antelo 12; Asts: Rodríguez 4 PIR: Sánchez 26 | | Pts: Castro 19; Rebs: Ortega 11; Asts: Aguilar 6 PIR: Castro, Aguilar 17 |

Multiusos Ciudad de Cáceres, Cáceres
Referees: Morales Ruiz, Muñoz García

13 May 2011
21:00 CEST

Stats

| Cáceres Patrimonio de la Humanidad | 84–77 | Ford Burgos |
Scoring by quarter: 26–16, 17–15, 16–13, 25–33
| Pts: Rodríguez 20; Rebs: Olmos, Williams 9 Asts: Forcada 5 PIR: Rodríguez 23 | | Pts: Kedžo 18; Rebs: Tillman 6 Asts: Castro 5 PIR: Kedžo 21 |

Multiusos Ciudad de Cáceres, Cáceres
Referees: Terreros San Miguel, Pérez Bermejo

15 May 2011
21:00 CEST

Stats

| Ford Burgos | 74–77 | Cáceres Patrimonio de la Humanidad |
Scoring by quarter: 21–23, 19–19, 25–21, 9–14
| Pts: Tillman 13; Rebs: Tillman 9 Asts: Aguilar, Toledo 5 PIR: Tillman 16 | | Pts: Sánchez 20; Rebs: Antelo, Williams 10; Asts: Rodríguez 5 PIR: Antelo 19 |

Polideportivo El Plantío, Burgos
Referees: Uruñuela Uruñuela, Pazos Pazos

=== Grupo Iruña Navarra – UB La Palma, la Isla Bonita ===
4 May 2011
20:30 CEST

Stats

| Grupo Iruña Navarra | 73–85 | UB La Palma, la Isla Bonita |
Scoring by quarter: 20–21, 24–24, 12–28, 17–12
| Pts: Narros 16; Rebs: Starosta 6 Asts: Langford 5 PIR: Starosta 17 | | Pts: Arrocha 15; Rebs: López, Peña 6 Asts: Díaz 7 PIR: López, Peña 18 |

Polideportivo Anaitasuna, Pamplona
Referees: Planells Caicedo, López Córdoba

6 May 2011
12:00 CEST

Stats

| Grupo Iruña Navarra | 79–76 | UB La Palma, la Isla Bonita |
Scoring by quarter: 15–17, 23–28, 24–18, 17–13
| Pts: Narros 16; Rebs: Uriz 5 Asts: Uriz 4 PIR: Uriz 23 | | Pts: Díaz, Martínez 16; Rebs: Schaftenaar 6 Asts: Díaz 3 PIR: Díaz, Martínez 19 |

Polideportivo Anaitasuna, Pamplona
Referees: Morales Gª Alcaide, Fernández Sánchez

11 May 2011
21:00 WEST

Stats

| UB La Palma, la Isla Bonita | 60–72 | Grupo Iruña Navarra |
Scoring by quarter: 13–15, 14–13, 19–18, 14–26
| Pts: Sikma 20; Rebs: Sikma 11; Asts: López 4 PIR: Sikma 33 | | Pts: García 14; Rebs: Starosta 6 Asts: three players 2 PIR: three players 15 |

Multiusos Municipal, Santa Cruz de La Palma
Referees: Terreros San Miguel, Serrano Velázquez

13 May 2011
12:00 WEST

Stats

| UB La Palma, la Isla Bonita | 72–78 (OT) | Grupo Iruña Navarra |
Scoring by quarter: 14–20, 12–20, 16–10, 25–17, Overtime: 5–11
| Pts: Martínez 19; Rebs: Schaftenaar 11; Asts: Santana 10; PIR: Schaftenaar 25 | | Pts: Starosta 20; Rebs: Starosta 6 Asts: Sanz, Narros 3 PIR: Sanz 17 |

Multiusos Municipal, Santa Cruz de La Palma
Referees: Pla Giménez, Palomo Cañas

=== Menorca Bàsquet – CB Breogán ===
4 May 2011
21:00 CEST

Stats

| Menorca Bàsquet | 64–69 | CB Breogán |
Scoring by quarter: 17–16, 20–15, 12–20, 15–18
| Pts: Bas 19; Rebs: Arteaga 9 Asts: Pérez 4 PIR: Arteaga 20 | | Pts: Feldeine 15; Rebs: Brooks 10; Asts: De Cobos 5 PIR: Dia 14 |

Pavelló Menorca, Mahón
Referees: Sánchez Ardid, Rupérez Vielba

6 May 2011
19:00 CEST

Stats

| Menorca Bàsquet | 80–69 | CB Breogán |
Scoring by quarter: 27–12, 12–22, 20–20, 21–15
| Pts: Coppenrath 19; Rebs: Coppenrath 11; Asts: Jiménez, Navarro 4 PIR: Coppenrath 23 | | Pts: Ogirri 19; Rebs: Dia 8 Asts: De Cobos 3 PIR: Ogirri 14 |

Pavelló Menorca, Mahón

11 May 2011
20:45 CEST

Stats

| CB Breogán | 67–70 | Menorca Bàsquet |
Scoring by quarter: 20–14, 14–11, 11–25, 22–20
| Pts: Feldeine 19; Rebs: Brooks 10; Asts: Brooks, Sánchez 2 PIR: Brooks 22 | | Pts: Pérez 15; Rebs: Arteaga 9 Asts: Pérez 4 PIR: Pérez 19 |

Pazo dos Deportes, Lugo
Referees: Carpallo Miguélez, González Cuervo

13 May 2011
18:00 CEST

Stats

| CB Breogán | 67–93 | Menorca Bàsquet |
Scoring by quarter: 16–23, 14–18, 18–25, 19–27
| Pts: Feldeine 21; Rebs: Feldeine 7 Asts: Ogirri 3 PIR: Feldeine 21 | | Pts: Blanch 13; Rebs: Coppenrath 6 Asts: three players 4 PIR: Navarro 16 |

Pazo dos Deportes, Lugo
Referees: Morales Ruiz, Oyón Cauqui

=== Club Melilla Baloncesto – Lleida Basquetbol ===
4 May 2011
21:00 CEST

Stats

| Club Melilla Baloncesto | 53–71 | Lleida Basquetbol |
Scoring by quarter: 7–14, 17–22, 15–16, 14–19
| Pts: Manzano 10; Rebs: Wachsmann 9 Asts: five players 5 PIR: Manzano 12 | | Pts: Feliu 20; Rebs: Kale 10; Asts: Vázquez, Alzamora 2 PIR: Feliu 23 |

Pabellón Javier Imbroda Ortiz, Melilla
Referees: De Lucas de Lucas, Jerez Vázquez

6 May 2011
19:00 CEST

Stats

| Club Melilla Baloncesto | 80–68 | Lleida Basquetbol |
Scoring by quarter: 24–13, 11–14, 22–19, 23–22
| Pts: Arco 22; Rebs: Odiakosa, Wachsmann 8 Asts: Arco 7 PIR: Arco 29 | | Pts: Ramsdell 21; Rebs: three players 6 Asts: D'Agostino 3 PIR: Ramsdell 18 |

Pabellón Javier Imbroda Ortiz, Melilla
Referees: Morales Ruiz, López Herrada

11 May 2011
21:00 CEST

Stats

| Lleida Basquetbol | 64–61 | Club Melilla Baloncesto |
Scoring by quarter: 15–14, 12–10, 14–22, 23–15
| Pts: Feliu 18; Rebs: Feliu, Kale 8 Asts: Simeón 4 PIR: Feliu 21 | | Pts: McKeither 16; Rebs: McKeither 10; Asts: Riera, Suka-Umu 3 PIR: McKeither 21 |

Pavelló Barris Nord, Lleida
Referees: Zafra Guerra, Pazos Pazos

13 May 2011
12:30 CEST

Stats

| Lleida Basquetbol | 57–66 | Club Melilla Baloncesto |
Scoring by quarter: 15–19, 22–16, 12–15, 8–16
| Pts: Ramsdell 15; Rebs: Alzamora 9 Asts: Rubio 4 PIR: Alzamora 16 | | Pts: Arco, Odiakosa 15; Rebs: Odiakosa 9 Asts: three players 3 PIR: Odiakosa 20 |

Pavelló Barris Nord, Lleida
Referees: Uruñuela Uruñuela, Díaz Hernández

15 May 2011
21:00 CEST

Stats

| Club Melilla Baloncesto | 71–69 | Lleida Basquetbol |
Scoring by quarter: 22–18, 13–23, 12–10, 24–18
| Pts: Manzano 17; Rebs: Manzano 9 Asts: Arco 6 PIR: Manzano 20 | | Pts: Detrick 19; Rebs: Detrick 7 Asts: Feliu 3 PIR: Detrick 16 |

Pabellón Javier Imbroda Ortiz, Melilla
Referees: Garmendia Zorita, Serrano Velázquez

== Semifinals ==
=== Club Melilla Baloncesto – Cáceres Patrimonio de la Humanidad ===
18 May 2011
21:00 CEST

Stats

| Club Melilla Baloncesto | 63–79 | Cáceres Patrimonio de la Humanidad |
Scoring by quarter: 22–15, 16–25, 6–23, 19–16
| Pts: Suka-Umu 18; Rebs: Wachsmann 8 Asts: Arco, Marco 4 PIR: Suka-Umu 21 | | Pts: Williams 23; Rebs: Williams 10; Asts: Cherry, Forcada 5 PIR: Williams 30 |

Pabellón Javier Imbroda Ortiz, Melilla
Referees: Zafra Guerra, Oyón Cauqui

20 May 2011
19:00 CEST

Stats

| Club Melilla Baloncesto | 93–91 | Cáceres Patrimonio de la Humanidad |
Scoring by quarter: 15–19, 19–15, 27–24, 32–33
| Pts: Arco 24; Rebs: Wachsmann 7 Asts: Suka-Umu 8 PIR: Arco 30 | | Pts: Rodríguez 19; Rebs: Forcada 5 Asts: Cherry, Forcada 7 PIR: Rodríguez, Sánchez 17 |

Pabellón Javier Imbroda Ortiz, Melilla
Referees: Sánchez Ardid, Pazos Pazos

25 May 2011
21:00 CEST

Sats

| Cáceres Patrimonio de la Humanidad | 85–83 | Club Melilla Baloncesto |
Scoring by quarter: 23–25, 22–21, 21–14, 19–23
| Pts: Antelo 24; Rebs: Antelo 15; Asts: Forcada 6 PIR: Antelo 33 | | Pts: Suka-Umu 17; Rebs: Odiakosa 8 Asts: Marco 4 PIR: Suka-Umu 24 |

Multiusos Ciudad de Cáceres, Cáceres
Referees: Garmendia Zorita, Manuel Rodríguez

27 May 2011
19:00 CEST

Stats

| Cáceres Patrimonio de la Humanidad | 80–81 | Club Melilla Baloncesto |
Scoring by quarter: 16–26, 25–15, 19–13, 20–27
| Pts: Sánchez 26; Rebs: Williams 11; Asts: Rodríguez 6 PIR: Williams 24 | | Pts: Arco 17; Rebs: Wachsmann 9 Asts: Suka-Umu 3 PIR: Arco, Wachsmann 18 |

Multiusos Ciudad de Cáceres, Cáceres

29 May 2011
21:00 CEST

Stats

| Club Melilla Baloncesto | 91–81 | Cáceres Patrimonio de la Humanidad |
Scoring by quarter: 19–21, 15–20, 30–17, 27–23
| Pts: Odiakosa 26; Rebs: Odiakosa 11; Asts: Marco 5 PIR: Odiakosa 34 | | Pts: Rodríguez 22; Rebs: Antelo 9 Asts: Forcada 5 PIR: Antelo 20 |

Pabellón Javier Imbroda Ortiz, Melilla
Referees: Morales Ruiz, Vázquez García

=== Grupo Iruña Navarra – Menorca Bàsquet ===
18 May 2011
20:30 CEST

Stats

| Grupo Iruña Navarra | 68–75 | Menorca Bàsquet |
Scoring by quarter: 14–18, 13–22, 21–15, 20–20
| Pts: Starosta 17; Rebs: Starosta 10; Asts: Uriz 5 PIR: Starosta, Uriz 19 | | Pts: Arteaga 14; Rebs: Arteaga 9 Asts: three players 4 PIR: Arteaga 15 |

Polideportivo Anaitasuna, Pamplona
Referees: Vázquez García, Martínez Prada

20 May 2011
19:00 CEST

Stats

| Grupo Iruña Navarra | 81–83 (OT) | Menorca Bàsquet |
Scoring by quarter: 21–17, 9–18, 12–11, 21–17, Overtime: 18–20
| Pts: Narros 20; Rebs: Starosta 11; Asts: Rakočević, Sanz 3 PIR: García 12 | | Pts: Blanch 24; Rebs: Arteaga 16; Asts: Jiménez 7 PIR: Blanch 34 |

Polideportivo Anaitasuna, Pamplona
Referees: Uruñuela Uruñuela, Serrano Velázquez

24 May 2011
21:00 CEST

Stats

| Menorca Bàsquet | 65–55 | Grupo Iruña Navarra |
Scoring by quarter: 16–10, 20–12, 16–12, 13–21
| Pts: Bas 12; Rebs: Arteaga 9 Asts: Jiménez 8 PIR: Jiménez, Navarro 13 | | Pts: Uriz 14; Rebs: Starosta 10; Asts: four players 1 PIR: Uriz 24 |

Pavelló Menorca, Mahón
Referees: Morales Ruiz, Planells Caicedo

== Final ==
=== Menorca Bàsquet – Club Melilla Baloncesto ===
1 June 2011
20:45 CEST

Stats

| Menorca Bàsquet | 79–55 | Melilla Baloncesto |
Scoring by quarter: 26–15, 15–23, 26–5, 12–12
| Pts: Navarro 13; Rebs: Arteaga 9 Asts: Jiménez 4 PIR: Arteaga 14 | | Pts: Odiakosa 13; Rebs: Odiakosa 8 Asts: five players 1 PIR: Odiakosa 12 |

Pavelló Menorca, Mahón
Referees: Oyón Cauqui, Serrano Velázquez

3 June 2011
18:00 CEST

Stats

| Menorca Bàsquet | 82–77 | Melilla Baloncesto |
Scoring by quarter: 23–17, 17–21, 19–26, 23–13
| Pts: Jiménez 16; Rebs: three players 5 Asts: Pérez 4 PIR: Arteaga 19 | | Pts: Arco 22; Rebs: Manzano 6 Asts: four players 4 PIR: Arco 23 |

Pavelló Menorca, Mahón
Referees: Vázquez García, Fernández Sánchez

7 June 2011
21:00 CEST

Stats

| Club Melilla Baloncesto | 79–74 | Menorca Bàsquet |
Scoring by quarter: 26–12, 17–12, 13–19, 23–31
| Pts: Arco 36; Rebs: Manzano 9 Asts: Suka-Umu 4 PIR: Arco 39 | | Pts: Blanch 22; Rebs: Coppenrath 9 Asts: Jiménez 3 PIR: Coppenrath 17 |

Pabellón Javier Imbroda, Melilla
Referees: De Lucas de Lucas, Manuel Rodríguez

9 June 2011
18:00 CEST

Stats

| Club Melilla Baloncesto | 63–82 | Menorca Bàsquet |
Scoring by quarter: 17–17, 12–22, 16–25, 18–18
| Pts: Suka-Umu 18; Rebs: Wachsmann 7 Asts: Suka-Umu 5 PIR: Suka-Umu 29 | | Pts: Coppenrath 15; Rebs: Coppenrath, Morentin 6 Asts: Pérez, Otegui 4 PIR: Coppenrath, Otegui 20 |
Menorca Bàsquet promotes to ACB with Iberostar Canarias

Pabellón Javier Imbroda, Melilla
Referees: Morales Ruiz, Planells Caicedo
