= 2011–12 LEB Oro season =

- League: LEB Oro
- Sport: Basketball
- Games: 306 (regular season)
- Teams: 18
- TV partner: FEB TV

Regular Season
- Season champions: Iberostar Canarias
- Season MVP: (United States) Jakim Donaldson
- Top scorer: (United States) Troy DeVries

Playoffs
- Playoffs champions: Menorca Bàsquet
- Playoffs runners-up: Club Melilla Baloncesto

Copa Príncipe
- Champions: Iberostar Canarias
- Runners-up: Ford Burgos
- Finals MVP: (Spain) Nacho Yáñez

LEB Oro seasons
- 2010–11 2012–13

The 2011–12 LEB Oro season is the 16th season of the Liga Española de Baloncesto. It's named too Adecco Oro by sponsorship reasons. The 306-game regular season (34 games for each of the 18 teams) will begin on Friday, September 23, 2010, and will end on Friday, April 27, 2011. The champion of the regular season will be promoted to Liga ACB. The teams between 2nd and 9th position will play a best of 5 games play off, where the winner will be promoted too to the higher division. The teams 16th and 17th will play a best of 5 games play-out where the loser will be relegated to LEB Plata, with the 18th team.

== Competition format ==
=== Eligibility of players ===
All teams must have in their roster:

- A minimum of six players who played in Spain during three season being between 15 and 20 years old.
- A maximum of two non-EU players. This players can be replaced by players from the EU or ACP countries.
- A maximum of three players from the EU or ACP countries.

Teams can not sign any player after February 29, 2012.

=== Regular season ===
Each team of every division has to play with all the other teams of its division twice, once at home and the other at the opponent's stadium. This means that in Liga LEB the league ends after every team plays 34 games. The first round will be played on September 23, 2011 and the last one on April 27, 2012.

Like many other leagues in continental Europe, the Liga LEB takes a winter break once each team has played half its schedule. One feature of the league that may be unusual to North American observers is that the two halves of the season are played in the same order—that is, the order of each team's first-half fixtures is repeated in the second half of the season, with the only difference being the arenas used. This procedure is typical in Europe; it is also used by La Liga in football.

Since the 18th round, if two or more teams have accumulated the same number of winning games, the criteria of tie-breaking are these:

1. Head-to-head winning games.
2. Head-to-head points coefficient.
3. Total points coefficient.

After the first half of the season (17th round), the two top qualified teams will play the Copa Príncipe de Asturias and the leader will be the host team. This game will be on February 1, 2012.

At the final of the season:

- The regular season winner promotes directly to Liga ACB.
- Teams qualified between 2nd and 9th, will join the promotion play-offs to ACB.
- Teams qualified in 16th and 17th will play a relegation play-out to LEB Plata.
- Team qualified in 18th position is relegated directly to LEB Plata.

== Team information ==
CB Granada and Menorca Bàsquet were directly relegated from ACB after finishing in the bottom two places and they will substitute CB Murcia (champion) and Blu:sens Monbús.

Aguas de Sousas Ourense and Fundación Adepal Alcázar, who lost the relegation playoffs against Palencia Baloncesto, left the league after finishing in 17th and 18th position. Knet Rioja as champion of LEB Plata and Iberostar Bàsquet Mallorca as LEB Plata playoffs winner will enjoy the league.

On August 1, and when the registration date expired days ago, CB Tarragona announced would resign to their berth in LEB Oro and would try to join the group C of Liga EBA, but finally the Catalan team will compete at this league.

All rosters for the start of the season at FEB.es

Team	City	Arena	Capacity	Founded	Head coach
Baloncesto León	León	Palacio de los Deportes de León	5,300	1981	(Spain) Javier de Grado
Cáceres Patrimonio de la Humanidad	Cáceres	Multiusos Ciudad de Cáceres	6,500	2007	(Spain) Gustavo Aranzana
CB Breogán	Lugo	Pazo Provincial Dos Deportes	6,500	1966	(Spain) Pepe Rodríguez
CB Granada	Granada	Palacio Municipal de Deportes	7,500	1994	(Spain) Miguel Ángel Zapata
Clínicas Rincón Benahavís	Benahavís	Pabellón Maestro Salvador Sánchez	1,500	1988	(Spain) Manolo Povea
Ford Burgos	Burgos	Polideportivo El Plantío	3,150	1997	(Spain) Andreu Casadevall
Girona FC	Girona	Palau Girona-Fontajau	5,500	1962	(Croatia) Žan Tabak
Grupo Iruña Navarra	Pamplona	Polideportivo Anaitasuna	3,000	2006	(Spain) Ángel Jareño
Iberostar Canarias	San Cristóbal de La Laguna	Pabellón Insular Santiago Martín	5,100	1991	(Spain) Alejandro Martínez
Knet & Éniac	Logroño	Palacio de los Deportes	3,851	1967	(Spain) Jesús Sala
Lleida Basquetbol	Lleida	Pavelló Barris Nord	6,100	1997	(Spain) Ricard Casas
Lobe Huesca	Huesca	Palacio Municipal de Huesca	5,018	1977	(Spain) Quim Costa
Logitravel Mallorca Básquet	Inca	Pavelló Municipal d'Esports	3,000	2008	(Spain) Xavi Sastre
Club Melilla Baloncesto	Melilla	Pabellón Javier Imbroda Ortiz	3,800	1991	(Spain) Gonzalo García
Menorca Bàsquet	Mahón	Pabellón Menorca	5,115	1950	(Spain) Josep Maria Berrocal
Palencia Baloncesto	Palencia	Pabellón Marta Domínguez	1,806	1979	(Spain) Natxo Lezkano
Tarragona Bàsquet 2017	Tarragona	Pavelló El Serrallo	1,800	1978	(Spain) Berni Álvarez
UB La Palma, la Isla Bonita	Santa Cruz de La Palma	Multiusos de Santa Cruz de La Palma	4,000	1978	(Spain) Carlos Frade

== Managerial changes ==
=== Before the start of the season ===
Team	Outgoing manager	Manner of departure	Replaced by	Date of appointment
Menorca Bàsquet	(Spain) Paco Olmos	Resigned	(Spain) Josep Maria Berrocal	June 22, 2011
Girona FC	(Spain) Ricard Casas	End of contract	(Croatia) Žan Tabak	July 5, 2011
Clínicas Rincón Benahavís	(Spain) Paco Alonso	Signed for Unicaja structure	(Spain) Manolo Povea	August 8, 2011
Lleida Basquetbol	(Spain) Josep Maria Raventós	End of contract	(Spain) Ricard Casas	August 8, 2011

=== During the season ===
Team	Outgoing manager	Manner of departure	Date of vacancy	Replaced by	Date of appointment	Position in table
CB Granada	(Spain) Curro Segura	Sacked	15 February 2012	(Spain) Miguel Ángel Zapata	6 February 2012	17th (6–15)
CB Peñas Huesca	(Spain) Ángel Navarro	Sacked	13 March 2012	(Spain) Quim Costa	14 March 2012	16th (9–18)

== Regular season ==
=== League table ===
#	Teams	P	W	L	PF	PA	PT	Qualification or relegation
1	Iberostar Canarias (C)	34	26	8	2993	2596	60	Promotion to ACB
2	Ford Burgos	34	22	12	2690	2359	56	Promotion playoffs
3	Grupo Iruña Navarra	34	21	13	2689	2596	55	Promotion playoffs
4	Menorca Bàsquet	34	21	13	2602	2442	55	Promotion playoffs
5	Club Melilla Baloncesto	34	20	14	2730	2677	54	Promotion playoffs
6	Lleida Basquetbol	34	20	14	2518	2510	54	Promotion playoffs
7	CB Breogán	34	19	15	2658	2577	53	Promotion playoffs
8	UB La Palma, la Isla Bonita	34	19	15	2558	2546	53	Promotion playoffs
9	Cáceres Patrimonio de la Humanidad	34	18	16	2719	2679	52	Promotion playoffs
10	Knet & Éniac	34	18	16	2708	2709	52	
11	Palencia Baloncesto	34	18	16	2705	2651	52	
12	Girona FC	34	16	18	2549	2620	50	
13	Logitravel Mallorca Bàsquet	34	15	19	2768	2822	49	
14	Baloncesto León	34	15	19	2671	2711	49	
15	Lobe Huesca	34	13	21	2622	2663	47	
16	Tarragona Bàsquet 2017	34	11	23	2490	2662	45	Relegation playoffs
17	Clínicas Rincón Benahavís	34	7	27	2124	2495	41	Relegation playoffs
18	CB Granada	34	7	27	2415	2714	41	Relegation to LEB Plata

Source: FEB
(C) = Copa Príncipe de Asturias champion

=== Positions by round ===
Team\Round																																		
	01	02	03	04	05	06	07	08	09	10	11	12	13	14	15	16	17	18	19	20	21	22	23	24	25	26	27	28	29	30	31	32	33	34
Iberostar Canarias	12	6	2	2	2	2	1	1	1	1	1	1	1	1	1	1	1	1	1	1	1	1	1	1	1	1	1	1	1	1	1	1	1	1
Ford Burgos	2	7	3	3	3	3	2	3	3	4	3	3	3	2	2	2	2	2	2	3	4	4	7	5	7	6	5	5	4	3	2	2	2	2
Grupo Iruña Navarra	7	12	14	17	12	13	13	16	15	12	10	10	7	5	7	7	6	7	4	7	7	7	6	4	6	5	6	6	6	6	6	4	5	3
Menorca Bàsquet	10	5	12	6	9	6	8	8	6	5	7	4	4	4	4	3	4	4	5	2	2	2	3	2	2	2	2	3	2	2	3	5	3	4
Club Melilla Baloncesto	4	8	5	11	8	5	5	7	5	8	5	7	5	7	6	5	5	5	6	5	5	6	5	6	4	7	7	7	7	7	7	7	7	5
Lleida Basquetbol	6	3	1	1	1	1	4	2	2	2	2	2	2	3	3	6	7	6	7	6	6	5	4	7	5	4	4	4	5	5	5	3	4	6
CB Breogán	9	14	11	12	6	9	6	5	7	6	6	8	9	12	9	8	9	11	15	15	14	14	13	13	13	11	10	8	8	8	8	8	8	7
UB La Palma, la Isla Bonita	8	4	10	4	4	4	3	4	4	3	4	5	8	6	5	4	3	3	3	4	3	3	2	3	3	3	3	2	3	4	4	6	6	8
Cáceres Patrimonio de la Humanidad	16	10	9	9	13	16	16	14	13	16	13	12	13	11	12	10	12	8	9	12	10	12	11	12	12	12	11	12	11	12	10	10	10	9
Knet & Éniac	1	1	4	7	11	12	10	10	14	17	17	14	14	15	16	15	14	15	14	11	13	11	12	11	9	9	8	9	9	9	9	9	9	10
Palencia Baloncesto	15	13	15	10	14	8	7	6	8	7	8	6	6	8	10	11	10	13	13	10	11	10	10	10	11	8	12	10	10	10	11	11	11	11
Girona FC	3	2	7	8	5	7	11	12	11	13	11	13	11	9	8	9	8	9	8	8	8	8	8	8	8	10	9	11	12	11	12	12	12	12
Logitravel Mallorca Básquet	14	9	8	13	15	17	17	15	12	15	12	11	12	10	11	13	11	10	10	13	12	13	14	14	14	14	13	13	13	14	13	14	14	13
Baloncesto León	18	17	17	15	10	11	9	9	9	9	9	9	10	13	13	12	13	12	11	9	9	9	9	9	10	13	14	14	14	13	14	13	13	14
Lobe Huesca	13	16	16	16	17	15	15	17	16	11	14	17	15	16	14	14	15	14	12	14	16	16	16	16	16	16	16	16	16	16	16	15	15	15
Tarragona Bàsquet 2017	11	15	13	14	16	14	14	13	17	14	16	15	16	14	15	16	16	16	16	16	15	15	15	15	15	15	15	15	15	15	15	16	16	16
Clínicas Rincón Benahavís	17	18	18	18	18	18	18	18	18	18	18	18	18	18	18	18	18	18	18	18	18	18	18	18	18	18	18	18	18	18	18	18	18	17
CB Granada	5	11	6	5	7	10	12	11	10	10	15	16	17	17	17	17	17	17	17	17	17	17	17	17	17	17	17	17	17	17	17	17	17	18

Source: FEB

=== Results ===
	León	Cáceres	Breogán	Granada	Clínicas	Melilla	Burgos	Girona	Navarra	Canarias	Knet	Lleida	Huesca	Mallorca	Menorca	Palencia	Tarrag	LaPalma
Baloncesto León		95–90	70–76	77–59	65–76	91–70	75–71	82–88	89–94	74–82	80–72	74–76	86–82	95–100	94–79	88–87	69–77	80–79
Cáceres Patrimonio de la Humanidad	83–78		78–64	78–75	74–81	85–72	68–77	93–75	75–84	80–97	85–86	88–86	71–64	102–82	80–72	93–76	71–59	90–78
CB Breogán	74–94	79–81		64–63	82–73	71–67	80–71	69–64	78–71	82–93	84–88	81–61	86–75	80–75	87–86	76–66	93–63	74–67
CB Granada	74–76	96–92	63–80		60–70	73–75	65–73	50–68	80–67	90–89	76–85	57–71	64–84	103–94	57–78	56–90	79–69	58–65
Clínicas Rincón Benahavís	76–81	62–67	45–72	71–61		67–64	63–78	58–69	67–68	47–99	59–82	57–69	83–63	67–71	46–64	72–62	63–69	58–67
Club Melilla Baloncesto	78–83	85–83	99–94	78–71	80–69		88–84	98–70	95–78	77–63	107–90	86–80	88–78	89–78	72–78	94–79	77–74	72–70
Ford Burgos	75–73	85–75	86–73	89–76	78–55	93–91		83–78	67–64	81–76	68–75	88–53	93–90	83–87	64–65	73–62	90–62	97–85
Girona FC	81–77	87–72	84–78	59–73	75–59	78–76	81–77		67–69	83–88	85–90	81–85	73–65	88–83	72–62	101–95	88–86	66–75
Grupo Iruña Navarra	72–60	84–76	93–103	104–90	75–53	83–75	69–67	90–82		85–82	80–81	68–74	88–74	87–82	89–79	83–88	85–75	88–82
Iberostar Canarias	103–76	80–71	89–73	88–77	75–64	91–70	90–69	80–69	55–67		81–83	91–77	92–55	107–79	83–77	88–83	74–67	107–76
Knet & Éniac	93–73	76–94	79–86	86–67	78–66	80–76	76–90	77–67	65–79	86–104		76–74	98–101	76–80	67–78	96–82	81–68	58–70
Lleida Basquetbol	89–80	69–65	67–65	71–52	79–55	58–61	90–76	89–70	74–72	70–104	63–69		90–82	88–81	84–75	85–92	75–70	58–54
Lobe Huesca	68–81	71–66	84–80	112–56	86–54	76–84	67–91	74–61	70–74	92–89	71–76	67–71		75–78	68–65	91–82	84–77	71–49
Logitravel Mallorca	78–70	83–88	80–75	75–81	79–63	86–88	85–71	73–81	80–77	85–92	91–79	67–72	87–83		100–91	86–96	81–67	74–76
Menorca Bàsquet	74–65	84–61	74–73	81–79	80–37	85–81	68–72	71–57	72–82	62–72	89–87	75–56	75–76	84–80		83–74	89–61	75–65
Palencia Baloncesto	78–61	80–76	72–65	86–80	77–64	66–69	79–87	80–65	89–81	92–84	80–71	73–71	78–74	83–73	67–71		87–66	64–67
Tarragona Bàsquet 2017	74–83	79–82	78–87	84–79	68–60	78–68	73–78	76–65	69–66	98–111	83–75	72–71	95–70	69–73	65–89	80–76		70–71
UB La Palma, la Isla Bonita	82–76	78–85	78–74	85–76	79–64	93–80	82–65	67–71	81–73	79–94	72–70	86–72	82–79	96–82	69–72	81–84	72–69	

Source: FEB

== Copa Príncipe de Asturias ==
At the half of the league, the two first teams in the table play the Copa Príncipe de Asturias at home of the winner of the first half season (17th round). If this team doesn't want to host the Copa Príncipe, the second qualified can do it. If nobody wants to host it, the Federation will propose a neutral venue.

The Champion of this Cup will play the play-offs as first qualified if it finishes the league between the 2nd and the 5th qualified. The Copa Príncipe will be played on January 31, 2012.

=== Teams qualified ===
#	Teams	P	W	L	PF	PA	PT
1	Iberostar Canarias	17	14	3	1565	1274	31
2	Ford Burgos	17	12	5	1365	1264	29

=== The game ===
Teledeporte
CyLTV 8

31 Jan 2012
21:00 WET

Report
Stats

Iberostar Canarias	93–85	Ford Burgos
Scoring by quarter: 27–20, 20–14, 19–24, 27–27
Pts: Nacho Yáñez, 17; Rebs: Jakim Donaldson, 8 Asts: Albert Sàbat, 5 PIR: Jakim Donaldson, 18		Pts: Darren Phillip, 27; Rebs: Darren Phillip, 10; Asts: Juan Alberto Aguilar and Chus Castro, 5 PIR: Darren Phillip, 28
Iberostar Canarias, champion of the XXI Copa Príncipe de Asturias

Santiago Martín, La Laguna
Attendance: 4,000
Referees: Uruñuela Uruñuela, Fernández Sánchez, Oyón Cauqui

== Playoffs ==
=== Promotion playoffs ===
Quarterfinals; May 4, 6, 11, 13, 15
2	Ford Burgos	94	68	68	77	74
9	Cáceres Patrimonio de la Humanidad	71	74	66	84	77
5	Club Melilla Baloncesto	53	80	61	66	71
6	Lleida Basquetbol	71	68	64	57	69
3	Grupo Iruña Navarra	73	79	72	78	X
8	UB La Palma, la Isla Bonita	85	76	60	72	X
4	Menorca Bàsquet	64	80	70	93	X
7	CB Breogán	69	69	67	67	X

Semifinals; May 18, 20, 25, 27, 29
9	Cáceres Patrimonio de la Humanidad	79	91	85	80	81
5	Club Melilla Baloncesto	63	93	83	81	91
3	Grupo Iruña Navarra	68	81	55	X	X
4	Menorca Bàsquet	75	83	65	X	X

Finals; June 1, 3, 8, 10, 12
5	Club Melilla Baloncesto	55	77	79	63	X
4	Menorca Bàsquet	79	82	74	82	X

=== Relegation playoffs ===
The loser of a best-of-five series will be relegated to LEB Plata.

Relegation playoffs May 4, 6, 11, 13, 15
16	Tarragona Bàsquet 2017	82	90	77
17	Clínicas Rincón Benahavís	69	72	68

== Stats leaders in regular season ==
Players must play at least 17 games to appear in the rankings

=== Points ===
Rk	Name	Team	Games	Points	PPG
1	(United States) Troy DeVries	Club Melilla Baloncesto	27	517	19.1
2	(United States) Matt Witt	Knet & Éniac	33	602	18.2
3	(Dominican Republic) James Feldeine	CB Breogán	34	609	17.9
4	(Dominican Republic) Manny Quezada	Baloncesto León	33	545	16.5
5	(Puerto Rico) Alex Franklin	Lobe Huesca	19	308	16.2

=== Rebounds ===
Rk	Name	Team	Games	Rebounds	RPG
1	(Nigeria) Olaseni Lawal	Knet & Éniac	34	361	10.6
2	(Senegal) Michel Diouf	Palencia Baloncesto	19	168	8.8
3	(United States) Jakim Donaldson	Iberostar Canarias	34	298	8.7
4	(Bosnia and Herzegovina) Ognjen Kuzmić	Clínicas Rincón Benahavís	34	291	8.5
5	(Czech Republic) Ondřej Starosta	Grupo Iruña Navarra	34	285	8.3

=== Assists ===
Rk	Name	Team	Games	Assists	APG
1	(Spain) Carles Bivià	Logitravel Mallorca Bàsquet	34	174	5.1
2	(United States) Matt Witt	Knet & Éniac	33	150	4.5
3	(United States) Marcus Norris	Lleida Basquetbol	24	103	4.2
4	(Spain) Dani López	Ford Burgos	30	121	4.0
5	(Spain) Dani Pérez	Menorca Bàsquet	34	128	3.7

=== Performance Index Rating ===
Rk	Name	Team	Games	Rating	PIR
1	(United States) Jakim Donaldson	Iberostar Canarias	34	724	21.2
2	(United States) Troy DeVries	Club Melilla Baloncesto	27	495	18.3
3	(Nigeria) Olaseni Lawal	Knet & Éniac	34	623	18.3
4	(Spain) José Ángel Antelo	Cáceres Patrimonio de la Humanidad	34	619	18.2
5	(Spain) Óliver Arteaga	Menorca Bàsquet	30	531	17.7

== Awards ==
=== MVP week by week ===
Day	Name	Team	PIR
1	(Dominican Republic) James Feldeine	CB Breogán	32
2	(Spain) José Ángel Antelo	Cáceres Patrimonio de la Humanidad	32
3	(United States) Leon Williams	Cáceres Patrimonio de la Humanidad (2)	41
4	(Spain) Álex Abrines	Clínicas Rincón Benahavís	35
5	(Spain) Ricardo Guillén	Iberostar Canarias	31
6	(United Kingdom) Darren Phillip	Ford Burgos	36
7	(Dominican Republic) Manny Quezada	Baloncesto León	39
8	(Spain) Ricardo Guillén (2)	Iberostar Canarias (2)	42
9	(United States) Jakim Donaldson	Iberostar Canarias (3)	46
10	(Dominican Republic) James Feldeine (2)	CB Breogán (2)	28
11	(United Kingdom) Darren Phillip (2)	Ford Burgos (2)	32
12	(United States) Kevin Langford	Grupo Iruña Navarra	36
13	(Spain) Juan Francisco Riera	Club Melilla Baloncesto	37
14	(Spain) José Ángel Antelo (2)	Cáceres Patrimonio de la Humanidad (3)	34
15	(United States) Troy DeVries	Club Melilla Baloncesto (2)	33
16	(Spain) Salva Arco	Club Melilla Baloncesto (3)	34
17	(Cape Verde) Jeff Xavier	Palencia Baloncesto	33
18	(Spain) Manu Coego	CB Granada	46
19	(Nigeria) Olaseni Lawal	Knet & Éniac	36
20	(Nigeria) Olaseni Lawal (2)	Knet & Éniac (2)	33
21	(Brazil) Marcus Vinicius	Ford Burgos (3)	29
22	(United States) Ross Schraeder	Ford Burgos (4)	30
23	(Spain) Óliver Arteaga	Menorca Bàsquet	35
24	(Puerto Rico) Alex Franklin	Lobe Huesca	34
25	(Spain) Carles Bivià	Logitravel Básquet Mallorca	39
26	(Spain) José Ángel Antelo (3)	Cáceres Patrimonio de la Humanidad (4)	30
27	(Spain) Carles Bivià (2)	Logitravel Básquet Mallorca (2)	32
28	(United States) Ridge McKeither	Club Melilla Baloncesto (4)	31
28	(United States) Darryl Middleton	Girona FC	31
29	(Spain) Salva Arco (2)	Club Melilla Baloncesto (5)	34
30	(Lithuania) Gintaras Leonavičius	Lobe Huesca (2)	36
31	(Spain) Manu Coego (2)	CB Granada (2)	31
31	(Czech Republic) Ondřej Starosta	Grupo Iruña Navarra (2)	31
32	(Spain) Urko Otegui	Menorca Bàsquet (2)	33
33	(Bosnia and Herzegovina) Ognjen Kuzmić	Clínicas Rincón Benahavís (2)	38
34	(Spain) José Ángel Antelo (4)	Cáceres Patrimonio de la Humanidad (5)	33

==== Playoffs ====
Day	Name	Team	PIR
QF1	(Brazil) Marcus Vinicius (2)	Ford Burgos (5)	26
QF2	(Spain) Salva Arco (3)	Club Melilla Baloncesto (6)	29
QF3	(United States) Luke Sikma	UB La Palma, la Isla Bonita	33
QF4	(Netherlands) Roeland Schaftenaar	UB La Palma, la Isla Bonita (2)	25
QF5	(Spain) Héctor Manzano	Club Melilla Baloncesto (7)	20
SF1	(United States) Leon Williams (2)	Cáceres Patrimonio de la Humanidad (6)	30
SF2	(Spain) Marc Blanch	Menorca Bàsquet (3)	34
SF3	(Spain) José Ángel Antelo (5)	Cáceres Patrimonio de la Humanidad (7)	33
SF4	(United States) Leon Williams (3)	Cáceres Patrimonio de la Humanidad (8)	24
SF5	(Nigeria) Dinma Odiakosa	Club Melilla Baloncesto (8)	34
F1	(Spain) Óliver Arteaga (2)	Menorca Bàsquet (4)	21
F2	(Spain) Salva Arco (4)	Club Melilla Baloncesto (9)	23
F3	(Spain) Salva Arco (5)	Club Melilla Baloncesto (10)	39
F4	(Spain) Marcos Suka-Umu	Club Melilla Baloncesto (11)	29
