= CB Granada =

Basketball team in Andalusia, Spain

- Leagues: LEB Oro
- Founded: 1994
- Dissolved: May, 2012
- History: C.A.B. Granada (1994–1996); CB Granada (1996–2012)
- Arena: Palacio de los Deportes de Granada
- Location: Granada, Andalusia
- Team colors: Dark Red, Hunter Green
- President: Ramiro Pérez de la Blanca
- Head coach: Miguel Ángel Zapata
- Championships: 1 Liga EBA championship
- Website: cbgranada.com
| Home | Away |

Club Baloncesto Granada, S.A.D. was a professional basketball team based in Granada, Andalusia. The team was founded in 1994 and has had notable players during its history, including Curtis Borchardt, Darvin Ham, Jerod Ward, Giorgos Sigalas, Scott Padgett, Pops Mensah-Bonsu, Richard Hendrix, and Joe Ingles.

== Team history ==
=== The origins ===
The current club has its origins in the old Club Asociación Baloncesto Granada, which in turn was the continuation of the Club de Amigos del Baloncesto de Loja, who covered during some time the vacuum left by the late CD Oximesa. On June 28, 1994, the lawyer José Luis Lopez Cantal formed, with the company of a board, the Club Asociación Baloncesto Granada, which campaigned for a year on the newly created Liga Española de Baloncesto Amateur (Liga EBA). The team did not achieve the desired rise in its first season, but in the 1995-96 season, after an exceptional competition, it was proclaimed champion in the final eight disputed in Lugo. Although during that year it had been agreed that there would be no promotions, the CB Granada, in a joint operation with the city, bought the spot of Baloncesto Salamanca (agreement closed on June 14 by 400 million pesetas plus VAT), which allow for first time play in the ACB, which demanded their transformation into joint stock company sports. Thus, the club became Club Baloncesto Granada SAD.

=== The arrival in the elite ===
In their first incursion into the elite (96-97), with José Alberto Pesquera as coach, 'Cebé' also disputed the Korać Cup (a right acquired with the purchase of Salamanca), in which they reached the sweet sixteen: eliminated by the Banco di Roma (88-70 at the Palacio de los Deportes and 94-65 at the Palasport). In the domestic competition, they finished in thirteenth place.

The next season (1997–98) began with Pedro Martínez as a coach, but the results were not accompanied and he ended up being replaced by Antonio Gomez Nieto before the start of play off for the relegation. In the final series before the Ciudad de Huelva, the excitement would persist until the last meeting, which was held in the Palacio de los Deportes, where John Williams score a 'coast to coast' winning basket. The chairman and was then Carlos Marsá, which had acquired almost all the shares of the entity.

For the new financial year (1998–99) the club hired Miguel Angel Martin, although he ended up resigning because of his disagreements with the president and the administration of the club. The team was plunged into a desperate situation. The coordinator of the quarry, David Cardenas, went to the bench, while his record of 0 wins and 6 defeats forced them to seek, in desperation, a coach with experience: Iñaki Iriarte. However, the team did not lift its head and fell, along with Murcia, to the LEB.

=== Climb on the court ===
Subsequently, the CB Granada tried to nurture players to the top level, but the season (1999–2000) did not end in their favor: Iriarte presented his resignation due to personal problems, which caused the interim Enrique Gutierrez and the subsequent hiring of José Alberto Pesquera, nor would finish its work (dismissal after a pitiful defeat in Córdoba, against Cajasur). So, the leaders opted again by Antonio Gomez Nieto to reach port as dignified as possible: eliminated in the elite eight by the CB Murcia.

For the attempt to climb back (2000–01), it appeared that Gomez Nieto (coach) and Gutierrez (sports director) had succeeded in forming a template of guarantees (the first regional title in the history of the club, the Andalusian League, defeating Caja San Fernando in the semifinals and Unicaja in the final), but economic problems crossed their path. The survivors, in a display of effort, confidence and unity, qualified for the playoffs as the fourth-place finisher. They beat Inca and faced Menorca in the semifinals, which had beaten the big favorite (León), with the stadium factor favouring the Andalusians. In another dramatic final, the team was promoted.

Gomez Nieto remained as coach in the return and, with a staff of some level and right mix of youth and vets, materialized stay (since the fourteenth), with victories at FC Barcelona, Pamesa Valencia, Caja San Fernando or Real Madrid and the individual records of Nacho Ordín (98.2% shooting, with a series of 53/54) and Oriol Junyent (Spanish first in the history of averaging double figures in rebounds: 10.5) for the memory.

Unfortunately, that was the only change in a few months. In the 2002-03 campaign, the team was not as effective as in the past and various changes in the team destabilized it further. The coach stepped down and Sergio Valdeolmillos replaced him, leading to a visible improvement in play and attitude. The team got their first victory against Adecco Estudiantes, but couldn't avoid relegation.

The new challenge in the LEB was with Sergio Valdeolmillos as coach and Oriol Humet in the office. Despite a track record with some ups and downs, they reached the playoffs defeating UB La Palma and going onto win against Zaragoza in a tiebreaker match.

=== 2004–2011: The consolidation in ACB ===
The new era in ACB, starts with the definition of a medium-term project that will lead the club to settle permanently in the national basketball elite. Since then, prominent players have been part of this project of consolidation with one in particular: Curtis Borchardt.

But on 2010–11 season, the huge debts and a poor planning of the team led to the relegation of CB Granada to the relegation to LEB Oro after seven years at Liga ACB.

=== Comeback to LEB and dissolution ===
After the 2011 relegation, CB Granada played on LEB Oro with several economic problems, and despite a good start, the lack of budget caused the march of several players and several losses. In December 2011, the Board of the club announced CB Granada will be dissolved after the end of the season.

CB Granada finished the 2011-12 league in the last position and was relegated to LEB Plata after being defeated in the last game by Clínicas Rincón Benahavís 71–61. Days later, the club officially required the stoppage. Finally, on May 5, the club was officially dissolved.

Despite the dissolution of the team, the Fundación CB Granada, which previously worked with CB Granada, started to play in Regional leagues.

== Sponsorship naming ==
CB Granada had several denominations through the years due to its sponsorship:

- SPAR Granada: 1994–96
- Covirán Sierra Nevada: 1996–98
- Covirán Cervezas Alhambra: 1998–99

== Coaches ==
- Antonio Gómez Nieto 1994–1996, 1998, 2000–2003
- José Alberto Pesquera 1996–1997, 2000
- Pedro Martínez 1997–1998
- Miguel Ángel Martín 1998–1999
- David Cárdenas 1999
- Iñaki Irirarte 1999–2000
- Kike Gutiérrez 2000
- Sergio Valdeolmillos 2003–2008
- Trifón Poch 2008–2011
- Curro Segura 2011–12
- Miguel Ángel Zapata 2012

== Season by season ==
| Season | Tier | Division | Pos. | W–L | Cup competitions | | European competitions | | |
|---|---|---|---|---|---|---|---|---|---|
| 1994–95 | 2 | Liga EBA | 3rd | 23–13 | | | | | |
| 1995–96 | 2 | Liga EBA | 1st (Note: Bought the ACB and the Korać Cup places to CB Salamanca.) | 26–04 | | | | | |
| 1996–97 | 1 | Liga ACB | 13th | 14–20 | | | 3 Korać Cup | R32 | 5–3 |
| 1997–98 | 1 | Liga ACB | 16th | 14–25 | | | | | |
| 1998–99 | 1 | Liga ACB | 17th | 8–26 | | | | | |
| 1999–00 | 2 | LEB | 10th | 16–19 | Copa Príncipe | QF | | | |
| 2000–01 | 2 | LEB | 2nd | 26–16 | | | | | |
| 2001–02 | 1 | Liga ACB | 14th | 12–22 | | | | | |
| 2002–03 | 1 | Liga ACB | 18th | 5–29 | | | | | |
| 2003–04 | 2 | LEB | 2nd | 27–17 | | | | | |
| 2004–05 | 1 | Liga ACB | 15th | 12–22 | | | | | |
| 2005–06 | 1 | Liga ACB | 13th | 14–20 | Supercopa | RU | | | |
| 2006–07 | 1 | Liga ACB | 11th | 15–19 | | | | | |
| 2007–08 | 1 | Liga ACB | 15th | 12–22 | | | | | |
| 2008–09 | 1 | Liga ACB | 11th | 12–20 | | | | | |
| 2009–10 | 1 | Liga ACB | 10th | 15–19 | | | | | |
| 2010–11 | 1 | Liga ACB | 17th | 7–27 | | | | | |
| 2011–12 | 2 | LEB Oro | 18th | 7–27 | | | | | |

== Accomplishments and awards ==
=== Honours ===
- 2nd division championships: (1)
  - Liga EBA: (1) 1996
- Supercopa: (0)
  - runner-up 2005
- Andalusia Cup: (3)
  - 2000, 2004, 2006

=== Individual awards ===
ACB Rising Star

- Richard Hendrix – 2010

ACB Slam Dunk Champion

- Jerod Ward – 2003
