= Nicolás Richotti =

Argentine basketball player (born 1986)

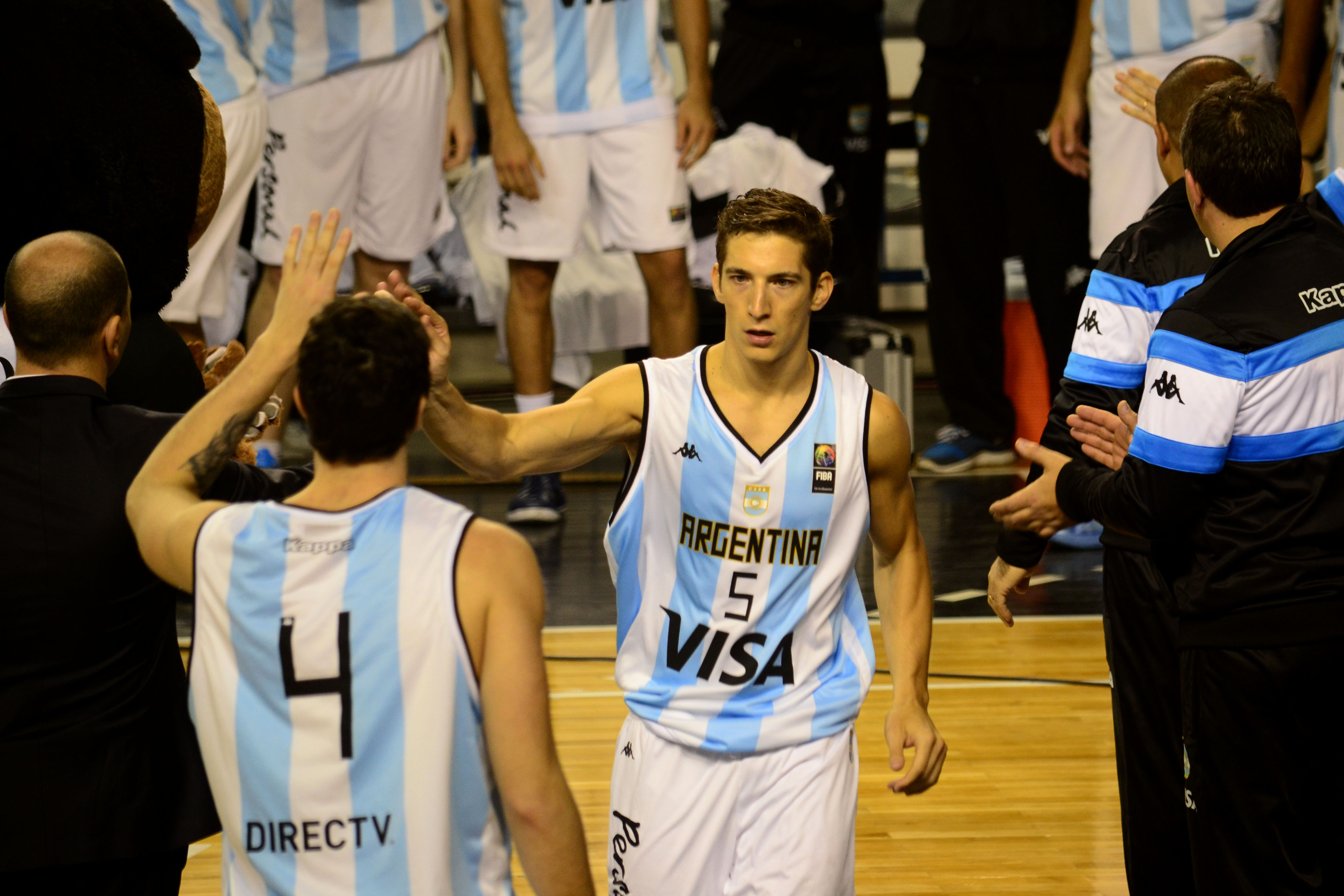
- Richotti with Argentina in 2015

Personal information
- Born: October 17, 1986 (age 40) Bahía Blanca, Argentina
- Listed height: 184 cm (6 ft 0 in)
- Listed weight: 82 kg (181 lb)

Career information
- Playing career: 2004–2023
- Position: Point guard / shooting guard

Career history
- 2004–2005: Hindú Resistencia
- 2005–2006: Bari
- 2006–2007: BCC Agropoli
- 2007–2008: Rovigo
- 2008–2009: San Isidro
- 2009–2010: Real Madrid B
- 2010–2019: Canarias
- 2019–2020: Fuenlabrada
- 2020–2021: Destino Palencia
- 2021–2023: Njarðvík

Career highlights
- FIBA Champions League champion (2017); FIBA Intercontinental Cup champion (2017); Copa Príncipe de Asturias winner (2012); LEB Oro champion (2012); Icelandic Cup winner (2021); No. 5 retired by CB Canarias

Nicolás "Nico" Richotti (born 17 October 1986) is an Argentine former professional basketball player. At a height of 1.84 m (6 ft 1/2 in), he played at both the point guard and shooting guard positions, with shooting guard being his main position. His most successful stint came with CB Canarias where he won the FIBA Intercontinental Cup and the FIBA Champions League in 2017 as well as the Copa Príncipe de Asturias and LEB Oro in 2012. In 2021, he won the Icelandic Cup with Njarðvík.

== Professional career ==
Richotti started his career in 2004 at Hindú Resistencia of the Argentine Second League. In 2005, he moved to Italy, on a one-year contract with Bari, in the Italian minor divisions. In 2008, after playing three years in the Italian minors, Richotti signed with the Spanish fourth division team CB San Isidro. One year later, he joined the Real Madrid reserve team, Real Madrid B, before moving to CB Canarias in 2010, where he became the team's captain in 2015.

On September 23, 2019, he has signed with Montakit Fuenlabrada of the Liga Endesa.

In August 2021, Richotti signed with Úrvalsdeild karla club Njarðvík. On 18 September he scored 14 points in Njarðvík's 97–93 win against Stjarnan in the Icelandic Cup final, ending the club's 16 year major title draught. On 2 October 2021, he scored 18 points in Njarðvík's 100–113 loss against Þór Þorlákshöfn in the Icelandic Super Cup. On 7 January 2022, he scored a season high 29 points in a win against Þór Þorlákshöfn. For the season, he averaged 14.4 points, 4.4 rebounds and 5.2 assists.

In October 2022, Richotti resigned with Njarðvík for the 2022–2023 season. On 15 December 2022, he scored 27 points in a victory against KR. On 16 March, he scored a regular season high 28 points in a win against KR. During the regular season, he averaged 14.9 points and 4.5 assists, helping Njarðvík to a league best 17–5 record, tied with Valur. In the first game of the playoffs, he scored a season high 29 points against Grindavík which Njarðvík eventually swept 3–0. In the semi-finals, Njarðvík lost to eventual champions 1–3. In July 2023, he announced his retirement from playing and started working as a basketball ambassador for CB Canarias who in turn retired his nr. 5 jersey.

== National team career ==
Richotti made his first appearances with the senior men's Argentine national team at the 2013 Stanković Continental Champions' Cup. He won the silver medal at the 2014 South American Championship.

He also joined the Argentina senior national team for the 2015 Pan American Games, the 2015 Tuto Marchand Cup, and the 2015 FIBA Americas Championship, where he won a silver medal.

== Trophies ==
=== With CB Canarias ===
- LEB Oro (Spanish 2nd Division): (1)
  - 2012
- Copa Príncipe de Asturias (Spanish Prince's Cup) (Spanish 2nd Cup): (1)
  - 2012
- FIBA Champions League: (1)
  - 2016–17
