= Nacho Yáñez =

Spanish basketball player and manager

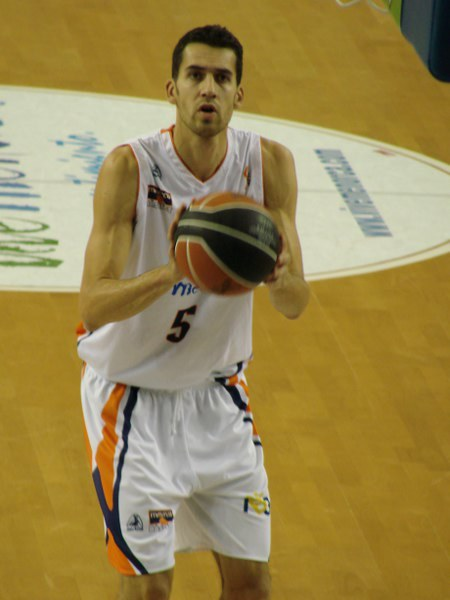

Lenovo Tenerife
- Title: Assistant coach
- League: Liga ACB

Personal information
- Born: April 11, 1973 (age 53) Madrid, Spain
- Listed height: 6 ft 8 in (2.03 m)
- Listed weight: 198 lb (90 kg)

Career information
- Playing career: 1992–2012
- Position: Forward

Career history

Playing
- 1992–1993: Las Rozas
- 1993–1995: Real Canoe
- 1995–1998: Fuenlabrada
- 1998–1999: Ciudad de Huelva
- 1998–2000: Inca
- 2000–2001: Universidad Complutense
- 2001–2002: Estudiantes
- 2002–2004: Tenerife
- 2004–2005: Lleida
- 2005–2007: Menorca
- 2007–2008: León
- 2008: Illescas
- 2008–2009: La Palma
- 2009: Fundación Valdemoro Siglo XXI
- 2009–2012: Canarias

Coaching
- 2012–present: Canarias (assistant)

Ignacio Yáñez Cidad (born April 11, 1973 in Madrid) is a retired Spanish professional basketball player and a current manager.

In April 2012, after becoming champion of LEB Oro and Copa Príncipe de Asturias with Iberostar Canarias, he decided to retire of professional basketball.

== Honours ==
Canarias

- Copa Príncipe MVP: 1
  - 2012

Spain

- Mediterranean Games Gold Medal: 1
  - 2001
