= José Ángel Antelo =

Spanish politician and basketball player

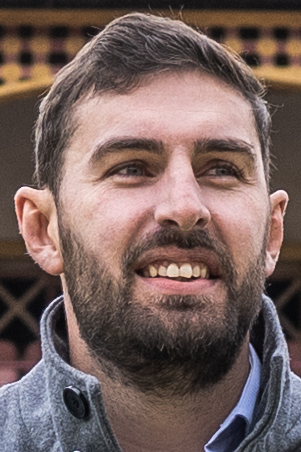
- Antelo in 2023

Personal information
- Born: 7 May 1987 (age 39) Noia, Spain
- Listed height: 6 ft 8 in (2.03 m)
- Listed weight: 100 kg (220 lb)

Career information
- Playing career: 2004–2019
- Position: Power forward
- Number: 6

Career history
- 2004–2005: Cáceres CB
- 2005–2006: Zaragoza
- 2006–2007: Bilbao Basket
- 2007–2008: L'Hospitalet
- 2008–2009: Tenerife
- 2009–2010: Fuenlabrada
- 2010: León
- 2010–2012: Cáceres CdB
- 2012–2019: Murcia
Medals
Men's basketball
Representing Spain
FIBA Europe Under-18 Championship
Gold medal – first place	2004 Spain	Team

José Ángel Antelo Paredes (born 7 May 1987) is a Spanish politician and a retired professional basketball player.

He played as power forward, and made his debut for Real Madrid in Euroleague aged 16, as well as winning the 2004 FIBA Europe Under-18 Championship for Spain. After playing for several clubs between Liga ACB and LEB, he joined UCAM Murcia of the top flight in 2012, staying there until his retirement through injury in 2019.

After retiring from basketball, Antelo was elected to the city council in Murcia in 2019. He was Vox's lead candidate in the 2023 Murcian regional election. The party came third, and he was named vice president of the Council of Government of the Region of Murcia, led by the People's Party (PP). Nine months later, he resigned his government offices as part of a nationwide rupture between the PP and Vox. He was expelled from Vox's parliamentary group in March 2026 and retained his seat in the Regional Assembly of Murcia as an independent.

== Professional career ==
=== Real Madrid ===
Antelo was born in Noia in Galicia, and his father was a civil servant. He was pursued by the academies of several teams, and at age 14 he chose Real Madrid, who wanted to turn him into a successor for Alberto Herreros. He made his debut for the first team in EuroLeague against Lukoil Academic, playing 20 minutes and recording seven points and as many rebounds; at 16 years and 8 months, he was Real Madrid's second youngest debutant after Roberto Núñez.

Antelo reflected in 2013 that he faced too high expectations due to making his debut for Real Madrid at a young age, and had even been considered for the NBA draft. He said that he was not physically prepared for the senior game at age 16.

=== Several teams (2004–2012) ===
Antelo played as professional player for the first time in the defunct Cáceres CB in the LEB Oro, followed by Zaragoza. In 2006–07 he played 25 games in the Liga ACB for Bilbao Basket, before returning to the second division with L'Hospitalet and Tenerife. With the latter in 2008–09, he averaged 9 points and 5.6 rebounds as they fought for promotion.

In July 2009, Antelo returned to the top flight by signing a four-year deal with Fuenlabrada. Halfway through the season, he was loaned to León in the LEB, and in July 2010 he signed for Cáceres Patrimonio de la Humanidad.

=== UCAM Murcia ===
After being nominated as the best national player of the 2011–12 LEB Oro season with Cáceres Patrimonio de la Humanidad, Antelo signed with Liga ACB team UCAM Murcia. In late 2013, he suffered a cruciate ligament injury in a collision with Tibor Pleiß. His team reached the playoffs in 2015–16, losing in the quarter-finals to Real Madrid.

On 27 March 2019, during the 2018–19 season and after spending seven years in Murcia, suffering several injuries, Antelo announced his retirement from the professional basketball. He remained at Universidad Católica San Antonio de Murcia to work for its sports services, and studied a Master of Business Administration in sports marketing.

== National team career ==
Antelo played in all Spanish youth teams, being with the U18 team that were champions of the FIBA Europe Under-18 Championship in 2004. He averaged 19.3 points and 10.5 rebounds in that tournament. In the same year, he also won the Albert Schweitzer Tournament played at Mannheim. At the 2006 FIBA Europe Under-20 Championship, he was sent home for committing a serious foul.

== Political career ==
=== Murcia City Council (2019–2023) ===
On 12 April 2019, right-wing party Vox announced his inclusion in the Murcian regional branch of the party. He was named third on their list for the city of Murcia in the 2019 Spanish local elections, and was elected as his party took their first three seats on the council. Antelo's first proposal as councillor was for a 300 square metre flag of Spain, the biggest in the country, for the city's Plaza Circular; he wanted the military to raise the flag once a month, while playing the national anthem of Spain.

On 4 December 2019, after the dismissal of the main people of the party in the regional branch, Antelo was named president of the party's caretaker committee. After having received the most votes in the Region of Murcia in the 2019 Spanish general election, the national executive of Vox had changed the regional leadership due to a policy of avoiding powerful regional sectors, and Antelo was chosen due to being a loyalist to national leader Santiago Abascal. In September 2020, he was proclaimed regional president of the party as the only candidate with sufficient signatures. He inherited a party in which three of its deputies in the Regional Assembly of Murcia had been expelled due to financial disputes with the national leadership.

=== Regional Assembly of Murcia (2023–) ===
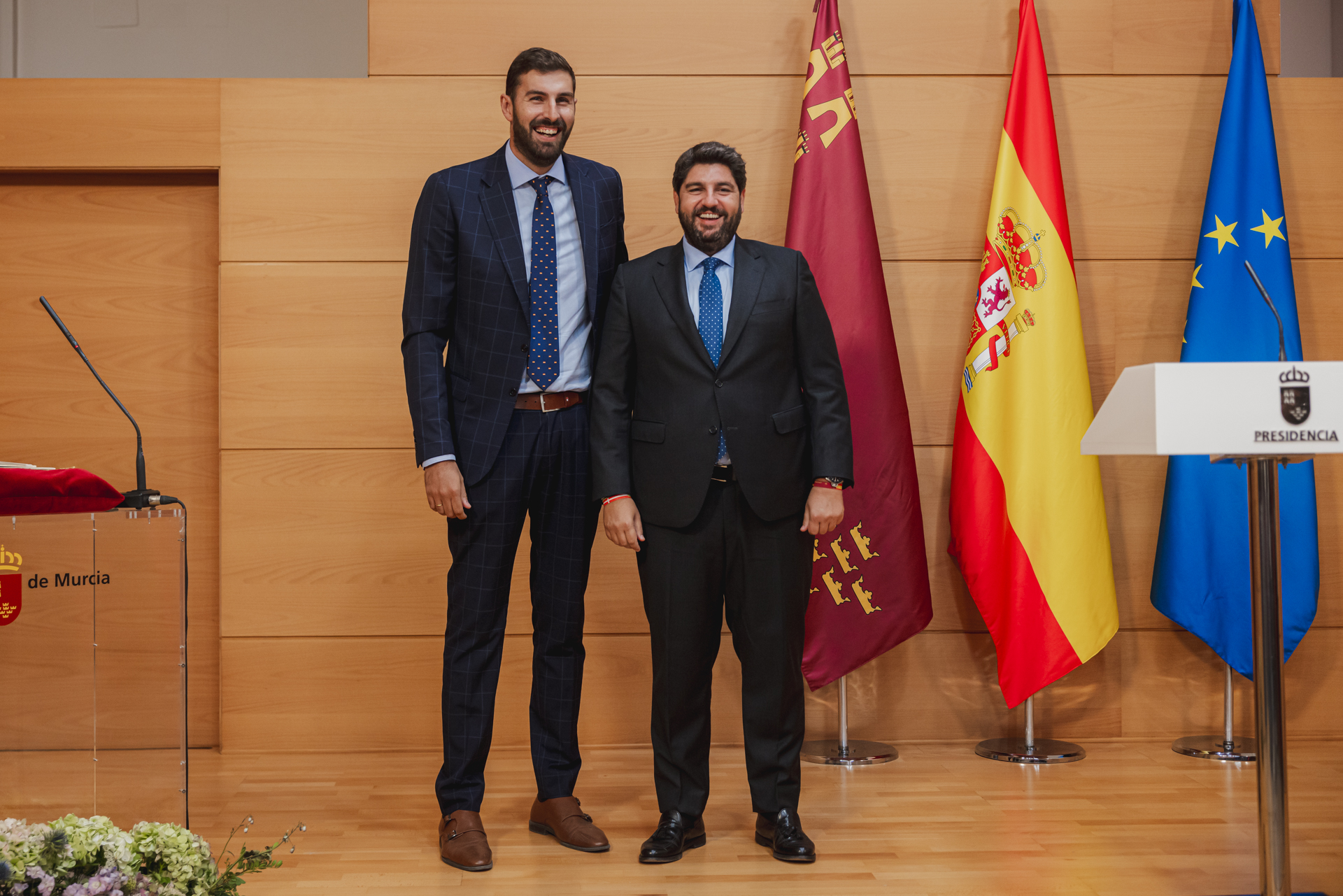
Antelo (left) taking office in September 2023 as vice president of the Council of Government of the Region of Murcia, alongside president Fernando López Miras

At the start of the year, Antelo was named as Vox's lead candidate in the 2023 Murcian regional election. His party came third, rising five seats to nine.

The People's Party (PP) of incumbent President of the Region of Murcia, Fernando López Miras, required the support of Vox to gain a majority. Vox set the repeal of environmental protection for the Mar Menor as a prerequisite for an agreement. At the start of September, the agreement between the two parties was signed and Antelo became vicepresident and minister of security, interior and emergencies in López Miras's third government. Vox withdrew from the government in July 2024 as part of ruptures with the PP in several regions, due to disagreements on immigration; Antelo said it was necessary to avoid complicity in "every machete attack, every rape, and every beheading".

During the 2025 Torre-Pacheco unrest, Antelo said of illegal migrants "We're going to deport all of them, not one will remain". The Spanish Socialist Workers' Party (PSOE), Podemos and the United Left (IU) reported an alleged hate crime. In January 2026, with Antelo not having been called to testify, the investigation was extended for another six months.

On 26 February 2026, the entire executive of Vox in the Region of Murcia resigned due to disagreements with Antelo. Antelo then alleged that his signature was forged to remove him from office as Vox's spokesman in the regional assembly; the party's other members of the assembly expelled him from their group on 4 March, putting him in the mixed group with the sole deputies of Podemos and the United Left. He was supported by Javier Ortega Smith, Iván Espinosa de los Monteros and Juan García-Gallardo, three other figures who had lost roles through disputes with the party leadership.
