= Basket Zaragoza =

Casademont Zaragoza
- Leagues: Liga ACB
- Founded: 2002; 24 years ago
- Arena: Pabellón Príncipe Felipe
- Capacity: 10,744
- Location: Zaragoza, Spain
- Team colors: Red, White, Black
- President: Reynaldo Benito
- Head coach: Gonzalo García de Vitoria
- Championships: 2 LEB championship 1 Copa Príncipe
- Website: Official website
| Home | Away |

Basket Zaragoza 2002 S.A.D., more commonly referred to as Basket Zaragoza and as Casademont Zaragoza for sponsorship reasons, is a professional basketball club based in Zaragoza, Spain. The team plays in the Liga ACB. Their home arena is the Pabellón Príncipe Felipe.

== History ==
Basket Zaragoza was founded in 2002 with the aim of giving the city of Zaragoza back to the Spanish basketball elite league, after old CB Zaragoza left the Liga ACB on 1996. It started playing on LEB, after taking the place belonging to CB Coruña.

CAI Zaragoza spent five hard years on LEB league before reaching Liga ACB for the first time. The team had to overcome a relegation playoff in its first season against CB Ciudad de Huelva, and four consecutive failed promotion playoffs against CB Granada, CB Murcia and Baloncesto León twice.

Finally, CAI Zaragoza got promoted to Liga ACB after winning the title of the 2007–08 season, but its first participation on it was a total failure. CAI Zaragoza got immediately relegated, after being defeated in the last day by CB Murcia. Nevertheless, the team arranged returned to Liga ACB on the next season after the arrival of homegrown coach José Luis Abós.

Under Abos, CAI Zaragoza established on the top Spanish basketball competition; in the 2012–13 season, they qualifying for the first time to the Copa del Rey and reached the ACB semifinals in their first participation in the play-offs for the title. This success allowed CAI Zaragoza to make their debut in European competitions by playing the EuroCup Basketball during three consecutive seasons, reaching the Last 16 stage in the 2015–16 season.

Nevertheless, after Abós's untimely death in 2014, the team struggled in the national competition, and went from reaching the play-offs to barely avoiding relegation. In 2016, after 14 years with CAI, the club changed the sponsorship naming to Tecnyconta Zaragoza.

In the 2018-19 ACB season, under Porfirio Fisac's coaching and after a profound change in their roster, Tecnyconta Zaragoza returned to the ACB play-off and reached the semifinals for the second time in their history.

On 15 June 2020, Basket Zaragoza created the women's team by integrating the professional team of Stadium Casablanca.

== Logos ==
Non-commercial logo until 2017.

Logo under the sponsorship of CAI.

== Players ==
=== Current roster ===
Note: Flags indicate national team eligibility at FIBA-sanctioned events. Players may hold other non-FIBA nationalities not displayed.

Casademont Zaragoza roster
Players
Coaches

| Pos. | No. | Nat. | Name | Ht. | Age |
|---|---|---|---|---|---|
| C | 0 | (United Kingdom) | Olaseni, Gabriel | 2.08 m (6 ft 10 in) | 34 – 29 December 1991 |
| PG | 2 | (Canada) | Bell-Haynes, Trae | 1.88 m (6 ft 2 in) | 31 – 5 September 1995 |
| PF | 3 | (Latvia) | Blumbergs, Roberts | 2.08 m (6 ft 10 in) | 28 – 29 April 1998 |
| G/F | 5 | (United States) | Homesley, Caleb | 1.98 m (6 ft 6 in) | 29 – 27 November 1996 |
| G/F | 7 | (Spain) | González, Miguel | 2.03 m (6 ft 8 in) | 27 – 20 March 1999 |
| SF | 9 | (Argentina) | Brussino, Nicolás | 2.05 m (6 ft 9 in) | 33 – 2 March 1993 |
| PF | 10 | (Spain) | Fernández, Jaime | 2.06 m (6 ft 9 in) | 26 – 15 July 2000 |
| SG | 11 | (United States) | Jaworski, Justin | 1.90 m (6 ft 3 in) | 27 – 21 June 1999 |
| C | 15 | (Lithuania) | Birutis, Laurynas | 2.13 m (7 ft 0 in) | 29 – 27 August 1997 |
| PG | 16 | (Spain) | Vives, Guillem | 1.92 m (6 ft 4 in) | 33 – 16 June 1993 |
| PG | 17 | (Spain) | García, Sergi | 1.93 m (6 ft 4 in) | 29 – 17 February 1997 |
| C | 23 | (Mali) | Traoré, Youssouf (Y) | 2.05 m (6 ft 9 in) | 19 – 26 December 2006 |
| F/C | 44 | (Angola) | Bango, Jilson | 2.08 m (6 ft 10 in) | 27 – 6 January 1999 |

Head coach

- (Spanish Basketball Federation) Gonzalo García de Vitoria

Assistant coach(es)

- (Spanish Basketball Federation) Rodrigo San Miguel
- (Spanish Basketball Federation) Jorge Serna

Legend

- (C) Team captain
- (Y) Youth player
- Injured

- Roster
- Transactions
Updated: September 23, 2026

=== Depth chart ===
| Pos. | Starting 5 | Bench 1 | Bench 2 |
|---|---|---|---|
| C | Laurynas Birutis | Gabriel Olaseni | Youssouf Traoré ‡ |
| PF | Roberts Blumbergs | Jaime Fernández † |
| SF | Nicolás Brussino | Caleb Homesley * |
| SG | Justin Jaworski * | Miguel González † |
| PG | Trae Bell-Haynes | Guillem Vives † | Sergi García † |

Notes: Blue † – homegrown player; (Note: A homegrown player is a player that played for at least three years before the age of 20 on a Spanish team. In Liga ACB, the team must register at least four homegrown players in rosters of 10–12 players or at least three homegrown players in rosters of 8–9 players.) Red * – overseas player; (Note: An overseas player is a player from outside EEA, FIBA Europe or ACP states. In Liga ACB, the team may register at most two overseas players.) Green ‡ – youth player (Note: In Liga ACB, the team may register under-22 players linked to the youth system.)

== Season by season ==
| Season | Tier | Division | Pos. | W–L | Copa del Rey | Other cups | | European competitions | | |
|---|---|---|---|---|---|---|---|---|---|---|
| 2002–03 | 2 | LEB | 14th | 15–20 | | | | | | |
| 2003–04 | 2 | LEB | 4th | 25–19 | | Copa Príncipe | C | | | |
| 2004–05 | 2 | LEB | 6th | 19–18 | | Copa Príncipe | SF | | | |
| 2005–06 | 2 | LEB | 4th | 30–12 | | | | | | |
| 2006–07 | 2 | LEB | 3rd | 26–16 | | | | | | |
| 2007–08 | 2 | LEB Oro | 1st | 28–6 | | Copa Príncipe | SF | | | |
| 2008–09 | 1 | Liga ACB | 17th | 8–24 | | Supercopa | RU | | | |
| 2009–10 | 2 | LEB Oro | 1st | 27–7 | | | | | | |
| 2010–11 | 1 | Liga ACB | 10th | 16–18 | | | | | | |
| 2011–12 | 1 | Liga ACB | 10th | 16–18 | | | | | | |
| 2012–13 | 1 | Liga ACB | 3rd | 23–17 | Quarterfinalist | Supercopa | SF | | | |
| 2013–14 | 1 | Liga ACB | 8th | 18–18 | Semifinalist | | | 2 Eurocup | L32 | 8–8 |
| 2014–15 | 1 | Liga ACB | 9th | 18–16 | Quarterfinalist | | | 2 Eurocup | L32 | 6–10 |
| 2015–16 | 1 | Liga ACB | 12th | 13–21 | | | | 2 Eurocup | EF | 12–6 |
| 2016–17 | 1 | Liga ACB | 15th | 9–23 | | | | | | |
| 2017–18 | 1 | Liga ACB | 16th | 10–24 | | | | | | |
| 2018–19 | 1 | Liga ACB | 6th | 18–16 | | | | | | |
| 2019–20 | 1 | Liga ACB | 6th | 17–11 | Quarterfinalist | | | Champions League | 4th | 13–6 |
| 2020–21 | 1 | Liga ACB | 13th | 14–22 | | | | Champions League | 3rd | 11–3 |
| 2021–22 | 1 | Liga ACB | 16th | 12–22 | | | | FIBA Europe Cup | RS | 2–4 |
| 2022–23 | 1 | Liga ACB | 13th | 12–22 | | | | | | |
| 2023–24 | 1 | Liga ACB | 12th | 13–21 | | | | FIBA Europe Cup | QF | 9–5 |
| 2024–25 | 1 | Liga ACB | 12th | 13–21 | | | | FIBA Europe Cup | QF | 8–5 |

== Honours ==
=== National leagues ===
- 2nd division championships: (2)
  - LEB: (2) 2008, 2010
- Copa Príncipe de Asturias: (1)
  - 2004
- Copa Aragón: (2)
  - 2018, 2019

=== European competition ===
- Basketball Champions League
  - Third place: 2020–21

=== Individual awards ===
Copa Príncipe de Asturias MVP

- Matías Lescano – 2004

Basketball Champions League Best Young Player

- Carlos Alocén – 2020

== Players database ==
Updated as of the end of the 2014–15 season

| Nationality | Name | Season | Valuation |
|---|---|---|---|
| (Spain) | Pablo Aguilar Bermúdez | 2010–2013 | 9'6 |
| (Spain) | Pablo Almazán Sierra | 2011–2012 | 0'8 |
| (Spain) | Alejandro Andreu Sanz | 2005–2006 | 0 |
| (Spain) | Alberto Angulo Espinosa | 2005–2007 | 7'3 |
| (Spain) | José Ángel Antelo | 2005–2006 | 8'5 |
| (United Kingdom) | Robert Archibald | 2011–2012 | 3'9 |
| (Spain) | Ander Arruti Portilla | 2009–2010 | -0'6 |
| (Spain) | Oliver Arteaga | 2005–2006 & 2008–2009 | 3'6 |
| (Australia) | David Barlow | 2009–2011 | 11'2 |
| (United States) | Howard Stephen Brown | 2006–2008 | 4'3 |
| (United States) | John Oliver Brown | 2004–2005 | 9'3 |
| (United States) | Jacob Burtschi | 2011–2012 | 2 |
| (Spain) | Carlos Cabezas | 2010–2012 | 11'8 |
| (Spain) | Jorge Cano Quintana | 2010–2011 | 0'3 |
| (Spain) | Víctor Miguel Catalán Sánchez | 2002–2003 & 2004–2005 | -1 |
| (United States) | Adam Chubb | 2010–2011 | 6'7 |
| (Spain) | Josep Cargol Costa | 2002–2003 | 9'5 |
| (United States) | Lionel Chalmers | 2006–2007 | 9'5 |
| (Spain) | Jesús Antonio Cilla Rubio | 2004–2005 | 4'8 |
| (Argentina) | Diego Ciorciari | 2002–2005 | 10'8 |
| (Spain) | Joaquim "Quino" Colom | 2006–2007 & 2008–2009 | 3'1 |
| (Spain) | Alberto Corbacho | 2006–2007 | 3 |
| (Slovenia) | Blaž Črešnar | 2007–2008 | 0'7 |
| (United States) | Joe Steven Crispin | 2006–2007 | 9'7 |
| (Serbia) | Branko Cvetković | 2008–2009 | 10 |
| (Hungary) | László Dobos | 2013–2014 | 1 |
| (Spain) | Benito Doblado Velázquez | 2003–2004 & 2005–2006 | 2'6 |
| (United States) | Lester Earl | 2003–2004 | 13 |
| (Nigeria) | Chinemelu Elonu | 2009–2010 & 2013–2014 | 8'3 |
| (Spain) | David Ereña | 2002–2004 | -0'3 |
| (Spain) | José Ramón Esmorís | 2003–2004 | 5'2 |
| (Portugal) | Heshimu Evans | 2006–2007 | 12'6 |
| (United States) | Nkechinyelu Peter Ezugwu | 2004–2005 | 6'3 |
| (United States) | Desmond Farmer | 2005–2006 | 6 |
| (Brazil) | Vítor Luiz Faverani Tatsch | 2006–2007 | 10'3 |
| (Spain) | Borja Vidal Fernández Fernández | 2004–2005 | 2'5 |
| (Spain) | Mario Bruno Fernández Hidalgo | 2005–2006 | 10 |
| (Spain) | José Antonio Ferrer González | 2003–2005 | 7'8 |
| (United States) | Josh Fisher | 2004–2005 | -2 |
| (Spain) | Albert Fontet | 2011–2015 | (2'4) |
| (Spain) | Ricardo Eduardo Fox Tejero | 2005–2006 | 0'5 |
| (Spain) | Samuel Adán Fuentes | 2003–2004 | 1 |
| (Spain) | José Luis Galilea | 2004–2005 | 5'8 |
| (Panama) | Rubén Santiago Garcés Riquelme | 2008–2009 | 4'6 |
| (Spain) | Sergi García | 2013–present | (0'6) |
| (Spain) | Adrián García Herepey-Csakanyi | 2012–2013 | (0'5) |
| (Spain) | Asier García Regueiro | 2004–2005 | 7'4 |
| (Spain) | Iván García Casado | 2006–2009 | 0'4 |
| (Spain) | Mario Vicente García Burón | 2002–2003 | 5'1 |
| (United States) | George Gilmore Jr. | 2002–2003 | 7'7 |
| (Spain) | Óscar Marco González de las Cuevas Gómez | 2003–2004 & 2007–2008 | 4'7 |
| (Australia) | Chris Goulding | 2014–present | (5'5) |
| (United States) | Taurean Green | 2008–2009 | 9'5 |
| (Montenegro) | Vladimir Golubović | 2013 | 8'9 |
| (Spain) | Roberto Guerra Santana | 2008–2010 | 2'5 |
| (Brazil) | Rafael Hettsheimeir | 2009–2012 | 12'5 |
| (United States) | Mike Higgins | 2007–2008 | 1'6 |
| (United States) | Otis Hill | 2002–2004 | 17'6 |
| (Serbia) | Stevan Jelovac | 2014–present | (15'8) |
| (Spain) | Juan José Jiménez Martín | 2002–2003 | -1'5 |
| (Spain) | Oriol Junyent Monuera | 2009–2010 | 10'3 |
| (Serbia) | Raško Katić | 2014–present | (6'4) |
| (United States) | William Amar Keys | 2005–2006 | 11'9 |
| (United States) | Mattew Martin Kiefer | 2009–2010 | 5'6 |
| (United States) | Joseph Jones | 2012–2014 | 8'4 |
| (United States) | Marcus Tyrone Landry | 2014–2015 | 10'1 |
| (Spain) | Rogelio Legasa Pérez | 2011–2012 | -1 |
| (Argentina) | Matías Lescano | 2003–2010 | 10'1 |
| (United States) | Lawrence Charles Lewis | 2008–2009 | 11 |
| (United States) | Kevin Lisch | 2014–2015 | 6'3 |
| (Spain) | Pedro Llompart Usón | 2012–present | (10'3) |
| (Panama) | José Jaime Lloreda Ferrón | 2009–2010 | 8'4 |
| (Argentina) | Esteban López | 2005–2006 | 0'6 |
| (Belgium) | Sebastien Robert N. Maio | 2006–2007 | 0'6 |
| (Sweden) | Christian Maråker | 2006–2007 | 6'3 |
| (Spain) | Carles Marco | 2008–2009 | -1'5 |
| (Spain) | Javier Marín Ayerbe | 2009–2010 & 2011–2014 | (-0'8) |
| (Spain) | José Ignacio "Nacho" Martín | 2009–2010 | 4'7 |
| (Spain) | Marc Martí Roig | 2014–present | (1) |
| (Spain) | Carlos Martínez Díaz de Corcuera | 2002–2003 | 8'7 |
| (United States) | Ben McCauley | 2014 | 4'8 |
| (Spain) | Javier Mesa Yáñez | 2003–2004 | 4'9 |
| (Spain) | Andrés Miso | 2010–2011 | 8'6 |
| (Spain) | Francisco José Murcia Sánchez | 2002–2004 | 8 |
| (Netherlands) | Henk Norel | 2012–present | (12'8) |
| (Spain) | Roberto Núñez Sánchez | 2004–2005 | 4'3 |
| (Nigeria) | Ugonna Nnamdi Onyekwe | 2006–2007 | 10'5 |
| (Spain) | José María Panadero Cordón | 2002–2003 | 5'9 |
| (United States) | Pervis Pasco | 2011–2012 | 4'3 |
| (Spain) | Sergio Pérez Anagnostou | 2008–2009 | 2'8 |
| (Spain) | Roberto Pérez Arteaga | 2009–2010 | 1 |
| (Slovakia) | Richard Petruška | 2002–2003 | 21'7 |
| (United Kingdom) | Darren Phillip | 2006–2011 | 10'2 |
| (Italy) | Gianmarco Pozzecco | 2004–2005 | 18 |
| (Spain) | Rubén Elías Quintana Ruano | 2005–2006 | 5'5 |
| (Argentina) | Paolo Alfredo Quinteros | 2007–2011 | 13'7 |
| (Montenegro) | Nikola Rakočević | 2010–2011 | 0 |
| (Croatia) | Damjan Rudež | 2012–2014 | (7'9) |
| (United States) | Antonio de André Reynolds-Dean | 2004–2005 | 19'5 |
| (United States) | Charles Rhodes | 2011–2012 | 3'8 |
| (Spain) | Joan Riera Martí | 2010–2011 | 1'5 |
| (Spain) | Pedro Rivero del Caz | 2009–2010 | 9'6 |
| (United States) | Jason Michael Robinson | 2014–2015 | 8'8 |
| (Spain) | Francisco Robles Campos | 2009–2010 | 1'1 |
| (Brazil) | Gastao Lucio Rodrigues Pinheiro | 2002–2003 | -3 |
| (Spain) | José Antonio Rojas Martín | 2007–2008 | 0'8 |
| (United States) | Michael Roll | 2012–2014 | 9'4 |
| (Cyprus) | Joseph García Roundy | 2005–2007 | 7'2 |
| (Dominican Republic) | Juan José García Rodríguez | 2014–present | (0'7) |
| (Spain) | José Luis Rubio Costa | 2003–2004 | 0 |
| (Spain) | Francisco Javier Ruiz González | 2002–2003 | 0'7 |
| (Spain) | Francisco Sabaté Boada | 2003–2004 | 5'2 |
| (Spain) | Rodrigo San Miguel | 2002–2004 | 2'5 |
| (Spain) | Eduardo Sánchez Cimadevilla | 2009–2010 | 5'4 |
| (Georgia (country)) | Viktor Sanikidze | 2013–2014 | 12'8 |
| (Argentina) | Juan Pablo Sartorelli | 2006–2007 | 2 |
| (Spain) | Joan Sastre Morro | 2014–present | 6'1 |
| (United States) | Brent Scott | 2004–2005 | 14'1 |
| (Georgia (country)) | Giorgi Shermadini | 2013–2014 | (15'8) |
| (Czech Republic) | Ondřej Starosta | 2006–2009 | 11'9 |
| (Iceland) | Jón Arnór Stefánsson | 2011–present | (6'0) |
| (United States) | Terrence Terrell Stewart | 2005–2006 | 3'5 |
| (Belgium) | Jonathan Tabu | 2013–2014 | 7'8 |
| (Spain) | José Javier Terrén Morales | 2004–2006 | -0'3 |
| (Spain) | Pere Tomàs Noguera | 2013–present | (4'9) |
| (United States) | Andre Devalle Turner | 2007–2008 | 2'4 |
| (Germany) | Chad Toppert | 2010–2013 | 3'7 |
| (Spain) | Ricardo Uriz | 2002–2003 | 7'1 |
| (Spain) | Álex Urtasun Uriz | 2013–2014 | 3'7 |
| (Spain) | José Miguel Urtasun Uriz | 2004–2005 | 6'7 |
| (Belgium) | Sam Tom Bert Van Rossom | 2010–2013 | 8'5 |
| (France) | Luc-Arthur Vebobe | 2005–2006 | 9 |
| (United States Virgin Islands) | Cuthbert Victor | 2007–2008 | 14'8 |
| (Argentina) | Lucas Javier Victoriano Acosta | 2006–2009 | 9'7 |
| (Spain) | Rafael Vidaurreta Ramírez | 2005–2007 | 6'3 |
| (United States) | Willie Earl Walls III | 2003–2004 | 11'2 |
| (United States) | Derell Lacero Washington | 2002–2003 & 2005–2006 | 16'5 |
| (United States) | Loren Woods | 2008–2009 | 18'3 |
| (United States) | Bracey Wright | 2011–2012 | (12'4) |
| (Croatia) | Andrija Žižić | 2008–2009 | 2'1 |

== Coaches database ==
| Nat. | Name | Season |
|---|---|---|
| (Spain) | José Luis Oliete Terraz | 2002–2003 |
| (Serbia) | Ranko Žeravica | 2002–2003 |
| (Spain) | Alfred Julbe Bosch | 2002–2004 & 2005–2006 |
| (Spain) | Óscar Quintana Viar | 2004–2005 |
| (Spain) | Jesús Alfonso Mateo Díez | 2006–2007 |
| (Spain) | Francisco Segura Gómez | 2007–2009 |
| (Spain) | Alberto Angulo Espinosa | 2008–2009 |
| (Spain) | José Luis Abós García | 2009–2014 |
| (Spain) | Joaquín Ruiz Lorente | 2014–2015 |
| (Spain) | Andreu Casadevall Guinart | 2015–2017 |
| (Spain) | Luis Guil Torres | 2017 |
| (Spain) | Jota Cuspinera | 2017–2018 |
| (Spain) | Pep Cargol | 2018 |
| (Spain) | Porfirio Fisac | 2018–2020 |
| (Argentina) | Sergio Hernández | 2020–2021 |
| (Spain) | Luis Casimiro | 2021 |
| (Spain) | Jaume Ponsarnau | 2021–2022 |
| (Serbia) | Dragan Šakota | 2022 |
| (Austria) | Martin Schiller | 2022 |
| (Spain) | Porfirio Fisac | 2022–2025 |
| (Spain) | Rodrigo San Miguel | 2025 |
| (Spain) | Jesús Ramírez | 2025–2026 |
| (Spain) | Joan Plaza | 2026 |
| (Spain) | Gonzalo García | 2026–present |

== Women's team ==
Since 2020, Basket Zaragoza has also a women's team. It was created after integrating Stadium Casablanca into the structure of the club. Basket Zaragoza joined to Liga Femenina, instead of Stadium Casablanca which joined to Liga Femenina 2 as a reserve team.

=== Season by season ===
| Season | Tier | Division | Pos. | W–L | Play-off | Copa de la Reina | Supercopa | European competitions | |
|---|---|---|---|---|---|---|---|---|---|
| 2020–21 | 1 | Liga Femenina | 13th | 9–21 | | | | | |
| 2021–22 | 1 | Liga Femenina | 5th | 18–12 | Quarterfinalists | Quarterfinalists | | | |
| 2022–23 | 1 | Liga Femenina | 4th | 22–8 | Semifinalists | Champions | | 2 EuroCup | QF |
| 2023–24 | 1 | Liga Femenina | 3rd | 24–6 | Semifinalists | Runners-up | Semifinalists | 1 EuroLeague | QF |
| 2024–25 | 1 | Liga Femenina | 4th | 20–10 | Runners-up | Semifinalists | Runners-up | 1 EuroLeague | PI |
| 2025–26 | 1 | Liga Femenina | | | | | Champions | 1 EuroLeague | |

=== Current roster ===
Note: Flags indicate national team eligibility at FIBA-sanctioned events. Players may hold other non-FIBA nationalities not displayed.

Casademont Zaragoza roster
Players
Coaches

| Pos. | No. | Nat. | Name | Ht. | Age |
|---|---|---|---|---|---|
| PG | 2 | (United States) | Sheppard, Aisha | 1.75 m (5 ft 9 in) | 27 – 13 November 1998 |
| SG | 3 | (France) | Bankole, Ornella | 1.81 m (5 ft 11 in) | 29 – 17 September 1997 |
| PG | 4 | (Spain) | Ortiz, Mariona | 1.82 m (6 ft 0 in) | 34 – 28 February 1992 |
| C | 5 | (North Macedonia) (United States) | Hempe, Merritt | 1.90 m (6 ft 3 in) | 32 – 27 July 1994 |
| C | 7 | (United States) | Fingall, Nadia | 1.92 m (6 ft 4 in) | 28 – 12 August 1998 |
| SF | 8 | (Czech Republic) | Voráčková, Veronika | 1.88 m (6 ft 2 in) | 27 – 21 June 1999 |
| PG | 10 | (Spain) | Flores, Laia | 1.71 m (5 ft 7 in) | 30 – 1 March 1996 |
| SF | 12 | (Israel) (Germany) | Garzon, Yarden | 1.83 m (6 ft 0 in) | 22 – 23 November 2003 |
| SF | 16 | (Spain) | Oma, Helena | 1.80 m (5 ft 11 in) | 29 – 23 October 1996 |
| PF | 17 | (Latvia) | Vitola, Kristine | 1.96 m (6 ft 5 in) | 35 – 2 June 1991 |
| C | 20 | (Spain) | Hermosa, Nerea | 1.99 m (6 ft 6 in) | 25 – 20 April 2001 |
| C | 45 | (Spain) (Senegal) | Ndour-Fall, Astou | 1.98 m (6 ft 6 in) | 32 – 22 August 1994 |
| PF | 55 | (Spain) | Brito, Carla | 1.79 m (5 ft 10 in) | 22 – 8 October 2004 |

Head coach

- (Spanish Basketball Federation) Carlos Cantero

Assistant coach(es)

- (Spanish Basketball Federation) Glòria Estopà
- (Spanish Basketball Federation) Marie-Pierre Uriarte

Legend

- (C) Team captain
- (Y) Youth player
- Injured

- Roster
Updated: September 30, 2026
