= Copa Princesa de Asturias =

Spanish basketball cup competition

- Formerly: Copa Príncipe de Asturias (until 2015)
- Sport: Basketball
- First season: 1997
- No. of teams: 2
- Country: Spain
- Continent: (European Union) Europe
- Most recent champions: CB Estudiantes (3rd title)
- Most titles: Club Joventut Badalona; Club Melilla Baloncesto; CB Breogán; Palencia Baloncesto; CB Estudiantes (3 titles)
- Related competitions: LEB Oro

The Copa Princesa de Asturias de Baloncesto (English: Princess of Asturias' Cup of Basketball) was an annual 2nd-tier level national cup competition for Spanish professional basketball teams, organized by Spain's 2nd-tier level professional league, the Liga Española de Baloncesto (LEB). It was first played in 1987.

Since 2009, at the end of the first half of the season, the top two teams from the LEB Oro qualify. The Final is at champions venue.

In 2015, the cup changed its name from Copa Príncipe de Asturias to Copa Princesa de Asturias, as Leonor de Borbón became Princess of Asturias.

== Winners (ACB editions) ==
- 3: Joventut
  - 1987, 1989, 1991
- 1: FC Barcelona
  - 1988
- 1: Estudiantes
  - 1986
- 1: Baskonia
  - 1985

== History with ACB Teams ==
=== Copa de la Asociación ===
Year	Venue	Winner	Runner-Up	Result
1985	Villanueva de la Serena	Saski Baskonia	CB Zaragoza	93–85

=== Copa Príncipe de Asturias ===
Year	Venue	Winner	Runner-Up	Result
1986	Alcora	CB Estudiantes	Granollers EB	89–82
1987	Vigo	Joventut Badalona	Bàsquet Manresa	99–80
1988	Palma	FC Barcelona	Real Madrid	92–90
1989	Ferrol	Joventut Badalona	FC Barcelona	84–80
1991	A Coruña	Joventut Badalona	CB Valladolid	72–52

== History with LEB teams ==
Year	Venue	Winner	Runner-Up	Result	MVP
1997	Torrelavega	Cantabria Baloncesto	Gijón Baloncesto	71–68	(United States) Bob Harstad
1998	Pineda de Mar	Baloncesto Fuenlabrada	Bàsquet Inca	91–75	(Croatia) Velimir Perasović
1999	Alicante	Club Melilla Baloncesto	Menorca Bàsquet	93–85	(Spain) José María Panadero
2000	Granada	Club Ourense Baloncesto	Tenerife Baloncesto	76–64	(Spain) Jesús Fernández
2001	Melilla	Club Melilla Baloncesto	Bàsquet Manresa	92–88	(Spain) Alberto Alzamora
2002	Ourense	CB Lucentum Alicante	Tenerife Baloncesto	73–55	(United States) Larry Lewis
2003	Inca	Tenerife Baloncesto	Bilbao Basket	70–55	(Spain) Iván Rodríguez
2004	Zaragoza	Basket Zaragoza	CB Plasencia	89–82	(Argentina) Matías Lescano
2005	Huesca	Baloncesto Fuenlabrada	Menorca Bàsquet	75–74	(United States) Tom Wideman
2006	Palma	CB Murcia	Bàsquet Inca	78–60	(Spain) Juanjo Triguero
2007	Melilla	Baloncesto León	Cantabria Baloncesto	92–71	(Argentina) Paolo Quinteros
2008	Zaragoza	CB Breogán	CB Lucentum Alicante	94–91	(Spain) Roberto Morentin
2009	Alicante	CB Lucentum Alicante	Club Melilla Baloncesto	95–60	(Spain) Txemi Urtasun
2010	Melilla	Club Melilla Baloncesto	Menorca Bàsquet	79–72	(United States) Taylor Coppenrath
2011	Santiago	Obradoiro CAB	CB Murcia	81–78	(Spain) Alberto Corbacho
2012	La Laguna	CB 1939 Canarias	CB Atapuerca	93–85	(Spain) Nacho Yáñez
2013	Burgos	CB Atapuerca	BC Andorra	73–67	(Spain) Isaac López
2014	Andorra la Vella	BC Andorra	Palencia Baloncesto	77–61	(Spain) Jordi Trias
2015	Palencia	Palencia Baloncesto	CB Breogán	78–69	(Spain) Xavi Forcada
2016	Palencia	Palencia Baloncesto	Club Melilla Baloncesto	87–85	(Spain) Dani Rodríguez
2017	Oviedo	Oviedo CB	CB Miraflores	80–77	(Spain) Miquel Salvó
2018	Lugo	CB Breogán	Bàsquet Manresa	90–86	(Spain) Guille Rubio
2019	Seville	Real Betis Baloncesto	Bilbao Basket	80–70	(United States) Thomas Bropleh
2020	Valladolid	Gipuzkoa Basket	CB Ciudad de Valladolid	62–55	(United States) Johnny Dee
2021	Lugo	CB Breogán	Fundación Lucentum Baloncesto	85–74	(Lithuania) Mindaugas Kačinas
2022	Madrid	CB Estudiantes	Fundación CB Granada	73–72	(Spain) Álex Urtasun
2023	Palencia	Palencia Baloncesto	BC Andorra	74–69	(United States) Tanner McGrew
2024	Madrid	CB Estudiantes	Básquet Coruña	80–72	(United States) Alec Wintering

=== Champions ===
Team	Winners	Runners-up	Winning years
Club Melilla Baloncesto	3	2	1999, 2001, 2010
CB Breogán	3	1	2008, 2018, 2021
Palencia Baloncesto	3	1	2015, 2016, 2023
CB Lucentum Alicante	2	1	2002, 2009
Baloncesto Fuenlabrada	2	0	1998, 2005
CB Estudiantes	2	0	2022, 2024
Tenerife Baloncesto	1	2	2003
BC Andorra	1	2	2014
Cantabria Baloncesto	1	1	1997
CB Murcia	1	1	2006
CB Atapuerca	1	1	2013
Club Ourense Baloncesto	1	0	2000
Basket Zaragoza	1	0	2004
Baloncesto León	1	0	2007
Obradoiro CAB	1	0	2011
CB 1939 Canarias	1	0	2012
Oviedo CB	1	0	2017
Real Betis Baloncesto	1	0	2019
Gipuzkoa Basket	1	0	2020
Menorca Bàsquet	0	3	
Bàsquet Inca	0	2	
Bàsquet Manresa	0	2	
Bilbao Basket	0	2	
Gijón Baloncesto	0	1	
CB Plasencia	0	1	
CB Miraflores	0	1	
CB Ciudad de Valladolid	0	1	
Fundación Lucentum Baloncesto	0	1	
Fundación CB Granada	0	1	
Básquet Coruña	0	1	

== LEB Final Four and Final Eight editions ==
=== 1997 ===
Semifinals
1	Gijón Baloncesto	70
4	CB Ciudad de Huelva	63
3	Cantabria Baloncesto	94
2	CB Breogán	90

Final
Gijón Baloncesto	68
Cantabria Baloncesto	71

=== 1998 ===
Quarterfinals
CB Breogán	75
CB Murcia	92
UER Pineda de Mar	74
Bàsquet Inca	90
Club Melilla Baloncesto	89
Fuenlabrada	101
Askatuak SBT	80
CD Juventud Córdoba	78

Semifinals
CB Murcia	75
Bàsquet Inca	79
Fuenlabrada	102
Askatuak SBT	89

Final
Bàsquet Inca	75
Fuenlabrada	91

=== 1999 ===
Quarterfinals
Club Melilla Baloncesto	83
Ourense Baloncesto	78
Círculo Badajoz	97
Gijón Baloncesto	84
CB Lucentum Alicante	74
Tenerife Baloncesto	76
CB Breogán	79
Menorca Bàsquet	93

Semifinals
Club Melilla Baloncesto	89
Círculo Badajoz	58
Tenerife Baloncesto	66
Menorca Bàsquet	76

Final
Club Melilla Baloncesto	93
Menorca Bàsquet	85

=== 2000 ===
Quarterfinals
Tenerife Baloncesto	76
CB Lucentum Alicante	62
CE Lleida Bàsquet	64
Club Melilla Baloncesto	84
Menorca Bàsquet	49
Bàsquet Inca	70
CB Granada	71
Ourense Baloncesto	89

Semifinals
Tenerife Baloncesto	76
Club Melilla Baloncesto	65
Bàsquet Inca	49
Ourense Baloncesto	61

Final
Tenerife Baloncesto	64
Ourense Baloncesto	76

=== 2001 ===
Semifinals
1	Bàsquet Manresa	89
4	CE Lleida Bàsquet	88
3	Baloncesto León	95
2	Club Melilla Baloncesto	101

Final
Club Melilla Baloncesto	92
Bàsquet Manresa	88

=== 2002 ===
Semifinals
1	Bàsquet Manresa	67
4	CB Lucentum Alicante	74
3	Club Ourense Baloncesto	67
2	Tenerife Baloncesto	74

Final
CB Lucentum Alicante	73
Tenerife Baloncesto	55

=== 2003 ===
Semifinals
1	Tenerife Baloncesto	84
4	Menorca Bàsquet	57
3	Bilbao Basket	71
2	Bàsquet Inca	66

Final
Tenerife Baloncesto	70
Bilbao Basket	55

=== 2004 ===
Semifinals
1	CB Plasencia	106
4	UB La Palma	86
3	Basket Zaragoza	98
2	Bilbao Basket	92

Final
CB Plasencia	82
Basket Zaragoza	89

=== 2005 ===
Semifinals
1	Baloncesto Fuenlabrada	75
4	CB Ciudad de Huelva	68
3	Basket Zaragoza	78
2	Menorca Bàsquet	95

Final
Baloncesto Fuenlabrada	75
Menorca Bàsquet	74

=== 2006 ===
Semifinals
1	Baloncesto León	50
4	CB Murcia	66
3	Bàsquet Inca	97
2	CB Alcudia	65

Final
CB Murcia	78
Bàsquet Inca	60

=== 2007 ===
Semifinals
1	Baloncesto León	91
4	CB Villa de Los Barrios	76
3	Cantabria Baloncesto	82
2	Club Melilla Baloncesto	63

Final
Baloncesto León	92
Cantabria Baloncesto	71

=== 2008 ===
Semifinals
1	Basket Zaragoza	95
4	CB Breogán	96
3	CB Lucentum Alicante	87
2	Gipuzkoa BC	81

Final
CB Breogán	94
CB Lucentum Alicante	91

Since 2009, the Copa Príncipe de Asturias is only played with the two top teams at the first half of the LEB Oro season
