= Pavelló Menorca =

Arena in Mahón, Menorca, Spain

Coordinates: 39°52′29″N 4°15′45″E

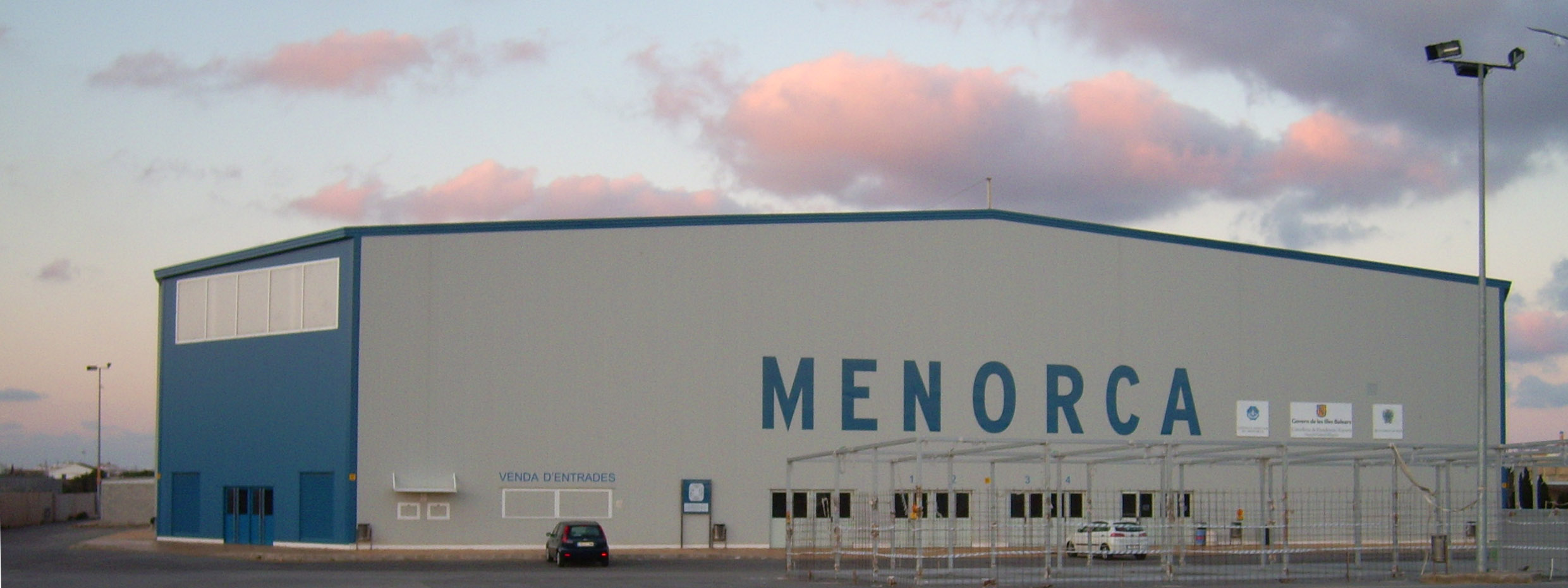
- Interactive map of Pavelló Menorca
- Location: Mahón, Menorca, Spain
- Capacity: 5,115

Construction
- Opened: 2 October 2005

Tenants
- Menorca Bàsquet (2005–2012); CB Menorca (2017–present)

Pavelló Menorca (Spanish: Pabellón Menorca) is an arena in Menorca, Spain. It is located in the area of Binitaufa, in the city of Mahón. It is primarily used for basketball and was the home arena of Menorca Bàsquet. The arena holds 5,115 people and was built in a record time of 100 days in 2005, to host Menorca Bàsquet's home games after the club's promotion to the Liga ACB.

After Menorca Bàsquet disbanded in 2012, the arena has hosted the games of CB Menorca since 2017. The arena has also hosted games in several editions of the World Padel Tour.
