= Ondřej Starosta =

Czech basketball player

Personal information
- Born: 28 May 1979 (age 47) Prague, Czechoslovakia
- Listed height: 7 ft 1 in (2.16 m)
- Listed weight: 118 kg (260 lb)

Career information
- Playing career: 1994–present
- Position: Center

Career highlights
- Spanish 2nd Division MVP (2013); French 2nd Division Foreign Player's MVP (2004)

Ondřej Starosta (born 28 May 1979) is a Czech former professional basketball player.

== Playing career ==
- 1995/98 (Czech Republic) Slavia Praha
- 1998/00 (Czech Republic) Sparta Praha
- 2000/01 (Spain) Real Madrid youth team
- 2001/02 (Belgium) Go Pass Pepinster
- 2002/03 (France) Le Mans
- 2003/04 (France) Saint Quentin Saos
- 2004/05 (France) Espé Châlons-en-Champagne
- 2005/06 (France) Strasbourg
- 2006/09 (Spain) CAI Zaragoza
- 2009/09 (Spain) Plus Pujol Lleida
- 2009/10 (Spain) Melilla Baloncesto
- 2010/11 (Spain) Club Ourense Baloncesto
- 2011/13 (Spain) Grupo Iruña Navarra
- 2013/15 (Slovakia) Inter Bratislava

== Honours ==
CAI Zaragoza

- LEB Champion: 1
  - 2008
