= Marcus Vinicius (basketball, born 1986) =

Brazilian-Spanish basketball player

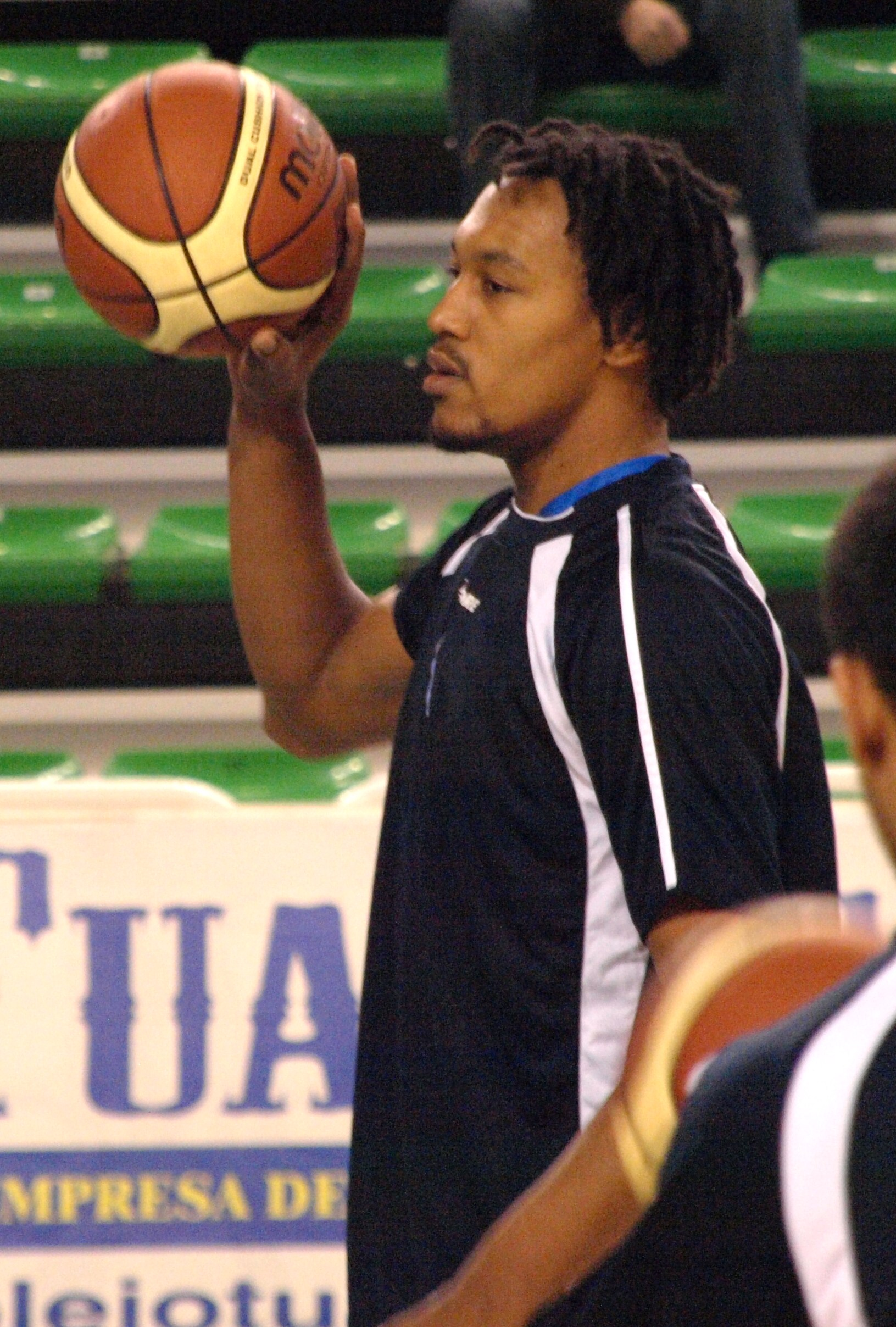

CB Valls
- Position: Power forward
- League: Liga EBA

Personal information
- Born: July 10, 1986 (age 40) Araraquara, São Paulo, Brazil
- Listed height: 6 ft 8 in (2.03 m)
- Listed weight: 230 lb (104 kg)

Career information
- NBA draft: 2008: undrafted
- Playing career: 2003–present

Career history
- 2003–2009: Lleida
- 2004–2005: →L'Hospitalet
- 2005–2006: →Valls
- 2006–2007: →Tarragona
- 2009–2010: Manresa
- 2010–2013: Atapuerca
- 2013–2014: Mogi das Cruzes
- 2014–2015: Pinheiros
- 2015–2017: Cearense
- 2017–2020: Pinheiros
- 2020–2021: Força Lleida
- 2021–: Valls
Medals
Men's basketball
Representing Brazil
FIBA South American Championship
Gold medal – first place	2006 Caracas
Silver medal – second place	2016 Caracas
Pan American Games
Gold medal – first place	2007 Rio de Janeiro
Gold medal – first place	2015 Toronto

Marcus Vinicius Urban Toledo dos Reis (born July 10, 1986) is a Brazilian / Spanish professional basketball player for Valls of the Liga EBA.

== Honours and awards ==
Ford Burgos

- LEB Oro: 1
  - 2013

Plus Pujol Lleida

- LEB Catalan League Champion: 2
  - 2007, 2008

L'Hospitalet

- LEB Plata Champions: 1
  - 2005

Brazil

- FIBA South American Championship Gold Medal: 1
  - 2006
- Pan American Games Gold Medal: 2
  - 2007, 2015
