= Darren Phillip =

American professional basketball player (born 1978)

Personal information
- Born: March 18, 1978 (age 48) London, England
- Listed height: 6 ft 7 in (2.01 m)
- Listed weight: 230 lb (104 kg)

Career information
- High school: South Shore (Brooklyn, New York)
- College: Fairfield (1996–2000)
- NBA draft: 2000: undrafted
- Playing career: 2000–present
- Position: Power forward

Career history
- 2000–2002: Unicaja Málaga
- 2002–2003: Casademont Girona
- 2003–2004: Unicaja Málaga
- 2004–2006: Caja San Fernando
- 2006–2007: Strong Island Sound
- 2007–2011: CAI Zaragoza
- 2011–2012: Ford Burgos
- 2012–2013: Unión Progresista
- 2013: Piratas de Quebradillas
- 2013: Atléticos de San Germán
- 2013–2014: Quimsa
- 2014–2015: Juventud Sionista
- 2015: Leones de Ponce
- 2015–2016: Ciclista Olímpico
- 2016: Deportes Concepción

Career highlights
- Argentine League Top Scorer (2013); NCAA rebounding leader (2000); 2× First-team All-MAAC (1999, 2000)

Darren Douglas Phillip (born March 18, 1978) is an American former professional basketball player. Phillip a.k.a. "Primal Fear" is also a well known streetball player on the basketball courts of the New York City summer leagues. He was the 2000 NCAA rebounding leader.

== College career ==
Born in London, England, he attended high school in Brooklyn, New York, later playing college basketball at Fairfield University in Connecticut. At Fairfield, he was a two-time First Team All-MAAC selection. As a senior, Phillip led the nation in rebounds per game (14.0 rpg), while tallying a nation-leading 24 double-doubles including 19 straight to end the season and posting a MAAC single game record 25 rebounds in the team's win over Marist College. As a freshman, Phillip was a starter on the Stags team which held a half time lead over the number 1 seed University of North Carolina Tar Heels before falling short in the 1997 NCAA Men's Basketball Championship tournament. Phillip received his bachelor's degree in communications from Fairfield University in 2000.

== Professional career ==
Phillip was invited to the Philadelphia 76ers summer camp in 2000. Not offered a guaranteed contract, Phillip opted to sign a two-year guaranteed contract with CB Málaga, a team based in Málaga, Andalusia that plays in Spain's top league, the Asociación de Clubs de Baloncesto. After playing six years in Spain with three different teams, Phillip signed with the Strong Island Sound of the American Basketball Association in 2006. Phillip lead the league with 12.5 rebounds per game while tallying 10 double-doubles in 13 games. In December 2006, Phillip returned to Spain to play his seventh season with CAI Zaragoza.

Five years later, in September 2011, he signs for Ford Burgos.

== Streetball career ==
Phillip has been regarded as one of the leading post players on New York City's summer basketball circuit, where he won multiple championships and awards at Hoops In the Sun at Orchard Beach, Nike Pro City, and EBC Rucker Park. He is also known by the nickname "Primal Fear."

Phillip's streetball resume includes team champions of the 2001 Hoops in the Sun; 2002, 2003, 2004 and 2006 EBC Rucker Park; 2004, 2005, 2007 Nike Pro City; 2006 and 2007 Brooklyn Nike Pro City; 2004 and 2005 West 4th Street; and the 2004, 2005, 2006 Original Rucker tournaments. And he was MVP of the 2005 EBC Rucker Park, 2007 Nike Brooklyn Pro City, 2007 Nike Pro City, and the 2004 and 2005 Original Rucker tournaments. Phillip appeared in the "EBC at Rucker Park: Season Two" DVD released in 2002.

== See also ==
- List of NCAA Division I men's basketball season rebounding leaders
