= Multiusos Ciudad de Cáceres =

Sports arena in Cáceres, Extremadura, Spain

Coordinates: 39.4601°N 6.3785°W

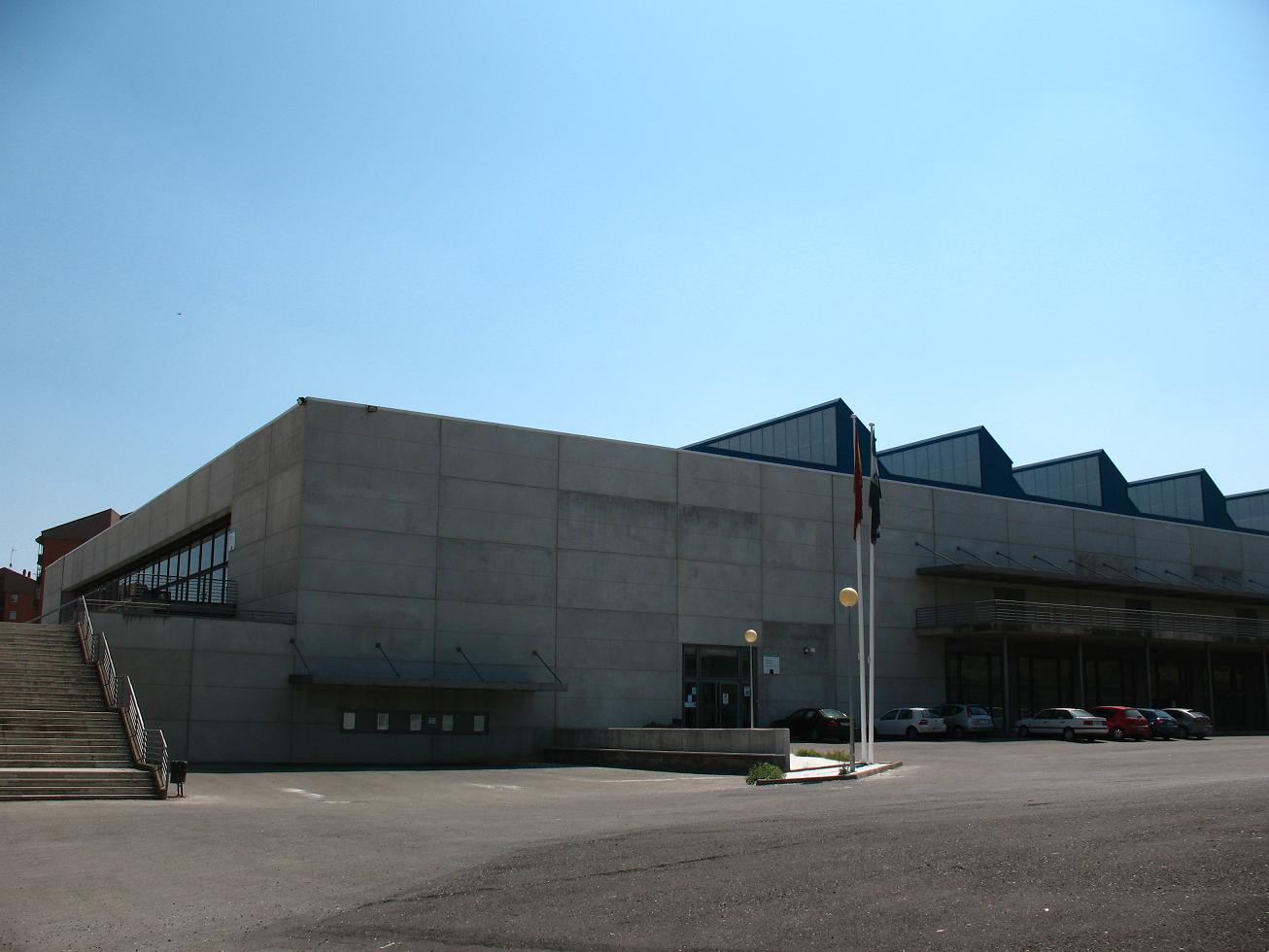
- Interactive map of Multiusos Ciudad de Cáceres
- Full name: Pabellón Multiusos Ciudad de Cáceres
- Location: Cáceres, Extremadura
- Owner: Cáceres City Hall
- Capacity: 6,550
- Surface: Parquet Floor

Construction
- Opened: 1999
- Cost: 800M ₧

Tenant
- Cáceres Ciudad del Baloncesto

The Multiusos Ciudad de Cáceres is a multi-purpose sports arena located in Cáceres, Extremadura, Spain. It has a capacity of 6,550 spectators.

The arena was constructed due to the need of a new arena for the Liga ACB games of Cáceres CB. Financed by the Extremadura Government, it cost 800 million pesetas.

Finally, it was opened on September 9, 1999, in a Liga ACB game against Adecco Estudiantes.
