= Baloncesto León =

- Leagues: LEB Oro
- Founded: 1981
- Dissolved: 2012
- Arena: Palacio de los Deportes
- Location: León, Spain
- Team colors: Red and white
- President: Miguel Fernández-Llamazares
- Head coach: Javier de Grado
- Championships: 1 Copa Príncipe; 1 Copa Castilla y León
- Website: baloncestoleon.com
Home	Away

Club Baloncesto León was a basketball team, based in León, Spain.

== History ==
=== Early years (1981-1988) ===
Baloncesto León was founded by José Antonio Moirón García, Enrique Emperador Marcos, Juan Carlos Rodríguez Villanueva, Lisardo Mourelo González and Alberto Sobrín Martínez in León on 20 May 1981.

It began to play in Tercera División, the fourth division of Spanish basketball. In 1981, the team was promoted to Segunda División. After four years playing in the third tier, Baloncesto León was promoted to Primera División B, the second division.

=== Aranzana's first era (1989-1997) ===
In the middle of the 1988-1989 season, the coach Mariano Parra was sacked because Baloncesto León was in relegation posts. Then Baloncesto León signed Gustavo Aranzana, the coach of Cajapalencia, a team which was playing in Segunda División. Baloncesto León managed to leave relegation, and the next year, led by Xavi Fernández, was promoted to the ACB for first time in its history.

Baloncesto León's years under Aranzana's leadership were the most successful in the history of the team. Both in the 1991-1992 and 1992-1993 seasons, Baloncesto León reached position six in ACB.

In 1994 several things changed. The team changed the color of the T-shirt from yellow and green to red. Also, Xavi Fernandez transferred to FC Barcelona. Finally, in 1997, Aranzana left the team.

=== Decline and relegation (1997-2000) ===
In 1997, Edu Torres was hired as coach. He left the team after two years of failing to enter the playoffs. In 1999-2000, the team, coached by José Luis Oliete, was the last team in the classification, so Baloncesto León was relegated to LEB.

=== LEB (since 2000) and Aranzana's second era (since 2005) ===
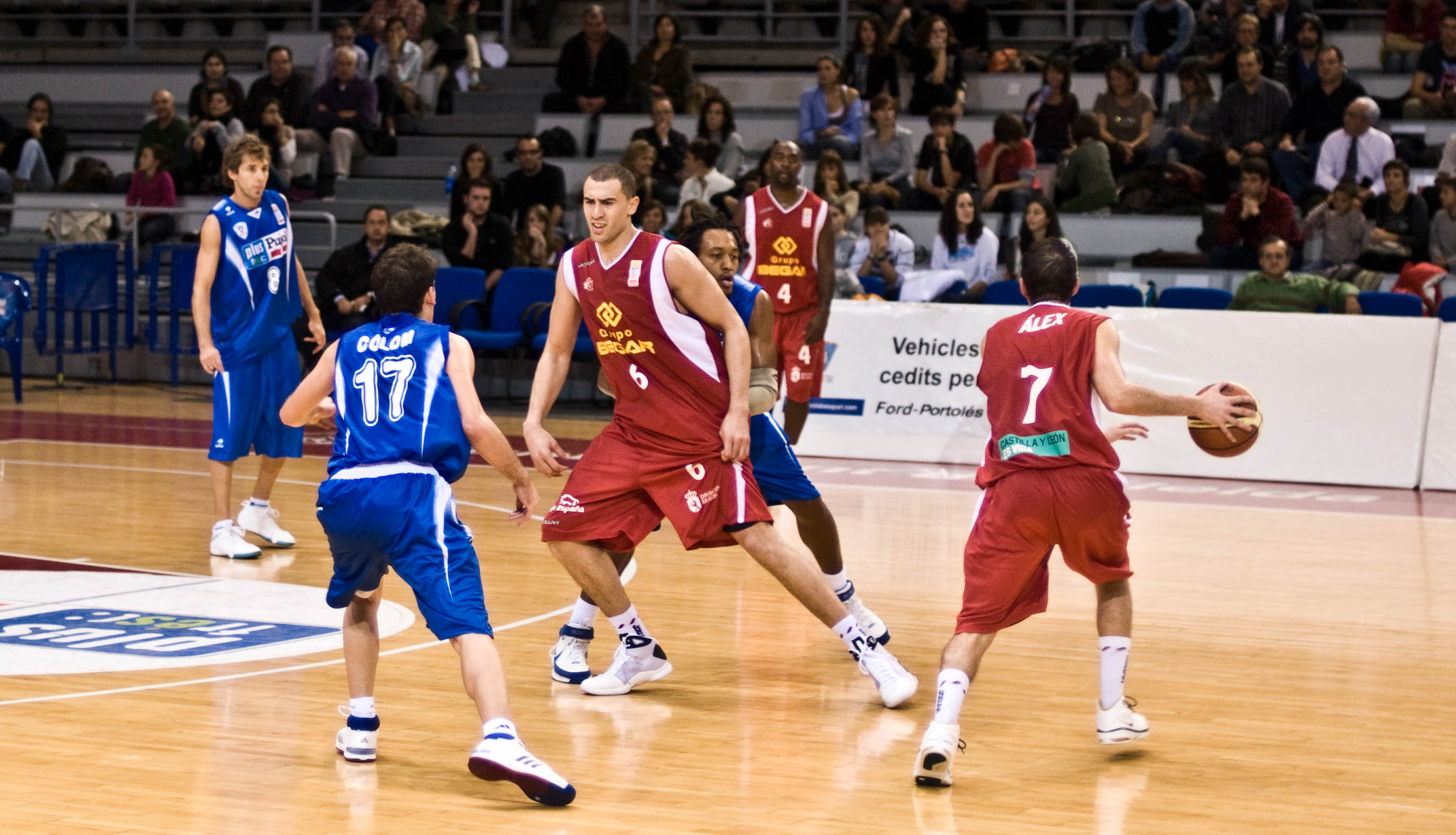
A match against Plus Pujol Lleida in 2008.

Since 2000, Baloncesto León has been playing in the second category of Spanish basketball. The team has come close to promotion on several occasions, but has not achieved it.

After being coached by Roberto Herreras, Quino Salvo and Ángel Jareño, in 2005, Gustavo Aranzana was signed again as coach. In 2005–2006, Baloncesto León was, along with CAI Zaragoza, the highest-ranking team in the LEB regular season. In fact, Baloncesto León won the Regular Season. In the playoff, Baloncesto León easily defeated Palma Aqua Mágica and reached the semifinal round. Both final competitors of the semifinals get promoted. The rival was Bruesa GBC, 5th in regular season, which defeated Baloncesto León by 3-0. CAI Zaragoza did not get promoted.

In 2006–2007 the team reached the second position in the end of the Regular Season. For first time in several years the team got a private sponsorship, Climalia. In the playoff, Baloncesto León defeated again Palma Aqua Mágica, (3-2). In the semifinals, they played versus CAI Zaragoza. León won the round 3–2, so, along with Ricoh Manresa got promoted to Liga ACB the 5/26/2007.

In the 2007–2008 season, León made a very poor season and they were relegated again to LEB Oro after winning only eight of their 34 matches. Their most surprising winning was in Vitoria, against Tau Cerámica. After that season, León continues playing in the LEB League, where they reached the play-offs in the next two seasons with Javier de Grado as coach.

After the 2011–2012 season the club ceased in activity and was dissolved. A new club was created to replace old Baloncesto León. It is called Fundación Baloncesto León and played its first season at Liga EBA.

== Season by season ==
Season	Tier	Division	Pos.	W–L	Copa del Rey	Other cups		European competitions		
1980–81	4	3ª División	2nd							
1981–82	4	3ª División	1st							
1982–83	3	2ª División	15th							
1983–84	3	2ª División	5th							
1984–85	3	2ª División	3rd							
1985–86	3	2ª División	1st							
1986–87	2	1ª División B	8th	19–15						
1987–88	2	1ª División B	17th	23–22						
1988–89	2	1ª División	11th	17–16						
1989–90	2	1ª División B	2nd	19–11						
1990–91	1	Liga ACB	20th	16–22	Quarterfinalist					
1991–92	1	Liga ACB	6th	27–12	Quarterfinalist					
1992–93	1	Liga ACB	6th	19–16	Third round			3 Korać Cup	QF	7–5
1993–94	1	Liga ACB	13th	14–18	Third round			3 Korać Cup	GS	6–4
1994–95	1	Liga ACB	9th	19–19	Quarterfinalist					
1995–96	1	Liga ACB	12th	18–20	Quarterfinalist					
1996–97	1	Liga ACB	6th	21–17	Semifinalist					
1997–98	1	Liga ACB	11th	14–20				3 Korać Cup	R32	13–1
1998–99	1	Liga ACB	16th	13–21						
1999–00	1	Liga ACB	18th	10–24						
2000–01	2	LEB	5th	24–10		Copa Príncipe	SF			
2001–02	2	LEB	5th	20–15						
2002–03	2	LEB	3rd	20–19						
2003–04	2	LEB	4th	23–19						
2004–05	2	LEB	3rd	28–13						
2005–06	2	LEB	3rd	29–11		Copa Príncipe	SF			
2006–07	2	LEB	2nd	28–16		Copa Príncipe	C			
2007–08	1	Liga ACB	18th	8–26						
2008–09	2	LEB Oro	8th	18–18						
2009–10	2	LEB Oro	7th	19–18						
2010–11	2	LEB Oro	6th	21–17						
2011–12	2	LEB Oro	14th	15–19						

== Trophies and awards ==
=== Trophies ===
- Copa Príncipe: (1)
  - 2007
- Copa Castilla y León: (1)
  - 2004

=== Individual awards ===
LEB Oro MVP

- Michael Wilson – 2001

== Notable players ==
- (Spain) Xavi Fernández
- (Spain) José Lasa
- (United States) Essie Hollis
- (United States) Corny Thompson
- (United States) Tate Decker
- (Spain) Óscar Yebra
- (Argentina) Paolo Quinteros
- (United States) Amal McCaskill
- (United States) J.R. Reid
- (United States) Byron Houston

== Notable coaches ==
- (Spain) Gustavo Aranzana

== List of coaches ==
- (Spain) José Estrada 1980–1984
- (Spain) Antonio Garrido 1984–1987
- (Spain) José Clavijo 1987–1988
- (Spain) Mariano Parra 1988–1989
- (Spain) Gustavo Aranzana 1989–1997, 2005–2008
- (Spain) Eduard Torres 1997–1999
- (Spain) José Luis Oliete 1999–2000
- (Spain) Roberto Herreras 2002
- (Spain) Quino Salvo 2002–2003
- (Spain) Angel Jareño 2003–2005
- (Spain) Javier de Grado 2008–2012
