= Menorca Bàsquet =

- Leagues: ACB
- Founded: 1950
- Dissolved: 2012
- Arena: Pavelló Menorca
- Location: Mahón, Menorca, Illes Balears
- Team colors: White, blue and orange
- President: Benito Reynés
- Head coach: Josep Maria Berrocal
- Championships: 1 Liga EBA championship
- Website: menorcabasquet.com
Home	Away

Menorca Bàsquet, S.A.D. was a professional basketball team based in Menorca, Balearic Islands.

On July 5, 2012 the club announced its dissolution after it was forced to renounce to its third promotion to Liga ACB, putting an end to 62 years of history.

== Sponsors ==
- 2000–2004: Coinga, the club was renamed Coinga Menorca Básquet
- 2004–2005: IBB Hoteles, the club was renamed IBB Hoteles Menorca Básquet
- 2005–2006: Llanera, the club was renamed Llanera Menorca
- 2006–2010: ViveMenorca, the club was renamed ViveMenorca

== Team logos ==
Original logo

2006–2010

2010–2012

== Season by season ==
Season	Tier	Division	Pos.	W–L	Cup competitions	
1979–80	4	3ª División	5th			
1980–81	4	3ª División	2nd			
1981–82	4	3ª División	2nd			
1982–83	4	3ª División	1st			
1983–84	3	2ª División	13th			
1984–85	4	3ª División	1st			
1985–86	3	2ª División	13th			
1986–87	3	2ª División	3rd			
1987–88	3	2ª División	4th			
1988–89	3	2ª División	5th			
1989–90	3	2ª División	6th			
1990–91	3	2ª División	5th			
1991–92	3	2ª División	4th			
1992–93	3	2ª División	6th			
1993–94	3	2ª División	4th			
1994–95	2	Liga EBA	11th	12–18		
1995–96	2	Liga EBA	9th	15–15		
1996–97	3	Liga EBA	1st	26–6	Copa EBA	SF
1997–98	2	LEB	6th	14–17		
1998–99	2	LEB	4th	19–17	Copa Príncipe	RU
1999–00	2	LEB	4th	24–15	Copa Príncipe	QF
2000–01	2	LEB	4th	21–18		
2001–02	2	LEB	11th	12–18		
2002–03	2	LEB	5th	22–13	Copa Príncipe	SF
2003–04	2	LEB	5th	22–17		
2004–05	2	LEB	2nd	32–11	Copa Príncipe	RU
2005–06	1	Liga ACB	16th	12–22		
2006–07	1	Liga ACB	15th	12–22		
2007–08	1	Liga ACB	16th	12–22		
2008–09	1	Liga ACB	16th	8–24		
2009–10	2	LEB Oro	2nd	30–18	Copa Príncipe	RU
2010–11	1	Liga ACB	18th	7–27		
2011–12	2	LEB Oro	2nd (Note: Resigned to promote to Liga ACB and the club was finally dissolved.)	30–15		

== Supporter Groups ==
- A por ellos
- Penya Forera Jaleo
