= 2024–25 Spain Cup =

Spanish basketball cup competition

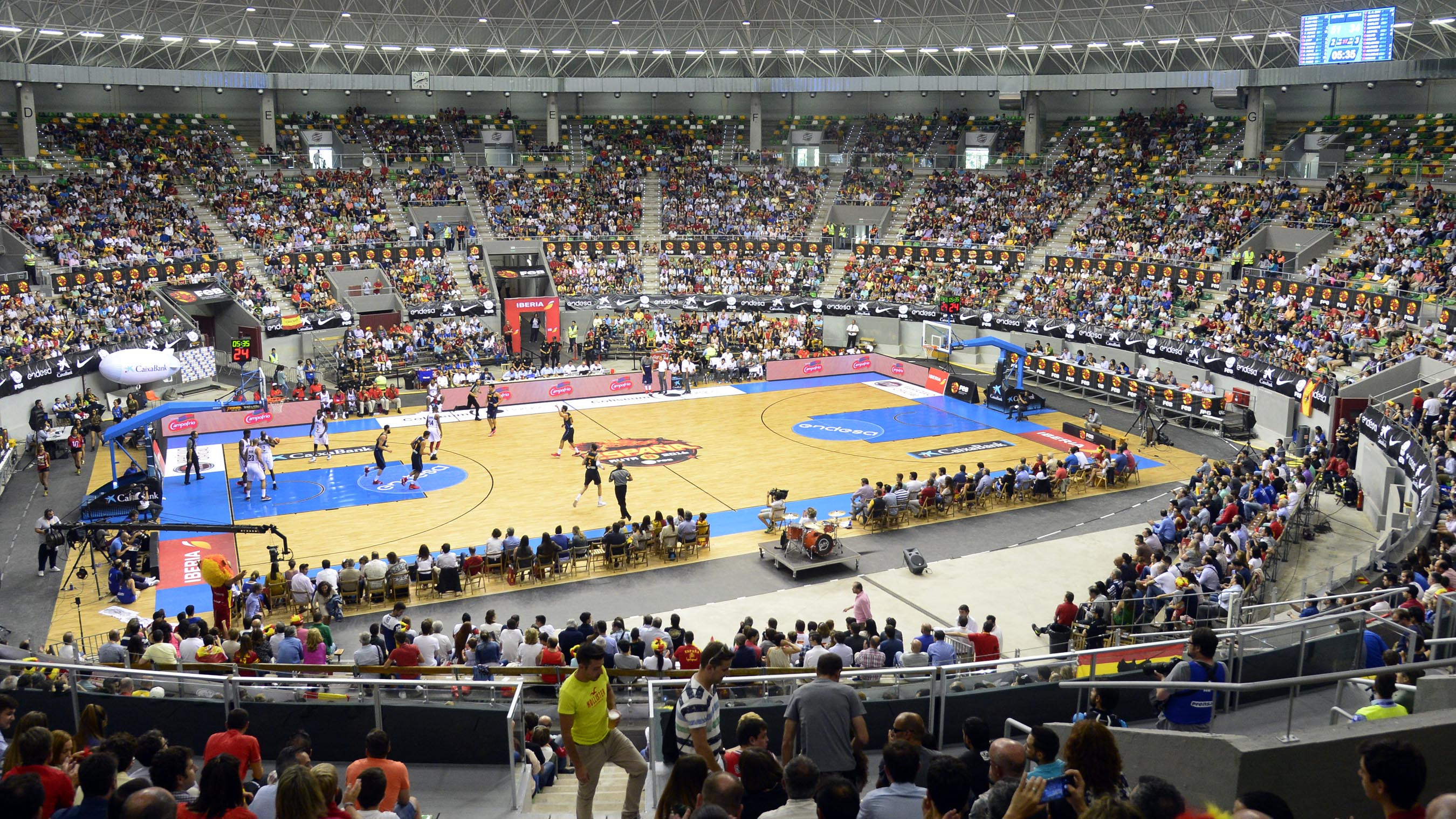
- The Coliseum Burgos hosted the Final Four.

Tournament details
- Country: Spain
- City: Burgos
- Venue: Coliseum Burgos
- Dates: 6 September 2024 – 25 January 2025
- Teams: 40

Final positions
- Champions: Silbö San Pablo Burgos (1st title)
- Runners-up: Monbus Obradoiro
- Semifinalists: Real Betis Baloncesto; ODILO FC Cartagena CB

Tournament statistics
- Matches played: 91

Awards
- MVP: Gonzalo Corbalán (Silbö San Pablo Burgos)

The 2024–25 Spain Cup was the inaugural edition of the Spain Cup, a men's basketball competition created with the aim to replace the Copa Princesa de Asturias and the Copa LEB Plata. It was played by teams competing in the 2024–25 season of the Primera FEB and the Segunda FEB.

Silbö San Pablo Burgos achieved the first title of the history of the competition in front of its supporters devoted to their team.

Across mainland Spain, match times up to 26 October 2024 are CEST (UTC+2) and from 27 October 2024 are CET (UTC+1); matches played in the Canary Islands up to 26 October 2024 use the WEST (UTC+1) and from 27 October 2024 are WET (UTC+0).

== Schedule and format ==
In the summer of 2024, the Spanish Basketball Federation released the calendar of the new competition.

Schedule for 2024–25 Spain Cup
Phase	Round	Draw date	First leg	Second leg
Group stage	Matchday 1	19 July 2024	6–8 September 2024	
Group stage	Matchday 2	19 July 2024	12–18 September 2024	
Group stage	Matchday 3	19 July 2024	11, 20–22 September 2024	
Group stage	Matchday 4	19 July 2024	22 October 2024	
Group stage	Matchday 5	19 July 2024	12 November 2024	
Quarter-finals		20 November 2024	23 December 2024	7 January 2025
Final Four	Semi-finals	20 November 2024	24 January 2025	
Final Four	Final	20 November 2024	25 January 2025	

== Qualified teams ==
The following teams qualified for the competition. In case of vacant places, they were placed in order of their final position in the last LEB Plata and Liga EBA seasons.

Liga ACB; The two relegated teams to Primera FEB from the 2023–24 season	LEB Oro; All 16 non-promoted teams that played the 2023–24 season	LEB Plata; The 20 best qualified teams after the 2023–24 season	Liga EBA; The two winners of the promotion stages of the 2023–24 season
Monbus Obradoiro; Súper Agropal Palencia	Alimerka Oviedo Baloncesto; Amics Castelló; Flexicar Fuenlabrada; Cáceres Patrimonio de la Humanidad; Club Ourense Baloncesto; Gipuzkoa Basket; Grupo Alega Cantabria; Grupo Ureta Tizona Burgos; Hestia Menorca; HLA Alicante; Melilla Ciudad del Deporte; Movistar Estudiantes; Real Betis Baloncesto; Rioverde Clavijo; Silbö San Pablo Burgos; UEMC Real Valladolid Baloncesto	Biele ISB; Bueno Arenas Albacete Basket; Caja Rural CB Zamora; CB L'Horta Godella; CB Naturavia Morón; CB Prat; CB Santfeliuenc; Ciudad de Huelva; Class Bàsquet Sant Antoni; Clínica Ponferrada SDP; Damex UDEA Algeciras; Fibwi Palma; Gran Canaria B; Homs UE Mataró; Lobe Huesca La Magia; Maderas Sorlí Benicarló; ~~Melilla Ciudad del Deporte Enrique Soler~~ (Note: It merged in a single team with Melilla Ciudad del Deporte); OCA Global CB Salou; ODILO FC Cartagena CB; Palmer Basket Mallorca Palma (Note: It achieved a vacant berth after the merger of the two teams of the city of Melilla.); Teknei Bizkaia Zornotza	Nadunet Refitel Bàsquet Llíria; La Salud Archena

== Group stage ==
The group stage, which had a total of 40 teams from the Primera FEB and the Segunda FEB, consisted of eight groups of five teams in each group that had been configured according to criteria of geographical and sporting distribution and compensation between divisions. In each group, each team played four matches over five matchdays of competition. The first three matchdays were played throughout the first three weeks of September prior to the start of the leagues and the last two matchdays were played on October 22 and November 12. At the end of the group stage, the eight top teams from each group advanced for the quarter-finals.

=== Group A ===
Pos	Team	Pld	W	L	PF	PA	PD	Pts	Qualification
1	Monbus Obradoiro	4	4	0	380	257	+123	8	Qualification to quarter-finals
2	Club Ourense Baloncesto	4	3	1	384	321	+63	7	
3	CB Prat	4	2	2	323	334	−11	6	
4	Homs UE Mataró	4	1	3	296	335	−39	5	
5	CB Santfeliuenc	4	0	4	276	412	−136	4	

Source: FEB

7 September 2024	Monbus Obradoiro	87–83	Club Ourense Baloncesto	Santiago de Compostela
18:30	Scoring by quarter: 25–20, 14–19, 23–25, 25–19
	Pts: Jiménez 21; Rebs: Stephens 7 Asts: three players 3 Eff: Jiménez 25	Boxscore	Pts: Lisboa 19; Rebs: Krikke 8 Asts: Lisboa, López 4 Eff: Krikke 17	Arena: Multiusos Fontes do Sar; Referees: Jacobo Rial, Alejandro Pellitero, Laura Piñeiro

8 September 2024	CB Santfeliuenc	73–86	CB Prat	Sant Feliu de Llobregat
19:00	Scoring by quarter: 26–22, 10–26, 14–17, 23–21
	Pts: Reid 12; Rebs: Planell 8 Asts: Planell, Reid 3 Eff: Planell 20	Boxscore	Pts: Nogués 26; Rebs: Franch, Ordóñez 8 Asts: Costa 5 Eff: Nogués 26	Arena: Juan Carlos Navarro; Referees: Víctor Mas, Josep Lluís Presseguer, Christian Abalo

11 September 2024	CB Prat	91–97	Club Ourense Baloncesto	El Prat de Llobregat
17:00	Scoring by quarter: 16–27, 23–21, 28–34, 24–15
	Pts: Ventura 17; Rebs: Nogués, Simikj 6 Asts: Ventura 6 Eff: Ventura 28	Boxscore	Pts: Lisboa 18; Rebs: Mendicote 6 Asts: Lisboa 6 Eff: Lisboa 22	Arena: Pavelló Joan Busquets; Referees: Víctor Mas, Alexis Fuentes, Iván del Baño

11 September 2024	Homs UE Mataró	60–94	Monbus Obradoiro	Mataró
18:00	Scoring by quarter: 23–22, 20–27, 4–16, 13–29
	Pts: Juanola 19; Rebs: Martí 5 Asts: Baqués 4 Eff: Juanola 22	Boxscore	Pts: Jiménez, Stephens 12; Rebs: Jiménez 7 Asts: three players 4 Eff: Jiménez 18	Arena: Josep Mora; Referees: Pol Franquesa, Christian Ruiz, Álvaro Ortín

13 September 2024	CB Santfeliuenc	52–118	Monbus Obradoiro	Sant Feliu de Llobregat
19:30	Scoring by quarter: 12–36, 13–26, 15–32, 12–24
	Pts: Martínez 10; Rebs: Henry 4 Asts: Martínez 3 Eff: Martínez 9	Boxscore	Pts: Davison, Stephens 19; Rebs: Stephens 8 Asts: Varela 7 Eff: Stephens 26	Arena: Juan Carlos Navarro; Referees: Josep María Olivares, Miguel Ángel Soto, Jorge Ibarra

14 September 2024	Club Ourense Baloncesto	85–64	Homs UE Mataró	Ourense
17:30	Scoring by quarter: 27–12, 19–12, 18–19, 21–21
	Pts: Gill 17; Rebs: Mendicote 10; Asts: Moody 4 Eff: Brito 24	Boxscore	Pts: Juanola 11; Rebs: Boix 6 Asts: Boix 2 Eff: Boix 13	Arena: Pazo Paco Paz; Referees: Jacobo Rial, Jaime Álvarez-Ossorio, Daniel López

22 October 2024	Club Ourense Baloncesto	119–79	CB Santfeliuenc	Ourense
18:00	Scoring by quarter: 20–19, 32–24, 29–18, 38–18
	Pts: Rodríguez 34; Rebs: Paz 11; Asts: López 8 Eff: Rodríguez 47	Boxscore	Pts: Saleh 14; Rebs: Saleh 9 Asts: Font 5 Eff: Saleh 17	Arena: Pazo Paco Paz; Referees: Jacobo Rial, Cristian Martín, Daniel López

22 October 2024	CB Prat	84–83	Homs UE Mataró	El Prat de Llobregat
19:00	Scoring by quarter: 18–19, 19–19, 26–15, 21–30
	Pts: Carreño 19; Rebs: Nogués 9 Asts: Peñarroya 6 Eff: Nogués 22	Boxscore	Pts: Viñallonga 18; Rebs: Baqués, Cánovas 5 Asts: Baqués 5 Eff: Viñallonga 16	Arena: Pavelló Joan Busquets; Referees: Jorge Baena, Eva Aresté, Pol Guadalajara

12 November 2024	Monbus Obradoiro	81–62	CB Prat	Santiago de Compostela
18:30	Scoring by quarter: 27–13, 16–17, 19–17, 19–15
	Pts: Leimanis 16; Rebs: Harguindey, Stević 5 Asts: Quintela 8 Eff: Quintela 19	Boxscore	Pts: Nogués 11; Rebs: Carreño, Ordóñez 6 Asts: Costa 4 Eff: Costa 14	Arena: Multiusos Fontes do Sar; Referees: Jacobo Rial, Alejandro Pellitero, Daniel López

12 November 2024	Homs UE Mataró	89–72	CB Santfeliuenc	Mataró
20:00	Scoring by quarter: 26–14, 26–9, 15–24, 22–25
	Pts: Juanola 16; Rebs: Jacdonmi 12; Asts: Boix 6 Eff: Jacdonmi 21	Boxscore	Pts: Planell 19; Rebs: Planell 8 Asts: Castellón 5 Eff: Planell 25	Arena: Josep Mora; Referees: Víctor Mas, Joan Fanes, Christian Ruiz

=== Group B ===
Pos	Team	Pld	W	L	PF	PA	PD	Pts	Qualification
1	Alimerka Oviedo Baloncesto	4	4	0	343	272	+71	8	Qualification to quarter-finals
2	Gipuzkoa Basket	4	2	2	334	316	+18	6 (Note: Tied on head-to-head points. Point difference in head-to-head matches: Gipuzkoa Basket +13, Grupo Alega Cantabria –5, Biele ISB –8.)	
3	Grupo Alega Cantabria	4	2	2	329	330	−1	6	
4	Biele ISB	4	2	2	303	308	−5	6	
5	Teknei Bizkaia Zornotza	4	0	4	263	346	−83	4	

Source: FEB
Notes:

7 September 2024	Gipuzkoa Basket	90–68	Biele ISB	Azkoitia
18:00	Scoring by quarter: 26–16, 21–18, 22–21, 21–13
	Pts: Díaz 18; Rebs: Sall 9 Asts: Díaz, Johnson 2 Eff: Díaz, Vrankić 13	Boxscore	Pts: Wallack 17; Rebs: Niang 9 Asts: Aizpitarte 3 Eff: Niang 19	Arena: Municipal; Referees: Asier Quintas, Imanol Diz, Alejandro López

7 September 2024	Grupo Alega Cantabria	66–94	Alimerka Oviedo Baloncesto	Torrelavega
19:00	Scoring by quarter: 10–24, 19–17, 16–23, 21–30
	Pts: Littleson 18; Rebs: Kabasele, Kande 6 Asts: Hundt 3 Eff: Littleson 12	Boxscore	Pts: West 15; Rebs: Cosialls 8 Asts: Duščak 5 Eff: Duščak 24	Arena: Vicente Trueba; Referees: Cristian Martín, Jesús Marcos Martínez, Diego Fernández

14 September 2024	Teknei Bizkaia Zornotza	62–80	Biele ISB	Amorebieta-Etxano
18:30	Scoring by quarter: 17–16, 10–18, 19–25, 16–21
	Pts: Ardanza 17; Rebs: Mazaira 10; Asts: Meana 7 Eff: Ardanza 18	Boxscore	Pts: Aizpitarte, Niang 15; Rebs: Niang 7 Asts: Aizpitarte 8 Eff: Stulic 23	Arena: Larrea; Referees: Andrea Alejo, Pablo Mirantes, Mikel Uriarte

14 September 2024	Grupo Alega Cantabria	94–85	Gipuzkoa Basket	Torrelavega
19:00	Scoring by quarter: 25–17, 28–18, 10–25, 31–25
	Pts: Rakočević 18; Rebs: Kande 8 Asts: Hundt 4 Eff: Rakočević, Vega 17	Boxscore	Pts: Vrankić 17; Rebs: Mokráň 6 Asts: Díaz 4 Eff: Vrankić 23	Arena: Vicente Trueba; Referees: Jorge Caamaño, Aitor Gómez, Manuel Berbeira

20 September 2024	Alimerka Oviedo Baloncesto	90–65	Gipuzkoa Basket	Oviedo
20:00	Scoring by quarter: 24–21, 20–19, 32–13, 14–12
	Pts: Hutchinson 17; Rebs: Cosialls 6 Asts: Valinotti 6 Eff: Cosialls 22	Boxscore	Pts: Ansorregi, Díaz 11; Rebs: Díaz, Zubizarreta 6 Asts: Zubizarreta 3 Eff: Zubizarreta 15	Arena: Municipal de Pumarín; Referees: Asier Quintas, Jesús Marcos Martínez, Romina Marchiano

21 September 2024	Teknei Bizkaia Zornotza	66–98	Grupo Alega Cantabria	Amorebieta-Etxano
18:30	Scoring by quarter: 9–18, 17–18, 22–35, 18–27
	Pts: Mazaira, Taboada 17; Rebs: Taboada 7 Asts: Meana 6 Eff: Taboada 18	Boxscore	Pts: Littleson 27; Rebs: Kande 9 Asts: Bulić, Martínez 4 Eff: Kande 29	Arena: Larrea; Referees: Jorge Caamaño, Sergio del Val, Rodrigo Gallego

22 October 2024	Gipuzkoa Basket	94–64	Teknei Bizkaia Zornotza	Amorebieta-Etxano
19:30	Scoring by quarter: 24–11, 27–17, 18–18, 25–18
	Pts: Díaz, Johnson 17; Rebs: Martínez 11; Asts: Díaz 4 Eff: Johnson 16	Boxscore	Pts: Mazaira 11; Rebs: Thiam 8 Asts: Albisu 5 Eff: Mendía 11	Arena: Larrea; Referees: Imanol Diz, Andrea Alejo, Pablo Mirantes

22 October 2024	Biele ISB	70–85	Alimerka Oviedo Baloncesto	Azpeitia
20:00	Scoring by quarter: 16–24, 18–13, 18–29, 18–19
	Pts: Aizpitarte 15; Rebs: Aizpitarte 7 Asts: Aizpitarte 5 Eff: Aizpitarte 20	Boxscore	Pts: Duščak 18; Rebs: Nweke 7 Asts: Amarante 3 Eff: Duščak 17	Arena: Municipal; Referees: Asier Quintas, Aitor Gómez, Manuel Berbeira

12 November 2024	Alimerka Oviedo Baloncesto	74–71	Teknei Bizkaia Zornotza	Oviedo
20:00	Scoring by quarter: 25–19, 15–17, 15–18, 19–17
	Pts: Duščak 14; Rebs: Hutchinson 6 Asts: Duščak 3 Eff: Duščak 16	Boxscore	Pts: Ardanza 15; Rebs: Meana 8 Asts: Albisu, Meana 5 Eff: Meana 22	Arena: Municipal de Pumarín; Referees: Jesús Marcos Martínez, Francisco González, Diego Fernández

12 November 2024	Biele ISB	85–71	Grupo Alega Cantabria	Azpeitia
20:00	Scoring by quarter: 17–17, 27–18, 18–20, 23–16
	Pts: Aizpitarte 19; Rebs: Niang 8 Asts: Herasme, Inda 4 Eff: Aizpitarte 19	Boxscore	Pts: Hundt, Martínez 11; Rebs: Kabasele 6 Asts: Bulić 3 Eff: Kande 11	Arena: Municipal de Azpeitia; Referees: Asier Quintas, Imanol Diz, Andrea Alejo

=== Group C ===
Pos	Team	Pld	W	L	PF	PA	PD	Pts	Qualification
1	UEMC Real Valladolid Baloncesto	4	3	1	329	278	+51	7 (Note: Tied on head-to-head points. Point difference in head-to-head matches: UEMC Real Valladolid Baloncesto: +7, Caja Rural CB Zamora –2, Súper Agropal Palencia –5.)	Qualification to quarter-finals
2	Caja Rural CB Zamora	4	3	1	357	315	+42	7	
3	Súper Agropal Palencia	4	3	1	355	303	+52	7	
4	Clínica Ponferrada SDP	4	1	3	281	333	−52	5	
5	Gran Canaria B	4	0	4	256	349	−93	4	

Source: FEB
Notes:

7 September 2024	Clínica Ponferrada SDP	72–104	Caja Rural CB Zamora	Ponferrada
18:15	Scoring by quarter: 24–32, 25–31, 18–18, 5–23
	Pts: three players 12; Rebs: five players 3 Asts: Moncanut 5 Eff: Blak 16	Boxscore	Pts: Buckingham, Walker 16; Rebs: Hearst 8 Asts: Walker 5 Eff: Nikić 21	Arena: Pabellón Lydia Valentín; Referees: Paula Lema, Juan Gabriel Carpallo, Romina Marchiano

7 September 2024	UEMC Real Valladolid Baloncesto	88–80	Palencia Baloncesto	Valladolid
19:00	Scoring by quarter: 18–24, 18–17, 25–19, 27–20
	Pts: Hoover 16; Rebs: Wilson 5 Asts: Atencia 5 Eff: Hoover 18	Boxscore	Pts: Vaulet 12; Rebs: Vaulet 6 Asts: Krutwig 4 Eff: Vaulet 19	Arena: Polideportivo Pisuerga; Referees: Rodrigo Palanca, Manuel Andrés Seijo, Israel Chacón

12 September 2024	Gran Canaria B	45–84	UEMC Real Valladolid Baloncesto	Las Palmas
21:30	Scoring by quarter: 8–21, 10–25, 16–13, 11–25
	Pts: Heinonen 11; Rebs: Diop, Schott 5 Asts: Maniema 5 Eff: Pérez, Schott 10	Boxscore	Pts: Kovačevič 14; Rebs: Wilson 10; Asts: Sans 5 Eff: Wilson 21	Arena: Vega de San José; Referees: Nicolás Murillo, Mikel Wiot, Aldo Rodríguez

18 September 2024	Caja Rural CB Zamora	86–89	Palencia Baloncesto	Zamora
20:00	Scoring by quarter: 20–23, 25–19, 17–27, 24–20
	Pts: Walker 19; Rebs: Buckingham 7 Asts: Hearst 4 Eff: Buckingham 19	Boxscore	Pts: Kunkel 18; Rebs: Krutwig 5 Asts: Wintering 4 Eff: Krutwig 22	Arena: Ángel Nieto; Referees: Juan Carpallo, Asunción Langa, Alberto García

21 September 2024	Palencia Baloncesto	103–68	Gran Canaria B	Palencia
19:00	Scoring by quarter: 27–13, 25–24, 22–18, 29–13
	Pts: Vaulet 23; Rebs: Krutwig 9 Asts: Oroz 7 Eff: Vaulet 27	Boxscore	Pts: Diop 18; Rebs: Miteo 8 Asts: Heinonen 3 Eff: Diop 24	Arena: Municipal de Deportes; Referees: Rodrigo Palanca, Juan Alberto Pinela, María Muñoz

21 September 2024	Clínica Ponferrada SDP	67–72	UEMC Real Valladolid Baloncesto	Ponferrada
19:30	Scoring by quarter: 12–15, 20–27, 22–11, 13–19
	Pts: Blak 17; Rebs: Blak, Hierrezuelo 6 Asts: Moncanut 3 Eff: Blak 19	Boxscore	Pts: Hoover 13; Rebs: Vučetić 8 Asts: Manchón 3 Eff: Vučetić 17	Arena: Pabellón Lydia Valentín; Referees: Ángel de Lucas, Eduard Montiel, Estíbaliz Rubio

22 October 2024	UEMC Real Valladolid Baloncesto	85–86	Caja Rural CB Zamora	Valladolid
20:45	Scoring by quarter: 24–21, 24–19, 26–23, 11–23
	Pts: Atencia 19; Rebs: Egekeze 6 Asts: Puidet 5 Eff: Rozītis 22	Boxscore	Pts: Buckingham, Hanzlík 15; Rebs: Buckingham 10; Asts: Naspler 4 Eff: Buckingham 24	Arena: Polideportivo Pisuerga; Referees: Fernando Ibañez, Laura Piñeiro, Eduard Montiel

23 October 2024	Gran Canaria B	74–81	Clínica Ponferrada SDP	Las Palmas
20:30	Scoring by quarter: 27–10, 10–26, 19–19, 18–26
	Pts: Diop 19; Rebs: Diop 9 Asts: Bordón, Maniema 3 Eff: Diop 27	Boxscore	Pts: Herrera 14; Rebs: Merlo 12; Asts: Merlo 3 Eff: Merlo 23	Arena: Vega de San José; Referees: Héctor Báez, Julio Rijo, Juan Antonio Molina

12 November 2024	Caja Rural CB Zamora	81–69	Gran Canaria B	Zamora
19:30	Scoring by quarter: 17–18, 23–21, 19–10, 22–20
	Pts: Buckingham 21; Rebs: Buckingham 8 Asts: Naspler 5 Eff: Buckingham 21	Boxscore	Pts: Maniema 13; Rebs: Schott 13; Asts: Heinonen 3 Eff: Miteo 20	Arena: Pabellón Ángel Nieto; Referees: Jorge Caamaño, Alejandro Calvo, Laura Piñeiro

12 November 2024	Súper Agropal Palencia	83–61	Clínica Ponferrada SDP	Palencia
20:30	Scoring by quarter: 12–10, 27–18, 23–13, 21–20
	Pts: Krutwig 14; Rebs: Krutwig 9 Asts: Wintering 4 Eff: Krutwig 20	Boxscore	Pts: Herrera 17; Rebs: Samar 6 Asts: Merlo 5 Eff: Herrera 16	Arena: Pabellón Municipal de Deportes; Referees: Cristian Martín, Israel Chacón, Encarnación Hernández

=== Group D ===
Pos	Team	Pld	W	L	PF	PA	PD	Pts	Qualification
1	Silbö San Pablo Burgos	4	4	0	410	287	+123	8	Qualification to quarter-finals
2	Grupo Ureta Tizona Burgos	4	3	1	386	307	+79	7	
3	Rioverde Clavijo	4	2	2	320	385	−65	6	
4	OCA Global CB Salou	4	1	3	270	348	−78	5	
5	Lobe Huesca La Magia	4	0	4	309	368	−59	4	

Source: FEB

7 September 2024	Lobe Huesca La Magia	83–101	Rioverde Clavijo	Monzón
19:00	Scoring by quarter: 17–20, 20–29, 25–23, 21–29
	Pts: Bracey 16; Rebs: Iglesias 7 Asts: Rubín de Celis 5 Eff: Iglesias 18	Boxscore	Pts: Ayesa 26; Rebs: Orlov 8 Asts: de Pablo 5 Eff: Ayesa 26	Arena: Los Olímpicos; Referees: Daniel Checa, Fernando Martínez, Elena Espiau

8 September 2024	Silbö San Pablo Burgos	111–91	Grupo Ureta Tizona Burgos	Burgos
19:00	Scoring by quarter: 26–16, 32–27, 30–27, 23–21
	Pts: Díez 20; Rebs: Fischer 13; Asts: Corbalán, Cremo 6 Eff: Fischer 30	Boxscore	Pts: Jones 20; Rebs: Vila 4 Asts: Jones 3 Eff: Jones 18	Arena: Coliseum Burgos; Attendance: 6,569; Referees: Ángel de Lucas, Pablo Rodríguez, Alejandro Calvo

12 September 2024	Grupo Ureta Tizona Burgos	115–76	Rioverde Clavijo	Burgos
20:45	Scoring by quarter: 31–23, 31–12, 22–16, 31–25
	Pts: Vila 20; Rebs: Thiam 7 Asts: Pacheco 3 Eff: Vila 25	Boxscore	Pts: Ayesa 12; Rebs: three players 4 Asts: Moreno 2 Eff: Arbosa, Savkov 10	Arena: Polideportivo El Plantío; Referees: Cristina Adán, Jesús Fernández, Encarna Hernández

18 September 2024	Silbö San Pablo Burgos	95–63	OCA Global CB Salou	Burgos
20:30	Scoring by quarter: 29–12, 18–18, 28–11, 20–22
	Pts: Corbalán 16; Rebs: Díez 6 Asts: Cremo 5 Eff: Cremo, Golomán 20	Boxscore	Pts: Montero 18; Rebs: Santana 4 Asts: Montero 2 Eff: Montero 11	Arena: Coliseum Burgos; Attendance: 4,026; Referees: Rodrigo Palanca, Jesús Marín, Isidoro Sánchez

21 September 2024	Lobe Huesca La Magia	74–98	Silbö San Pablo Burgos	Burgos
19:00	Scoring by quarter: 24–17, 22–27, 11–24, 17–30
	Pts: Bracey, Figueroa 12; Rebs: Abdulsalam 6 Asts: Bracey 3 Eff: Figueroa 16	Boxscore	Pts: Corbalán 18; Rebs: Díez 8 Asts: Cremo 3 Eff: Corbalán 22	Arena: Coliseum Burgos; Attendance: 3,980; Referees: Antonio Zamora, Alejandro Benavente, Andrés Miguel

22 September 2024	OCA Global CB Salou	42–95	Grupo Ureta Tizona Burgos	Salou
18:15	Scoring by quarter: 9–25, 8–22, 18–25, 7–23
	Pts: Montero 13; Rebs: Aragonès 7 Asts: Aragonès 3 Eff: Montero 14	Boxscore	Pts: Lobo 19; Rebs: Al. Alonso 6 Asts: Ay. Alonso 5 Eff: Soluade 19	Arena: Centre Salou; Referees: Javier Ávila, Julio Rijo, Juan Antonio Molina

22 October 2024	OCA Global CB Salou	84–74	Lobe Huesca La Magia	Salou
19:30	Scoring by quarter: 20–17, 20–27, 11–12, 33–18
	Pts: Montero 16; Rebs: Aragonès 7 Asts: Moure 7 Eff: Aragonès 18	Boxscore	Pts: Figueroa, Knowles 15; Rebs: Shelist 7 Asts: Figueroa, Gómez 3 Eff: Figueroa 15	Arena: Centre Salou; Referees: Sandra Sánchez, Jesús Marín, Abraham Hormigo

22 October 2024	Rioverde Clavijo	59–106	Silbö San Pablo Burgos	Logroño
20:00	Scoring by quarter: 21–28, 10–32, 15–20, 13–26
	Pts: Savkov 9 Rebs: Faye 7 Asts: Moreno, Querejeta 4 Eff: Savkov 12	Boxscore	Pts: Díez, Stumbris 18; Rebs: Corbalán 8 Asts: Cuevas, Guðmundsson 6 Eff: Díez 29	Arena: Palacio de los Deportes; Referees: Juan Pedro Morales, Jorge Caamaño, Alexis Fuentes

12 November 2024	Rioverde Clavijo	84–81	OCA Global CB Salou	Logroño
20:00	Scoring by quarter: 24–24, 17–14, 24–34, 19–19
	Pts: Faye 18; Rebs: Faye 11; Asts: Querejeta 4 Eff: Faye 29	Boxscore	Pts: Bieshaar 16; Rebs: Aragonès, Santana 7 Asts: Aguilar 12; Eff: Aguilar 21	Arena: Palacio de los Deportes; Referees: Daniel Checa, Fernando Martínez, Jesús Marín

12 November 2024	Grupo Ureta Tizona Burgos	85–78	Lobe Huesca La Magia	Burgos
20:30	Scoring by quarter: 29–23, 22–17, 21–20, 13–18
	Pts: Thiam 16; Rebs: Thiam 7 Asts: three players 3 Eff: Thiam 22	Boxscore	Pts: Vázquez 21; Rebs: Shelist 7 Asts: Gómez 3 Eff: Vázquez 24	Arena: Polideportivo El Plantío; Referees: Juan Pedro Morales, Rodrigo Palanca, Guillermo García

=== Group E ===
Pos	Team	Pld	W	L	PF	PA	PD	Pts	Qualification
1	Movistar Estudiantes	4	4	0	386	276	+110	8	Qualification to quarter-finals
2	Flexicar Fuenlabrada	4	3	1	357	337	+20	7	
3	Cáceres Patrimonio de la Humanidad	4	2	2	310	309	+1	6	
4	La Salud Archena	4	1	3	314	323	−9	5	
5	Bueno Arenas Albacete Basket	4	0	4	242	364	−122	4	

Source: FEB

7 September 2024	La Salud Archena	69–107	Movistar Estudiantes	Archena
19:00	Scoring by quarter: 21–35, 17–23, 17–22, 14–27
	Pts: Hurtado 13; Rebs: Lafuente 7 Asts: Lafuente 7 Eff: Mendiola 13	Boxscore	Pts: Schmidt 22; Rebs: Kravić 10; Asts: Granger 8 Eff: Barro 26	Arena: Joaquín López Fontes; Referees: Enrique López, Mikel Cañigueral, Gerardo Bernabéu

8 September 2024	Bueno Arenas Albacete Basket	69–95	Baloncesto Fuenlabrada	Albacete
19:00	Scoring by quarter: 17–23, 16–24, 26–16, 10–32
	Pts: Harris 14; Rebs: Stevanić 6 Asts: three players 2 Eff: Harris 19	Boxscore	Pts: Nwogbo 15; Rebs: Bilbao 8 Asts: Westermann 3 Eff: Nwogbo 22	Arena: El Parque; Referees: Jaime Gómez, Fernando Ibáñez, Diego Amores

15 September 2024	Movistar Estudiantes	94–76	Flexicar Fuenlabrada	Madrid
18:30	Scoring by quarter: 17–23, 12–23, 39–16, 26–14
	Pts: Garino 17; Rebs: Barro 5 Asts: Díaz 6 Eff: Díaz 17	Boxscore	Pts: McGrew, Munnings 17; Rebs: Munnings 5 Asts: Zurbriggen 6 Eff: McGrew 23	Arena: Movistar Academy Magariños; Referees: Ángel Albacete, Pablo Rodríguez, Carlos Gallego

15 September 2024	Bueno Arenas Albacete Basket	68–72(OT)	Cáceres Patrimonio de la Humanidad	Albacete
19:30	Scoring by quarter: 7–16, 20–18, 12–20, 27–12, Overtime: 2–6
	Pts: de Blas 15; Rebs: de Blas, Fall 7 Asts: Harris, Sima 4 Eff: Fall 21	Boxscore	Pts: Sá 15; Rebs: García 10; Asts: Rodríguez 6 Eff: García 19	Arena: El Parque; Referees: Carlos García, Sara Peláez, Yoel Canales

20 September 2024	Cáceres Patrimonio de la Humanidad	73–82	Movistar Estudiantes	Cáceres
20:45	Scoring by quarter: 16–19, 20–20, 11–24, 26–19
	Pts: Black 21; Rebs: Gatell 7 Asts: Alvarado 4 Eff: Black 19	Boxscore	Pts: Alonso 15; Rebs: Andrić 5 Asts: Schmidt 5 Eff: Schmidt 19	Arena: Multiusos Ciudad de Cáceres; Referees: José Marqueta, Sergio Acevedo, Alejandro Gómez

21 September 2024	Baloncesto Fuenlabrada	94–84	La Salud Archena	Fuenlabrada
20:45	Scoring by quarter: 27–23, 27–16, 18–23, 22–22
	Pts: Jorgensen 18; Rebs: Nwogbo 8 Asts: Westermann, Zurbriggen 3 Eff: Jorgensen 20	Boxscore	Pts: Mendiola 24; Rebs: Mendiola 13; Asts: Lafuente 5 Eff: Mendiola 38	Arena: Fernando Martín; Referees: Ariadna Chueca, Rodrigo Garvín, Alejandro Rubio

22 October 2024	Movistar Estudiantes	103–58	Bueno Arenas Albacete Basket	Madrid
20:30	Scoring by quarter: 32–9, 22–15, 27–18, 22–16
	Pts: Alonso 28; Rebs: Kravić 8 Asts: Montero 5 Eff: Alonso 33	Boxscore	Pts: Fall 12; Rebs: Kulishenko 6 Asts: Harris, Val 4 Eff: Fall 17	Arena: Movistar Academy Magariños; Referees: Cristina Adán, Alberto García, Jesús Fernández

22 October 2024	Cáceres Patrimonio de la Humanidad	75–67	La Salud Archena	Cáceres
20:45	Scoring by quarter: 20–13, 19–13, 19–25, 17–16
	Pts: Black 15; Rebs: Salas 9 Asts: Alvarado 4 Eff: Alvarado 16	Boxscore	Pts: Montero 14; Rebs: Flores 9 Asts: Tendero 3 Eff: Flores 22	Arena: Multiusos Ciudad de Cáceres; Referees: Jaime Gómez, José María Arresa, Sergio Acevedo

12 November 2024	La Salud Archena	94–47	Bueno Arenas Albacete Basket	Archena
19:00	Scoring by quarter: 18–12, 21–16, 22–8, 33–11
	Pts: Martínez 14; Rebs: Hernández 9 Asts: Strikker 4 Eff: Hernández 23	Boxscore	Pts: Guerrero 9 Rebs: Val 7 Asts: Val 3 Eff: Val 14	Arena: Pabellón Joaquín López Fontes; Referees: Fernando Ibáñez, Francisco Olmos, Alejandro Climent

12 November 2024	Flexicar Fuenlabrada	92–90(OT)	Cáceres Patrimonio de la Humanidad	Fuenlabrada
20:30	Scoring by quarter: 22–31, 17–13, 19–20, 23–17, Overtime: 11–9
	Pts: Jorgensen 16; Rebs: Bilbao 11; Asts: Durán 10; Eff: Nzosa 22	Boxscore	Pts: Kalinicenko 22; Rebs: Sá, Salas 4 Asts: Alvarado 9 Eff: Kalinicenko 17	Arena: Fernando Martín; Referees: Ángel de Lucas, Ángel Albacete, Asunción Langa

=== Group F ===
Pos	Team	Pld	W	L	PF	PA	PD	Pts	Qualification
1	Real Betis Baloncesto	4	4	0	310	228	+82	8	Qualification to quarter-finals
2	Melilla Ciudad del Deporte	4	2	2	307	307	0	6 (Note: Head-to-head result: CB Naturavia Morón 89–94 Melilla Ciudad del Deporte)	
3	CB Naturavia Morón	4	2	2	299	295	+4	6	
4	Damex UDEA Algeciras	4	1	3	252	294	−42	5 (Note: Head-to-head result: Damex UDEA Algeciras 80–70 Ciudad de Huelva)	
5	Ciudad de Huelva	4	1	3	291	335	−44	5	

Source: FEB
Notes:

6 September 2024	Melilla Ciudad del Deporte	57–74	Real Betis Baloncesto	Melilla
19:00	Scoring by quarter: 11–17, 13–20, 11–17, 22–20
	Pts: García, Godspower 11; Rebs: three players 5 Asts: García 4 Eff: García 17	Boxscore	Pts: Hughes 16; Rebs: Radončić 8 Asts: Benite, Renfroe 4 Eff: Radončić 17	Arena: Javier Imbroda Ortiz; Referees: Javier Ávila, José Carlos Sierra, Javier Almansa

8 September 2024	CB Naturavia Morón	87–67	Ciudad de Huelva	Morón de la Frontera
13:00	Scoring by quarter: 29–17, 17–7, 23–18, 18–25
	Pts: Parejo 16; Rebs: Kouadio, Tamba; Asts: Marín 6 Eff: Parejo 21	Boxscore	Pts: Chabi Yo 12; Rebs: Barandalla, Niang 5 Asts: Ortiz 4 Eff: Chabi Yo, Niang 11	Arena: Alameda; Referees: Jorge Muñoz, Daniel Cotta, Antonio Miguel Castillo

14 September 2024	Melilla Ciudad del Deporte	77–52	Damex UDEA Algeciras	Melilla
20:00	Scoring by quarter: 12–8, 17–13, 25–14, 23–17
	Pts: Alley 13; Rebs: Godspower 9 Asts: García 5 Eff: García 20	Boxscore	Pts: Corraliza 12; Rebs: Efambé 11; Asts: Òrrit 2 Eff: Efambé 12	Arena: Javier Imbroda Ortiz; Referees: Juan Ramón Hurtado, Samuel Aranda, Salvador Patricio

15 September 2024	Real Betis Baloncesto	70–53	CB Naturavia Morón	Seville
12:00	Scoring by quarter: 13–16, 23–11, 14–14, 20–12
	Pts: Cvetković 21; Rebs: Radončić 13; Asts: Benite, Radončić 4 Eff: Cvetković 21	Boxscore	Pts: Kouadio 14; Rebs: Kouadio 8 Asts: Marín 4 Eff: Kouadio 14	Arena: San Pablo; Referees: Héctor Báez, Joaquín Lizana, Carlos Betanzos

21 September 2024	Ciudad de Huelva	62–89	Real Betis Baloncesto	Huelva
19:30	Scoring by quarter: 13–23, 15–23, 19–18, 15–25
	Pts: Barandalla, Chabi Yo 12; Rebs: Diene 9 Asts: Maiza, Ortiz 4 Eff: Diene 16	Boxscore	Pts: Radončić 16; Rebs: three players 6 Asts: Renfroe 6 Eff: Hughes, Renfroe 21	Arena: Carolina Marín; Referees: José María Arresa, Raúl Aguilera, Milkana Borges

22 September 2024	Damex UDEA Algeciras	64–70	CB Naturavia Morón	Algeciras
12:00	Scoring by quarter: 21–21, 20–19, 8–17, 15–13
	Pts: Òrrit 14; Rebs: Eleraky 8 Asts: Corraliza 4 Eff: Òrrit 21	Boxscore	Pts: Parejo 20; Rebs: Jiménez, Kouadio 6 Asts: Jiménez, Mack 2 Eff: Parejo 18	Arena: Doctor Juan Carlos Mateo; Referees: Jorge Muñoz, Juan Jesús Betanzos, Juan Antonio Expósito

22 October 2024	CB Naturavia Morón	89–94	Melilla Ciudad del Deporte	Morón de la Frontera
20:30	Scoring by quarter: 14–25, 24–20, 23–23, 28–26
	Pts: Kouadio 22; Rebs: Kouadio 10; Asts: Kouadio 3 Eff: Kouadio 35	Boxscore	Pts: Godspower 22; Rebs: Jacobs, Pavlov 7 Asts: García 8 Eff: Godspower 21	Arena: Alameda; Referees: Juan Ramón Hurtado, José Javier Marqueta, Juan Jesús Betanzos

22 October 2024	Damex UDEA Algeciras	80–70	Ciudad de Huelva	Algeciras
20:30	Scoring by quarter: 21–16, 22–14, 17–25, 20–15
	Pts: González 20; Rebs: Efambé 8 Asts: González, Òrrit 5 Eff: Efambé, González 20	Boxscore	Pts: Chabi Yo 12; Rebs: Diene 11; Asts: Treviño 3 Eff: Diene 16	Arena: Doctor Juan Carlos Mateo; Referees: Germán Morales, Joaquín Lizana, Elías Calvillo

12 November 2024	Ciudad de Huelva	92–79	Melilla Ciudad del Deporte	Huelva
19:30	Scoring by quarter: 23–16, 17–25, 32–13, 20–25
	Pts: Diene 18; Rebs: Diene 7 Asts: Mays 4 Eff: Diene 26	Boxscore	Pts: Córdoba 15; Rebs: Godspower 8 Asts: Pavlov 4 Eff: Córdoba 15	Arena: Palacio de Deportes Carolina Marín; Referees: Germán Morales, Enrique López, Carlos Betanzos

12 November 2024	Real Betis Baloncesto	77–56	Damex UDEA Algeciras	Seville
20:00	Scoring by quarter: 13–11, 28–15, 21–16, 15–14
	Pts: Benite 17; Rebs: Radončić 14; Asts: Cvetković 7 Eff: Benite 16	Boxscore	Pts: Vucica 13; Rebs: Ikepze 7 Asts: Corraliza 3 Eff: Vucica 11	Arena: San Pablo; Referees: Jorge Muñoz, José Javier Marqueta, Elías Calvillo

=== Group G ===
Pos	Team	Pld	W	L	PF	PA	PD	Pts	Qualification
1	Amics Castelló	4	4	0	356	293	+63	8	Qualification to quarter-finals
2	Palmer Basket Mallorca Palma	4	2	2	292	319	−27	6 (Note: Head-to-head result: Hestia Menorca 65–68 Palmer Basket Mallorca Palma)	
3	Hestia Menorca	4	2	2	289	288	+1	6	
4	Fibwi Palma	4	1	3	296	314	−18	5 (Note: Head-to-head result: Fibwi Palma 79–69 Maderas Sorlí Benicarló)	
5	Maderas Sorlí Benicarló	4	1	3	300	319	−19	5	

Source: FEB
Notes:

8 September 2024	Palmer Basket Mallorca Palma	69–94	Amics Castelló	Palma
12:00	Scoring by quarter: 17–29, 20–21, 16–17, 16–27
	Pts: Scariolo 14; Rebs: Niang 8 Asts: Chapela 5 Eff: Feliu 14	Boxscore	Pts: Minlend Jr. 28; Rebs: Ngom 7 Asts: Faner, Tate 5 Eff: Minlend Jr. 33	Arena: Son Moix; Referees: Eva Aresté, Miquel Remisa, Marc Ruiz

8 September 2024	Fibwi Palma	64–79	Hestia Menorca	Palma
18:00	Scoring by quarter: 13–14, 21–26, 15–22, 15–17
	Pts: Miller Jr. 14; Rebs: Aramburu, Correia 6 Asts: Pedro 3 Eff: Aramburu 18	Boxscore	Pts: Luković 15; Rebs: three players 4 Asts: Figueras 5 Eff: Gómez 21	Arena: Son Moix; Referees: Jorge Baena, Antonio Zamora, Joan Fanés

15 September 2024	Amics Castelló	81–74	Fibwi Palma	Castellón de la Plana
12:00	Scoring by quarter: 19–22, 19–15, 21–23, 22–14
	Pts: Tate 13; Rebs: Adala 10; Asts: Faner 9 Eff: Etxeguren 16	Boxscore	Pts: Long 20; Rebs: Beraza 8 Asts: Miller Jr. 5 Eff: Long 15	Arena: Ciutat de Castelló; Referees: Francisco José Zafra, Guillermo García, Rubén Argüelles

15 September 2024	Maderas Sorlí Benicarló	81–70	Palmer Basket Mallorca Palma	Benicarló
17:30	Scoring by quarter: 24–16, 18–22, 15–15, 24–17
	Pts: Ruesga 16; Rebs: Lafuente 7 Asts: Libroia 5 Eff: Ruesga 23	Boxscore	Pts: Urdiain 15; Rebs: Enabulele 10; Asts: Chapela 5 Eff: Enabulele 19	Arena: Pavelló Poliesportiu Municipal; Referees: Alberto Lázaro, Marc García, Abraham Hormigo

20 September 2024	Hestia Menorca	71–85	Amics Castelló	Mahón
21:00	Scoring by quarter: 14–20, 11–20, 24–30, 22–15
	Pts: Ivanov 21; Rebs: Tanoh 6 Asts: three players 2 Eff: Tanoh 14	Boxscore	Pts: Martínez 15; Rebs: Martínez 8 Asts: Faner 3 Eff: Minlend Jr. 21	Arena: Pavelló Menorca; Referees: Leandro Lezcano, Xavier Girbal, Pol Guadalajara

22 September 2024	Fibwi Palma	79–69	Maderas Sorlí Benicarló	Palma
18:00	Scoring by quarter: 22–16, 17–17, 18–17, 22–19
	Pts: Long 24; Rebs: Santos 7 Asts: Martínez 5 Eff: Long 22	Boxscore	Pts: Ruesga 13; Rebs: Lafuente 10; Asts: Lafuente 6 Eff: Haro, Lafuente 15	Arena: Son Moix; Referees: Ángel Albacete, Mikel Cañigueral, Alejandro Climent

22 October 2024	Maderas Sorlí Benicarló	71–74	Hestia Menorca	Benicarló
20:00	Scoring by quarter: 21–19, 13–24, 16–17, 21–14
	Pts: Ruesga 20; Rebs: López 5 Asts: Lafuente 6 Eff: Ruesga 25	Boxscore	Pts: Molins 17; Rebs: Stoilov 9 Asts: Falk 5 Eff: Stoilov 19	Arena: Pavelló Poliesportiu Municipal; Referees: Antonio Zamora, María Cortés, Alejandro Climent

6 November 2024	Palmer Basket Mallorca Palma	85–79(OT)	Fibwi Palma	Palma
20:00	Scoring by quarter: 17–21, 17–25, 18–12, 20–14, Overtime: 13–7
	Pts: Easley 28; Rebs: Enabulele 5 Asts: Scariolo 5 Eff: Easley 24	Boxscore	Pts: Miller Jr. 21; Rebs: Martínez, Pedro 7 Asts: Martínez 4 Eff: Miller Jr. 21	Arena: Son Moix; Referees: Sara Peláez, Cristian García, Alejandro Climent

12 November 2024	Hestia Menorca	65–68	Palmer Basket Mallorca Palma	Mahón
20:30	Scoring by quarter: 7–17, 16–18, 23–21, 19–12
	Pts: Ivanov 18; Rebs: Dike 8 Asts: Figueras 5 Eff: Dike 16	Boxscore	Pts: Easley 14; Rebs: Feliu 7 Asts: Scariolo 4 Eff: Easley 15	Arena: Pavelló Menorca; Referees: Sandra Sánchez, Josep Lluís Presseguer, Bernat Verdejo

12 November 2024	Amics Castelló	96–79	Maderas Sorlí Benicarló	Castellón de la Plana
20:45	Scoring by quarter: 27–29, 28–10, 20–24, 21–16
	Pts: Menéndez 12; Rebs: Menéndez 10; Asts: Arcos 6 Eff: Menéndez 20	Boxscore	Pts: Suárez 19; Rebs: Lafuente 8 Asts: Sabaté 5 Eff: Lafuente 16	Arena: Pabellón Municipal Ciutat de Castelló; Referees: Francisco José Zafra, Daniel Cervantes, Cristian García

=== Group H ===
Pos	Team	Pld	W	L	PF	PA	PD	Pts	Qualification
1	ODILO FC Cartagena CB	4	4	0	373	274	+99	8	Qualification to quarter-finals
2	HLA Alicante	4	3	1	308	290	+18	7	
3	Class Bàsquet San Antoni	4	2	2	307	307	0	6	
4	Nadunet Refitel Bàsquet Llíria	4	1	3	275	341	−66	5	
5	CB L'Horta Godella	4	0	4	263	314	−51	4	

Source: FEB

7 September 2024	HLA Alicante	76–69	Class Bàsquet San Antoni	Alicante
18:00	Scoring by quarter: 21–12, 31–23, 7–12, 17–22
	Pts: King 21; Rebs: Bressan 9 Asts: King, Larsen 5 Eff: King 28	Boxscore	Pts: Gantt 14; Rebs: de la Rúa 7 Asts: de la Rúa 7 Eff: de la Rúa 21	Arena: Pedro Ferrándiz; Referees: Francisco José Zafra, Fran Olmos, José Sánchez

7 September 2024	Nadunet Refitel Bàsquet Llíria	65–99	ODILO FC Cartagena CB	Llíria
18:30	Scoring by quarter: 13–27, 20–30, 13–20, 19–22
	Pts: Clement 14; Rebs: Osarenren 8 Asts: Montilla, Salomon 4 Eff: Kandulu 17	Boxscore	Pts: van Eyck 14; Rebs: van Eyck 8 Asts: Blat 7 Eff: Blat, van Eyck 20	Arena: Pla del Arc; Referees: Héctor Báez, Jordi Domingo, Sara Pastrana

14 September 2024	CB L'Horta Godella	67–70	Class Bàsquet San Antoni	Godella
17:30	Scoring by quarter: 11–17, 21–19, 20–19, 15–15
	Pts: Copes 18; Rebs: Baptiste 7 Asts: Clarke, Ortega 5 Eff: Copes 17	Boxscore	Pts: Peris 13; Rebs: Taiwo 13; Asts: de la Rúa 7 Eff: de la Rúa 19	Arena: Municipal; Referees: Leandro Lezcano, Óscar Navarro, Juan Sánchez

14 September 2024	HLA Alicante	86–72	Nadunet Refitel Bàsquet Llíria	Alicante
19:00	Scoring by quarter: 24–11, 19–23, 24–15, 19–23
	Pts: King 24; Rebs: Rodríguez 9 Asts: King, Larsen 4 Eff: King 25	Boxscore	Pts: Pérez 15; Rebs: Osarenren 12; Asts: three players 4 Eff: Osarenren 18	Arena: Pedro Ferrándiz; Referees: Daniel Checa, Javier Villanueva, Roger Pinyol

21 September 2024	Nadunet Refitel Bàsquet Llíria	64–63(OT)	CB L'Horta Godella	Llíria
18:30	Scoring by quarter: 16–14, 15–15, 20–15, 9–16, Overtime: 4–3
	Pts: Pérez 21; Rebs: Kandulu 16; Asts: Rivas 4 Eff: Kandulu 19	Boxscore	Pts: Marí 23; Rebs: Vila 9 Asts: Marí 6 Eff: Marí 24	Arena: Pla del Arc; Referees: Paula Lema, Kunal Melwani, Álvaro Martín

21 September 2024	ODILO FC Cartagena CB	82–68	HLA Alicante	Cartagena
19:00	Scoring by quarter: 21–12, 17–23, 19–14, 25–19
	Pts: Jordá 16; Rebs: four players 4 Asts: van Eyck 6 Eff: van Eyck 16	Boxscore	Pts: López 16; Rebs: Rodríguez 6 Asts: Larsen 4 Eff: Bressan 16	Arena: Palacio de Deportes; Referees: Enrique López, Francisco Olmos, Jesús Novillo

22 October 2024	Class Bàsquet San Antoni	75–90	ODILO FC Cartagena CB	Sant Antoni de Portmany
19:30	Scoring by quarter: 14–18, 18–30, 23–16, 20–26
	Pts: Peris 27; Rebs: de la Rúa, Llamas 6 Asts: de la Rúa, Peris 2 Eff: Peris 25	Boxscore	Pts: Garuba 15; Rebs: Blat, van Eyck 6 Asts: Blat 4 Eff: Garuba 20	Arena: Sa Pedrera; Referees: Josep María Olivares, Alejandro López, Christian Ruiz

22 October 2024	CB L'Horta Godella	67–78	HLA Alicante	Godella
20:45	Scoring by quarter: 16–20, 20–22, 8–17, 23–19
	Pts: Bellver, Clarke 13; Rebs: Copes, Iglesias 6 Asts: Clarke 5 Eff: Jean-Baptiste 18	Boxscore	Pts: Rivas 17; Rebs: Moute a Bidias 7 Asts: Rodríguez 4 Eff: Rivas 20	Arena: Municipal; Referees: Héctor Sanhermelando, Jordi Domingo, Salvador Patricio

12 November 2024	ODILO FC Cartagena CB	102–66	CB L'Horta Godella	Cartagena
19:00	Scoring by quarter: 19–17, 24–13, 32–17, 27–19
	Pts: González 16; Rebs: Eyck 9 Asts: Cabrera 6 Eff: González 23	Boxscore	Pts: Olaizola 14; Rebs: Carot 6 Asts: Carot, Marí 3 Eff: Olaizola 12	Arena: Palacio de Deportes; Referees: Paula Lema, Héctor Sanhermelando, Javier Sáez

12 November 2024	Class Bàsquet San Antoni	93–74	Nadunet Refitel Bàsquet Llíria	Sant Antoni de Portmany
20:00	Scoring by quarter: 21–20, 19–19, 23–21, 30–14
	Pts: Zídek 30; Rebs: Llamas, Zídek 5 Asts: de la Rúa 8 Eff: Zídek 29	Boxscore	Pts: Pérez 17; Rebs: Osarenren 9 Asts: Torres 5 Eff: Kandulu 21	Arena: Sa Pedrera; Referees: Miquel Remisa, Miguel Ángel Soto, Óscar Navarro

== Quarter-finals ==
The quarter-finals were played in two-legged ties on a home-and-away basis that were determined by luck of the draw. The first legs were played on December 23, 2024, and the second legs were played on January 7, 2025. The teams from the lower divisions played the second leg at home, while in the case of same division, the luck of the draw determined the order of the matches.

Team 1	Agg.	Team 2	1st leg	2nd leg
Monbus Obradoiro	143–141	UEMC Real Valladolid Baloncesto	78–80	65–61
Real Betis Baloncesto	160–149	Alimerka Oviedo Baloncesto	82–78	78–71
ODILO FC Cartagena CB	183–177	Amics Castelló	76–89	107–88
Movistar Estudiantes	149–187	Silbö San Pablo Burgos	58–96	91–91

Source: FEB

=== First leg ===
23 December 2024	Alimerka Oviedo Baloncesto	78–82	Real Betis Baloncesto	Oviedo
19:30	Scoring by quarter: 14–28, 26–24, 15–18, 23–12
	Pts: Hutchinson 13; Rebs: Cosialls 6 Asts: Valinotti 5 Eff: Duščak 14	Boxscore	Pts: Hughes 22; Rebs: Radončić 9 Asts: three players 2 Eff: Hughes 25	Arena: Municipal de Pumarín; Attendance: 1,014; Referees: Asier Quintas, Jordi Domingo, Alejandro Aranzana

23 December 2024	UEMC Real Valladolid Baloncesto	80–78	Monbus Obradoiro	Valladolid
20:45	Scoring by quarter: 23–26, 15–23, 16–14, 26–15
	Pts: Kovačevič 18; Rebs: Puidet 7 Asts: Sans 7 Eff: Kovačevič, Vučetić 15	Boxscore	Pts: Quintela 23; Rebs: Jiménez 9 Asts: Quintela 3 Eff: Quintela 26	Arena: Polideportivo Pisuerga; Attendance: 1,900; Referees: Enrique López, Eva Aresté, Alberto García

23 December 2024	Amics Castelló	89–76	ODILO FC Cartagena CB	Castellón de la Plana
20:45	Scoring by quarter: 21–21, 14–18, 25–20, 29–17
	Pts: Stutz 24; Rebs: Stutz 10; Asts: Tate 6 Eff: Stutz 29	Boxscore	Pts: Jordá 15; Rebs: González 8 Asts: Hermanson 4 Eff: González 17	Arena: Ciutat de Castelló; Attendance: 669; Referees: Daniel Checa, Héctor Sanhermelando, Francisco Olmos

23 December 2024	Silbö San Pablo Burgos	96–58	Movistar Estudiantes	Burgos
20:45	Scoring by quarter: 27–12, 16–10, 30–16, 23–20
	Pts: Cremo 20; Rebs: Fischer 7 Asts: Cremo, Guðmundsson 4 Eff: Cremo 23	Boxscore	Pts: Barro 12; Rebs: Barro 8 Asts: Granger 2 Eff: Barro 15	Arena: Coliseum Burgos; Attendance: 8,223; Referees: Germán Morales, Jaime Gómez, Sergio del Val

=== Second leg ===
7 January 2025	Monbus Obradoiro	65–61 (143–141 agg.)	UEMC Real Valladolid Baloncesto	Santiago de Compostela
20:00	Scoring by quarter: 9–15, 14–16, 23–18, 19–12
	Pts: Davison 17; Rebs: Jiménez, Stephens 7 Asts: Davison 3 Eff: Davison 31	Boxscore	Pts: Manchón 17; Rebs: Mballa 9 Asts: Torres 3 Eff: Mballa 20	Arena: Multiusos Fontes do Sar; Attendance: 2,500; Referees: Jorge Baena, Antonio Zamora, Juan Alberto Pinela

7 January 2025	Real Betis Baloncesto	78–71 (160–149 agg.)	Alimerka Oviedo Baloncesto	Seville
20:00	Scoring by quarter: 9–23, 28–10, 19–15, 22–23
	Pts: Renfroe 19; Rebs: Radončić 7 Asts: Renfroe 3 Eff: Renfroe 23	Boxscore	Pts: Martí 13; Rebs: Martí 6 Asts: Lobaco 3 Eff: Martí 16	Arena: San Pablo; Attendance: 4,500; Referees: Héctor Báez, José Carlos Sierra, Carlos Betanzos

7 January 2025	Movistar Estudiantes	91–91 (149–187 agg.)	Silbö San Pablo Burgos	Madrid
20:00	Scoring by quarter: 26–19, 18–19, 20–26, 27–27
	Pts: Schmidt 17; Rebs: Barro 8 Asts: Granger 5 Eff: Barro, Díaz 19	Boxscore	Pts: Lapornik 22; Rebs: Fischer 8 Asts: Cuevas, Guðmundsson 4 Eff: Lapornik 24	Arena: Movistar Academy Magariños; Attendance: 1,200; Referees: Ángel de Lucas, Cristina Adán, Israel Chacón

7 January 2025	ODILO FC Cartagena CB	107–88(OT) (183–177 agg.)	Amics Castelló	Cartagena
20:30	Scoring by quarter: 24–20, 20–18, 22–26, 29–18, Overtime: 12–6
	Pts: Hermanson 23; Rebs: Gil, Smallwood 6 Asts: Cabrera 6 Eff: Hermanson 22	Boxscore	Pts: Ngom 21; Rebs: Okouo 8 Asts: Faner 3 Eff: Ngom 29	Arena: Palacio de Deportes; Attendance: 1,127; Referees: Juan Ramón Hurtado, Miquel Remisa, Julio Rijo

== Final Four ==
The Final Four was a single-elimination tournament consisting of two rounds contested by the four series winners of the quarter-finals. It was played on January 24–25, 2025 at the Coliseum Burgos in the city of Burgos.

=== Bracket ===
Semi-finals; 24 January
Monbus Obradoiro	86
Real Betis Baloncesto	71
ODILO FC Cartagena CB	79
Silbö San Pablo Burgos	101

Final; 25 January
Monbus Obradoiro	69
Silbö San Pablo Burgos	97

Source: FEB

=== Semi-finals ===
24 January 2025	Monbus Obradoiro	86–71	Real Betis Baloncesto	Burgos
17:30	Scoring by quarter: 27–13, 24–17, 18–28, 17–13
	Pts: Mićović 16; Rebs: Balvín 8 Asts: Davison 7 Eff: Balvín 18	Boxscore	Pts: Hughes 24; Rebs: Renfroe 6 Asts: Radončić 4 Eff: Hughes 23	Arena: Coliseum Burgos; Attendance: 3,512; Referees: Carlos García, Paula Lema, Fernando Ibáñez

24 January 2025	ODILO FC Cartagena CB	79–101	Silbö San Pablo Burgos	Burgos
20:30	Scoring by quarter: 17–30, 22–31, 25–18, 15–22
	Pts: González 15; Rebs: González 7 Asts: Cabrera 3 Eff: González 22	Boxscore	Pts: Díez 15; Rebs: Díez 10; Asts: three players 2 Eff: Díez, Fischer 24	Arena: Coliseum Burgos; Attendance: 3,255; Referees: Jacobo Rial, Javier Ávila, Rodrigo Palanca

=== Final ===
25 January 2025	Monbus Obradoiro	69–97	Silbö San Pablo Burgos	Burgos
19:00	Scoring by quarter: 18–16, 19–25, 15–37, 17–19
	Pts: Balvín 18; Rebs: Balvín 9 Asts: three players 3 Eff: Balvín 28	Boxscore	Pts: Corbalán 20; Rebs: four players 3 Asts: Corbalán 5 Eff: Corbalán 32	Arena: Coliseum Burgos; Attendance: 4,505; Referees: Francisco José Zafra, Javier Ávila, Rodrigo Palanca

2024–25 Spain Cup champion
Silbö San Pablo Burgos
1st title
