= Spain Cup =

Spanish basketball cup competition

- Current season, competition or edition: 2025–26 Spain Cup
- Sport: Basketball
- First season: 2024–25
- No. of teams: 45
- Country: Spain
- Confederation: FIBA Europe
- Most recent champions: Movistar Estudiantes (1st title) (2025–26)
- Related competitions: Primera FEB; Segunda FEB

The Spain Cup (Spanish: Copa España) is an annual 2nd-tier level league cup competition for Spanish basketball teams, that is organized by the Spanish Basketball Federation (FEB). It is contested annually by clubs from Primera FEB and Segunda FEB, Spain's 2nd and 3rd-tier level leagues. It was played for the first time in the 2024–25 season.

== History ==
On 24 May 2024, the Spanish Basketball Federation announced the creation of the new Spain Cup with the aim to replace the Copa Princesa de Asturias and the Copa LEB Plata by merging both competitions. It made its debut in the 2024–25 season.

== Format ==
For the 2024–25 season, 40 teams from Primera FEB and Segunda FEB joined the competition in its first stage, and were divided into 8 groups of five teams. The group winners joined the quarter-finals where the four winners finally met at a Final Four.

For the 2025–26 season, the tournament was expanded to 46 teams with the participation of all teams from Primera FEB and Segunda FEB. It will begin with a preliminary group stage in which the 28 teams from Segunda FEB will be divided into 7 groups of four teams. The 14 highest-ranked teams from the group stage will join the knockout phase alongside the 18 teams from Primera FEB in a sudden-death phase where the four winners will conclude at a Final Four.

== Prizes ==
=== Prize money ===
Starting with the 2025–26 season, the winning team will receive, along with its trophy, a cash prize of €50,000. This prize would have an additional €15,000 for the highest-ranked team from the Segunda FEB if the winner is from the Primera FEB.

== Finals by year ==
Spain Cup finals
Season	Winner	Score	Runner-up	Semi-finalists	Venue
2024–25	Silbö San Pablo Burgos	97–69	Monbus Obradoiro	Real Betis Baloncesto	Coliseum Burgos, Burgos
2024–25	Silbö San Pablo Burgos	97–69	Monbus Obradoiro	ODILO FC Cartagena CB	Coliseum Burgos, Burgos
2025–26	Movistar Estudiantes	73–69	Súper Agropal Palencia	Cloud.gal Ourense Baloncesto	Municipal de Deportes, Palencia
2025–26	Movistar Estudiantes	73–69	Súper Agropal Palencia	Flexicar Fuenlabrada	Municipal de Deportes, Palencia

== Performance by team ==
Spain Cup winners by teams
Team	Winners	Runners-up	Semi-finalists	Seasons won	Seasons runner-up	Seasons semi-finalist
San Pablo Burgos	1	0	0	2024–25	—	—
Estudiantes	1	0	0	2025–26	—	—
Obradoiro	0	1	0	—	2024–25	—
Palencia	0	1	0	—	2025–26	—
Real Betis	0	0	1	—	—	2024–25
Cartagena	0	0	1	—	—	2024–25
Ourense	0	0	1	—	—	2025–26
Fuenlabrada	0	0	1	—	—	2025–26
