= 2023–24 LEB Oro season =

LEB Oro
- Season: 2023–24
- Games played: 325
- Teams: 18

Final standings
- Champions: Leyma Coruña (1st title)
- Promoted: Leyma Coruña; ICG Força Lleida
- Relegated: Melilla Ciudad del Deporte; Cáceres Patrimonio de la Humanidad; Rioverde Clavijo

Records
- Biggest home win: Burgos 105–55 Ourense (16 December 2023)
- Biggest away win: Castelló 72–112 Tizona (17 March 2024)
- Highest scoring: Burgos 109–102 Cáceres (6 April 2024)

The 2023–24 LEB Oro season was the 28th season of the Spanish basketball second league. It started on 6 October 2023 with the first round of the regular season and ended on 9 June 2024 with the Final Four.

== Teams ==
=== Promotion and relegation (pre-season) ===
A total of 18 teams contested the league, including 13 sides from the 2022–23 season, two relegated from the Liga ACB and three promoted from the LEB Plata.

▼ Relegated from Liga ACB	▲ Promoted to Liga ACB
Real Betis Baloncesto; Baloncesto Fuenlabrada	MoraBanc Andorra; Zunder Palencia
▲ Promoted from LEB Plata	▼ Relegated to LEB Plata
Grupo Ureta Tizona Burgos; ~~CB Prat~~ (Note: It refused to promote and Rioverde Clavijo was registered in its place.); Hestia Menorca	~~Melilla Ciudad del Deporte~~ (Note: It swapped places with CB Almansa con Afanion.); Juaristi ISB; Bueno Arenas Albacete Basket

=== Venues and locations ===
Location of teams in 2023–24 LEB Oro

Team	Home city	Arena	Capacity
Alimerka Oviedo Baloncesto	Oviedo	Municipal de Pumarín	1,138
Amics Castelló	Castellón de la Plana	Ciutat de Castelló	6,000
Baloncesto Fuenlabrada	Fuenlabrada	Fernando Martín	5,700
Cáceres Patrimonio de la Humanidad	Cáceres	Multiusos Ciudad de Cáceres	6,500
Club Ourense Baloncesto	Ourense	Pazo Paco Paz	5,500
Grupo Alega Cantabria	Torrelavega	Vicente Trueba	2,688
Grupo Ureta Tizona Burgos	Burgos	Polideportivo El Plantío	2,432
Guuk Gipuzkoa Basket	San Sebastián	Angulas Aguinaga Arena	11,000
Hestia Menorca	Mahón	Pavelló Menorca	5,115
HLA Alicante	Alicante	Pedro Ferrándiz	5,696
ICG Força Lleida	Lleida	Espai Fruita Barris Nord	6,100
Leyma Coruña	A Coruña	Pazo dos Deportes de Riazor	4,425
Longevida San Pablo Burgos	Burgos	Coliseum Burgos	9,454
Melilla Ciudad del Deporte	Melilla	Ciudad de Melilla	2,900
Movistar Estudiantes	Madrid	WiZink Center	13,109
Movistar Estudiantes	Madrid	Movistar Academy Magariños	600
Real Betis Baloncesto	Seville	San Pablo	7,242
Rioverde Clavijo	Logroño	Palacio de los Deportes	4,500
UEMC Real Valladolid Baloncesto	Valladolid	Polideportivo Pisuerga	6,800

== Regular season ==
=== League table ===
Pos	Team	Pld	W	L	PF	PA	PD	Pts	Promotion, qualification or relegation
1	Leyma Coruña	34	27	7	3042	2763	+279	61	Promotion to Liga ACB
2	Longevida San Pablo Burgos	34	26	8	2964	2601	+363	60	Qualification to playoffs
3	ICG Força Lleida	34	26	8	2794	2546	+248	60	Qualification to playoffs
4	Movistar Estudiantes	34	25	9	2856	2588	+268	59	Qualification to playoffs
5	Grupo Ureta Tizona Burgos	34	25	9	3049	2725	+324	59	Qualification to playoffs
6	Guuk Gipuzkoa Basket	34	23	11	2819	2634	+185	57	Qualification to playoffs
7	HLA Alicante	34	19	15	2699	2608	+91	53	Qualification to playoffs
8	UEMC Real Valladolid Baloncesto	34	18	16	2636	2715	−79	52	Qualification to playoffs
9	Real Betis Baloncesto	34	17	17	2755	2669	+86	51	Qualification to playoffs
10	Baloncesto Fuenlabrada	34	16	18	2644	2660	−16	50	
11	Club Ourense Baloncesto	34	14	20	2504	2690	−186	48	
12	Hestia Menorca	34	14	20	2474	2617	−143	48	
13	Alimerka Oviedo Baloncesto	34	13	21	2676	2731	−55	47	
14	Grupo Alega Cantabria	34	11	23	2644	2825	−181	45	
15	Amics Castelló	34	11	23	2692	2947	−255	45	
16	Melilla Ciudad del Deporte	34	10	24	2577	2788	−211	44	Relegation to Segunda FEB
17	Cáceres Patrimonio de la Humanidad	34	6	28	2515	2885	−370	40	Relegation to Segunda FEB
18	Rioverde Clavijo	34	5	29	2384	2732	−348	39	Relegation to Segunda FEB

Source: FEB

=== Results ===
Home \ Away	OVI	CAS	FUE	CAC	OUR	CAN	TIZ	GIP	MEN	ALI	LLE	COR	BUR	MEL	EST	BET	CLA	VLL
Alimerka Oviedo	—	80–81	81–60	89–71	87–78	86–81	60–75	81–86	78–84	89–83	73–75	78–83	75–71	71–79	61–75	86–81	80–59	83–66
Amics Castelló	83–61	—	77–73	90–86	78–81	92–89	72–112	80–90	83–84	70–64	92–98	74–83	81–94	90–85	68–84	88–100	79–72	80–84
Baloncesto Fuenlabrada	74–69	85–98	—	94–67	76–66	73–78	79–85	81–71	75–81	77–71	73–75	88–82	64–72	93–74	55–80	81–71	78–75	85–58
Cáceres Patrimonio	86–78	81–84	71–97	—	71–77	71–73	64–66	68–86	63–56	75–84	77–100	84–81	60–81	90–76	60–83	64–61	85–78	79–87
Club Ourense Baloncesto	88–83	93–80	68–80	73–61	—	65–72	72–79	76–87	61–66	77–68	73–80	84–87	64–91	59–65	92–71	84–83	68–51	99–77
Grupo Alega Cantabria	84–83	91–80	81–74	95–75	76–80	—	67–94	96–106	95–77	65–82	75–63	81–83	72–84	75–69	67–81	67–78	71–75	81–82
Grupo Ureta Tizona Burgos	109–93	80–66	119–77	92–87	85–80	93–84	—	101–76	83–88	90–75	72–79	92–103	110–96	89–74	90–83	101–80	110–76	92–86
Guuk Gipuzkoa Basket	67–58	92–78	81–70	88–64	99–65	76–67	76–74	—	87–79	97–87	87–72	84–91	80–78	88–80	83–85	93–99	84–66	84–81
Hestia Menorca	90–74	85–65	85–88	86–67	50–74	84–68	77–78	89–81	—	57–76	67–70	56–51	82–90	66–83	67–75	75–84	68–67	76–57
HLA Alicante	83–73	86–64	83–79	88–73	91–82	89–79	94–89	71–70	67–61	—	74–79	84–74	73–83	90–66	75–65	73–78	92–56	54–75
ICG Força Lleida	90–84	97–82	90–73	95–71	90–55	88–77	66–86	75–68	105–70	91–77	—	83–85	77–72	96–62	93–79	88–75	79–72	81–56
Leyma Coruña	88–77	95–82	83–86	97–80	106–77	119–90	97–91	67–84	105–73	79–74	97–81	—	104–103	97–82	114–88	92–78	100–77	80–66
Longevida San Pablo Burgos	87–68	91–67	81–69	109–102	105–55	88–69	104–97	75–70	90–69	98–95	79–66	77–75	—	99–72	87–91	82–94	83–66	94–69
Melilla Ciudad del Deporte	84–81	76–65	65–87	95–79	67–81	71–84	83–73	82–93	74–92	69–73	75–80	74–80	79–92	—	80–81	83–87	91–68	80–81
Movistar Estudiantes	76–87	95–79	98–83	89–73	97–56	101–61	103–85	90–81	81–56	93–75	75–72	76–78	57–77	85–72	—	93–87	84–59	91–92
Real Betis Baloncesto	85–94	98–77	79–78	80–62	72–48	80–70	84–85	81–83	88–57	97–78	73–74	77–81	76–88	86–70	77–86	—	94–85	70–69
Rioverde Clavijo	78–81	93–96	58–67	78–76	78–82	99–84	61–78	56–76	64–55	69–86	60–72	88–94	62–79	62–64	73–77	62–56	—	69–77
UEMC Real Valladolid	91–92	89–71	87–72	99–72	81–71	84–79	63–94	71–65	70–66	69–84	80–74	94–111	91–84	73–76	73–88	72–66	86–72	—

Source: FEB
Legend: Blue = home team win; Red = away team win.

== Playoffs ==
=== Bracket ===
Quarter-finals
C	Movistar Estudiantes	86	98	84	65	65	3
9	Real Betis Baloncesto	77	73	90	77	54	2
5	Grupo Ureta Tizona Burgos	108	90	87	79	76	3
6	Guuk Gipuzkoa Basket	90	92	77	82	73	2
2	Longevida San Pablo Burgos	81	91	91	3
8	UEMC Real Valladolid Baloncesto	59	61	75	0
3	ICG Força Lleida	84	88	73	3
7	HLA Alicante	73	68	58	0

Semi-finals
Movistar Estudiantes	86
Grupo Ureta Tizona Burgos	62
Longevida San Pablo Burgos	77
ICG Força Lleida	80

Final
Movistar Estudiantes	70
ICG Força Lleida	85

Source: FEB

=== Quarter-finals ===
The first legs were played on 17 May, the second legs on 19 May, the third legs on 24 May, the fourth legs on 26 May, if necessary, and the fifth legs on 30–31 May 2024, if necessary.

Team 1	Series	Team 2	1st leg	2nd leg	3rd leg	4th leg	5th leg
Movistar Estudiantes	3–2	Real Betis Baloncesto	86–77	98–73	84–90	65–77	65–54
Longevida San Pablo Burgos	3–0	UEMC Real Valladolid Baloncesto	81–59	91–61	91–75	—	—
ICG Força Lleida	3–0	HLA Alicante	84–73	88–68	73–58	—	—
Grupo Ureta Tizona Burgos	3–2	Guuk Gipuzkoa Basket	108–90	90–92	87–77	79–82	76–73

Source: FEB

==== First leg ====
17 May 2024	Movistar Estudiantes	86–77 (Series: 1–0)	Real Betis Baloncesto	Madrid
20:00	Scoring by quarter: 26–9, 20–31, 17–19, 23–18
	Pts: Larsen 17; Rebs: Cáffaro 7 Asts: Larsen, Wintering 3 Eff: Larsen 21	Boxscore	Pts: Rodríguez 28; Rebs: DeBisschop, Rodríguez 6 Asts: Rodríguez 5 Eff: Rodríguez 31	Arena: Movistar Academy Magariños; Referees: Carlos García, Ángel Albacete, Igor Esteve

17 May 2024	Grupo Ureta Tizona Burgos	108–90 (Series: 1–0)	Guuk Gipuzkoa Basket	Burgos
20:45	Scoring by quarter: 30–20, 24–26, 26–22, 28–22
	Pts: Jofresa 23; Rebs: Parrado 6 Asts: Pacheco 5 Eff: Jofresa 26	Boxscore	Pts: Aurrecoechea 23; Rebs: Aurrecoechea 10; Asts: Zubizarreta 5 Eff: Aurrecoechea 28	Arena: Polideportivo El Plantío; Referees: Ángel de Lucas, Jorge Muñoz, Cristina Adán

17 May 2024	Longevida San Pablo Burgos	81–59 (Series: 1–0)	UEMC Real Valladolid Baloncesto	Burgos
21:00	Scoring by quarter: 31–16, 14–17, 17–8, 19–18
	Pts: Corbalán 17; Rebs: Ristić 8 Asts: Rogić 5 Eff: Corbalán 19	Boxscore	Pts: Nwogbo 18; Rebs: Nwogbo 9 Asts: Puidet 4 Eff: Nwogbo 23	Arena: Coliseum Burgos; Referees: Jacobo Rial, Sandra Sánchez, Pablo Rodríguez

17 May 2024	ICG Força Lleida	84–73 (Series: 1–0)	HLA Alicante	Lleida
21:00	Scoring by quarter: 23–15, 20–17, 19–17, 22–25
	Pts: Lobo 19; Rebs: Krutwig 12; Asts: Villar 4 Eff: Krutwig 28	Boxscore	Pts: Harris 14; Rebs: Rodríguez 7 Asts: Guðmundsson 6 Eff: Guðmundsson 18	Arena: Espai Fruita Barris Nord; Referees: Enrique López, Mikel Cañigueral, Fernando Ibáñez

==== Second leg ====
19 May 2024	Movistar Estudiantes	98–73 (Series: 2–0)	Real Betis Baloncesto	Madrid
12:30	Scoring by quarter: 19–23, 31–15, 24–17, 24–18
	Pts: Ferrando, Leimanis 21; Rebs: Larsen, Murphy 6 Asts: Larsen 5 Eff: Ferrando 27	Boxscore	Pts: Marín 15; Rebs: Bērziņš 7 Asts: Marín 4 Eff: Marín 16	Arena: WiZink Center; Referees: Germán Morales, Josep María Olivares, Ariadna Chueca

19 May 2024	ICG Força Lleida	88–68 (Series: 2–0)	HLA Alicante	Lleida
17:00	Scoring by quarter: 24–18, 25–17, 13–19, 26–14
	Pts: Kuath 15; Rebs: Krutwig 9 Asts: Villar 5 Eff: Kuath 17	Boxscore	Pts: Davison 21; Rebs: Barro 11; Asts: Davison 5 Eff: Davison 24	Arena: Espai Fruita Barris Nord; Referees: Leandro Lezcano, Eric Carrera, María Ángeles García

19 May 2024	Grupo Ureta Tizona Burgos	90–92 (Series: 1–1)	Guuk Gipuzkoa Basket	Burgos
17:15	Scoring by quarter: 19–27, 31–21, 20–23, 20–21
	Pts: Parrado 21; Rebs: Horton, Parrado 5 Asts: Pacheco 5 Eff: Parrado 22	Boxscore	Pts: Barcello 25; Rebs: Aurrecoechea 6 Asts: Barcello, Vrankić 3 Eff: Barcello 32	Arena: Polideportivo El Plantío; Referees: Paula Lema, Javier Ávila, Cristian Martín

19 May 2024	Longevida San Pablo Burgos	91–61 (Series: 2–0)	UEMC Real Valladolid Baloncesto	Burgos
19:15	Scoring by quarter: 18–21, 23–12, 27–14, 23–14
	Pts: Barrera 17; Rebs: Kasibabu 6 Asts: Atić, Speight 6 Eff: Speight 26	Boxscore	Pts: Nwogbo 16; Rebs: Nwogbo 8 Asts: Puidet 5 Eff: Nwogbo 21	Arena: Coliseum Burgos; Referees: Francisco Zafra, Juan Ramón Hurtado, Francisco González

==== Third leg ====
24 May 2024	Real Betis Baloncesto	90–84 (Series: 1–2)	Movistar Estudiantes	Seville
20:00	Scoring by quarter: 23–23, 23–21, 24–20, 20–20
	Pts: Rodríguez 19; Rebs: DeBisschop 7 Asts: Faggiano 6 Eff: Đedović 19	Boxscore	Pts: Alonso 35; Rebs: Larsen 6 Asts: Larsen 5 Eff: Alonso 38	Arena: San Pablo; Referees: Ángel de Lucas, Juan Pedro Morales, Jesús Marcos Martínez

24 May 2024	Guuk Gipuzkoa Basket	77–87 (Series: 1–2)	Grupo Ureta Tizona Burgos	San Sebastián
20:30	Scoring by quarter: 19–25, 37–23, 6–22, 15–17
	Pts: Barcello 22; Rebs: Aurrecoechea, Vrankić 7 Asts: four players 2 Eff: Barcello 25	Boxscore	Pts: Jofresa 20; Rebs: Thiam 7 Asts: Horton 4 Eff: Jofresa 20	Arena: Angulas Aguinaga Arena; Referees: Germán Morales, Héctor Báez, Antonio Zamora

24 May 2024	UEMC Real Valladolid Baloncesto	75–91 (Series: 0–3)	Longevida San Pablo Burgos	Valladolid
20:45	Scoring by quarter: 22–27, 16–27, 18–16, 19–21
	Pts: Schmidt 20; Rebs: Kabasele 7 Asts: Puidet 5 Eff: de la Fuente	Boxscore	Pts: Ristić 17; Rebs: Ristić 9 Asts: Speight 7 Eff: Ristić 25	Arena: Polideportivo Pisuerga; Referees: Enrique López, Asier Quintas, Daniel Checa

24 May 2024	HLA Alicante	58–73 (Series: 0–3)	ICG Força Lleida	Alicante
20:45	Scoring by quarter: 10–26, 18–16, 13–16, 17–15
	Pts: Kostadinov 13; Rebs: Kostadinov 9 Asts: Guðmundsson 4 Eff: Kostadinov 16	Boxscore	Pts: Lobo 18; Rebs: Krutwig, Simeunović 7 Asts: Hasbrouck 5 Eff: Krutwig 17	Arena: Pedro Ferrándiz; Referees: Carlos García, Víctor Mas, Rodrigo Palanca

==== Fourth leg ====
26 May 2024	Guuk Gipuzkoa Basket	82–79 (Series: 2–2)	Grupo Ureta Tizona Burgos	San Sebastián
17:00	Scoring by quarter: 22–20, 22–27, 14–19, 24–13
	Pts: Oroz 15; Rebs: Martínez 5 Asts: Barcello, Oroz 3 Eff: Aurrecoechea 15	Boxscore	Pts: Parrado 15; Rebs: Seoane, Thiam; Asts: four players 4 Eff: Saint-Supéry 15	Arena: Angulas Aguinaga Arena; Referees: Francisco Zafra, Sandra Sánchez, Fernando Ibáñez

26 May 2024	Real Betis Baloncesto	77–65 (Series: 2–2)	Movistar Estudiantes	Seville
18:00	Scoring by quarter: 17–9, 18–22, 27–17, 15–17
	Pts: Polanco 28; Rebs: DeBisschop 10; Asts: DeBisschop 3 Eff: Bērziņš 16	Boxscore	Pts: Larsen 17; Rebs: Larsen 7 Asts: Wintering 4 Eff: Larsen 19	Arena: San Pablo; Referees: Jacobo Rial, Leandro Lezcano, Javier Ávila

==== Fifth leg ====
30 May 2024	Movistar Estudiantes	65–54 (Series: 3–2)	Real Betis Baloncesto	Madrid
20:00	Scoring by quarter: 19–15, 14–11, 13–17, 19–11
	Pts: Murphy 13; Rebs: Larsen 9 Asts: Larsen 5 Eff: Murphy 17	Boxscore	Pts: Faggiano 16; Rebs: Polanco 8 Asts: Rodríguez 4 Eff: Faggiano 19	Arena: WiZink Center; Referees: Germán Morales, Carlos García, Paula Lema

31 May 2024	Grupo Ureta Tizona Burgos	76–73 (Series: 3–2)	Guuk Gipuzkoa Basket	Burgos
20:45	Scoring by quarter: 16–18, 18–20, 23–12, 19–23
	Pts: Horton 20; Rebs: Vila 5 Asts: Saint-Supéry 4 Eff: Horton 15	Boxscore	Pts: Barcello 18; Rebs: Oroz 10; Asts: Barcello 3 Eff: Oroz 20	Arena: Polideportivo El Plantío; Referees: Ángel de Lucas, Enrique López, Cristian Martín

=== Semi-finals ===
The semi-finals were played on 8 June 2024 at the Madrid Arena in the city of Madrid.

8 June 2024	Movistar Estudiantes	86–62	Grupo Ureta Tizona Burgos	Madrid
17:30	Scoring by quarter: 26–16, 18–19, 18–14, 24–13
	Pts: Alonso 19; Rebs: Murphy 7 Asts: Ferrando, Larsen 4 Eff: Alonso 18	Boxscore	Pts: Pacheco, Saint-Supéry 12; Rebs: Thiam, Vila 10; Asts: Pacheco 4 Eff: Seoane, Vila 9	Arena: Madrid Arena; Referees: Germán Morales, Enrique López, Daniel Checa

8 June 2024	Longevida San Pablo Burgos	77–80	ICG Força Lleida	Madrid
20:30	Scoring by quarter: 20–18, 17–17, 23–25, 17–20
	Pts: Corbalán 19; Rebs: Jiménez 6 Asts: Speight 5 Eff: Corbalán 20	Boxscore	Pts: Lobo 18; Rebs: Krutwig 10; Asts: Varela 5 Eff: Lobo 20	Arena: Madrid Arena; Referees: Carlos Garcia, Paula Lema, Javier Ávila

=== Final ===
The final was played on 9 June 2024 at the Madrid Arena in the city of Madrid.

9 June 2024	Movistar Estudiantes	70–85	ICG Força Lleida	Madrid
18:00	Scoring by quarter: 10–25, 11–27, 27–20, 22–13
	Pts: Dee 25; Rebs: Cáffaro, Larsen 5 Asts: Dee 3 Eff: Dee 21	Boxscore	Pts: Kuath, Simeunović 16; Rebs: Kuath 8 Asts: Villar 5 Eff: Kuath 23	Arena: Madrid Arena; Referees: Ángel de Lucas, Carlos García, Enrique López

== Copa Princesa de Asturias ==
The Copa Princesa de Asturias was played on 28 January 2024, by the top two qualified teams after the end of the first half of the season (round 17). The champion of the cup play the playoffs against the ninth qualified as it finished the league between the second and the fifth qualified.

=== Teams qualified ===
Pos	Team	Pld	W	L	PF	PA	PD	Pts
1	Movistar Estudiantes (H)	17	14	3	1460	1245	+215	31
2	Leyma Coruña	17	13	4	1523	1358	+165	30

Source: FEB
(H) Hosts

=== Game ===
28 January 2024	Movistar Estudiantes	80–72	Leyma Coruña	Madrid
12:30	Scoring by quarter: 21–21, 21–17, 11–16, 27–18
	Pts: Wintering 16; Rebs: Larsen 7 Asts: Wintering 6 Eff: Wintering 22	Report	Pts: Huskić 20; Rebs: Huskić, McDonnell 6 Asts: Huskić 3 Eff: Huskić 24	Arena: WiZink Center; Attendance: 8,321; Referees: Germán Morales, Sandra Sánchez, Leandro Lezcano

== Final standings ==
Pos	Team	Pld	W	L	Promotion or relegation
1	Leyma Coruña (C, P)	34	27	7	Promotion to Liga ACB
2	ICG Força Lleida (P)	39	31	8	Promotion to Liga ACB
3	Movistar Estudiantes (X)	41	29	12	
4	Longevida San Pablo Burgos	38	29	9	
5	Grupo Ureta Tizona Burgos	40	28	12	
6	Guuk Gipuzkoa Basket	39	25	14	
7	HLA Alicante	37	19	18	
8	UEMC Real Valladolid Baloncesto	37	18	19	
9	Real Betis Baloncesto	39	19	20	
10	Baloncesto Fuenlabrada	34	16	18	
11	Club Ourense Baloncesto	34	14	20	
12	Hestia Menorca	34	14	20	
13	Alimerka Oviedo Baloncesto	34	13	21	
14	Grupo Alega Cantabria	34	11	23	
15	Amics Castelló	34	11	23	
16	Melilla Ciudad del Deporte (R)	34	10	24	Relegation to Segunda FEB
17	Cáceres Patrimonio de la Humanidad (R)	34	6	28	Relegation to Segunda FEB
18	Rioverde Clavijo (R)	34	5	29	Relegation to Segunda FEB

Source: FEB
(C) Champions; (P) Promoted; (R) Relegated; (X) Champion of the Copa Princesa de Asturias
