= 2025–26 Arizona State Sun Devils men's basketball team =

American college basketball season

2025–26 Arizona State Sun Devils men's basketball
- Conference: Big 12 Conference
- Record: 17–16 (7–11 Big 12)
- Head coach: Bobby Hurley (11th season)
- Assistant coaches: Jerrance Howard (2nd season); Nick Irvin (2nd season); Ty Amundsen (1st season)
- Home arena: Desert Financial Arena

2025–26 Big 12 men's basketball standings
	Conf.				Overall
Team	W		L	PCT	W		L	PCT
No. 3 Arizona †	16	–	2	.889	36	–	3	.923
No. 7 Houston	14	–	4	.778	30	–	7	.811
No. 20 Kansas	12	–	6	.667	24	–	11	.686
No. 21 Texas Tech	12	–	6	.667	23	–	11	.676
No. 8 Iowa State	12	–	6	.667	29	–	8	.784
TCU	11	–	7	.611	23	–	12	.657
West Virginia	9	–	9	.500	21	–	14	.600
UCF	9	–	9	.500	21	–	12	.636
Cincinnati	9	–	9	.500	18	–	15	.545
BYU	9	–	9	.500	23	–	12	.657
Colorado	7	–	11	.389	17	–	16	.515
Arizona State	7	–	11	.389	17	–	16	.515
Baylor	6	–	12	.333	17	–	17	.500
Oklahoma State	6	–	12	.333	20	–	15	.571
Kansas State	3	–	15	.167	12	–	20	.375
Utah	2	–	16	.111	10	–	22	.313
† 2026 Big 12 tournament winner Rankings from AP poll

The 2025–26 Arizona State Sun Devils men's basketball team represented Arizona State University during the 2025–26 NCAA Division I men's basketball season. The Sun Devils, led by 11th-year head coach Bobby Hurley, played their home games at Desert Financial Arena in Tempe, Arizona as members of the Big 12 Conference.

== Previous season ==
The Sun Devils finished the 2024–25 season 13–20, 4–16 in Big 12 play to finish in 15th place. They lost to Kansas State in the first round of the Big 12 tournament. The Sun Devils were selected to participate in the inaugural 2025 College Basketball Crown tournament. There they lost in the first round to Nebraska.

== Off-season ==
=== Departures ===
Name	Pos.	Height	Year	Hometown	Reason for departure
Amier Ali	G/F	6'8"	Sophomore	Little Elm, TX	Transferred to Mississippi State
Connor Braun	F	6'9"	Graduate student	Tempe, AZ	Out of eligibility
Chianti Clay	G	5'11"	Senior	Milwaukee, WI	Transferred to Sul Ross State
Bobby Hurley Jr.	G	6'1"	Senior	Scottsdale, AZ	Out of eligibility
Basheer Jihad	F	6'9"	Senior	Detroit, MI	Out of eligibility
Brycen Long	G	6'2"	Graduate student	Gilbert, AZ	Transferred to Portland State
Alston Mason	G	6'2"	Senior	Tournai, Belgium	Out of eligibility
Adam Miller	G	6'3"	(redshirt) Senior	Peoria, IL	Transferred to Gonzaga
Austin Nunez	G	6'2"	Senior	Garden Ridge, TX	Transferred to UTSA
Shawn Phillips Jr.	C	7'0"	Senior	Dayton, OH	Transferred to Missouri
Jayden Quaintance	F	6'9"	Sophomore	Cleveland, OH	Transferred to Kentucky
Joson Sanon	G	6'5"	Sophomore	Fall River, MA	Transferred to St. John's
Jordan Williams	G	5'10"	Senior	Los Angeles, CA	Out of eligibility

=== Incoming transfers ===
Name	Pos.	Height	Year	Hometown	Previous school
Marcus Adams Jr.	F	6'8"	(redshirt) Sophomore	Torrance, CA	CSUN
Bryce Ford	G	6'4"	Junior	Scottsdale, AZ	Toledo
Andrija Grbović	F	6'11"	Junior	Pljevlja, Montenegro	
Adante' Holiman	G	5'11"	Senior	McAlester, OK	Georgia Southern
Anthony "Pig" Johnson	G	6'3"	Senior	Midfield, AL	University of the Cumberlands
Noah Meeusen	G	6'5"	Sophomore	Zandvliet, Belgium	
Allen Mukeba	F	6'8"	Graduate student	Charleroi, Belgium	UMKC
Moe Odum	G	6'2"	Senior	The Bronx, N.Y.	Pepperdine
Santiago Trouet	F	6'11"	(redshirt) Sophomore	Buenos Aires, Argentina	San Diego
Vijay Wallace	G	6'5"	Junior	Chicago, IL	Illinois Valley CC

=== Recruiting class ===
College recruiting
Name	Hometown	School	Height	Weight	Commit date
Massamba Diop; C	Rufisque, Senegal	Gran Canaria	7 ft 1 in (2.16 m)	N/A	Jun 18, 2025
Massamba Diop; C	Recruit ratings: Scout: Rivals: 247Sports: ESPN: (NA)				
Jovan Ićitović; PF	Belgrade, Serbia		6 ft 9 in (2.06 m)	N/A	Jun 18, 2025
Jovan Ićitović; PF	Recruit ratings: Scout: Rivals: 247Sports: ESPN: (NA)				
Kash Polk; PF	Argyle, TX	Argyle HS	6 ft 10 in (2.08 m)	N/A	Jun 18, 2025
Kash Polk; PF	Recruit ratings: Scout: Rivals: 247Sports: ESPN: (NA)				
Dame Salane; C	Biella, Italy	Stafford HS (TX)	7 ft 1 in (2.16 m)	N/A	Jun 18, 2025
Dame Salane; C	Recruit ratings: Scout: Rivals: 247Sports: ESPN: (NA)				
Overall recruit ranking:
Note: In many cases, Scout, Rivals, 247Sports, On3, and ESPN may conflict in their listings of height and weight.; In these cases, the average was taken. ESPN grades are on a 100-point scale.; Sources: "2025 Team Ranking". Rivals.

== Roster ==
2025–26 Arizona State Sun Devils men's basketball team
Players
Coaches

Pos.	#	Name	Height	Weight	Year	Previous school	Hometown
C	1	Santiago Trouet	6 ft 11 in (2.11 m)	218 lb (99 kg)	Jr	San Diego	Buenos Aires, Argentina
G	2	Anthony Johnson	6 ft 3 in (1.91 m)	175 lb (79 kg)	Sr	Northeast Mississippi CC	Midfield, Alabama
G	3	Adante' Holiman	5 ft 11 in (1.8 m)	175 lb (79 kg)	Sr	UTRGV	McAlester, Oklahoma
G	4	Bryce Ford	6 ft 4 in (1.93 m)	190 lb (86 kg)	Jr	Toledo	Scottsdale, Arizona
G	5	Moe Odum	6 ft 2 in (1.88 m)	160 lb (73 kg)	Sr	Pepperdine	The Bronx, New York
G	7	Vijay Wallace	6 ft 5 in (1.96 m)	218 lb (99 kg)	Jr	Triton College	Chicago, Illinois
F	8	Marcus Adams Jr.	6 ft 8 in (2.03 m)	195 lb (88 kg)	Jr	CSUN	Torrance, California
F	11	Kash Polk	6 ft 10 in (2.08 m)	160 lb (73 kg)	Fr	Argyle High School	Argyle, Texas
G	12	Trevor Best	6 ft 3 in (1.91 m)	195 lb (88 kg)	So	Word of God Christian Academy	Wilson, North Carolina
F	14	Andrija Grbović	6 ft 11 in (2.11 m)	207 lb (94 kg)	Jr	Pljevlja, Montenegro
F	15	Noah Meeusen	6 ft 5 in (1.96 m)	209 lb (95 kg)	So	Zandvliet, Belgium
G	22	Quentin McCoy	6 ft 1 in (1.85 m)	175 lb (79 kg)	So	Robert Lindblom Math & Science Academy	Chicago, Illinois
F	23	Allen Mukeba	6 ft 6 in (1.98 m)	240 lb (109 kg)		Oakland	Charleroi, Belgium
F	24	Dame Salane	7 ft 1 in (2.16 m)	195 lb (88 kg)	Fr	Stafford High School (TX)	Biella, Italy
C	35	Massamba Diop	7 ft 1 in (2.16 m)	230 lb (104 kg)	Fr	Gran Canaria	Rufisque, Senegal
F	70	Jovan Ićitović	6 ft 8 in (2.03 m)	210 lb (95 kg)	Fr	U18 Partizan NIS	Belgrade, Serbia

Head coach

- Bobby Hurley (Duke)

Assistant coach(es)

- Jerrance Howard (Illinois)
- Nick Irvin (Shaw)
- Ty Larson

Legend

- (C) Team captain
- (S) Suspended
- (I) Ineligible
- (W) Walk-on
- Injured
- Current redshirt

Roster

== Schedule and results ==
Date time, TV	Rank^{#}	Opponent^{#}	Result	Record	High points	High rebounds	High assists	Site (attendance) city, state
Exhibition
October 12, 2025*; 12:00 p.m., ESPN+		at UC Irvine	L 68–72	–	14 – Diop	8 – Diop	3 – Tied	Bren Events Center (1,422); Irvine, CA
October 26, 2025*; 2:00 p.m., ESPN+		vs. Texas A&M; The Preview CBB Exhibition	L 88–95	–	27 – Johnson	7 – Tied	6 – Odum	Fort Bend Epicenter; Rosenberg, TX
Non-conference regular season
November 4, 2025*; 7:00 p.m., ESPN+		Southern Utah	W 81−64	1–0	17 – Johnson	6 – Mukeba	8 – Odum	Desert Financial Arena (7,513); Tempe, AZ
November 9, 2025*; 1:00 p.m., ESPN+		Utah Tech	W 81−66	2–0	18 – Diop	10 – Trouet	6 – Odum	Desert Financial Arena (5,862); Tempe, AZ
November 14, 2025*; 9:00 p.m., ESPN2		No. 19 Gonzaga	L 65−77	2–1	12 – Odum	11 – Trouet	7 – Odum	Desert Financial Arena (10,016); Tempe, AZ
November 17, 2025*; 7:00 p.m., ESPN+		Georgia State	W 75−62	3–1	24 – Odum	11 – Diop	9 – Odum	Desert Financial Arena (5,925); Tempe, AZ
November 20, 2025*; 10:00 p.m., Spectrum Sports		at Hawaii	W 83−76	4–1	20 – Ford	6 – Trouet	6 – Odum	Stan Sheriff Center (4,782); Honolulu, HI
November 24, 2025*; 9:30 p.m., ESPN2		vs. Texas; Maui Invitational Quarterfinals	W 87–86	5–1	36 – Odum	6 – Trouet	3 – Odum	Lahaina Civic Center (2,400); Lahaina, HI
November 25, 2025*; 6:00 p.m., ESPN		vs. Washington State; Maui Invitational Semifinals	W 100−94	6–1	26 – Odum	5 – Diop	5 – Odum	Lahaina Civic Center (2,400); Lahaina, HI
November 26, 2025*; 12:30 p.m., ESPN		vs. USC; Maui Invitational Championship Game	L 75−88	6–2	17 – Odum	5 – Trouet	4 – Odum	Lahaina Civic Center (2,400); Lahaina, HI
December 6, 2025*; 8:00 p.m., CBSSN		vs. Oklahoma; Jerry Colangelo Classic	W 86−70	7–2	17 – Odum	7 – Trouet	8 – Meeusen	Mortgage Matchup Center (4,856); Phoenix, AZ
December 9, 2025*; 7:00 p.m., ESPN+		Northern Arizona	W 73–48	8–2	19 – Diop	8 – Trouet	5 – Odum	Desert Financial Arena (7,250); Tempe, AZ
December 13, 2025*; 5:00 p.m., TNT/TruTV		vs. Santa Clara; Jack Jones Classic	W 82–79	9–2	15 – Tied	9 – Diop	7 – Odum	Lee's Family Forum (NA); Henderson, NV
December 17, 2025*; 8:30 p.m., FS1		at UCLA	L 77−90	9–3	20 – Johnson	7 – Diop	9 – Odum	Pauley Pavilion (5,553); Los Angeles, CA
December 21, 2025*; 1:00 p.m., ESPN2		Oregon State	L 75–78	9–4	17 – Odum	7 – Odum	6 – Odum	Desert Financial Arena (7,896); Tempe, AZ
Big 12 regular season
January 3, 2026; 3:00 p.m., TNT/TruTV		Colorado	L 89–95	9–5 (0–1)	21 – Odum	6 – Tied	12 – Odum	Desert Financial Arena (7,377); Tempe, AZ
January 7, 2026; 7:00 p.m., Peacock		at No. 9 BYU	L 76−104	9–6 (0–2)	24 – Johnson	9 – Diop	6 – Odum	Marriott Center (18,009); Provo, UT
January 10, 2026; 1:00 p.m., Peacock		Kansas State	W 87–84	10–6 (1–2)	21 – Tied	10 – Trouet	4 – Odum	Desert Financial Arena (7,133); Tempe, AZ
January 14, 2026; 8:30 p.m., FS1		at No. 1 Arizona; Rivalry	L 82–89	10–7 (1–3)	23 – Odum	7 – Trouet	7 – Odum	McKale Center (14,688); Tucson, AZ
January 18, 2026; 4:30 p.m., ESPN		at No. 7 Houston	L 73–103	10–8 (1–4)	14 – Grbovi	5 – Tied	6 – Odum	Fertitta Center (7,035); Houston, TX
January 21, 2026; 7:00 p.m., Peacock		West Virginia	L 63–75	10–9 (1–5)	17 – Odum	6 – Trouet	8 – Odum	Desert Financial Arena (7,153); Tempe, AZ
January 24, 2026; 8:00 p.m., CBSSN		Cincinnati	W 82−68	11–9 (2–5)	33 – Odum	10 – Diop	8 – Odum	Desert Financial Arena (6,950); Tempe, AZ
January 27, 2026; 5:00 p.m., ESPN+		at UCF	L 76–79	11–10 (2–6)	18 – Odum	6 – Diop	6 – Odum	Addition Financial Arena (6,621); Orlando, FL
January 31, 2026; 12:00 p.m., TNT		No. 1 Arizona; Rivalry	L 74–87	11–11 (2–7)	16 – Meeusen	7 – Trouet	5 – Meeusen	Desert Financial Arena (13,838); Tempe, AZ
February 4, 2026; 6:00 p.m., CBSSN		at Utah	W 71–63	12–11 (3–7)	15 – Diop	8 – Diop	3 – Odum	Jon M. Huntsman Center (6,650); Salt Lake City, UT
February 7, 2026; 12:00 p.m., TNT/TruTV		at Colorado	L 70–78	12–12 (3–8)	23 – Odum	7 – Diop	5 – Odum	CU Events Center (6,820); Boulder, CO
February 10, 2026; 7:00 p.m., CBSSN		Oklahoma State	W 85–76	13–12 (4–8)	17 – Diop	10 – Trouet	5 – Meeusen	Desert Financial Arena (5,809); Tempe, AZ
February 17, 2026; 9:00 p.m., ESPN2		No. 13 Texas Tech	W 72–66	14–12 (5–8)	23 – Odum	6 – Trouet	6 – Meeusen	Desert Financial Arena (6,874); Tempe, AZ
February 21, 2026; 2:00 p.m., ESPN2		at Baylor	L 68–73	14–13 (5–9)	12 – Odum	10 – Diop	3 – Odum	Foster Pavilion (7,044); Waco, TX
February 24, 2026; 7:00 p.m., CBSSN		at TCU	L 78–90	14–14 (5–10)	21 – Odum	6 – Meeusen	10 – Odum	Schollmaier Arena (5,265); Fort Worth, TX
February 28, 2026; 1:30 p.m., TNT		Utah	W 73–60	15–14 (6–10)	15 – Odum	10 – Trouet	4 – Odum	Desert Financial Arena (7,718); Tempe, AZ
March 3, 2026; 7:00 p.m., FS1		No. 14 Kansas	W 70–60	16–14 (7–10)	23 – Odum	9 – Diop	6 – Odum	Desert Financial Arena (10,452); Tempe, AZ
March 7, 2026; 12:00 p.m., FS1		at No. 6 Iowa State	L 65–85	16–15 (7–11)	12 – Diop	6 – Trouet	7 – Odum	Hilton Coliseum (14,267); Ames, IA
Big 12 tournament
March 10, 2026; 10:30 a.m., ESPN+	(12)	vs. (13) Baylor; First Round	W 83−79	17−15	19 – Johnson	9 – Trouet	3 – Meeusen	T-Mobile Center (7,238); Kansas City, MO
March 11, 2026; 10:30 a.m., ESPN	(12)	vs. (5) No. 7 Iowa State; Second Round	L 42−91	17−16	13 – Trouet	10 – Trouet	2 – Tied	T-Mobile Center (12,477); Kansas City, MO
*Non-conference game. ^{#}Rankings from AP poll. (#) Tournament seedings in parentheses. All times are in Mountain Time.
