= Massamba Diop =

Senegalese basketball player (born 2005)

No. 35 – Gonzaga Bulldogs
- Position: Center
- League: Pac-12 Conference

Personal information
- Born: January 1, 2005 (age 21) Senegal
- Listed height: 7 ft 1 in (2.16 m)
- Listed weight: 245 lb (111 kg)

Career information
- College: Arizona State (2025–2026); Gonzaga (2026–present)

Career history
- 2022–2023: Real Madrid B
- 2023–2025: Gran Canaria B
- 2024–2025: Gran Canaria

Career highlights
- EuroLeague NextGen champion (2023)

Mor Massamba Diop (born January 1, 2005) is a Senegalese college basketball player for the Gonzaga Bulldogs of the Pac-12 Conference. He previously played for the Arizona State Sun Devils.

== Early career ==
Diop developed in the Real Madrid youth system, helping the U18 team win the 2022–23 EuroLeague NextGen Munich Qualifier and the EuroLeague NextGen Final tournament in Kaunas. He also competed on the reserve team in the fourth-tier Liga EBA during the 2022–23 season.

Diop signed with Gran Canaria in 2023. He played two seasons with the Gran Canaria reserve team in the third-tier Segunda FEB and was promoted to the senior team during the 2024–2025 season. Diop made his Liga ACB debut on October 19, 2024, coming off the bench in an 80–67 win over Bilbao. He appeared in 17 league games, averaging 1.9 points per game in limited action. Diop also played in Copa del Rey and EuroCup games, helping Gran Canaria reach the finals of the latter competition.

Diop was selected to attend the 2024 Adidas Eurocamp, where he averaged 8.3 points and 4.7 rebounds per game.

On June 17, 2025, Diop committed to playing college basketball at Arizona State University.

== College career ==
As a freshman with the Sun Devils in 2025–26, Diop averaged 13.6 points, 5.8 rebounds, and 2.1 blocks per game in 33 starts. His 69 blocks broke the program's freshman single-season record, set by Jayden Quaintance the previous year. On April 8, 2026, Diop announced he would enter the NCAA transfer portal with a "do-not-contact" tag. Soon thereafter, it was reported that he was primarily considering Gonzaga University and St. John’s University. Diop was rated as a five- and four-star transfer recruit by 247Sports and On3.com, respectively. He committed to transferring to Gonzaga on April 28, and signed a financial aid agreement with the university the following week.

== Personal life ==
Diop speaks four languages.
