= Gonzalo Bressan =

Argentine basketball player

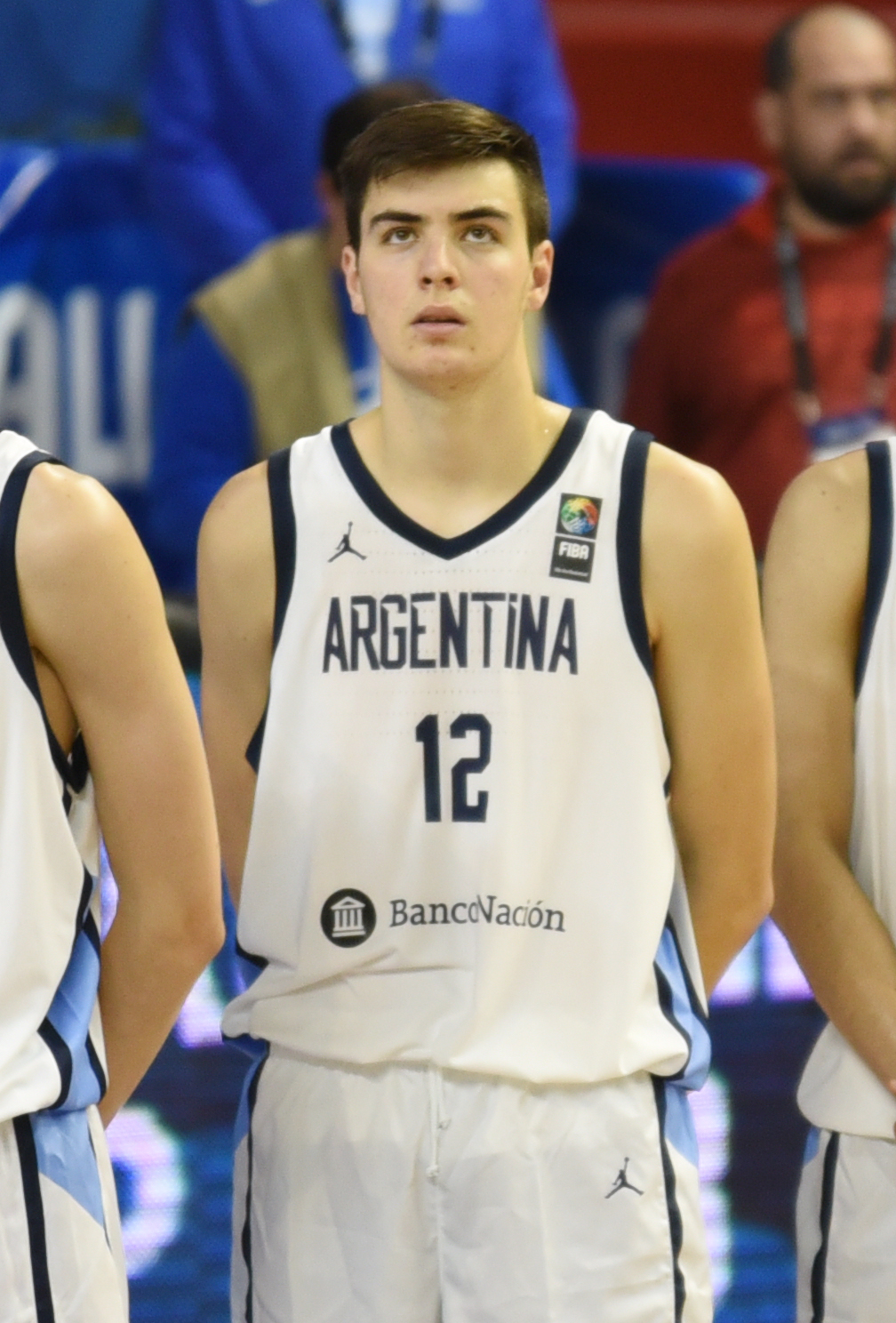
- Bressan at the 2018 FIBA Under-17 Basketball World Cup

Personal information
- Born: November 16, 2001 (age 24) Córdoba, Argentina
- Listed height: 6 ft 11 in (2.11 m)
- Listed weight: 231 lb (105 kg)

Career information
- Playing career: 2019–present
- Position: Center

Career history
- 2019–2020: CAB Estepona
- 2020–2021: Fundación CB Granada
- 2021–2023: Valencia Basket
- 2023–present: AB Castelló
Medals
Men's basketball
Representing Argentina
FIBA AmeriCup
Silver medal – second place	2025 Managua

Gonzalo Bressan (born November 16, 2001) is an Argentine professional basketball player for AB Castelló of the LEB Oro, the second division of the Spanish basketball league system.

== Professional career ==
Some of the clubs Bressan played with professionally included: CAB Estepona (2019–20), Fundación CB Granada (2020–21), Valencia Basket (2021–23), CB L'Horta Godella (2022–23) and AB Castelló (2023–present), all of them in the Spanish League.

== National team career ==
Bressan defended Argentina at the 2017 FIBA Under-16 Americas Championship and the 2018 FIBA Under-17 Basketball World Cup.
