= Agustí Sans =

Spanish basketball player

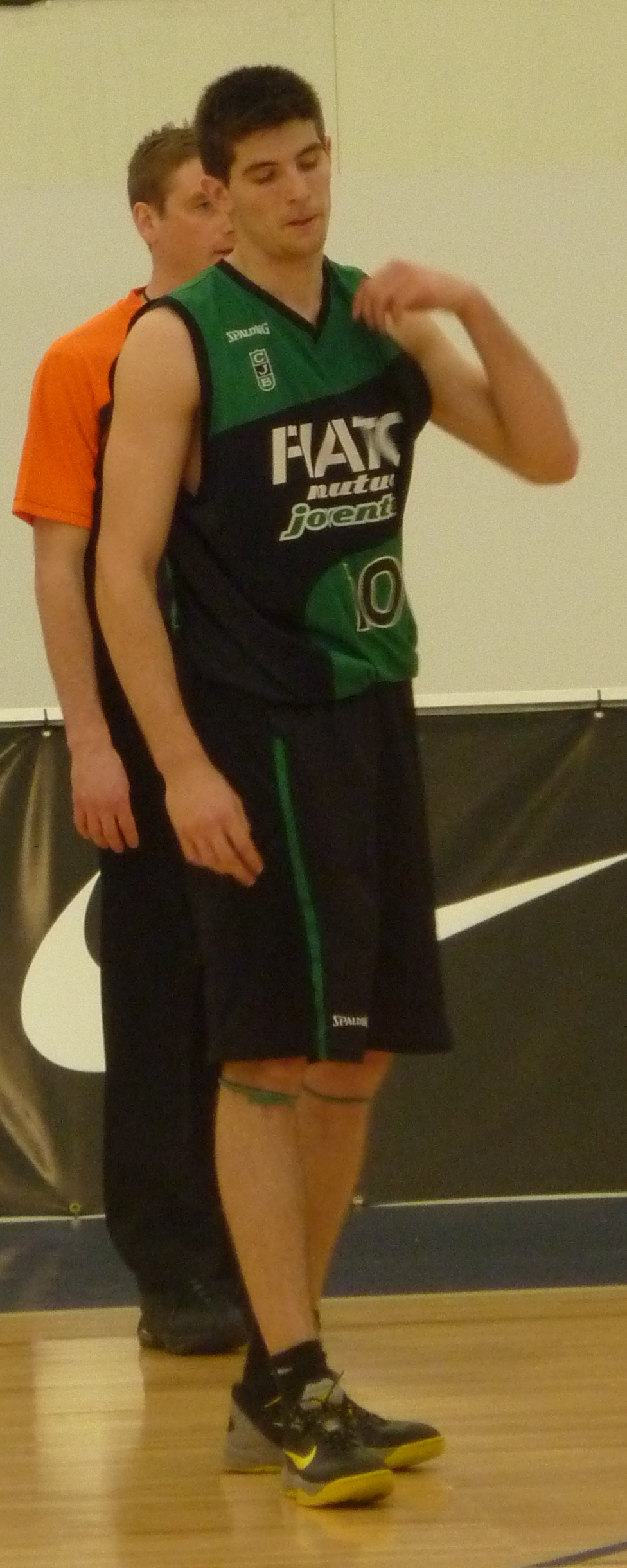
- Agusti Sans, was a Spanish basketball player.

CD Estela
- Position: Point guard
- League: LEB Plata

Personal information
- Born: 27 February 1995 (age 31) Maó, Spain
- Listed height: 1.94 m (6 ft 4 in)
- Listed weight: 180 lb (82 kg)

Career information
- NBA draft: 2017: undrafted
- Playing career: 2012–present

Career history
- 2012–2016: Joventut
- 2012–2016: →Prat
- 2016: Força Lleida
- 2016–2017: Oviedo
- 2017–2019: Huesca
- 2019–2021: Força Lleida
- 2021–: Estela

Career highlights
- Next Generation Tournament (2013); Copa Princesa de Asturias (2017)
Medals
Men's basketball
Representing Spain
U16 European Championship
Bronze medal – third place	2011 Czech Republic	Team
U18 European Championship
Bronze medal – third place	2013 Latvia	Team
U20 European Championship
Silver medal – second place	2014 Greece	Team

Agustí Sans Valls (born 27 February 1995) is a Spanish professional basketball player for CD Estela of the LEB Plata.

== Career ==
=== Joventut ===
Sans played for Sant Lluís, La Salle Mahón, Islas Baleares and Alcázar at Balearic Islands before entering the Club Joventut Badalona on 2009. A Nike International Junior Tournament champion on 2013, he scored 14 points and handing out 6 assists in the final game against FC Barcelona. Being a farm team member, he made his professional debut on 20 October 2013, playing 13 minutes for Joventut on a Liga ACB game against FC Barcelona. He played four more games between 2013–14 and 2015–16 seasons.

In September 2016, he terminated his contract, after four seasons playing for the farm team on LEB Oro and LEB Plata.

=== Força Lleida ===
On 31 October 2016, Sans signed with LEB Oro side Força Lleida. He leaves the team after 9 games.

=== Oviedo ===
On 15 December 2016, he signed with LEB Oro side Oviedo CB. He played the rest of 2016–17 season becoming Copa Princesa de Asturias champion.

=== Huesca ===
On 25 September 2017, after joining Bilbao Basket for the preseason, Sans signed with LEB Oro side CB Peñas Huesca. He spent two seasons at Huesca.

=== Força Lleida ===
On 8 July 2019, Sans returned to LEB Oro side Força Lleida.

== National team ==
Sans played for the Spanish men's national team on the 2010 FIBA Europe Under-16 Championship, winning a bronze medal on the 2011 tournament. He was a member of the national team on the 2012 FIBA Under-17 World Championship. He received a bronze medal on the 2013 FIBA Europe Under-18 Championship and silver on the 2014 FIBA Europe Under-20 Championship.
