= Wally Niang =

Senegalese basketball player

Tormes
- Position: Power forward
- League: LEB Plata

Personal information
- Born: June 5, 1996 (age 30) Dakar, Senegal
- Listed height: 6 ft 9 in (2.06 m)
- Listed weight: 220 lb (100 kg)

Career information
- NBA draft: 2017: undrafted
- Playing career: 2014–present

Career history
- 2014–2015: Estudiantes
- 2015–2016: Andorra
- 2016–2017: Long Island Nets
- 2017–2018: CB Morón
- 2018–2019: Wetterbygden Stars
- 2020–2021: Clavijo
- 2022–present: Tormes

Wally Niang (born June 5, 1996) is a Senegalese basketball player for Tormes of the LEB Plata.

== Professional career ==
Niang went undrafted for the 2016 NBA draft. On November 30, 2016, Niang was signed to the Long Island Nets, from the undrafted player pool. He scored 4 points, 4 rebounds and 1 assist in 15 minutes over the course of 5 games played.
