= CD Huelva Baloncesto =

Huelva Baloncesto
- Founded: 2008
- Arena: Palacio de los Deportes de Huelva
- Location: Huelva, Andalucia
- Team colors: White
- Website: cdhuelva.com
Home	Away

Club Deportivo Huelva Baloncesto is a basketball team based in Huelva, Andalusia, Spain.

== History ==
Huelva Baloncesto was founded in 2008 with the aim to replace the former Liga ACB team in the city, CB Ciudad de Huelva, which was dissolved due to its enormous debts.

In its first season, the club joined the fourth tier, LEB Bronce, thanks to an invitation of the Spanish Basketball Federation and finished promoting to LEB Plata. In 2010, due to a lack of sponsorship, Huelva Baloncesto resigned to continue playing in professional leagues.

== Season by season ==
Season	Tier	Division	Pos.	W–L	Cup competitions	
2008–09	4	LEB Bronce	3rd	22–12		
2009–10	3	LEB Plata	8th (Note: Resigned to continue playing in professional leagues.)	18–17	Copa LEB Plata	RU
2010–11	5	1ª División	1st	17–6		
2011–12	5	1ª División	11th	3–19		
2012–13	5	1ª División	9th	1–15		
2013–14	5	1ª División	11th	0–20		
2014–15	5	1ª División	7th	10–12		
2015–17	Did not enter any competition					
2017–18	5	1ª División	5th	11–9		
2018–19	5	1ª División	5th	16–12		
2019–20	5	1ª División	4th	12–5		
