= Garmine Kande =

Congolese basketball player

Garmine Kande Kieli
No. 34 – Fibwi Palma
- Positions: Power forward, center
- League: Primera FEB

Personal information
- Born: 24 August 1999 (age 27) Kinshasa, Democratic Republic of the Congo
- Listed height: 2.05 m (6 ft 9 in)

Career information
- Playing career: 2019–present

Career history
- 2019–2021: Aix Maurienne Savoie Basket
- 2021–2024: CB Tizona
- 2024–2026: CD Estela
- 2026–present: Fibwi Palma

Career highlights
- LEB Plata champion & Copa Princesa winner (2022) with Tizona

Garmine Kande Kieli (born 24 August 1999) is a Congolese professional basketball player for Fibwi Palma of the Spanish Primera FEB.

== Professional career ==
Kande began his professional career in France with Aix Maurienne Savoie Basket in the 2019–20 season, where he made his LNB Pro B debut.

In 2021, he signed with CB Tizona of Spain, contributing to the club’s double success (winning the LEB Plata league title and the Copa Princesa) and earning promotion to LEB Oro.

During the 2023–24 season, Kande endured a brief foot injury requiring surgery but returned to full training by November and rejoined the Tizona squad.

In July 2024, Kande moved to Grupo Alega Cantabria CBT, with CB Tizona retaining a buy-back clause in his contract.

== Contract renewal ==
In July 2025, Grupo Alega Cantabria announced the renewal of Kande’s contract through the 2026–27 season, praising his energy, rim presence, and defensive impact.

== DR Congo national team ==
He is part of the DR Congo national team at the 2025 FIBA AfroBasket. In the opening game against Cape Verde, he was the top rebounder of his team and the top shot blocker of the game.
