= Lucas Maniema =

Swiss basketball player (born 2006)

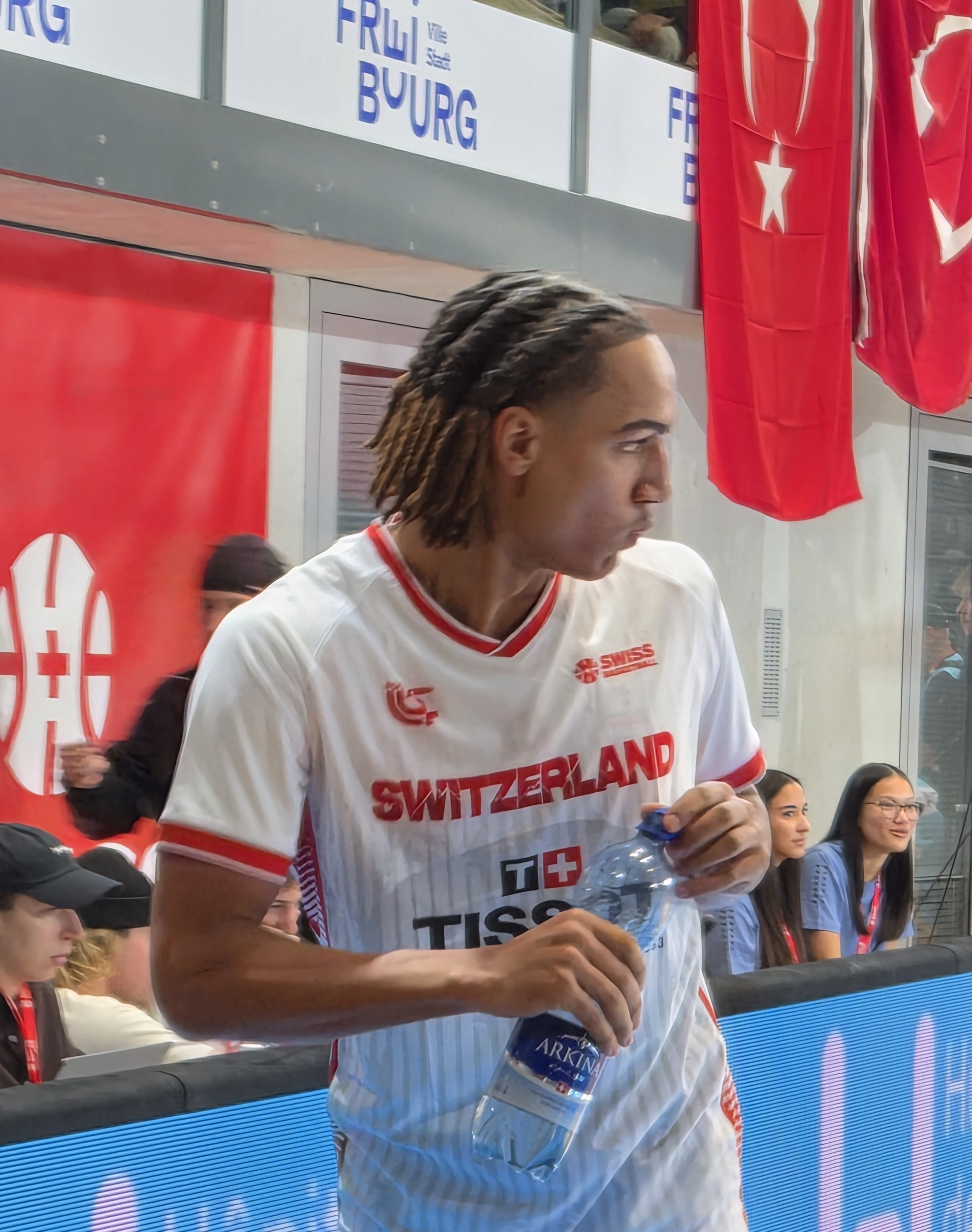
- Maniema with Switzerland in 2025

No. 10 – Mega Superbet
- Position: Guard / forward
- League: ABA League

Personal information
- Born: March 6, 2006 (age 20) Geneva, Switzerland
- Listed height: 1.93 m (6 ft 4 in)

Career information
- Playing career: 2024–present

Career history
- 2024–2026: Gran Canaria B
- 2025–2026: Dreamland Gran Canaria
- 2026–present: Mega Superbet

Lucas Nzambi Maniema (born 6 March 2006) is a Swiss basketball player for Mega Superbet of the ABA League. A 1.93 m guard, he developed in Switzerland and Spain before playing for Dreamland Gran Canaria in the Liga ACB and Basketball Champions League. In July 2026, he competed at the NBA Academy Games in Atlanta with NBA Academy Select Green, which won the tournament undefeated, before signing with Mega Superbet in August 2026. He has represented Switzerland at youth and senior international level.

== Early life and youth career ==
Born in Geneva, Maniema developed at Bernex Basket and the Genève Basketball Académie (GBA), winning the Swiss U17 national title in 2021. In 2021 he moved to Spain to enroll at Canterbury Basketball Academy in Las Palmas de Gran Canaria.

== Club Career ==
=== Gran Canaria B (2024–2025) ===
In August 2024, Maniema was listed as a reinforcement for Gran Canaria's Segunda FEB affiliate after finishing at Canterbury. In 2024–25 he played 26 league games and averaged 9.3 points, 2.5 rebounds and 2.4 assists in 26.4 minutes, shooting .468/.321/.704. On 11 January 2025 at Class Bàsquet Sant Antoni he scored 16 points in an 88–79 road loss.

=== Dreamland Gran Canaria (2025–2026) ===
On 4 August 2025, Gran Canaria confirmed first-team shirt numbers for the 2025–26 season, assigning Maniema number 1. In an August 2025 club interview, he said he would continue working to earn opportunities with the senior side while also competing in the newly created Liga U competition.

As of July 2026, Maniema had appeared in 19 Liga ACB games for Dreamland Gran Canaria, averaging 0.7 points, 0.4 rebounds and 0.1 assists in 3:06 minutes per game.

He also appeared in 8 games in the 2025–26 Basketball Champions League, averaging 2.1 points, 0.6 rebounds and 1.1 assists per game for Gran Canaria.

He also featured for Gran Canaria's U22 / Liga U side during the 2025–26 season, averaging 15.4 points, 3.3 rebounds and 4.3 assists in 8 games.

=== NBA Academy Games ===
In July 2026, Maniema was selected for the NBA Academy Games in Atlanta, Georgia, as a member of NBA Academy Select Green, wearing number 10. He played all six games from 15 to 19 July, starting three, and averaged 10.7 points, 3.3 rebounds and 3.0 assists per game.

NBA Academy Select Green finished first in its group and went on to win the tournament undefeated. The team defeated NBA Academy Select Blue 80–78 in its final game on 19 July.

=== Mega Superbet (2026–present) ===
On 18 August 2026, Serbian club Mega Superbet announced the signing of Maniema ahead of the 2026–27 season. In its announcement, Mega noted his development in Switzerland and Spain, his appearances for the senior Switzerland national team and his participation in the 2026 NBA Academy Games in Atlanta.

== Press coverage ==
- The local newspaper La Provincia highlighted Maniema and Fynn Schott as the “new sap” of the 2025–26 roster, noting his speed, defensive instinct and development as a point guard.
- An EFE wire reported that coach Jaka Lakovic brought Maniema and Schott into the first-team dynamic for preseason in August 2025.

== National team career ==
Maniema has represented Switzerland at U16, U18 and U19 levels.

He has also appeared for the senior Switzerland national team in the 2027 FIBA Basketball World Cup European pre-qualifiers and qualifiers. In the pre-qualifiers, he played against Kosovo on 23 February 2025 and recorded 5 points, 1 rebound and 1 assist in 6 minutes.

As of July 2026, in the European qualifiers he had appeared in 4 games, averaging 5.3 points, 1.3 rebounds and 1.8 assists per game. On 30 November 2025, against Turkey, he recorded 5 points, 2 rebounds and 3 assists in 16 minutes. On 27 February 2026, against Bosnia and Herzegovina, he posted 10 points, 2 rebounds and 2 assists in 33 minutes. On 2 March 2026, again against Bosnia and Herzegovina, he had 2 points, 1 rebound, 3 turnovers, 2 steals and 1 block in 19 minutes. On 6 July 2026, against Turkey, he recorded 4 points and 2 assists in 13 minutes.

== Playing style ==
Versatile wing/guard noted for slashing, secondary creation, and activity in transition and defense; La Provincia described him as a speedy player with a good first step and strong defensive instincts, with room to improve his game management and outside shooting.

== Career statistics ==
=== Club ===
Club
Season	Team	League	GP	MPG	PPG	RPG	APG	FG%	3P%	FT%	Source
2024–25	Gran Canaria B	Segunda FEB	26	26.4	9.3	2.5	2.4	.468	.321	.704	
2025–26	Dreamland Gran Canaria	Liga ACB	19	3.1	0.7	0.4	0.1	.600	.000	.583	
2025–26	Dreamland Gran Canaria	Basketball Champions League	8	9.0	2.1	0.6	1.1	.462	.167	.667	
2025–26	Gran Canaria U22	Liga U	8	29.9	15.4	3.3	4.3	.524	.367	.867	

=== National team ===
National team
Tournament	Team	GP	MPG	PPG	RPG	APG	EFF	Source
2027 FIBA World Cup European pre-qualifiers	Switzerland	1	6.0	5.0	1.0	1.0	3.0	
2027 FIBA World Cup European qualifiers	Switzerland	4	20.0	5.3	1.3	1.8	5.3	
2025 FIBA U19 Basketball World Cup	Switzerland U19	7	—	7.7	4.0	5.0	7.4	
2024 FIBA U18 EuroBasket Division B	Switzerland U18	8	—	10.8	3.6	3.6	11.3	
2023 FIBA U18 European Championship Division B	Switzerland U18	7	—	7.4	4.7	2.0	9.0	
2022 FIBA U16 European Championship Division B	Switzerland U16	6	—	7.5	4.3	2.0	10.3	

== Honours ==
=== Genève Basketball Académie ===
- Swiss U17 Championship: 2021

=== NBA Academy Select Green ===
- NBA Academy Games: 2026
