= Francis Alonso =

Spanish basketball player (born 1996)

No. 10 – CB Breogán
- Position: Shooting guard
- League: Liga ACB

Personal information
- Born: 25 May 1996 (age 30) Málaga, Spain
- Listed height: 6 ft 3 in (1.91 m)
- Listed weight: 185 lb (84 kg)

Career information
- High school: Cushing Academy (Ashburnham, Massachusetts)
- College: UNC Greensboro (2015–2019)
- NBA draft: 2019: undrafted
- Playing career: 2019–present

Career history
- 2013–2014: Axarquía
- 2019–2022: Unicaja Málaga
- 2019–2020: → Fuenlabrada
- 2020: → Oviedo
- 2022–2023: Bilbao
- 2023–2025: Estudiantes
- 2025–present: CB Breogán

Career highlights
- 2× First-team All-SoCon (2018, 2019); Second-team All-SoCon (2017); SoCon Tournament MOP (2018); SoCon All-Freshman Team (2016)
Medals
Men's basketball
Representing Spain
FIBA U20 European Championship
Gold medal – first place	2016 Finland	Team
Silver medal – second place	2015 Italy	Team

Francisco Fernando Alonso Martínez (born 25 May 1996) is a Spanish professional basketball player for CB Breogán of the Spanish Liga ACB. He played college basketball for the UNC Greensboro Spartans.

== Early life and career ==
Alonso was born and brought up in Málaga, Spain. The son of former basketball player and coach Paco Alonso, he began playing basketball from a young age. He played youth basketball for Unicaja Málaga and competed for Clinicas Rincón Axarquía. Alonso became friends with his Unicaja teammate Domantas Sabonis, a future NBA All-Star. At age 18, he moved to the United States to attend Cushing Academy, a private boarding school in Ashburnham, Massachusetts. In his only season at the school, Alonso averaged 17.0 points, 6.5 assists and three rebounds per game, leading his team to an 18–8 record and the New England Preparatory School Athletic Council quarterfinals. He committed to UNC Greensboro over offers from Virginia, Elon, South Florida, Iona, Western Kentucky, and Richmond.

== College career ==
Before Alonso arrived at UNC Greensboro, the team had endure seven consecutive losing seasons. He primarily functioned as a catch-and-shoot perimeter scorer as a freshman. He led the team in scording during his freshman season at 13.0 points per game. As a sophomore, Alonso averaged 14.9 points and 2.0 assists per game for a team that reached the NIT. He was named to the Second Team All-Southern Conference. As a junior, Alonso averaged 15.6 points and 2.9 rebounds per game in leading the team to the NCAA Tournament. He scored a career-high 31 points in the quarterfinals of the conference tournament versus Samford. He was named to the First Team All-SoCon and was named most outstanding player of the conference tournament. On February 28, 2019, Alonso became the second player in school history to surpass 2,000 career points, finishing with 18 points in a 100–96 win over The Citadel. As a senior, Alonso averaged 17.6 points, 2.5 assists and 2.3 rebounds per game, shooting 37.1 percent from three-point range. He was named to the First Team All-SoCon alongside teammate Isaiah Miller.

== Professional career ==
On 26 July 2019, Alonso signed a two-year contract with an option for a third year with Unicaja Málaga of the Liga ACB. He was immediately loaned to ACB club Montakit Fuenlabrada for his first season. About one month into the season, Alonso suffered an ankle injury at the Supercopa de España and initially attempted to play through it. He had edema in his joint and missed about five months of action while recovering. Alonso played three games for Fuenlabrada, averaging 1.7 points per game, before being loaned to Liberbank Oviedo Baloncesto of the LEB Oro. On 7 March 2020, Alonso recorded a season-high 31 points, seven rebounds and five assists in an 88–70 win over Leyma Básquet Coruña. He later rejoined Unicaja. On 8 June, Alonso announced that he had tested positive for COVID-19.

On June 24, 2025, he signed with CB Breogán of the Spanish Liga ACB.

== National team career ==
Alonso represented Spain during the 2016 FIBA U20 European Championship in Helsinki, Finland. He helped the team to a 68–55 victory over Lithuania in the championship game. Alonso averaged 13.0 points, 3.7 assists and 3.4 rebounds per game and was named to the Championship's All-Star Five team.
