= Gonzalo Corbalán =

Argentine basketball player (born 2002)

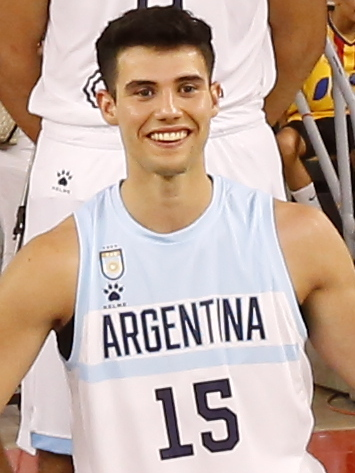

No. 20 – Valencia Basket
- Position: Small forward / shooting guard
- League: Liga ACB; EuroLeague

Personal information
- Born: 3 March 2002 (age 24) Resistencia, Chaco, Argentina
- Listed height: 1.93 m (6 ft 4 in)
- Listed weight: 88 kg (194 lb)

Career information
- High school: Las Cruces High School (Las Cruces, New Mexico)
- Playing career: 2021–present

Career history
- 2021–2026: San Pablo Burgos
- 2026–present: Valencia

Career highlights
- All-Liga ACB Second Team (2026)
Medals
Men's basketball
Representing Argentina
FIBA AmeriCup
Silver medal – second place	2025 Managua

Gonzalo Corbalán (born 3 March 2002) is an Argentine professional basketball player for Valencia Basket of the Liga ACB and the EuroLeague. He was instrumental in Burgos's ascent to the ACB and has emerged as a rising star in Spanish basketball.

== Professional career ==
=== San Pablo Burgos (2021–2026) ===
Corbalán joined the San Pablo Burgos in the summer of 2021, initially integrating into their Liga EBA-level affiliate before earning promotion to the first team in 2022–23. Since then, he has been a fixture in the squad across the LEB Oro and Primera FEB competitions.

In the 2024–25 campaign, Corbalán averaged 13.4 points, 3.6 rebounds, and 1.9 assists over 42 games, combining for a standout 17.1 performance index—playing a leading role in Burgos's triumph in the Spain Cup and their promotion to the ACB.

Notably, Corbalán was named MVP of Round 8 in the Primera FEB after producing 21 points, 4 assists, and 2 steals in a closely contested game against Real Betis.

In April 2025, Corbalán delivered a dominant performance in the Spain Cup final, scoring 14 points in the third quarter as Burgos defeated Obradoiro 97–69 to win the title.

=== Valencia Basket (2026–present) ===
On July 3, 2026, he signed with Valencia of the Spanish Liga ACB and the EuroLeague.

== International career ==
Corbalán represented Argentina at the 2021 FIBA U19 World Cup, where he averaged 12.9 points, 4.6 rebounds, and 2.0 assists over seven games, ranking among the squad's top performers.

In 2025, he made his senior debut with the Argentina national team during the 2025 FIBA AmeriCup qualification, contributing 8.5 points, 2.2 rebounds, and 2.0 assists per game across six appearances.
