= Coliseum Burgos =

Indoor arena in Burgos, Spain

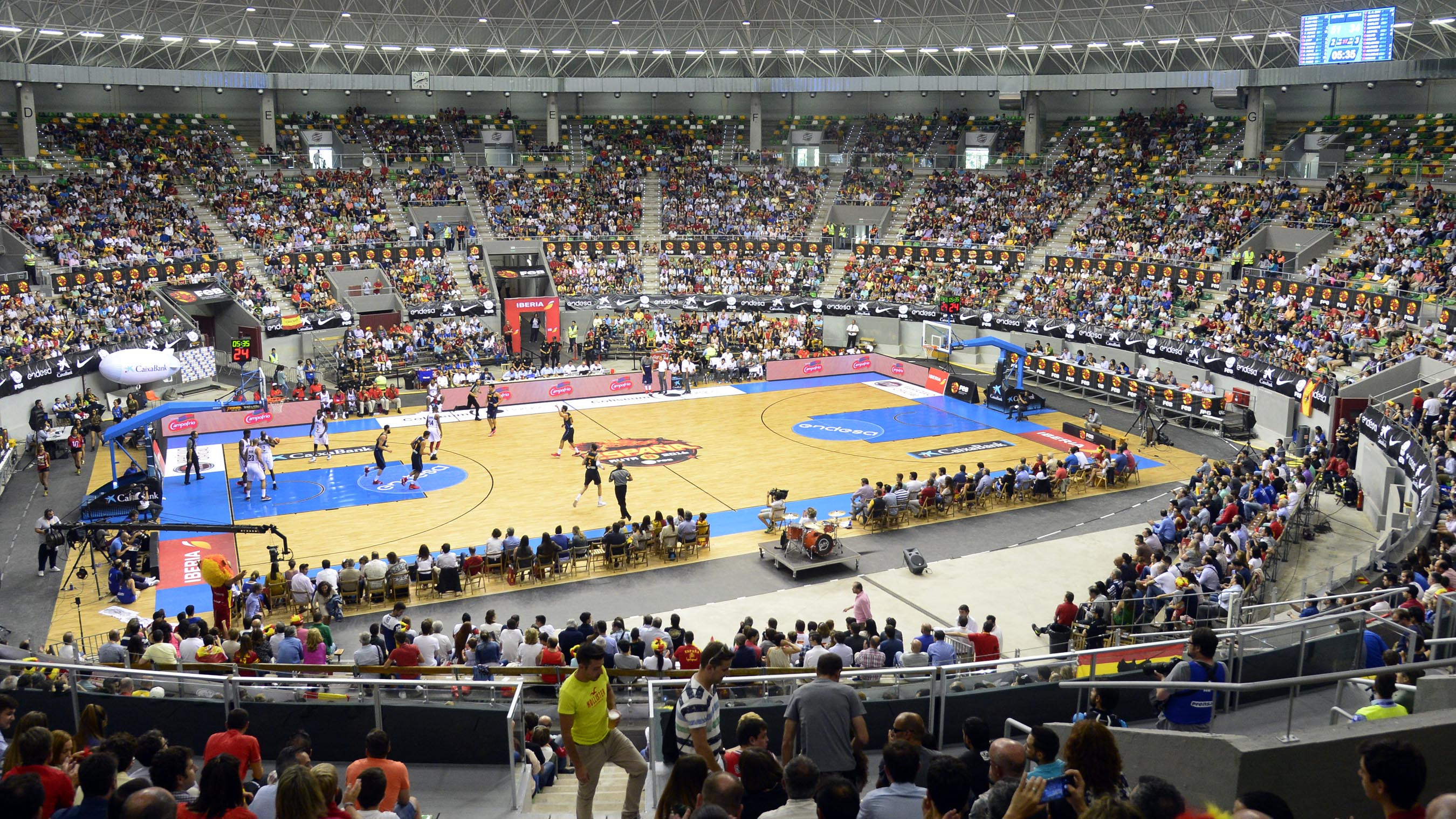
- Interactive map of Coliseum Burgos
- Former names: Plaza de Toros de Burgos (1967–2015)
- Location: c/ Chopera, s/n Burgos, Spain
- Coordinates: 42.34442°N 3.678419°W
- Owner: City Council of Burgos
- Capacity: Basketball: 9,604
- Record attendance: 9,583 (San Pablo Burgos v Joventut, 18 January 2020)

Construction
- Groundbreaking: 18 October 1966
- Built: 18 June 1967
- Opened: June 28, 1967; 59 years ago
- Renovated: 2015
- Cost: 27,296,037.79 pts (164,052.50 €)
- Architect: Fernando Obregón Ansorena

Tenant
- San Pablo Burgos (2017–present)

The Coliseum Burgos, formerly named as Plaza de Toros de Burgos, is an indoor arena mainly used as bullring located in Burgos, Spain.

It is a Spanish bullring originally opened in 1967 and remodelled in 2015 to serve as a multi-purpose arena (bullfighting, sports, concerts and other activities). It initially had a capacity of more than 12,000 spectators and, after the remodelling, the capacity currently varies depending on the use of the facility, up to a maximum of almost 9,500 people.

== History ==
=== Plaza de Toros de Burgos (1967–2015) ===
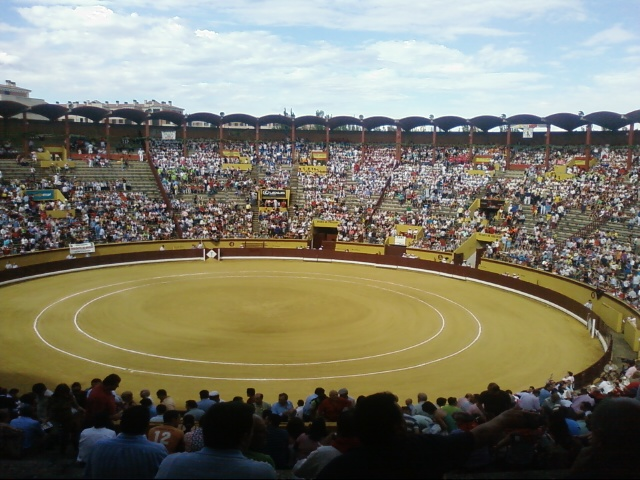
Before a bullfight in 2009.

Built between 1966 and 1967, the bullring was inaugurated on 28 June 1967 with a corrida by Jaime Ostos, El Cordobés and Tinín.

In 1975, the bullring hosted the first pop music festival in Spain, known as La Cochambre, including performances of several Spanish bands.

Its façade had three big doors and a bullring was able for a capacity for 12,277 spectators.

=== Coliseum Burgos (2015–present) ===
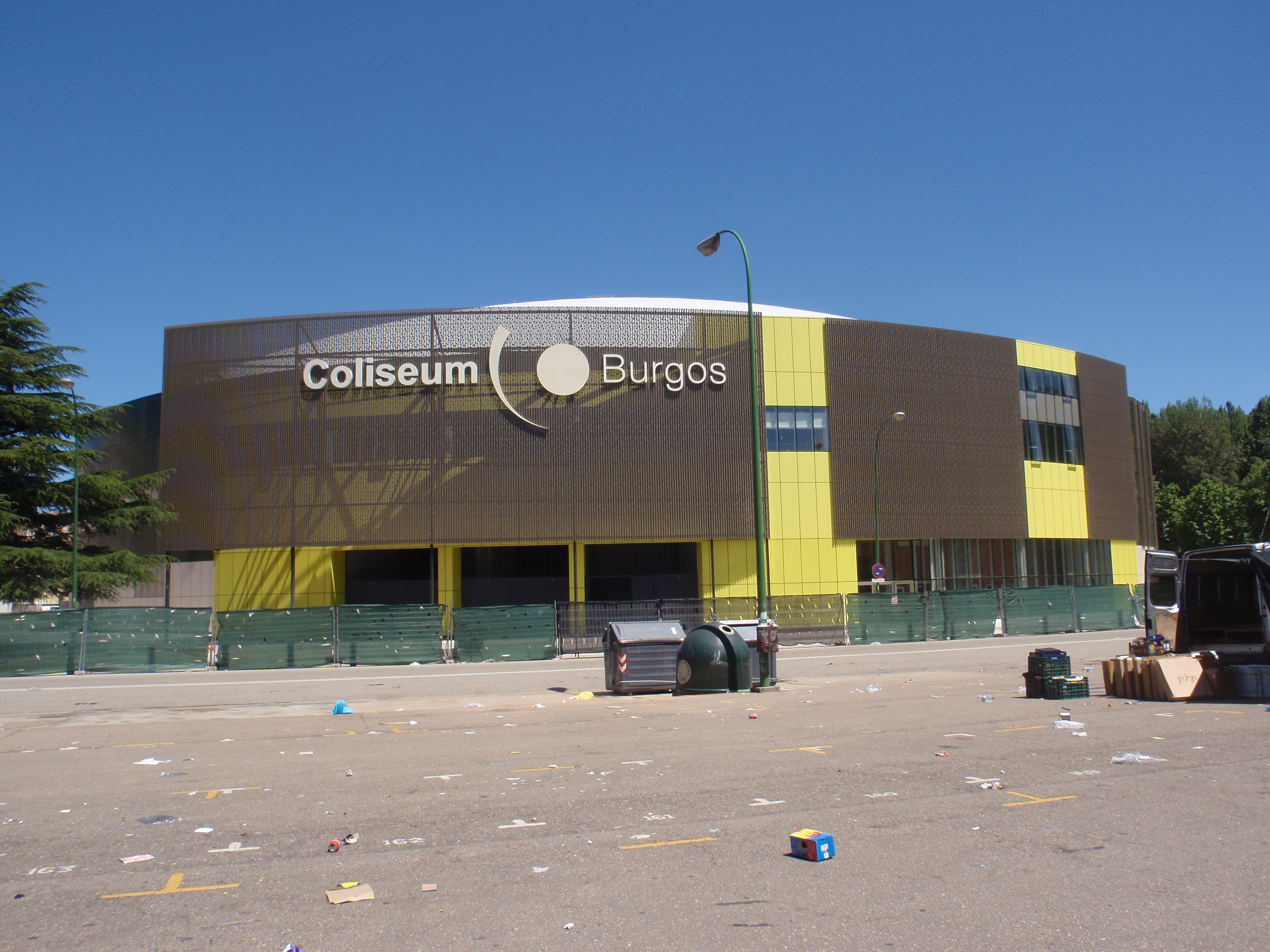
Façade of the Coliseum after its renovation.

In 2013, mayor Javier Lacalle announced the intention of building a new indoor arena due to the risk of collapse of the bullring, but due to its high costs, the solution was to integrally renovate the bullring and to add a roof.

The renovation finished in 2015 and the arena was re-inaugurated on 27 June 2015 with the first corrida of the 2015 local season, with bullfighters Enrique Ponce, El Juli and Alejandro Talavante.

On 18 August 2015, the Spain national team played its inaugural match in the arena. It was a friendly game against Venezuela. One year later, Spain would play again in the Coliseum, this time against Angola.

In 2017, after the promotion of local basketball club San Pablo Burgos to the Spanish top league, it started to play their home matches at the Coliseum. The first official match was played on 1 October 2017 and ended with a loss of the host team against Iberostar Tenerife by 65–81, in front of 8,817 spectators.

On 26 November 2017, the arena hosted the 2019 World Cup qualifier match between Spain and European champions Slovenia, where the locals won by 92–84.

== Attendances ==
This is a list of games attendances of San Pablo Burgos at Coliseum Burgos.

Liga ACB					European competitions				
Season	Total	High	Low	Average	Season	Total	High	Low	Average
2017–18 ACB	154,196	9,352	8,531	9,070					
2018–19 ACB	155,605	9,316	8,825	9,153					
2019–20 ACB (Note: Last five regular season games were not played due to the COVID-19 pandemic.)	113,258	9,583	9,214	9,438	2019–20 BCL (Note: Round of 16 game against Dinamo Sassari was played behind closed doors due to the COVID-19 pandemic.)	72,700	9,326	8,769	9,088
2020–21 ACB	Season played behind closed doors				2020–21 BCL	Season played behind closed doors			
2021–22 ACB (Note: Some games were played under limited attendance.)	133,795	9,568	3,550	7,870	2021–22 BCL	28,537	7,415	4,412	5,707
2022–23 LEB Oro	160,820	9,493	7,295	8,934					
2023–24 LEB Oro	162,971	9,388	7,687	8,577					
2024–25 1.ª FEB	150,064	9,584	7,917	8,827					
2025–26 ACB	153,136	9,357	8,579	9,008					

== See also ==
- List of indoor arenas in Spain
