= List of basketball clubs in Spain =

This is a list of basketball clubs in Spain. Currently the governing body of basketball in Spain is the Spanish Basketball Federation (FEB), which is in charge of its national teams and its leagues, with the highest one being Liga ACB. FEB was founded in 1923 and is a member of both FIBA and FIBA Europe.

== Men's basketball ==
=== Overview ===
Location of Spanish teams in 2026–27 season
Liga ACB; Primera FEB; Segunda FEB.
Location of teams from Barcelona in 2026–27 season
Location of teams from Madrid in 2026–27 season
Location of teams from the Canary Islands in 2026–27 season

=== Liga ACB ===
Team	Home city	Arena	Capacity	Season	Last season
Valencia Basket	Valencia	Roig Arena	15,600	38th	1st place, gold medalist(s)
Barça	Barcelona	Palau Blaugrana	7,786	44th	2nd
Asisa Joventut	Badalona	Palau Municipal d'Esports	12,760	44th	3rd
La Laguna Tenerife	San Cristóbal de La Laguna	Santiago Martín	5,100	22nd	4th
Real Madrid	Madrid	Movistar Arena	13,109	44th	5th
Kosner Baskonia	Vitoria-Gasteiz	Buesa Arena	15,504	44th	6th
UCAM Murcia	Murcia	Palacio de Deportes	7,454	29th	7th
Surne Bilbao	Bilbao	Bilbao Arena	10,014	22nd	8th
Unicaja	Málaga	Martín Carpena	10,699	42nd	9th
Kids&Us Manresa	Manresa	Nou Congost	5,000	39th	10th
Río Breogán	Lugo	Pazo dos Deportes	5,310	24th	11th
FIATC Girona	Girona	Fontajau	5,500	5th	12th
Recoletas Salud San Pablo Burgos	Burgos	Coliseum Burgos	9,604	7th	13th
iLERNA Lleida	Lleida	Espai Fruita Barris Nord	6,100	3rd	14th
Casademont Zaragoza	Zaragoza	Pabellón Príncipe Felipe	10,744	18th	15th
MoraBanc Andorra	Andorra la Vella	Pavelló Toni Martí	5,001	16th	16th
Monbus Obradoiro	Santiago de Compostela	Multiusos Fontes do Sar	6,000	15th	▲1st (1ª FEB)
Leyma Coruña	A Coruña	Coliseum da Coruña	9,300	2nd	▲2nd (1ª FEB)

=== Primera FEB ===
Team	Home city	Arena	Capacity	Season	Last season
Cajasiete Gran Canaria	Las Palmas	Gran Canaria Arena	9,870	1st	▼17th (ACB)
Covirán Granada	Granada	Palacio de Deportes	8,100	5th	▼18th (ACB)
Movistar Estudiantes	Madrid	Movistar Arena	13,109	6th	3rd
Movistar Estudiantes	Madrid	Movistar Academy Magariños	600	6th	3rd
Iberolea Palencia	Palencia	Municipal de Deportes	5,012	17th	4th
Alimerka Oviedo Baloncesto	Oviedo	Palacio de los Deportes	5,340	14th	5th
Inveready Askatuak Gipuzkoa	San Sebastián	Amenabar Arena	11,000	10th	6th
Partizán de Fuenlabrada	Fuenlabrada	Fernando Martín	5,700	6th	7th
Bàsquet Menorca	Mahón	Pavelló Menorca	5,115	4th	8th
HLA Alicante	Alicante	Pedro Ferrándiz	5,696	8th	9th
Caja Rural CB Zamora	Zamora	Ángel Nieto	1,500	3rd	10th
Grupo Alega Cantabria	Torrelavega	Vicente Trueba	2,688	5th	11th
Club Ourense Baloncesto	Ourense	Pazo Paco Paz	5,500	22nd	12th
Grupo Ureta Tizona Burgos	Burgos	Polideportivo El Plantío	2,432	7th	13th
Fibwi Mallorca Bàsquet Palma	Palma	Son Moix	3,800	10th	14th
Palmer Basket Mallorca Palma	Palma	Son Moix	3,800	2nd	15th
Cajasol Coto Córdoba	Córdoba	Vista Alegre	3,500	1st	▲1st (2ª FEB)
Insolac Caja'87	Seville	San Pablo	7,242	1st	▲2nd (2ª FEB)
Bueno Arenas Albacete Basket	Albacete	El Parque	1,000	2nd	▲3rd (2ª FEB)

=== Segunda FEB ===
Team	Home city	Arena	Season	Last season
La Salud Cartagena CB	Cartagena	Palacio de Deportes	4th	▼16th (1ª FEB)
Melilla Ciudad del Deporte	Melilla	Javier Imbroda Ortiz	2nd	▼17th (1ª FEB)
Amics Castelló	Castellón de la Plana	Ciutat de Castelló	9th	4th
Class Bàsquet Sant Antoni	Sant Antoni de Portmany	Sa Pedrera	6th	5th
Biele ISB	Azpeitia	Municipal	14th	6th
Spanish Basketball Academy	Alcorcón	SBA Arena	2nd	7th
CB Starlabs Morón	Morón de la Frontera	Alameda	11th	8th
Club Esportiu Bàsquet Llíria	Llíria	Pla del Arc	5th	9th
UEMC Baloncesto Valladolid	Valladolid	Polideportivo Pisuerga	4th	10th
Proinbeni UPB Gandia	Gandia	Municipal	4th	11th
Reina Proteínas Clavijo	Logroño	Palacio de los Deportes	16th	12th
Clínica Ponferrada SDP	Ponferrada	Pabellón Lydia Valentín	8th	13th
Lobe Tu Provincia Huesca La Magia	Huesca	Palacio Municipal de Huesca	10th	14th
Cáceres Patrimonio de la Humanidad	Cáceres	Multiusos Ciudad de Cáceres	6th	15th
CB Zaragoza	Zaragoza	Siglo XXI	2nd	16th
CB Toledo Basket	Toledo	Javier Lozano Cid	2nd	17th
CB Getafe	Getafe	Juan de la Cierva	4th	18th
Cultural y Deportiva Leonesa	León	Palacio de los Deportes	3rd	19th
Sol Gironès Bisbal Bàsquet	La Bisbal d'Empordà	Municipal	3rd	20th
Intermaquinas Benicarló	Benicarló	Pavelló Poliesportiu Municipal	8th	21th
LogroBasket Logi7	Logroño	Lobete	2nd	22th
Vidal Golosinas Ciudad Molina Basket	Molina de Segura	Serrerías	2nd	23th
IREN BCBadajoz	Badajoz	La Granadilla	1st	▲1st (3ª FEB)
TQ-CB Prat	El Prat de Llobregat	Pavelló Joan Busquets	14th	▲2nd (3ª FEB)
Movistar Estudiantes B	Madrid	Movistar Academy Magariños	1st	▲3rd (3ª FEB)
Jaén Paraíso Interior FS	Jaén	Olivo Arena	1st	▲4th (3ª FEB)
CB Algeciras	Algeciras	Doctor Juan Carlos Mateo	1st	▲5th (3ª FEB)
CB Tres Cantos	Tres Cantos	La Luz	1st	▲6th (3ª FEB)

== Women's basketball ==
=== Liga Femenina ===
Location of teams in 2026–27 Liga Femenina

Team	Home city	Arena	Capacity
Azulmarino Mallorca Palma	Palma de Mallorca	Son Moix	4,000
Baxi Ferrol	Ferrol	A Malata	3,700
Cadí La Seu	La Seu d'Urgell	Palau d'Esports	800
Casademont Zaragoza	Zaragoza	Pabellón Príncipe Felipe	10,744
Celta Femxa Zorka	Vigo	Navia	1,500
Durán Maquinaria Ensino	Lugo	Pazo dos Deportes	5,310
Hozono Global Jairis	Alcantarilla	Fausto Vicent	1,240
Impulso 360 Estepona	Estepona	Pineda Lobilla	200
Innova-tsn Leganés	Leganés	Europa	4,254
Inversus Gernika Bizkaia	Gernika	Maloste	800
Kutxabank Araski	Vitoria-Gasteiz	Mendizorrotza	2,603
Mirai Euskotren	San Sebastián	José Antonio Gasca	2,500
Meins Avenida	Salamanca	Würzburg	3,000
Movistar Estudiantes	Madrid	Antonio Magariños	600
Spar Girona	Girona	Fontajau	5,200
Valencia Basket	Valencia	Roig Arena	15,600

== See also ==
- Basketball in Spain
