= 2025–26 Spain Cup =

Spanish basketball cup competition

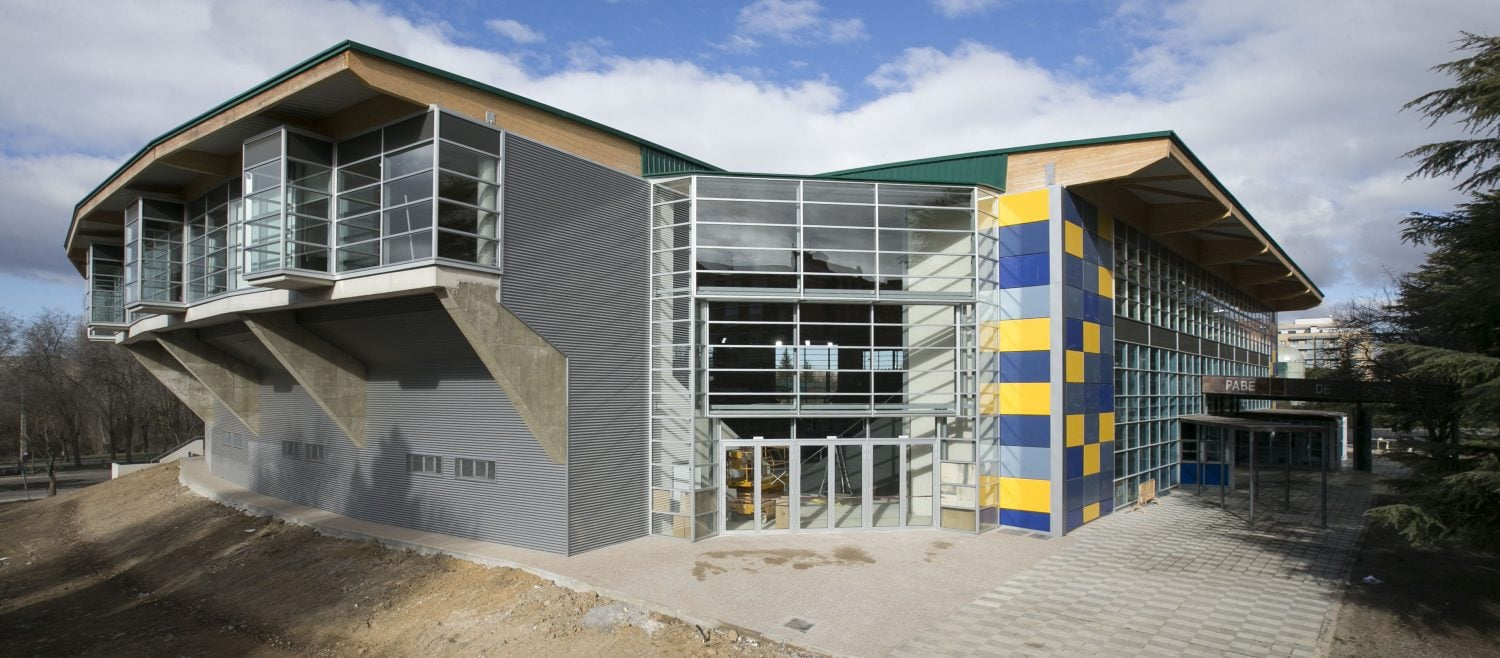
- The Municipal de Deportes of Palencia hosted the Final Four.

Tournament details
- Country: Spain
- City: Palencia
- Venue: Municipal de Deportes
- Dates: 13 September 2025 – 25 January 2026
- Teams: 45

Final positions
- Champions: Movistar Estudiantes (1st title)
- Runners-up: Súper Agropal Palencia
- Semifinalists: Cloud.gal Ourense Baloncesto; Flexicar Fuenlabrada

Tournament statistics
- Matches played: 73

Awards
- MVP: Lotanna Nwogbo (Movistar Estudiantes)

The 2025–26 Spain Cup was the 2nd edition of the Spain Cup, a men's basketball competition created with the aim to replace the Copa Princesa de Asturias and the Copa LEB Plata. It was played by all teams competing in the 2025–26 season of the Primera FEB and the Segunda FEB.

Movistar Estudiantes accomplished its first Spain Cup title becoming in its third cup title in the last five seasons. CB Starlabs Morón finished as the top ranked team of the Segunda FEB after reaching the quarter-finals which served them to achieve an honorary title endowed with €15,000.

Across mainland Spain, match times up to 25 October 2025 are CEST (UTC+2) and from 26 October 2025 are CET (UTC+1).

== Schedule and format ==
On 1 June 2025, the Spanish Basketball Federation introduced changes in the format of the competition, which was expanded to open participation to all teams from Primera FEB and Segunda FEB. It began with a preliminary group stage in which all teams from Segunda FEB are divided into seven groups of four teams. At the end of the group stage, the 15 top teams joined the knockout phase alongside all teams from Primera FEB in a sudden-death phase where the four winners concluded at a Final Four.

Schedule for 2025–26 Spain Cup
Phase	Round	Draw date	Round date
Group stage	Matchday 1	1 August 2025	13–14 September 2025
Group stage	Matchday 2	1 August 2025	20–21 September 2025
Group stage	Matchday 3	1 August 2025	26–30 September 2025
Knockout phase	Round of 32	2 October 2025	21–22 October 2025
Knockout phase	Round of 16	2 October 2025	18–19 November 2025
Knockout phase	Quarter-finals	2 October 2025	7 January 2026
Final Four	Semi-finals	2 October 2025	24 January 2026
Final Four	Final	2 October 2025	25 January 2026

== Qualified teams ==
Location of teams in 2025–26 Spain Cup.
Primera FEB: Orange.
Segunda FEB: Brown: Group A; Red: Group B; Yellow: Group C;
Green: Group D; Blue: Group E; Purple: Group F; Pink: Group G.
Location of teams from Madrid in 2025–26 Spain Cup.
Primera FEB: Orange.
Segunda FEB: Pink: Group G.

The following teams qualified for the competition.

Primera FEB
- Alimerka Oviedo Baloncesto
- Caja Rural CB Zamora
- Cloud.gal Ourense Baloncesto
- Fibwi Mallorca Bàsquet Palma
- Flexicar Fuenlabrada
- Grupo Alega Cantabria
- Grupo Caesa Seguros FC Cartagena CB
- Grupo Ureta Tizona Burgos
- Hestia Menorca
- HLA Alicante
- Inveready Gipuzkoa
- Leyma Coruña
- Melilla Ciudad del Deporte
- Monbus Obradoiro
- Movistar Estudiantes
- Palmer Basket Mallorca Palma
- Súper Agropal Palencia
Segunda FEB
Group A
- Biele ISB
- Castillo de Gorraiz Valle de Egüés
- LogroBasket Logi7
- Reina Proteínas Clavijo
Group B
- Círculo Gijón
- Clínica Ponferrada SDP
- Cultural y Deportiva Leonesa
- UEMC CBC Valladolid
Group C
- CB Starlabs Morón
- Coto Córdoba CB
- Insolac Caja'87
- Jaén Paraíso Interior CB
Group D
- Bueno Arenas Albacete Basket
- CEB Llíria
- Ciudad Molina Basket
- Proinbeni UPB Gandia
Group E
- CB Zaragoza
- Lobe Huesca La Magia
- OCA Global CB Salou
- Sol Gironès Bisbal Bàsquet
Group F
- Amics Castelló
- Class Bàsquet Sant Antoni
- Homs UE Mataró
- Maderas Sorlí Benicarló
Group G
- Cáceres Patrimonio de la Humanidad
- CB Getafe
- CB Toledo Basket
- Spanish Basketball Academy

== Group stage ==
The group stage, which had a total of 28 teams from the Segunda FEB, consisted of seven groups of four teams in each group that had been configured according to criteria of geographical distribution. In each group, each team played three matches over three matchdays of competition. The matchdays were played throughout the last three weekends of September prior to the start of the Segunda FEB. At the end of the group stage, the 15 top teams advanced for the knockout phase.

=== Table ===
Pos	Team	Pld	W	L	PF	PA	PD	Pts	Qualification
1	Class Bàsquet Sant Antoni	3	3	0	278	215	+63	6	Qualification to round of 32
2	Proinbeni UPB Gandia	3	3	0	262	203	+59	6	Qualification to round of 32
3	CB Starlabs Morón	3	3	0	252	212	+40	6	Qualification to round of 32
4	Lobe Huesca La Magia	3	3	0	271	234	+37	6	Qualification to round of 32
5	Reina Proteínas Clavijo	3	3	0	236	202	+34	6	Qualification to round of 32
6	Cultural y Deportiva Leonesa	3	3	0	266	242	+24	6	Qualification to round of 32
7	CB Zaragoza	3	2	1	249	212	+37	5	Qualification to round of 32
8	Amics Castelló	3	2	1	260	230	+30	5	Qualification to round of 32
9	Coto Córdoba CB	3	2	1	245	224	+21	5	Qualification to round of 32
10	LogroBasket Logi7	3	2	1	221	205	+16	5	Qualification to round of 32
11	UEMC CBC Valladolid	3	2	1	269	258	+11	5	Qualification to round of 32
12	CB Toledo Basket	3	2	1	205	197	+8	5	Qualification to round of 32
13	Cáceres Patrimonio de la Humanidad	3	2	1	222	222	0	5	Qualification to round of 32
14	Biele ISB	3	1	2	214	201	+13	4	Qualification to round of 32
15	Bueno Arenas Albacete Basket	3	1	2	248	238	+10	4	Qualification to round of 32
16	Clínica Ponferrada SDP	3	1	2	245	237	+8	4	
17	Insolac Caja'87	3	1	2	236	229	+7	4	
18	Spanish Basketball Academy	3	1	2	223	225	−2	4	
19	CB Getafe	3	1	2	226	232	−6	4	
20	Maderas Sorlí Benicarló	3	1	2	205	227	−22	4	
21	Ciudad Molina Basket	3	1	2	223	249	−26	4	
22	Sol Gironès Bisbal Bàsquet	3	1	2	224	262	−38	4	
23	CEB Llíria	3	1	2	240	283	−43	4	
24	OCA Global CB Salou	3	0	3	225	261	−36	3	
25	Círculo Gijón	3	0	3	214	257	−43	3	
26	Castillo de Gorraiz Valle de Egüés	3	0	3	206	269	−63	3	
27	Jaén Paraíso Interior CB	3	0	3	215	283	−68	3	
28	Homs UE Mataró	3	0	3	178	249	−71	3	

Source: FEB

=== Matches ===
13 September 2025	Bueno Arenas Albacete Basket	102–85	CEB Llíria	Albacete
19:00	Scoring by quarter: 34–16, 23–24, 18–21, 27–24
		Boxscore		Arena: El Parque; Attendance: 496; Referees: Javier Villanueva, Jesús Ángel Novillo

13 September 2025	Clínica Ponferrada SDP	80–62	Círculo Gijón	Ponferrada
19:30	Scoring by quarter: 16–19, 21–5, 24–12, 19–26
		Boxscore		Arena: Pabellón Lydia Valentín; Attendance: 300; Referees: Jaime Álvarez-Ossorio, Daniel López

13 September 2025	CB Getafe	64–73	CB Toledo Basket	Getafe
19:30	Scoring by quarter: 12–16, 17–16, 20–25, 15–16
		Boxscore		Arena: Juan de la Cierva; Attendance: 350; Referees: Kunal Melwani, Rubén Argüelles

13 September 2025	Castillo de Gorraiz Valle de Egüés	68–89	LogroBasket Logi7	Sarriguren
20:00	Scoring by quarter: 19–26, 12–20, 21–25, 16–18
		Boxscore		Arena: Sarriguren; Attendance: 658; Referees: Aitor Gómez, Unai Sánchez

13 September 2025	Cáceres Patrimonio de la Humanidad	79–74	Spanish Basketball Academy	Cáceres
20:00	Scoring by quarter: 19–23, 20–14, 17–20, 23–17
		Boxscore		Arena: Multiusos Ciudad de Cáceres; Attendance: 401; Referees: Raúl Aguilera, Saúl Pérez

13 September 2025	Lobe Huesca La Magia	80–74	CB Zaragoza	Huesca
20:15	Scoring by quarter: 21–19, 22–29, 14–17, 23–9
		Boxscore		Arena: Municipal; Attendance: 712; Referees: Fernando Martínez, José Manuel Moyano

14 September 2025	Reina Proteínas Clavijo	68–65	Biele ISB	Logroño
12:00	Scoring by quarter: 7–9, 13–18, 26–19, 22–19
		Boxscore		Arena: Palacio de los Deportes; Attendance: 273; Referees: Andrea Alejo, Pablo Mirantes

14 September 2025	Coto Córdoba CB	95–77	Jaén Paraíso Interior CB	Córdoba
12:00	Scoring by quarter: 28–22, 20–19, 24–19, 23–17
		Boxscore		Arena: Vista Alegre; Attendance: 511; Referees: Salvador Patricio, Javier Almansa

14 September 2025	CB Starlabs Morón	78–75	Insolac Caja'87	Morón de la Frontera
12:00	Scoring by quarter: 16–9, 16–22, 23–22, 23–22
		Boxscore		Arena: Alameda; Attendance: 800; Referees: Elías Calvillo, Víctor Vera

14 September 2025	Amics Castelló	89–62	Homs UE Mataró	Castellón de la Plana
12:00	Scoring by quarter: 20–11, 23–17, 26–14, 20–20
		Boxscore		Arena: Ciutat de Castelló; Attendance: 203; Referees: Javier Sáez, Alejandro Climent

14 September 2025	OCA Global CB Salou	76–81	Sol Gironès Bisbal Bàsquet	Salou
17:30	Scoring by quarter: 19–26, 24–14, 15–23, 18–18
		Boxscore		Arena: Centre Salou; Attendance: 300; Referees: Alberto Lázaro, Miguel Ángel Soto

14 September 2025	Maderas Sorlí Benicarló	65–90	Class Bàsquet Sant Antoni	Benicarló
18:00	Scoring by quarter: 13–30, 14–23, 24–14, 14–23
		Boxscore		Arena: Municipal; Attendance: 502; Referees: Cristian García, Gerardo Bernabéu

14 September 2025	Cultural y Deportiva Leonesa	96–87	UEMC CBC Valladolid	León
18:30	Scoring by quarter: 13–29, 21–23, 32–14, 30–21
		Boxscore		Arena: Palacio de los Deportes; Attendance: 1,307; Referees: Alejandro Pellitero, Romina Marchiano

14 September 2025	Proinbeni UPB Gandia	82–69	Ciudad Molina Basket	Gandia
19:00	Scoring by quarter: 26–14, 13–23, 19–24, 24–8
		Boxscore		Arena: Municipal; Attendance: 480; Referees: Francisco Olmos, Joaquín Martínez

20 September 2025	Spanish Basketball Academy	79–84	CB Getafe	Fuenlabrada
17:30	Scoring by quarter: 19–25, 24–22, 19–12, 17–25
		Boxscore		Arena: Fernando Martín; Attendance: 97; Referees: Julio Rijo, Aldo Rodríguez

20 September 2025	UEMC CBC Valladolid	84–82	Clínica Ponferrada SDP	Valladolid
19:00	Scoring by quarter: 19–21, 27–19, 20–23, 18–19
		Boxscore		Arena: Polideportivo Pisuerga; Attendance: 1,170; Referees: Alberto García, Alejandro Gómez

20 September 2025	Proinbeni UPB Gandia	100–60	CEB Llíria	Gandia
19:00	Scoring by quarter: 24–14, 27–25, 28–9, 21–12
		Boxscore		Arena: Municipal; Attendance: 650; Referees: Pol Guadalajara, Roger Mitjana

20 September 2025	Homs UE Mataró	54–62	Maderas Sorlí Benicarló	Mataró
19:00	Scoring by quarter: 8–13, 13–15, 15–16, 18–18
		Boxscore		Arena: Josep Mora; Attendance: 150; Referees: Miguel Hurtado, Javier Cervero

20 September 2025	Ciudad Molina Basket	73–72	Bueno Arenas Albacete Basket	Molina de Segura
19:30	Scoring by quarter: 19–22, 10–18, 27–18, 17–14
		Boxscore		Arena: Serrerías; Attendance: 250; Referees: Asunción Langa, Germán Ortega

20 September 2025	Castillo de Gorraiz Valle de Egüés	58–85	Biele ISB	Sarriguren
20:00	Scoring by quarter: 20–17, 15–19, 13–27, 10–22
		Boxscore		Arena: Sarriguren; Attendance: 589; Referees: Manuel Berbeira, Pablo Mirantes

21 September 2025	Coto Córdoba CB	75–69	Insolac Caja'87	Córdoba
12:00	Scoring by quarter: 13–16, 27–20, 21–20, 14–13
		Boxscore		Arena: Vista Alegre; Attendance: 1,600; Referees: Juan Antonio Expósito, José Manuel Araujo

21 September 2025	Amics Castelló	88–90(OT)	Class Bàsquet Sant Antoni	Castellón de la Plana
12:00	Scoring by quarter: 17–21, 21–18, 22–19, 19–21, Overtime: 9–11
		Boxscore		Arena: Ciutat de Castelló; Attendance: 237; Referees: Eduard Montiel, Eduardo Escartí

21 September 2025	Jaén Paraíso Interior CB	62–96	CB Starlabs Morón	Jaén
12:30	Scoring by quarter: 22–18, 13–26, 13–27, 14–25
		Boxscore		Arena: Olivo Arena; Attendance: 863; Referees: Carlos Betanzos, Ángel Cóndor

21 September 2025	LogroBasket Logi7	57–73	Reina Proteínas Clavijo	Logroño
17:30	Scoring by quarter: 9–21, 13–21, 20–20, 15–11
		Boxscore		Arena: Lobete; Attendance: 1,000; Referees: Imanol Diz, Rodrigo Gallego

21 September 2025	Lobe Huesca La Magia	98–80	Sol Gironès Bisbal Bàsquet	Huesca
18:00	Scoring by quarter: 30–18, 20–23, 28–19, 20–20
		Boxscore		Arena: Municipal; Attendance: 780; Referees: Abraham Hormigo, Lucas Arias

21 September 2025	CB Zaragoza	87–69	OCA Global CB Salou	Zaragoza
18:00	Scoring by quarter: 24–13, 22–13, 22–24, 19–19
		Boxscore		Arena: Siglo XXI; Attendance: 300; Referees: Óscar Navarro, Carlos Aznar

21 September 2025	Cultural y Deportiva Leonesa	79–72	Círculo Gijón	León
18:30	Scoring by quarter: 13–16, 22–19, 18–21, 26–16
		Boxscore		Arena: Palacio de los Deportes; Attendance: 1,633; Referees: Jesús Fernández, Diego Fernández

21 September 2025	Cáceres Patrimonio de la Humanidad	63–70	CB Toledo Basket	Cáceres
20:00	Scoring by quarter: 14–14, 16–18, 14–19, 19–19
		Boxscore		Arena: Multiusos Ciudad de Cáceres; Attendance: 350; Referees: María Muñoz, Ángel González

26 September 2025	Homs UE Mataró	62–98	Class Bàsquet Sant Antoni	Mataró
17:00	Scoring by quarter: 10–29, 21–26, 12–25, 19–18
		Boxscore		Arena: Josep Mora; Attendance: 100; Referees: Josep Lluís Presseguer, Francisco Ndong

27 September 2025	CEB Llíria	95–81	Ciudad Molina Basket	Llíria
18:30	Scoring by quarter: 22–21, 22–25, 29–21, 22–14
		Boxscore		Arena: Pla del Arc; Attendance: 1,001; Referees: Cristian García, Manuel Baselga

27 September 2025	Bueno Arenas Albacete Basket	74–80	Proinbeni UPB Gandia	Albacete
19:00	Scoring by quarter: 19–21, 27–23, 18–18, 10–18
		Boxscore		Arena: El Parque; Attendance: 902; Referees: Encarnación Hernández, Andrés Requena

27 September 2025	Sol Gironès Bisbal Bàsquet	63–88	CB Zaragoza	La Bisbal d'Empordà
19:00	Scoring by quarter: 12–24, 13–20, 23–21, 15–23
		Boxscore		Arena: Municipal; Attendance: 250; Referees: Xavier Girbal, Marc Pinotti

27 September 2025	Clínica Ponferrada SDP	83–91	Cultural y Deportiva Leonesa	Ponferrada
19:30	Scoring by quarter: 20–29, 26–20, 24–29, 13–13
		Boxscore		Arena: Pabellón Lydia Valentín; Attendance: 415; Referees: Manuel Berbeira, Diego Fernández

27 September 2025	CB Getafe	78–80	Cáceres Patrimonio de la Humanidad	Getafe
19:30	Scoring by quarter: 19–15, 17–23, 25–24, 17–18
		Boxscore		Arena: Juan de la Cierva; Attendance: 300; Referees: Kunal Melwani, Jaime Delgado

27 September 2025	Círculo Gijón	80–98	UEMC CBC Valladolid	Gijón
20:00	Scoring by quarter: 10–25, 20–18, 24–29, 26–26
		Boxscore		Arena: Palacio de Deportes; Attendance: 563; Referees: Alejandro Pellitero, Iris Díaz

27 September 2025	CB Toledo Basket	62–70	Spanish Basketball Academy	Toledo
20:00	Scoring by quarter: 26–12, 13–18, 11–20, 12–20
		Boxscore		Arena: Javier Lozano Cid; Attendance: 1,003; Referees: Eduard Montiel, Estíbaliz Rubio

28 September 2025	Reina Proteínas Clavijo	95–80	Castillo de Gorraiz Valle de Egüés	Logroño
12:00	Scoring by quarter: 23–16, 20–24, 29–27, 23–13
		Boxscore		Arena: Palacio de los Deportes; Attendance: 650; Referees: Jesús Marín, Alejandro García

28 September 2025	Biele ISB	64–75	LogroBasket Logi7	Azpeitia
12:00	Scoring by quarter: 13–29, 19–21, 20–15, 12–10
		Boxscore		Arena: Municipal; Attendance: 261; Referees: Daniel Cotta, Álvaro López

28 September 2025	CB Starlabs Morón	78–75	Coto Córdoba CB	Morón de la Frontera
12:00	Scoring by quarter: 21–22, 16–23, 21–20, 20–10
		Boxscore		Arena: Alameda; Attendance: 410; Referees: Alberto García, Rodrigo González

28 September 2025	Insolac Caja'87	92–76	Jaén Paraíso Interior CB	Seville
12:30	Scoring by quarter: 31–28, 20–11, 26–19, 15–18
		Boxscore		Arena: San Pablo; Attendance: 2,218; Referees: Juan Betanzos, Eduardo Prados

28 September 2025	OCA Global CB Salou	80–93	Lobe Huesca La Magia	Salou
17:30	Scoring by quarter: 25–22, 20–26, 19–21, 16–24
		Boxscore		Arena: Centre Salou; Attendance: 300; Referees: Alberto Lázaro, Jorge Ibarra

30 September 2025	Maderas Sorlí Benicarló	78–83	Amics Castelló	Benicarló
20:00	Scoring by quarter: 23–24, 20–20, 13–19, 22–20
		Boxscore		Arena: Municipal; Attendance: 320; Referees: Francisco Olmos, Antonio Ortiz

== Knockout phase ==
In the knockout phase, teams played against each other in single-leg ties. The draw for the knockout phase was held on 2 October 2025. The teams from the lower divisions play the match at home, while in the case of same division, the luck of the draw determined the home court advantage.

=== Round of 32 ===
The round of 32 were played on 21–22 October 2025.

Team 1	Score	Team 2
Fibwi Mallorca Bàsquet Palma	78–79	Súper Agropal Palencia
Biele ISB	89–78	CB Toledo Basket
Lobe Huesca La Magia	95–82	Bueno Arenas Albacete Basket
Alimerka Oviedo Baloncesto	76–82	Monbus Obradoiro
Flexicar Fuenlabrada	92–84	HLA Alicante
Amics Castelló	93–88	Reina Proteínas Clavijo
CB Starlabs Morón	91–82	Coto Córdoba CB
Melilla Ciudad del Deporte	69–63	Caja Rural CB Zamora
LogroBasket Logi7	67–65	Cáceres Patrimonio de la Humanidad
Cultural y Deportiva Leonesa	83–81	Proinbeni UPB Gandia
Class Bàsquet Sant Antoni	94–92	Grupo Alega Cantabria
Cloud.gal Ourense Baloncesto	90–77	Grupo Caesa Seguros FC Cartagena CB
UEMC CBC Valladolid	79–80	Movistar Estudiantes
Inveready Gipuzkoa	76–86	Palmer Basket Mallorca Palma
Hestia Menorca	68–77	Leyma Coruña
CB Zaragoza	78–92	Grupo Ureta Tizona Burgos

Source: FEB

==== Matches ====
21 October 2025	Fibwi Mallorca Bàsquet Palma	78–79	Súper Agropal Palencia	Palma
20:00	Scoring by quarter: 18–20, 22–23, 19–20, 19–16
		Boxscore		Arena: Son Moix; Attendance: 500; Referees: Jorge Baena, Josep Lluís Presseguer, Miguel Hurtado

21 October 2025	UEMC CBC Valladolid	79–80	Movistar Estudiantes	Valladolid
20:00	Scoring by quarter: 20–19, 25–25, 12–19, 22–17
		Boxscore		Arena: Polideportivo Pisuerga; Attendance: 2,500; Referees: Jorge Caamaño, Carlos Gallego, Saúl Pérez

21 October 2025	Inveready Gipuzkoa	76–86	Palmer Basket Mallorca Palma	San Sebastián
20:00	Scoring by quarter: 13–22, 25–17, 16–24, 22–23
		Boxscore		Arena: Amenabar Arena; Attendance: 0 Referees: Cristina Adán, Jaime Gómez, María Muñoz

21 October 2025	Flexicar Fuenlabrada	92–84	HLA Alicante	Fuenlabrada
20:30	Scoring by quarter: 25–24, 21–13, 29–19, 17–28
		Boxscore		Arena: Fernando Martín; Attendance: 1,100; Referees: Ángel de Lucas, Ángel Albacete, Alejandro Benavente

21 October 2025	Class Bàsquet Sant Antoni	94–92	Grupo Alega Cantabria	Ibiza
20:30	Scoring by quarter: 14–24, 27–17, 34–29, 19–22
		Boxscore		Arena: Es Viver; Attendance: 0 Referees: Jordi Domingo, Alejandro López, Alberto Lázaro

21 October 2025	Hestia Menorca	68–77	Leyma Coruña	Mahón
20:30	Scoring by quarter: 19–21, 22–15, 9–17, 18–24
		Boxscore		Arena: Pavelló Menorca; Attendance: 720; Referees: Juan Pedro Morales, Marc García, Miguel Ángel Soto

21 October 2025	Cloud.gal Ourense Baloncesto	90–77	Grupo Caesa Seguros FC Cartagena CB	Ourense
20:45	Scoring by quarter: 17–18, 21–18, 31–17, 21–24
		Boxscore		Arena: Pazo Paco Paz; Attendance: 1,500; Referees: Jacobo Rial, Jaime Álvarez-Ossorio, Daniel López

22 October 2025	Alimerka Oviedo Baloncesto	76–82	Monbus Obradoiro	Oviedo
19:00	Scoring by quarter: 27–32, 15–21, 20–10, 14–19
		Boxscore		Arena: Palacio de los Deportes; Attendance: 1,713; Referees: Jesús Martínez, Francisco González, Unai Sánchez

22 October 2025	Biele ISB	89–78	CB Toledo Basket	Azpeitia
20:00	Scoring by quarter: 22–19, 18–13, 14–24, 35–22
		Boxscore		Arena: Municipal; Attendance: 1,000; Referees: Asier Quintas, Imanol Diz, Andrea Alejo

22 October 2025	CB Starlabs Morón	91–82	Coto Córdoba CB	Morón de la Frontera
20:00	Scoring by quarter: 24–18, 16–31, 25–20, 26–13
		Boxscore		Arena: Alameda; Attendance: 350; Referees: Enrique López, Juan Betanzos, Juan Antonio Expósito

22 October 2025	Cultural y Deportiva Leonesa	83–81	Proinbeni UPB Gandia	León
20:00	Scoring by quarter: 21–22, 22–25, 25–17, 15–17
		Boxscore		Arena: Palacio de los Deportes; Attendance: 1,103; Referees: Juan Carpallo, Cristian Martín, Diego Fernández

22 October 2025	Lobe Huesca La Magia	95–82	Bueno Arenas Albacete Basket	Huesca
20:15	Scoring by quarter: 30–24, 22–26, 19–15, 24–17
		Boxscore		Arena: Palacio Municipal de Huesca; Attendance: 453; Referees: Pablo Rodríguez, Joan Fanés, Jesús Marín

22 October 2025	Amics Castelló	93–88	Reina Proteínas Clavijo	Castellón de la Plana
20:30	Scoring by quarter: 22–19, 28–24, 24–24, 19–21
		Boxscore		Arena: Ciutat de Castelló; Attendance: 245; Referees: Mikel Cañigueral, Cristian García, José Sanchez

22 October 2025	Melilla Ciudad del Deporte	69–63	Caja Rural CB Zamora	Melilla
20:30	Scoring by quarter: 18–25, 22–19, 13–13, 16–6
		Boxscore		Arena: Javier Imbroda Ortiz; Attendance: 300; Referees: Juan Ramón Hurtado, José Sierra, Javier Almansa

22 October 2025	LogroBasket Logi7	67–65	Cáceres Patrimonio de la Humanidad	Logroño
20:30	Scoring by quarter: 14–17, 16–12, 22–21, 15–15
		Boxscore		Arena: Lobete; Attendance: 94; Referees: Daniel Checa, Fernando Martínez, Alexis Fuentes

22 October 2025	CB Zaragoza	78–92	Grupo Ureta Tizona Burgos	Zaragoza
20:30	Scoring by quarter: 10–26, 21–25, 20–20, 27–21
		Boxscore		Arena: Siglo XXI; Attendance: 137; Referees: Pol Franquesa, Eva Aresté, Óscar Navarro

=== Round of 16 ===
The round of 16 were played on 18–19 November 2025.

Team 1	Score	Team 2
Biele ISB	59–92	Súper Agropal Palencia
Lobe Huesca La Magia	66–88	Monbus Obradoiro
Amics Castelló	78–80	Flexicar Fuenlabrada
CB Starlabs Morón	92–85	Melilla Ciudad del Deporte
LogroBasket Logi7	76–74	Cultural y Deportiva Leonesa
Class Bàsquet Sant Antoni	72–83	Cloud.gal Ourense Baloncesto
Movistar Estudiantes	90–77	Palmer Basket Mallorca Palma
Leyma Coruña	83–95	Grupo Ureta Tizona Burgos

Source: FEB

==== Matches ====
18 November 2025	CB Starlabs Morón	92–85	Melilla Ciudad del Deporte	Morón de la Frontera
20:00	Scoring by quarter: 21–22, 25–15, 29–24, 17–24
		Boxscore		Arena: Alameda; Attendance: 400; Referees: Enrique López, Elías Calvillo, Juan Betanzos

18 November 2025	Class Bàsquet Sant Antoni	72–83	Cloud.gal Ourense Baloncesto	Sant Antoni de Portmany
20:00	Scoring by quarter: 24–28, 15–13, 18–26, 15–16
		Boxscore		Arena: Sa Pedrera; Attendance: 1,000; Referees: Josep María Olivares, Alberto Lázaro, Josep Lluís Presseguer

18 November 2025	Movistar Estudiantes	90–77	Palmer Basket Mallorca Palma	Madrid
20:00	Scoring by quarter: 22–32, 22–13, 27–11, 19–21
		Boxscore		Arena: Movistar Academy Magariños; Attendance: 834; Referees: Carlos García, Israel Chacón, Asunción Langa

18 November 2025	Amics Castelló	78–80	Flexicar Fuenlabrada	Castellón de la Plana
20:30	Scoring by quarter: 16–24, 28–15, 14–20, 20–21
		Boxscore		Arena: Ciutat de Castelló; Attendance: 350; Referees: Francisco José Zafra, Juan Pedro Morales, Cristian García

19 November 2025	Biele ISB	59–92	Súper Agropal Palencia	Azpeitia
20:00	Scoring by quarter: 14–18, 23–20, 12–32, 10–22
		Boxscore		Arena: Municipal; Attendance: 522; Referees: Jorge Caamaño, Aitor Gómez, Imanol Diz

19 November 2025	Lobe Huesca La Magia	66–88	Monbus Obradoiro	Huesca
20:15	Scoring by quarter: 17–19, 16–22, 15–29, 18–18
		Boxscore		Arena: Palacio Municipal de Huesca; Attendance: 527; Referees: Antonio Zamora, Fernando Martínez, Jesús Marín

19 November 2025	LogroBasket Logi7	76–74	Cultural y Deportiva Leonesa	Logroño
20:30	Scoring by quarter: 19–18, 20–24, 13–15, 24–17
		Boxscore		Arena: Lobete; Attendance: 150; Referees: Jesús Martínez, Carlos Gallego, Manuel Berbeira

19 November 2025	Leyma Coruña	83–95	Grupo Ureta Tizona Burgos	A Coruña
20:45	Scoring by quarter: 16–6, 24–30, 27–22, 16–37
		Boxscore		Arena: Coliseum da Coruña; Attendance: 2,674; Referees: Jacobo Rial, Paula Lema, Alejandro Pellitero

=== Quarter-finals ===
The quarterfinals were played on 7 January 2025.

Team 1	Score	Team 2
Súper Agropal Palencia	79–73	Monbus Obradoiro
CB Starlabs Morón	78–83	Flexicar Fuenlabrada
LogroBasket Logi7	64–72	Cloud.gal Ourense Baloncesto
Movistar Estudiantes	96–70	Grupo Ureta Tizona Burgos

Source: FEB

==== Matches ====
7 January 2026	CB Starlabs Morón	78–83	Flexicar Fuenlabrada	Morón de la Frontera
20:00	Scoring by quarter: 16–18, 24–19, 22–23, 16–23
		Boxscore		Arena: Alameda; Attendance: 450; Referees: Germán Morales, Enrique López, Juan Betanzos

7 January 2026	Movistar Estudiantes	96–70	Grupo Ureta Tizona Burgos	Madrid
20:00	Scoring by quarter: 28–25, 22–9, 21–16, 25–20
		Boxscore		Arena: Movistar Academy Magariños; Attendance: 632; Referees: Francisco José Zafra, Pablo Rodríguez, Asunción Langa

7 January 2026	Súper Agropal Palencia	79–73	Monbus Obradoiro	Palencia
20:30	Scoring by quarter: 22–14, 22–18, 18–27, 17–14
		Boxscore		Arena: Municipal de Deportes; Attendance: 4,297; Referees: Paula Lema, Juan Carpallo, Alejandro Pellitero

7 January 2026	LogroBasket Logi7	64–72	Cloud.gal Ourense Baloncesto	Logroño
20:30	Scoring by quarter: 20–18, 15–23, 13–17, 16–14
		Boxscore		Arena: Lobete; Attendance: 120; Referees: Ángel de Lucas, Cristian García, Miguel Ángel Soto

== Final Four ==
The Final Four was a single-elimination tournament consisting of two rounds contested by the four series winners of the quarter-finals. It was played on 24–25 January 2026 at the Municipal de Deportes of Palencia.

=== Bracket ===
Semi-finals; 24 January
Súper Agropal Palencia	69
Flexicar Fuenlabrada	57
Cloud.gal Ourense Baloncesto	71
Movistar Estudiantes	90

Final; 25 January
Súper Agropal Palencia	69
Movistar Estudiantes	73

Source: FEB

=== Semi-finals ===
24 January 2026	Súper Agropal Palencia	69–57	Flexicar Fuenlabrada	Palencia
17:00	Scoring by quarter: 6–16, 18–10, 25–21, 20–10
	Pts: Vrankić 17; Rebs: Kamba 5 Asts: Jakovičs 4 Eff: Vrankić 21	Boxscore	Pts: Aurrecoechea 14; Rebs: Aurrecoechea 9 Asts: three players 3 Eff: Aurrecoechea 31	Arena: Municipal de Deportes; Attendance: 3,025; Referees: Leandro Lezcano, Daniel Checa, Alejandro Aranzana

24 January 2026	Cloud.gal Ourense Baloncesto	71–90	Movistar Estudiantes	Palencia
20:00	Scoring by quarter: 16–20, 18–24, 16–25, 21–21
	Pts: Gill 24; Rebs: Vázquez 7 Asts: Lisboa 5 Eff: Gill 29	Boxscore	Pts: Vaulet 15; Rebs: Garino 8 Asts: Granger 6 Eff: Vaulet 22	Arena: Municipal de Deportes; Attendance: 2,457; Referees: Antonio Zamora, Fernando Ibáñez, Israel Chacón

=== Final ===
25 January 2026	Súper Agropal Palencia	69–73	Movistar Estudiantes	Palencia
18:00	Scoring by quarter: 18–24, 19–13, 18–19, 14–17
	Pts: Borg, Vrankić 11; Rebs: Kamba 7 Asts: Jakovičs, Wintering 4 Eff: Vrankić 14	Boxscore	Pts: Nwogbo 16; Rebs: Nwogbo 8 Asts: Granger 5 Eff: Nwogbo 25	Arena: Municipal de Deportes; Attendance: 4,952; Referees: Francisco José Zafra, Leandro Lezcano, Fernando Ibáñez

2025–26 Spain Cup champion
Movistar Estudiantes
1st title
