= 2026–27 in Spanish basketball =

Basketball in Spain
- Season: 2026–27

Men's basketball
- Supercopa: Asisa Joventut

Women's basketball
- Supercopa: Valencia Basket

The 2026–27 season is the 91st season of competitive basketball in Spain.

== Promotion and relegation (pre-season) ==
=== Men's basketball ===
==== Liga ACB ====
▲ Promoted to league	▼ Relegated from league
Monbus Obradoiro; Leyma Coruña	Dreamland Gran Canaria; Coviran Granada

==== Primera FEB ====
▲ Promoted to league	▼ Relegated from league
Cajasol Coto Córdoba; Insolac Caja'87; Bueno Arenas Albacete Basket	Basket Cartagena; Melilla Ciudad del Deporte

== European competitions ==
=== EuroLeague ===
==== Regular season ====
Pos	Team	Pld	W	L	PF	PA	PD	Qualification
1	(Hellenic Basketball Federation) Panathinaikos AKTOR	4	4	0	375	292	+83	Qualification to playoffs
2	(Spanish Basketball Federation) Valencia Basket	4	4	0	405	356	+49	Qualification to playoffs
3	(Hellenic Basketball Federation) Olympiacos	4	3	1	382	342	+40	Qualification to playoffs
4	(Turkish Basketball Federation) Fenerbahçe Tarfin	4	3	1	328	302	+26	Qualification to playoffs
5	(Basketball Federation of Serbia) Partizan Mozzart Bet	4	3	1	346	325	+21	Qualification to playoffs
6	(Basketball Federation of Serbia) Crvena zvezda Meridianbet	4	2	2	311	294	+17	Qualification to playoffs
7	(Turkish Basketball Federation) Beşiktaş	4	2	2	377	368	+9	Qualification to play-in
8	(Lithuanian Basketball Federation) Žalgiris	4	2	2	340	333	+7	Qualification to play-in
9	(Spanish Basketball Federation) Barcelona	4	2	2	352	346	+6	Qualification to play-in
10	(Italian Basketball Federation) Virtus Bologna	4	2	2	343	346	−3	Qualification to play-in
11	(Israeli Basketball Association) Hapoel IBI Tel Aviv	4	2	2	349	357	−8	
12	(United Arab Emirates Basketball Association) Dubai Basketball	4	2	2	296	317	−21	
13	(French Federation of Basketball) LDLC ASVEL	4	2	2	353	377	−24	
14	(Spanish Basketball Federation) Real Madrid	4	1	3	345	350	−5	
15	(Turkish Basketball Federation) Anadolu Efes	4	1	3	314	339	−25	
16	(French Federation of Basketball) Paris Basketball	4	1	3	329	359	−30	
17	(German Basketball Federation) Bayern Munich	4	1	3	333	364	−31	
18	(Israeli Basketball Association) Maccabi Rapyd Tel Aviv	4	1	3	331	362	−31	
19	(Spanish Basketball Federation) Kosner Baskonia	4	1	3	347	385	−38	
20	(Italian Basketball Federation) Armani Olimpia Milan	4	1	3	318	360	−42	

Updated to match(es) played on 9 October 2026. Source: EuroLeague
Rules for classification: Regular season tiebreakers

=== EuroCup ===
==== Regular season ====
===== Group A =====
Pos	Team	Pld	W	L	PF	PA	PD	Qualification
1	(Israeli Basketball Association) Hapoel Midtown Jerusalem	2	2	0	169	137	+32	Advance to eighthfinals
2	(Hellenic Basketball Federation) Aris	2	2	0	180	154	+26	Advance to eighthfinals
3	(Italian Basketball Federation) Baglietto Derthona	2	1	1	173	169	+4	Advance to eighthfinals
4	(Latvian Basketball Association) Rīgas Zeļļi	2	1	1	172	171	+1	Advance to eighthfinals
5	(Spanish Basketball Federation) Recoletas Salud Burgos	2	1	1	165	174	−9	
6	(German Basketball Federation) Rostock Seawolves	2	1	1	160	180	−20	
7	(Basketball Federation of Slovenia) Cedevita Olimpija	2	0	2	145	160	−15	
8	(French Federation of Basketball) Le Mans Sarthe	2	0	2	157	176	−19	

Updated to match(es) played on 7 October 2026. Source: EuroCup
Rules for classification: All points scored in extra period(s) will not be counted in the standings, nor for any tie-break situation.

===== Group B =====
Pos	Team	Pld	W	L	PF	PA	PD	Qualification
1	(Italian Basketball Federation) Umana Reyer Venezia	2	1	1	196	170	+26	Advance to eighthfinals
2	(Italian Basketball Federation) Maxima Roma	2	1	1	166	147	+19	Advance to eighthfinals
3	(British Basketball) London Lions	2	1	1	160	151	+9	Advance to eighthfinals
4	(Turkish Basketball Federation) Türk Telekom	2	1	1	167	159	+8	Advance to eighthfinals
5	(Spanish Basketball Federation) La Laguna Tenerife	2	1	1	159	164	−5	
6	(Lithuanian Basketball Federation) Šiauliai	2	1	1	145	150	−5	
7	(German Basketball Federation) Skyliners Frankfurt	2	1	1	151	175	−24	
8	(Romanian Basketball Federation) U-BT Cluj-Napoca	2	1	1	153	181	−28	

Updated to match(es) played on 7 October 2026. Source: EuroCup
Rules for classification: All points scored in extra period(s) will not be counted in the standings, nor for any tie-break situation.

===== Group D =====
Pos	Team	Pld	W	L	PF	PA	PD	Qualification
1	(Turkish Basketball Federation) Bahçeşehir Koleji	2	2	0	192	138	+54	Advance to eighthfinals
2	(Hellenic Basketball Federation) PAOK	2	2	0	168	150	+18	Advance to eighthfinals
3	(German Basketball Federation) ratiopharm Ulm	2	1	1	187	185	+2	Advance to eighthfinals
4	(Lithuanian Basketball Federation) Lietkabelis	2	1	1	162	164	−2	Advance to eighthfinals
5	(Spanish Basketball Federation) Kids&Us Manresa	2	1	1	179	182	−3	
6	(Italian Basketball Federation) Roma	2	1	1	170	178	−8	
7	(Basketball Federation of Bosnia and Herzegovina) Bosna BH Telecom	2	0	2	144	150	−6	
8	(Bulgarian Basketball Federation) Balkan Botevgrad	2	0	2	144	199	−55	

Updated to match(es) played on 7 October 2026. Source: EuroCup
Rules for classification: All points scored in extra period(s) will not be counted in the standings, nor for any tie-break situation.

=== Champions League ===
==== Qualifying rounds ====
Team 1	Score	Team 2
Round of 16
Río Breogán (Spanish Basketball Federation)	126–80	(Bulgarian Basketball Federation) Rilski Sportist
Quarter-finals
Manchester Basketball (British Basketball)	84–105	(Spanish Basketball Federation) Río Breogán
Semi-finals
Dziki Warsaw (Polish Basketball Federation)	113–110	(Spanish Basketball Federation) Río Breogán

==== Regular season ====
===== Group D =====
Pos	Team	Pld	W	L	PF	PA	PD	Pts	Qualification
1	(Spanish Basketball Federation) UCAM Murcia	1	1	0	85	58	+27	2	Advance to round of 16
2	(Hellenic Basketball Federation) Peristeri Betsson	1	1	0	93	87	+6	2	Advance to play-ins
3	(German Basketball Federation) BMA365 Bamberg Baskets	1	0	1	87	93	−6	1	Advance to play-ins
4	(Italian Basketball Federation) Pallacanestro Varese	1	0	1	58	85	−27	1	

Updated to match(es) played on October 7, 2026. Source: FIBA

===== Group E =====
Pos	Team	Pld	W	L	PF	PA	PD	Pts	Qualification
1	(Spanish Basketball Federation) Unicaja	1	1	0	105	69	+36	2	Advance to round of 16
2	(Italian Basketball Federation) Pallacanestro Reggiana	1	1	0	82	65	+17	2	Advance to play-ins
3	(Czech Basketball Federation) KVIS Pardubice	1	0	1	65	82	−17	1	Advance to play-ins
4	(Lithuanian Basketball Federation) Juventus Utena	1	0	1	69	105	−36	1	

Updated to match(es) played on October 7, 2026. Source: FIBA

===== Group G =====
Pos	Team	Pld	W	L	PF	PA	PD	Pts	Qualification
1	(German Basketball Federation) Alba Berlin	1	1	0	110	86	+24	2	Advance to round of 16
2	(Spanish Basketball Federation) Surne Bilbao	1	1	0	92	79	+13	2	Advance to play-ins
3	(Basketball Federation of Bosnia and Herzegovina) Igokea m:tel	1	0	1	79	92	−13	1	Advance to play-ins
4	(Czech Basketball Federation) Slavia Praha ERA NBK	1	0	1	86	110	−24	1	

Updated to match(es) played on October 7, 2026. Source: FIBA

===== Group H =====
Pos	Team	Pld	W	L	PF	PA	PD	Pts	Qualification
1	(Spanish Basketball Federation) Asisa Joventut	1	1	0	86	75	+11	2	Advance to round of 16
2	(German Basketball Federation) Telekom Baskets Bonn	1	1	0	78	74	+4	2	Advance to play-ins
3	(Portuguese Basketball Federation) FC Porto	1	0	1	74	78	−4	1	Advance to play-ins
4	(Israeli Basketball Association) Bnei Penlink Herzliya	1	0	1	75	86	−11	1	

Updated to match(es) played on October 7, 2026. Source: FIBA

=== FIBA Europe Cup ===
==== Regular season ====
===== Group B =====
Pos	Team	Pld	W	L	PF	PA	PD	Pts	Qualification
1	(Spanish Basketball Federation) FIATC Girona	1	1	0	87	75	+12	2	Advance to second round
2	(Polish Basketball Federation) Zastal Zielona Góra	1	1	0	90	80	+10	2	Advance to second round
3	(Basketball Belgium) Filou Oostende	1	1	0	76	69	+7	2	
4	(Slovak Basketball Association) Patrioti Levice	1	0	1	69	76	−7	1	
5	(Hungarian Basketball Federation) NHSZ-Szolnoki Olajbányász	1	0	1	80	90	−10	1	
6	(Romanian Basketball Federation) Dinamo București	1	0	1	75	87	−12	1	

Updated to match(es) played on 6 October 2026. Source: FIBA

== Men's basketball ==
=== Liga ACB ===
==== Regular season ====
Pos	Team	Pld	W	L	PF	PA	PD	Qualification or relegation
1	Kosner Baskonia	3	3	0	309	248	+61	Qualification to playoffs
2	Real Madrid	3	3	0	323	277	+46	Qualification to playoffs
3	Río Breogán	3	3	0	326	291	+35	Qualification to playoffs
4	Surne Bilbao	3	2	1	304	283	+21	Qualification to playoffs
5	La Laguna Tenerife	3	2	1	250	233	+17	Qualification to playoffs
6	Barça	3	2	1	302	287	+15	Qualification to playoffs
7	Casademont Zaragoza	3	2	1	255	248	+7	Qualification to playoffs
8	Monbus Obradoiro	3	2	1	288	288	0	Qualification to playoffs
9	Valencia Basket	3	1	2	283	276	+7	
10	Recoletas Salud San Pablo Burgos	3	1	2	278	275	+3	
11	Unicaja	3	1	2	254	253	+1	
12	Ilerna Lleida	3	1	2	275	285	−10	
13	UCAM Murcia	3	1	2	254	268	−14	
14	Leyma Coruña	3	1	2	276	312	−36	
15	FIATC Girona	3	1	2	254	310	−56	
16	MoraBanc Andorra	2	0	2	169	182	−13	
17	Asisa Joventut	2	0	2	177	203	−26	Relegation to Primera FEB
18	Kids&Us Manresa	3	0	3	270	328	−58	Relegation to Primera FEB

Updated to match(es) played on 11 October 2026. Source: ACB
Rules for classification: 1) Win–loss record; 2) Head–to–head record; 3) Head–to–head point difference; 4) Point difference; 5) Points scored; 6) Sum of quotients of points scored (Note: Head–to–head record is used only after all the matches between the teams in question have been played)

=== Primera FEB ===
==== Regular season ====
Pos	Team	Pld	W	L	PF	PA	PD	Promotion, qualification or relegation
1	Movistar Estudiantes	3	3	0	264	214	+50	Promotion to Liga ACB
2	Iberolea Palencia	3	3	0	256	212	+44	Qualification to playoffs
3	HLA Alicante	3	3	0	261	220	+41	Qualification to playoffs
4	Grupo Alega Cantabria	3	3	0	258	230	+28	Qualification to playoffs
5	Cajasiete Gran Canaria	3	2	1	261	221	+40	Qualification to playoffs
6	Club Ourense Baloncesto	3	2	1	267	258	+9	Qualification to playoffs
7	Covirán Granada	3	2	1	244	237	+7	Qualification to playoffs
8	Palmer Basket Mallorca Palma	3	2	1	251	244	+7	Qualification to playoffs
9	Insolac Caja'87	3	2	1	223	224	−1	Qualification to playoffs
10	Bueno Arenas Albacete Basket	3	2	1	254	258	−4	
11	Cajasol Coto Córdoba	3	1	2	210	208	+2	
12	Inveready Askatuak Gipuzkoa	3	1	2	244	272	−28	
13	Alimerka Oviedo Baloncesto	3	1	2	235	271	−36	
14	Fibwi Mallorca Bàsquet Palma	3	0	3	256	282	−26	
15	Partizán de Fuenlabrada	3	0	3	224	252	−28	
16	Bàsquet Menorca	3	0	3	208	241	−33	Relegation to Segunda FEB
17	Grupo Ureta Tizona Burgos	3	0	3	251	286	−35	Relegation to Segunda FEB
18	Caja Rural CB Zamora	3	0	3	199	236	−37	Relegation to Segunda FEB

Updated to match(es) played on 11 October 2026. Source: FEB

=== Cup competitions ===
==== Supercopa de España ====
Semifinals
Asisa Joventut	96
Kosner Baskonia	84
Valencia Basket	86
Barça	87

Final
Asisa Joventut	101
Barça	87

== Women's basketball ==
=== Liga Femenina ===
==== Regular season ====
Pos	Team	Pld	W	L	PF	PA	PD	Pts	Qualification or relegation
1	Azulmarino Mallorca Palma	0	0	0	0	0	0	0	Qualification to playoffs
2	Baxi Ferrol	0	0	0	0	0	0	0	Qualification to playoffs
3	Cadí La Seu	0	0	0	0	0	0	0	Qualification to playoffs
4	Casademont Zaragoza	0	0	0	0	0	0	0	Qualification to playoffs
5	Celta Femxa Zorka	0	0	0	0	0	0	0	Qualification to playoffs
6	Durán Maquinaria Ensino	0	0	0	0	0	0	0	Qualification to playoffs
7	Hozono Global Jairis	0	0	0	0	0	0	0	Qualification to playoffs
8	IDK Euskotren	0	0	0	0	0	0	0	Qualification to playoffs
9	Ingeniería Ambiental CAB Estepona	0	0	0	0	0	0	0	
10	Innova-tsn Leganés	0	0	0	0	0	0	0	
11	Kutxabank Araski	0	0	0	0	0	0	0	
12	Lointek Gernika Bizkaia	0	0	0	0	0	0	0	
13	Movistar Estudiantes	0	0	0	0	0	0	0	
14	Perfumerías Avenida	0	0	0	0	0	0	0	
15	Spar Girona	0	0	0	0	0	0	0	Relegation to LF Challenge
16	Valencia Basket	0	0	0	0	0	0	0	Relegation to LF Challenge

First match(es) will be played: 3 October 2026. Source: FEB
