= 2024–25 Segunda FEB =

25th season of the Spanish third basketball league

Segunda FEB
- Season: 2024–25
- Games played: 396
- Teams: 28

Final standings
- Champions: Palmer Basket Mallorca Palma (1st title)
- Promoted: Palmer Basket Mallorca Palma; Melilla Ciudad del Deporte; Fibwi Palma
- Relegated: Ciudad de Huelva Emerita Resources; Sol Gironés Bisbal Básquet; Damex UDEA Algeciras; CB Santfeliuenc; Teknei Bizkaia Zornotza; Ibersol CB Tarragona

The 2024–25 Segunda FEB was the 25th season of the Spanish basketball third league. It started on 5 October 2024 with the first round of the regular season and ended on 31 May 2025 with the promotion playoffs.

== Teams ==
=== Promotion and relegation (pre-season) ===
A total of 28 teams contested the league, including 19 sides from the 2023–24 LEB Plata, three relegated from the 2023–24 LEB Oro and six promoted from the 2023–24 Liga EBA.

▼ Relegated from LEB Oro	▲ Promoted to Primera FEB
Melilla Ciudad del Deporte (Note: It merged in a single team with Melilla Ciudad del Deporte Enrique Soler.); Cáceres Patrimonio de la Humanidad; Rioverde Clavijo	ODILO FC Cartagena CB; Zamora Enamora; CB Starlabs Morón
▲ Promoted from Liga EBA	▼ Relegated to Tercera FEB
Nadunet Refitel Bàsquet Llíria; Coto Córdoba CB; La Salud Archena; PROINBENI UPB Gandia; Cultural y Deportiva Leonesa; Sol Gironés Bisbal Básquet	~~CB Almansa con Afanion~~ (Note: It was dissolved due to economical troubles.); Juventud Alcalá Escribano EME; Fundación Globalcaja La Roda; ~~Ibersol CB Tarragona~~ (Note: It swapped places with Sandá Electroclima CB L'Hospitalet.); Safir Fruits Alginet; Huelva Comercio LRi21 VIRIDIS
▲ Applied to participate	▼ Withdrawn to participate
Insolac Caja'87 (Note: It achieved a vacant berth after the merger of the two teams of the city of Melilla.)	Sandá Electroclima CB L'Hospitalet (Note: It swapped places with Ibersol CB Tarragona.)

=== Venues and locations ===
Location of teams in 2024–25 Segunda FEB
Red: Group East; Green: Group West
Location of teams from the Canary Islands in 2024–25 Segunda FEB

Team	Home city	Arena
Biele ISB	Azpeitia	Municipal
Bueno Arenas Albacete Basket	Albacete	El Parque
Cáceres Patrimonio de la Humanidad	Cáceres	Multiusos Ciudad de Cáceres
CB L'Horta Godella	Godella	Municipal
CB Prat	El Prat de Llobregat	Pavelló Joan Busquets
CB Santfeliuenc	Sant Feliu de Llobregat	Juan Carlos Navarro
Ciudad de Huelva Emerita Resources	Huelva	Carolina Marín
Class Bàsquet Sant Antoni	Sant Antoni de Portmany	Sa Pedrera
Clínica Ponferrada SDP	Ponferrada	Pabellón Lydia Valentín
Coto Córdoba CB	Córdoba	Vista Alegre
Cultural y Deportiva Leonesa	León	Palacio de los Deportes
Damex UDEA Algeciras	Algeciras	Doctor Juan Carlos Mateo
Fibwi Palma	Palma	Son Moix
Gran Canaria B	Las Palmas	Vega de San José
Homs UE Mataró	Mataró	Josep Mora
Ibersol CB Tarragona	Tarragona	El Serrallo
Insolac Caja'87	Seville	San Pablo
La Salud Archena	Archena	Joaquín López Fontes
Lobe Huesca La Magia	Huesca	Palacio Municipal de Huesca
Maderas Sorlí Benicarló	Benicarló	Pavelló Poliesportiu Municipal
Melilla Ciudad del Deporte	Melilla	Javier Imbroda Ortiz
Nadunet Refitel Bàsquet Llíria	Llíria	Pla del Arc
OCA Global CB Salou	Salou	Centre Salou
Palmer Basket Mallorca Palma	Palma	Son Moix
PROINBENI UPB Gandia	Gandia	Municipal
Rioverde Clavijo	Logroño	Palacio de los Deportes
Sol Gironès Bisbal Bàsquet	La Bisbal d'Empordà	Municipal
Teknei Bizkaia Zornotza	Amorebieta-Etxano	Larrea

== Regular season ==
=== Group East ===
Pos	Team	Pld	W	L	PF	PA	PD	Pts	Qualification or relegation
1	Palmer Basket Mallorca Palma	26	23	3	2014	1614	+400	49	Qualification to group champions' playoffs
2	Class Bàsquet Sant Antoni	26	20	6	2114	1917	+197	46	Qualification to promotion playoffs
3	Fibwi Palma	26	17	9	1992	1826	+166	43	Qualification to promotion playoffs
4	CB L'Horta Godella	26	16	10	2033	1937	+96	42	Qualification to promotion playoffs
5	Nadunet Refitel Bàsquet Llíria	26	15	11	1947	1842	+105	41	Qualification to promotion playoffs
6	CB Prat	26	15	11	1976	1922	+54	41	Qualification to promotion playoffs
7	Maderas Sorlí Benicarló	26	12	14	2088	2032	+56	38	Qualification to promotion playoffs
8	OCA Global CB Salou	26	12	14	1933	2090	−157	38	Qualification to promotion playoffs
9	Gran Canaria B	26	11	15	1982	1942	+40	37	
10	PROINBENI UPB Gandia	26	11	15	1969	1996	−27	37	
11	Sol Gironès Bisbal Bàsquet	26	10	16	1893	2024	−131	36	Qualification to relegation playoffs
12	Homs UE Mataró	26	10	16	1932	2119	−187	36	Qualification to relegation playoffs
13	CB Santfeliuenc	26	6	20	1933	2254	−321	32	Relegation to Tercera FEB
14	Ibersol CB Tarragona	26	4	22	1988	2279	−291	30	Relegation to Tercera FEB

Source: FEB

=== Group West ===
Pos	Team	Pld	W	L	PF	PA	PD	Pts	Qualification or relegation
1	Cáceres Patrimonio de la Humanidad	26	16	10	1948	1882	+66	42	Qualification to group champions' playoffs
2	Melilla Ciudad del Deporte	26	15	11	2144	2036	+108	41	Qualification to promotion playoffs
3	Cultural y Deportiva Leonesa	26	15	11	2004	1926	+78	41	Qualification to promotion playoffs
4	Clínica Ponferrada SDP	26	15	11	1996	1923	+73	41	Qualification to promotion playoffs
5	La Salud Archena	26	14	12	1966	2019	−53	40	Qualification to promotion playoffs
6	Lobe Huesca La Magia	26	14	12	2046	1969	+77	40	Qualification to promotion playoffs
7	Insolac Caja'87	26	14	12	1961	1948	+13	40	Qualification to promotion playoffs
8	Biele ISB	26	13	13	1946	1954	−8	39	Qualification to promotion playoffs
9	Bueno Arenas Albacete Basket	26	12	14	1887	1885	+2	38	
10	Coto Córdoba CB	26	12	14	1901	1953	−52	38	
11	Ciudad de Huelva Emerita Resources	26	11	15	2078	2127	−49	37	Qualification to relegation playoffs
12	Rioverde Clavijo	26	11	15	1970	2095	−125	37	Qualification to relegation playoffs
13	Damex UDEA Algeciras	26	10	16	1910	1988	−78	36	Relegation to Tercera FEB
14	Teknei Bizkaia Zornotza	26	10	16	1962	2014	−52	36	Relegation to Tercera FEB

Source: FEB

== Playoffs ==
=== Group champions' playoffs ===
Team 1	Agg.	Team 2	1st leg	2nd leg
Palmer Basket Mallorca Palma	139–130	Cáceres Patrimonio de la Humanidad	63–72	76–58

Source: FEB

=== Promotion playoffs ===
Team 1	Agg.	Team 2	1st leg	2nd leg
Round of 16
Melilla Ciudad del Deporte	201–168	OCA Global CB Salou	88–80	113–88
Cultural y Deportiva Leonesa	196–160	Maderas Sorlí Benicarló	90–70	106–90
Clínica Ponferrada SDP	153–157	CB Prat	73–94	80–63
Nadunet Refitel Bàsquet Llíria	141–146	La Salud Archena	66–78	75–68
CB L'Horta Godella	144–183	Lobe Huesca La Magia	64–95	80–88
Fibwi Palma	148–140	Insolac Caja'87	66–95	82–45
Class Bàsquet Sant Antoni	164–134	Biele ISB	81–60	83–74
Quarter-finals
Cáceres Patrimonio de la Humanidad	153–161	Lobe Huesca La Magia	70–77	83–84
Class Bàsquet Sant Antoni	172–161	CB Prat	87–58	85–103
Melilla Ciudad del Deporte	176–153	La Salud Archena	79–86	97–67
Fibwi Palma	149–143	Cultural y Deportiva Leonesa	70–64	79–79
Semi-finals
Fibwi Palma	145–138	Lobe Huesca La Magia	65–68	80–70
Class Bàsquet Sant Antoni	178–183	Melilla Ciudad del Deporte	85–107	93–76

Source: FEB

=== Relegation playoffs ===
Team 1	Agg.	Team 2	1st leg	2nd leg
Ciudad de Huelva Emerita Resources	156–191	Homs UE Mataró	64–84	92–107
Sol Gironès Bisbal Bàsquet	139–145	Rioverde Clavijo	76–87	63–58

Source: FEB

== Final standings ==
Pos	Team	Pld	W	D	L	Promotion or relegation
1	Palmer Basket Mallorca Palma (C, P)	28	24	0	4	Promotion to Primera FEB
2	Melilla Ciudad del Deporte (P)	32	19	0	13	Promotion to Primera FEB
3	Fibwi Palma (P)	32	20	1	11	Promotion to Primera FEB
4	Class Bàsquet Sant Antoni	32	24	0	8	
5	Lobe Huesca La Magia	32	19	0	13	
6	Cáceres Patrimonio de la Humanidad	30	17	0	13	
7	Cultural y Deportiva Leonesa	30	17	1	12	
8	La Salud Archena	30	16	0	14	
9	CB Prat	30	17	0	13	
10	CB L'Horta Godella	28	16	0	12	
11	Clínica Ponferrada SDP	28	16	0	12	
12	Nadunet Refitel Bàsquet Llíria	28	16	0	12	
13	Insolac Caja'87	28	15	0	13	
14	Maderas Sorlí Benicarló	28	12	0	16	
15	Biele ISB	28	13	0	15	
16	OCA Global CB Salou	28	12	0	16	
17	Bueno Arenas Albacete Basket	26	12	0	14	
18	Gran Canaria B	26	11	0	15	
19	Coto Córdoba CB	26	12	0	14	
20	PROINBENI UPB Gandia	26	11	0	15	
21	Rioverde Clavijo	28	12	0	16	
22	Homs UE Mataró	28	12	0	16	
23	Ciudad de Huelva Emerita Resources (R)	28	11	0	17	Relegation to Tercera FEB
24	Sol Gironès Bisbal Bàsquet (R)	28	11	0	17	Relegation to Tercera FEB
25	Damex UDEA Algeciras (R)	26	10	0	16	Relegation to Tercera FEB
26	CB Santfeliuenc (R)	26	6	0	20	Relegation to Tercera FEB
27	Teknei Bizkaia Zornotza (R)	26	10	0	16	Relegation to Tercera FEB
28	Ibersol CB Tarragona (R)	26	4	0	22	Relegation to Tercera FEB

Source: FEB
(C) Champions; (P) Promoted; (R) Relegated
