= 2026–27 Primera FEB =

31st season of the Spanish second basketball league

Primera FEB
- Season: 2026–27
- Matches played: 72
- Teams: 18

Records
- Biggest home win: Alicante 106–66 Gipuzkoa (25 October 2026)
- Biggest away win: Córdoba 65–99 Gran Canaria (25 October 2026)
- Highest scoring: Tizona 100–101 Oviedo (16 October 2026)
- All statistics correct as of 15 November 2026.

The 2026–27 Primera FEB is the 31st season of the Spanish basketball second league. It started on 25 September 2026 with the first round of the regular season and will end on 6 June 2027 with the Final Four.

== Teams ==
=== Promotion and relegation (pre-season) ===
A total of 18 teams contest the league, including 13 sides from the 2025–26 season, two relegated from the 2025–26 ACB and three promoted from the 2025–26 Segunda FEB.

▼ Relegated from Liga ACB	▲ Promoted to Liga ACB
Cajasiete Gran Canaria; Covirán Granada	Monbus Obradoiro; Leyma Coruña
▲ Promoted from Segunda FEB	▼ Relegated to Segunda FEB
Cajasol Coto Córdoba; Insolac Caja'87; Bueno Arenas Albacete Basket	Basket Cartagena; Melilla Ciudad del Deporte

=== Venues and locations ===
Location of teams in 2026–27 Primera FEB

Team	Home city	Arena	Capacity
Alimerka Oviedo Baloncesto	Oviedo	Palacio de los Deportes	5,340
Bàsquet Menorca	Mahón	Pavelló Menorca	5,115
Bueno Arenas Albacete Basket	Albacete	El Parque	1,000
Caja Rural CB Zamora	Zamora	Ángel Nieto	1,500
Cajasiete Gran Canaria	Las Palmas	Gran Canaria Arena	9,870
Cajasol Coto Córdoba	Córdoba	Vista Alegre	3,500
Club Ourense Baloncesto	Ourense	Pazo Paco Paz	5,500
Covirán Granada	Granada	Palacio de Deportes	8,100
Fibwi Mallorca Bàsquet Palma	Palma	Son Moix	3,800
Grupo Alega Cantabria	Torrelavega	Vicente Trueba	2,688
Grupo Ureta Tizona Burgos	Burgos	Polideportivo El Plantío	2,432
HLA Alicante	Alicante	Pedro Ferrándiz	5,696
Iberolea Palencia	Palencia	Municipal de Deportes	5,012
Insolac Caja'87	Seville	San Pablo	7,242
Inveready Askatuak Gipuzkoa	San Sebastián	Amenabar Arena	11,000
Movistar Estudiantes	Madrid	Movistar Arena	13,109
Movistar Estudiantes	Madrid	Movistar Academy Magariños	600
Palmer Basket Mallorca Palma	Palma	Son Moix	3,800
Partizán de Fuenlabrada	Fuenlabrada	Fernando Martín	5,700

== Regular season ==
=== League table ===
Pos	Team	Pld	W	L	PF	PA	PD	PCT	Promotion, qualification or relegation
1	HLA Alicante	8	8	0	736	603	+133	1.000	Promotion to Liga ACB
2	Movistar Estudiantes	8	7	1	718	619	+99	.875	Qualification to playoffs
3	Iberolea Palencia	8	7	1	660	584	+76	.875	Qualification to playoffs
4	Cajasiete Gran Canaria	8	6	2	728	612	+116	.750	Qualification to playoffs
5	Grupo Alega Cantabria	8	6	2	661	614	+47	.750	Qualification to playoffs
6	Club Ourense Baloncesto	8	5	3	682	656	+26	.625	Qualification to playoffs
7	Palmer Basket Mallorca Palma	8	5	3	692	679	+13	.625	Qualification to playoffs
8	Covirán Granada	8	4	4	633	646	−13	.500	Qualification to playoffs
9	Alimerka Oviedo Baloncesto	8	4	4	631	666	−35	.500	Qualification to playoffs
10	Insolac Caja'87	8	3	5	605	622	−17	.375	
11	Caja Rural CB Zamora	8	3	5	624	652	−28	.375	
12	Bueno Arenas Albacete Basket	8	3	5	630	668	−38	.375	
13	Partizán de Fuenlabrada	8	2	6	623	643	−20	.250	
14	Bàsquet Menorca	8	2	6	557	597	−40	.250	
15	Cajasol Coto Córdoba	8	2	6	568	613	−45	.250	
16	Grupo Ureta Tizona Burgos	8	2	6	683	747	−64	.250	Relegation to Segunda FEB
17	Inveready Askatuak Gipuzkoa	8	2	6	608	724	−116	.250	Relegation to Segunda FEB
18	Fibwi Mallorca Bàsquet Palma	8	1	7	624	718	−94	.125	Relegation to Segunda FEB

Updated to match(es) played on 15 November 2026. Source: FEB

=== Results ===
Home \ Away	OCB	MEN	ABK	CRZ	GCA	CCB	COB	GRA	FMP	GAC	TZN	LUC	PAL	C87	AGB	MOV	PMP	FUE
Alimerka Oviedo	—			81–77		70–63		67–77	99–86									
Bàsquet Menorca	75–65	—							67–72			64–81		69–73				
Bueno Arenas Albacete		56–62	—			81–71				82–81			69–95					
Caja Rural Zamora			90–89	—				89–81					77–86			73–80		
Cajasiete Gran Canaria	108–69		97–75		—										87–66			
Cajasol Coto Córdoba				72–57	65–99	—								83–81				74–80
Ourense Baloncesto							—		83–73	86–101	91–71	79–83		87–74				
Covirán Granada								—			91–88				76–82	97–101		71–66
Fibwi Mallorca Palma				79–92					—	76–88						78–94		
Grupo Alega Cantabria		69–68								—			73–85			73–71		84–79
Grupo Ureta Tizona	100–101		92–104		83–104						—	79–89						
HLA Alicante					84–74				100–66			—			106–66		97–93	96–82
Iberolea Palencia		91–76				70–67	84–80	72–56					—					
Insolac Caja'87								81–84			73–75			—			81–72	77–74
Inveready Gipuzkoa						75–73	86–90			67–92					—		90–94	
Movistar Estudiantes					102–80								86–77	78–65	106–76	—		
Palmer Mallorca Palma	80–79		80–74	84–69					95–94		94–95						—	
Partizán Fuenlabrada		90–76			68–79		84–86											—

Updated to match(es) played on 15 November 2026. Source: FEB
Legend: Blue = home team win; Red = away team win.
