= 2025–26 Segunda FEB =

26th season of the Spanish third basketball league

Segunda FEB
- Season: 2025–26
- Games played: 394
- Teams: 28

Final standings
- Champions: Coto Córdoba CB (1st title)
- Promoted: Coto Córdoba CB; Insolac Caja'87; Bueno Arenas Albacete Basket
- Relegated: Jaén Paraíso Interior CB; Homs UE Mataró; OCA Global CB Salou; Castillo de Gorraiz Valle de Egüés; Círculo Gijón

The 2025–26 Segunda FEB was the 26th season of the Spanish basketball third league. It started on 4 October 2025 with the first round of the regular season and ended on 31 May 2026 with the promotion playoffs.

== Teams ==
=== Promotion and relegation (pre-season) ===
A total of 28 teams contested the league, including 16 sides from the 2024–25 season, three relegated from the 2024–25 Primera FEB, six promoted from the 2024–25 Tercera FEB and three guest teams according to the FEB criteria. On 4 July 2025, 25 teams were registered in the league leaving three vacant berths after the withdrawals of CB Prat, CB L'Horta Godella and Gran Canaria B from the league due to the newly created Liga U. On 18 July 2025, CB Salou, Spanish Basketball Academy and Jaén Paraíso Interior CB completed the 28 teams registered to play in the league.

| ▼ Relegated from Primera FEB | ▲ Promoted to Primera FEB |
|---|---|
| UEMC CBC Valladolid; Amics Castelló; CB Starlabs Morón | Palmer Basket Mallorca Palma; Melilla Ciudad del Deporte; Fibwi Mallorca Bàsquet Palma |
| ▲ Promoted from Tercera FEB | ▼ Relegated to Tercera FEB |
| Ciudad Molina Basket; CB Getafe; CB Zaragoza; LogroBasket Logi7; Círculo Gijón; Castillo de Gorraiz Valle de Egües | Ciudad de Huelva Emerita Resources; ~~Sol Gironés Bisbal Básquet~~ (Note: It swapped places with CB Prat.); Damex UDEA Algeciras; CB Santfeliuenc; Teknei Bizkaia Zornotza; Ibersol CB Tarragona |
| ▲ Applied to participate | ▼ Withdrawn from participation |
| CB Toledo Basket (Note: It bought the place to CB L'Horta Godella.); Spanish Basketball Academy; Jaén Paraíso Interior CB | La Salud Archena (Note: It withdrawn from the league due to lack of funds.); CB Prat (Note: It swapped places with Sol Gironés Bisbal Básquet due to the end of collaboration with Joventut Badalona that joined to the Liga U.); CB L'Horta Godella (Note: It sold its place to CB Toledo Basket due to the end of collaboration with Valencia Basket that joined to the Liga U.); Gran Canaria B (Note: It withdrawn from the league to participate in the Liga U.) |

=== Venues and locations ===
Location of teams in 2025–26 Segunda FEB
Red: Group East; Green: Group West

| Team | Home city | Arena |
|---|---|---|
| Amics Castelló | Castellón de la Plana | Ciutat de Castelló |
| Biele ISB | Azpeitia | Municipal |
| Bueno Arenas Albacete Basket | Albacete | El Parque |
| Cáceres Patrimonio de la Humanidad | Cáceres | Multiusos Ciudad de Cáceres |
| Castillo de Gorraiz Valle de Egüés | Valle de Egüés | Maristas |
| Reina Proteínas Clavijo | Logroño | Palacio de los Deportes |
| CB Getafe | Getafe | Juan de la Cierva |
| CB Starlabs Morón | Morón de la Frontera | Alameda |
| CB Toledo Basket | Toledo | Javier Lozano Cid |
| CB Zaragoza | Zaragoza | Siglo XXI |
| Círculo Gijón | Gijón | Palacio de Deportes |
| Ciudad Molina Basket | Molina de Segura | Serrerías |
| Class Bàsquet Sant Antoni | Sant Antoni de Portmany | Sa Pedrera |
| Clínica Ponferrada SDP | Ponferrada | Pabellón Lydia Valentín |
| Club Esportiu Bàsquet Llíria | Llíria | Pla del Arc |
| Coto Córdoba CB | Córdoba | Vista Alegre |
| Cultural y Deportiva Leonesa | León | Palacio de los Deportes |
| Homs UE Mataró | Mataró | Josep Mora |
| Insolac Caja'87 | Seville | San Pablo |
| Jaén Paraíso Interior CB | Jaén | La Salobreja |
| LogroBasket Logi7 | Logroño | Lobete |
| Lobe Huesca La Magia | Huesca | Palacio Municipal de Huesca |
| Maderas Sorlí Benicarló | Benicarló | Pavelló Poliesportiu Municipal |
| OCA Global CB Salou | Salou | Centre Salou |
| Proinbeni UPB Gandia | Gandia | Municipal |
| Sol Gironès Bisbal Bàsquet | La Bisbal d'Empordà | Municipal |
| Spanish Basketball Academy | Alcorcón | SBA Arena |
| UEMC CBC Valladolid | Valladolid | Polideportivo Pisuerga |

== Regular season ==
=== Group East ===
| Pos | Team | Pld | W | L | PF | PA | PD | Pts | Qualification or relegation |
|---|---|---|---|---|---|---|---|---|---|
| 1 | Amics Castelló | 26 | 21 | 5 | 2211 | 1951 | +260 | 47 | Qualification to group champions' playoffs |
| 2 | Class Bàsquet Sant Antoni | 26 | 20 | 6 | 2165 | 1910 | +255 | 46 | Qualification to promotion playoffs |
| 3 | Bueno Arenas Albacete Basket | 26 | 18 | 8 | 2123 | 2034 | +89 | 44 | Qualification to promotion playoffs |
| 4 | Spanish Basketball Academy | 26 | 18 | 8 | 2109 | 1965 | +144 | 44 | Qualification to promotion playoffs |
| 5 | Proinbeni UPB Gandia | 26 | 16 | 10 | 2170 | 2019 | +151 | 42 | Qualification to promotion playoffs |
| 6 | Club Esportiu Bàsquet Llíria | 26 | 14 | 12 | 2032 | 1997 | +35 | 40 | Qualification to promotion playoffs |
| 7 | Lobe Huesca La Magia | 26 | 13 | 13 | 2158 | 2155 | +3 | 39 | Qualification to promotion playoffs |
| 8 | CB Zaragoza | 26 | 12 | 14 | 2151 | 2104 | +47 | 38 | Qualification to promotion playoffs |
| 9 | CB Getafe | 26 | 11 | 15 | 2096 | 2112 | −16 | 37 | |
| 10 | Sol Gironès Bisbal Bàsquet | 26 | 10 | 16 | 1902 | 2027 | −125 | 36 | |
| 11 | Maderas Sorlí Benicarló | 26 | 9 | 17 | 1935 | 2096 | −161 | 35 | |
| 12 | Ciudad Molina Basket | 26 | 8 | 18 | 1917 | 2148 | −231 | 34 | Qualification to relegation playoffs |
| 13 | Homs UE Mataró | 26 | 7 | 19 | 1944 | 2162 | −218 | 33 | Relegation to Tercera FEB |
| 14 | OCA Global CB Salou | 26 | 5 | 21 | 1937 | 2170 | −233 | 31 | Relegation to Tercera FEB |

Source: FEB

=== Group West ===
| Pos | Team | Pld | W | L | PF | PA | PD | Pts | Qualification or relegation |
|---|---|---|---|---|---|---|---|---|---|
| 1 | Coto Córdoba CB | 26 | 18 | 8 | 1953 | 1857 | +96 | 44 | Qualification to group champions' playoffs |
| 2 | Insolac Caja'87 | 26 | 18 | 8 | 2096 | 1896 | +200 | 44 | Qualification to promotion playoffs |
| 3 | Biele ISB | 26 | 17 | 9 | 2099 | 1968 | +131 | 43 | Qualification to promotion playoffs |
| 4 | UEMC CBC Valladolid | 26 | 17 | 9 | 2221 | 2070 | +151 | 43 | Qualification to promotion playoffs |
| 5 | CB Starlabs Morón | 26 | 16 | 10 | 2064 | 1997 | +67 | 42 | Qualification to promotion playoffs |
| 6 | Reina Proteínas Clavijo | 26 | 15 | 11 | 2008 | 1918 | +90 | 41 | Qualification to promotion playoffs |
| 7 | Clínica Ponferrada SDP | 26 | 15 | 11 | 2030 | 2012 | +18 | 41 | Qualification to promotion playoffs |
| 8 | Cáceres Patrimonio de la Humanidad | 26 | 15 | 11 | 2135 | 2012 | +123 | 41 | Qualification to promotion playoffs |
| 9 | CB Toledo Basket | 26 | 14 | 12 | 2055 | 1961 | +94 | 40 | |
| 10 | Cultural y Deportiva Leonesa | 26 | 11 | 15 | 2143 | 2208 | −65 | 37 | |
| 11 | LogroBasket Logi7 | 26 | 8 | 18 | 1897 | 1997 | −100 | 34 | |
| 12 | Jaén Paraíso Interior CB | 26 | 8 | 18 | 1927 | 2163 | −236 | 34 | Qualification to relegation playoffs |
| 13 | Castillo de Gorraiz Valle de Egüés | 26 | 5 | 21 | 1938 | 2260 | −322 | 31 | Relegation to Tercera FEB |
| 14 | Círculo Gijón | 26 | 5 | 21 | 1984 | 2231 | −247 | 31 | Relegation to Tercera FEB |

Source: FEB

== Playoffs ==
=== Group champions' playoffs ===
| Team 1 | Agg. | Team 2 | 1st leg | 2nd leg |
|---|---|---|---|---|
| Amics Castelló | 158–164 | Coto Córdoba CB | 75–105 | 83–59 |

Source: FEB

=== Promotion playoffs ===
| Team 1 | Agg. | Team 2 | 1st leg | 2nd leg |
|---|---|---|---|---|
Round of 16
| Insolac Caja'87 | 163–134 | CB Zaragoza | 82–59 | 81–75 |
| Biele ISB | 176–156 | Lobe Huesca La Magia | 73–81 | 103–75 |
| UEMC CBC Valladolid | 162–178 | Club Esportiu Bàsquet Llíria | 75–102 | 87–76 |
| Proinbeni UPB Gandia | 135–143 | CB Starlabs Morón | 72–87 | 63–56 |
| Spanish Basketball Academy | 145–127 | Reina Proteínas Clavijo | 63–74 | 82–53 |
| Bueno Arenas Albacete Basket | 154–148 | Clínica Ponferrada SDP | 74–73 | 80–75 |
| Class Bàsquet Sant Antoni | 177–133 | Cáceres Patrimonio de la Humanidad | 84–72 | 93–61 |
Quarter-finals
| Amics Castelló | 157–146 | Club Esportiu Bàsquet Llíria | 82–72 | 75–74 |
| Class Bàsquet Sant Antoni | 173–135 | CB Starlabs Morón | 98–67 | 75–68 |
| Insolac Caja'87 | 161–157 | Spanish Basketball Academy | 80–89 | 81–68 |
| Bueno Arenas Albacete Basket | 167–136 | Biele ISB | 80–60 | 87–76 |
Semi-finals
| Amics Castelló | 130–138 | Bueno Arenas Albacete Basket | 64–70 | 66–68 |
| Class Bàsquet Sant Antoni | 143–147 | Insolac Caja'87 | 72–91 | 71–56 |

Source: FEB

=== Relegation playoffs ===
| Team 1 | Agg. | Team 2 | 1st leg | 2nd leg |
|---|---|---|---|---|
| Ciudad Molina Basket | 154–151 | Jaén Paraíso Interior CB | 61–69 | 93–82 |

Source: FEB

== Final standings ==
| Pos | Team | Pld | W | L | Promotion or relegation |
|---|---|---|---|---|---|
| 1 | Coto Córdoba CB (C, P) | 28 | 19 | 9 | Promotion to Primera FEB |
| 2 | Insolac Caja'87 (P) | 32 | 22 | 10 | Promotion to Primera FEB |
| 3 | Bueno Arenas Albacete Basket (P) | 32 | 24 | 8 | Promotion to Primera FEB |
| 4 | Amics Castelló | 32 | 24 | 8 | |
| 5 | Class Bàsquet Sant Antoni | 32 | 25 | 7 | |
| 6 | Biele ISB | 30 | 18 | 12 | |
| 7 | Spanish Basketball Academy | 30 | 20 | 10 | |
| 8 | CB Starlabs Morón | 30 | 17 | 13 | |
| 9 | Club Esportiu Bàsquet Llíria | 30 | 15 | 15 | |
| 10 | UEMC CBC Valladolid | 28 | 18 | 10 | |
| 11 | Proinbeni UPB Gandia | 28 | 17 | 11 | |
| 12 | Reina Proteínas Clavijo | 28 | 16 | 12 | |
| 13 | Clínica Ponferrada SDP | 28 | 15 | 13 | |
| 14 | Lobe Huesca La Magia | 28 | 14 | 14 | |
| 15 | Cáceres Patrimonio de la Humanidad | 28 | 15 | 13 | |
| 16 | CB Zaragoza | 28 | 12 | 16 | |
| 17 | CB Toledo Basket | 26 | 14 | 12 | |
| 18 | CB Getafe | 26 | 11 | 15 | |
| 19 | Cultural y Deportiva Leonesa | 26 | 11 | 15 | |
| 20 | Sol Gironès Bisbal Bàsquet | 26 | 10 | 16 | |
| 21 | Maderas Sorlí Benicarló | 26 | 9 | 17 | |
| 22 | LogroBasket Logi7 | 26 | 8 | 18 | |
| 23 | Ciudad Molina Basket | 26 | 8 | 18 | |
| 24 | Jaén Paraíso Interior CB (R) | 26 | 8 | 18 | Relegation to Tercera FEB |
| 25 | Homs UE Mataró (R) | 26 | 7 | 19 | Relegation to Tercera FEB |
| 26 | Castillo de Gorraiz Valle de Egüés (R) | 26 | 5 | 21 | Relegation to Tercera FEB |
| 27 | OCA Global CB Salou (R) | 26 | 5 | 21 | Relegation to Tercera FEB |
| 28 | Círculo Gijón (R) | 26 | 5 | 21 | Relegation to Tercera FEB |

Source: FEB
(C) Champions; (P) Promoted; (R) Relegated
