= Andalusia autonomous basketball team =

Asturias
- National federation: Andalusian Basketball Federation
Home	Away

The Andalusia autonomous basketball team is the basketball team of Andalusia, Spain. The team is not affiliated to FIBA, so it only plays friendly games.

== History ==
The Andalusian team has only played two friendly games: one against a USA All-Star team in 1985 and a second game against Croatia in 1993. For this second game, due to the lack of professional players in the region, the two coaches Mario Pesquera and Javier Imbroda had called up three foreign players.

== Games played ==
24 May 1993	Andalusia	82–105	Croatia	Seville
	Scoring by half: 38–44, 53–52
	Pts: Doblado 14		Pts: Petrović 24	Arena: San Pablo; Attendance: 1,800; Referees: Radić, Nieto
