= Marc Martí (basketball) =

Spanish basketball player

No. 17 – Basket Cartagena
- Position: Power forward
- League: Primera FEB

Personal information
- Born: 19 June 1997 (age 29) Lleida, Spain
- Listed height: 2.03 m (6 ft 8 in)
- Listed weight: 203 lb (92 kg)

Career information
- NBA draft: 2019: undrafted
- Playing career: 2015–present

Career history
- 2015–2019: Zaragoza
- 2015–2016: →El Olivar
- 2016–2018: →Força Lleida
- 2019–2020: Força Lleida
- 2020–2025: Oviedo
- 2025–present: Cartagena
Medals
Men's basketball
Representing Spain
U20 European Championship
Gold medal – first place	2016 Finland	Team

Marc Martí Roig (born 19 June 1997) is a Spanish professional basketball player for ODILO FC Cartagena CB of the Primera FEB.

== Career ==
=== Zaragoza ===
Martí played for CE Lleida Bàsquet youth system before moving Basket Zaragoza at the age of 16. Still a junior, on 1 March 2015, he made his professional debut playing 1 minute on a Liga ACB game against Baloncesto Fuenlabrada. He spent next season playing for farm team El Olivar in LEB Plata. On 16 December 2015, played 8 minutes of 2015–16 Eurocup game against Reyer Venezia.

On 29 July 2016, was loaned to Força Lleida in LEB Oro after a 3 years contract extension. On 21 June 2017, was loaned again to his hometown team. Played 2018–19 ACB season with Zaragoza before his contract ending.

On 30 July 2019, he joins Força Lleida on a one-year contract.

On July 31, 2025, he signed forODILO FC Cartagena CB of the Primera FEB.

== National team ==
Martí played for the Spanish men's national team on the 2016 FIBA Europe Under-20 Championship, winning gold medal. Also a member of the team on the 2017 FIBA Europe Under-20 Championship.
