= Nacho Varela =

Chilean basketball player

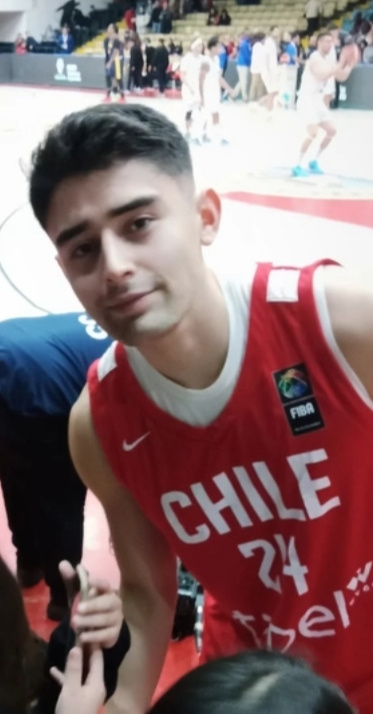
- Varela in 2025

No. 24 – Caja 87
- Position: Point guard
- League: Primera FEB

Personal information
- Born: 24 January 2000 (age 26) Osorno, Chile
- Listed height: 1.87 m (6 ft 2 in)

Career information
- High school: Juan Diego Catholic High School (Draper, Utah) (2017–2018)
- Playing career: 2016–present

Career history
- 2016: Deportes Castro
- 2018–2023: Estudiantes
- 2022–2023: →Menorca
- 2023–2024: Força Lleida
- 2024–2025: Obradoiro
- 2025–2026: Gipuzkoa Basket
- 2026–present: Caja 87
Medals
Men's basketball
Representing Chile
Bronze medal – third place	2012 Maldonado
Bronze medal – third place	2015 Chaco
Gold medal – first place	2017 Lima

Ignacio Andrés Arroyo Varela (born 24 January 2000) is a Chilean professional basketball player.

== Club career ==
Ever since Varela joined Movistar Estudiantes in 2017, he has been coached by Javier Zamora. In July 2020, Arroyo extended the contract with his team until 2023.

In July 2025, he signed for Gipuzkoa Basket of the Primera FEB. On July 11, 2026, he signed with Caja 87 Baloncesto of the Primera FEB.

== National team ==
Varela has represented Chile at both senior and junior level.

For both his country's U-15 team and U-17 team he won bronze at the South American Championship. At the 2017 FIBA South America Under-17 Championship he topped his previous performances by winning the gold medal.
