= Caja 87 Baloncesto =

- Leagues: Primera FEB
- Founded: 2024
- Arena: Deportes San Pablo
- Capacity: 7,626
- Location: Seville, Spain
- Team colors: Green, red and white
- President: Gonzalo Crespo Gil
- Head coach: Juani Díez
- Website: caja87baloncesto.es
Home	Away

Caja 87 Baloncesto, known as Insolac Caja 87 Baloncesto for sponsorship reasons, is a basketball team based in Seville, Spain. The team currently plays in Primera FEB, the second tier of Spanish basketball.

== History ==
Caja 87 Baloncesto was established in 2024 by brothers Sergio and Gonzalo Crespo, businessmen based in Seville. The club was created with the aim to become Seville's main basketball club after the dissolution of the former Baloncesto Sevilla, known as Real Betis Baloncesto in its last iteration. The club's name and colors were inherited from the original Baloncesto Sevilla, known by its sponsored name, Caja San Fernando, between 1987 and 2004.

In July 2024, Caja 87 earned a berth in Segunda FEB, securing its participation in the 2024–25 Segunda FEB season. In May 2026, Caja 87 won the 2025–26 Segunda FEB promotion playoffs, securing a spot in the 2026–27 Primera FEB.

== Players ==
=== Current roster ===
Note: Flags indicate national team eligibility at FIBA-sanctioned events. Players may hold other non-FIBA nationalities not displayed.

Caja 87 Baloncesto roster
Players
Coaches

Pos.	No.	Nat.	Name	Ht.	Age
SF	0	(Spain)	Cecilia, Sergio	1.98 m (6 ft 6 in)	26 – 12 April 2000
SG	2	(United States)	Moody, Aanen	1.91 m (6 ft 3 in)	28 – 15 January 1998
SG	3	(United States) (Togo)	Alley, Ezekiel	1.85 m (6 ft 1 in)	27 – 14 February 1999
SG	10	(United States)	Webster, Kobe	1.93 m (6 ft 4 in)	27 – 31 July 1999
SF	11	(Spain)	Mendikote, Unai	1.98 m (6 ft 6 in)	27 – 30 March 1999
C	13	(Spain)	Vilà, Ramón	2.03 m (6 ft 8 in)	29 – 11 September 1997
F	16	(Bosnia and Herzegovina)	Đedović, Nedim	2.05 m (6 ft 9 in)	29 – 16 February 1997
C	18	(Spain)	Latorre, Adrián	2.09 m (6 ft 10 in)	25 – 20 August 2001
PF	21	(Spain)	Valero, Javier	2.02 m (6 ft 8 in)	26 – 1 May 2000
PG	24	(Chile)	Varela, Nacho	1.87 m (6 ft 2 in)	26 – 24 January 2000
PG	30	(Spain)	Franch, Josep	1.91 m (6 ft 3 in)	35 – 28 January 1991
C	47	(Belgium)	Izaw-Bolavie, Archange	2.10 m (6 ft 11 in)	19 – 27 June 2007
PG	99	(Spain)	García, Rafa	1.87 m (6 ft 2 in)	26 – 27 June 2000

Head coach

- (Argentina) Juan Ignacio Díez

Legend

- (C) Team captain
- Injured

- Roster

=== Depth chart ===
Pos.	Starting 5	Bench 1	Bench 2
C	Archange Izaw-Bolavie	Ramón Vilà	Adrián Latorre
PF	Nedim Đedović	Javier Valero
SF	Kobe Webster	Unai Mendikote	Sergio Cecilia
SG	Aanen Moody	Ezekiel Alley
PG	Nacho Varela	Josep Franch	Rafa García

Colours: Blue = homegrown player; Red = non-FIBA Europe player

== Season by season ==
Season	Tier	Division	Pos.	W–L	Cup competitions	
2024–25	3	Segunda FEB	7th	14–12		
2025–26	3	Segunda FEB	2nd (Note: Achieved promotion to Primera FEB.)	18–8	Spain Cup	GS
2026–27	2	Primera FEB			Spain Cup	R16
