= CB Getafe =

Basketball team in Community of Madrid, Spain

- Leagues: Primera División
- Founded: 2014
- Arena: Pabellón Juan de la Cierva
- Location: Getafe, Community of Madrid
- Team colors: Blue and yellow
- Website: cbgetafe.es
Home	Away

Club Baloncesto Getafe, also known as Viten Getafe by sponsorship reasons, are a Spanish professional basketball team based in Getafe, Community of Madrid. The team was founded in 2014, and competes in the Segunda FEB, the third division of Spain's basketball pyramid.

== History ==
Founded in 2014 as a merge of the main basketball clubs in the city, it played in LEB Plata as the reserve team of Baloncesto Fuenlabrada.

In 2016, both clubs ended their relationship and CB Getafe registered at Primera División.

== Season by season ==
Season	Tier	Division	Pos.	W–L	Cup competitions	
2014–15	3	LEB Plata	8th	15–15		
2015–16	3	LEB Plata	16th (Note: After ending the agreement with Baloncesto Fuenlabrada resigned to its berth in Liga EBA.)	4–22		
2016–17	5	1ª División	15th	9–15		
2017–18	5	1ª División	19th	13–15		
2018–19	5	1ª División	20th	12–16		
2019–20	5	1ª División	5th (Note: Season curtailed due to the COVID-19 pandemic.)	11–8		
2020–21	5	1ª División	5th	13–3		
2021–22	5	1ª División	1st	22–8		
2022–23	4	Liga EBA	9th	11–15		
2023–24	5	1ª División	10th	13–15		
2024–25	4	Tercera FEB	2nd	21–8		
2025–26	3	Segunda FEB	18th	11–15	Spain Cup	GS
2026–27	3	Segunda FEB			Spain Cup	GS
