= Córdoba CB =

Cajasol Coto Córdoba CB
- League: Primera FEB
- Founded: 14 June 2022; 4 years ago
- History: Córdoba CB (2022–present)
- Arena: Vista Alegre
- Capacity: 3,500
- Location: Córdoba, Spain
- Team colors: Green and white
- President: Rafael Blanco
- Head coach: Gonzalo Rodríguez Palmeiro
- Website: cordobacb.es
Home	Away

Córdoba CB, also known as Cajasol Coto Córdoba CB for sponsorship reasons, is a basketball club based in Córdoba, Spain. The team plays in the Primera FEB. It home arena is the Palacio Municipal de Deportes de Vista Alegre.

== History ==
It was founded on 14 June 2022 as the result of the merger of the local teams Virgen del Carmen and Ciudad de Córdoba with the aim to play in the Liga EBA or take the leap to compete directly in the LEB Plata Finally, it was registered in the Primera Nacional.

=== Liga EBA (2023-24) ===
In 2023, it accepted one of the vacant berths to play in the Liga EBA. On May 10, 2024, it achieved the promotion to the Segunda FEB, after finishing first in its group of the promotion playoffs, after beating Movistar Estudiantes B and Fundación Bilbao Basket.

=== Segunda FEB ===
After the much-missed 1990s, when Cajasur Córdoba fought to be promoted to the ACB league, and the last time a Córdoba club participated in the professional basketball league in 2010, the season 2024/2025 begins in LEB Plata with a clear objective: to remain in the same category next year.

=== The team secured their place in the category (2024-25) ===
The club secured its mathematical survival by winning away at Teknei Bizkaia Zornotza, a direct rival in the battle to avoid relegation. The team enjoyed its best moments in the first two months of the competition. The squad, then coached by Alfredo Gálvez, was in peak physical condition. As it also had a long rotation, it ended up exhausting many of its rivals in the last quarter. The team was in second place on the eighth day. With a record of six wins and two losses, it had the same number of wins as the leader, Cáceres Patrimonio de la Humanidad. Staying up seemed to be on track.

Everything changed in December. The team hit a slump that led them to lose seven of the eight games they played in December and January. The defeat against Clínica Ponferrada SDP led to the dismissal of coach Alfredo Gálvez and the promotion of Nacho Pastor from assistant coach to head coach. A 5–5 record since the arrival of the coach trained at El Carmen meant that the objective was achieved with one game to spare.

It was a season of ups and downs and learning for a club making its debut in the category, which ended with the achievement of staying up, the initial objective with which it had started the competition.

=== League Title Triumph and Córdoba's Long-Awaited Return to Primera FEB After 24 Years ===
Córdoba CB completed a remarkable achievement by securing promotion to the Primera FEB after successfully defending the 30-point advantage they had built against Amics del Bàsquet Castelló. Having won the first leg 105–75, the Córdoba side suffered a 24-point defeat (83–59) in the return match, but it was enough to be crowned league champions and seal promotion through the champions' play-off.

Head coach Gonzalo Rodríguez Palmeiro, from Santiago de Compostela, took charge of a squad.

Córdoba CB displayed consistency throughout the season and eventually won the Western Group title after a battle with Insolac Caja 87 and UEMC Baloncesto Valladolid. The decisive play-off series is iconic in Córdoba's sporting history.

== Sponsorship naming ==
Córdoba CB has had several denominations through the years due to its sponsorship:

- Coto Córdoba CB: 2022–2026
- Cajasol Coto Córdoba CB: 2026-

== Home arenas ==
- Palacio Municipal de Deportes de Vista Alegre: (2022–present)

== Head coaches ==
- Miguel Ángel Luque - Ignacio Pastor: 2022–2023
- Alfredo Gálvez: 2023–2025
- Ignacio Pastor: 2025
- Gonzalo Rodríguez: 2025-

== Season by season ==
Season	Tier	Division	Pos.	W–L	Spain Cup
2022–23	5	1ª Nacional	9th	9–15	
2023–24	4	Liga EBA	2nd	26–5	
2024–25	3	Segunda FEB	10th	12–14	
2025–26	3	Segunda FEB	1st	18-8	Round of 32
2026–27	2	Primera FEB			

== Current roster ==
Note: Flags indicate national team eligibility at FIBA-sanctioned events. Players may hold other non-FIBA nationalities not displayed.

Córdoba CB roster
Players
Coaches

Pos.	No.	Nat.	Name	Ht.	Age
PF	0	(Nigeria)	Nkereuwem, Leslie	2.03 m (6 ft 8 in)	25 – 8 December 2000
PG	1	(United States)	Cone, Jalen	1.80 m (5 ft 11 in)	25 – 14 December 2000
SG	4	(United States)	Stephenson-Moore, Tyler	1.91 m (6 ft 3 in)	25 – 19 August 2001
SF	5	(Spain)	Treviño, Pau	2.01 m (6 ft 7 in)	24 – 27 March 2002
PF	7	(Spain)	Rodríguez, Alejandro	2.03 m (6 ft 8 in)	28 – 19 January 1998
PG	10	(Spain)	Orozco, Gonzalo	1.96 m (6 ft 5 in)	24 – 5 July 2002
SG	11	(Nigeria)	Nuga, Mike	1.88 m (6 ft 2 in)	28 – 27 December 1997
PF	15	(Spain)	Rosa, Ignacio	2.06 m (6 ft 9 in)	27 – 1 July 1999
C	17	(The Gambia)	Sagnia, Nuha	2.08 m (6 ft 10 in)	26 – 1 August 2000
C	18	(Serbia)	Armus, Mladen	2.08 m (6 ft 10 in)	29 – 26 March 1997
PG	22	(Spain)	Trujillo, Manu	1.93 m (6 ft 4 in)	19 – 20 March 2007
SF	27	(Spain)	Bello, Fernando	1.98 m (6 ft 6 in)	23 – 25 June 2003

Head coach

- (Spain) Gonzalo Rodríguez Palmeiro

Legend

- (C) Team captain
- Injured

=== Transfers ===
Transfers for the 2026–27 season

Joining

- (Spain) Pau Treviño (SF)
- (United States) Jalen Cone (PG)
- (Spain) Ignacio Rosa (PF)
- (Serbia) Mladen Armus (C)
- (Spain) Manu Trujillo (PG)
- (United States) Tyler Stephenson-Moore (SG)
- (Nigeria) Leslie Nkereuwem (PF)
- (Nigeria) Mike Nuga (SG)

Leaving

- (Spain) Alejandro Orozco (PG)
- (Spain) Pablo Sánchez (PG)
- (Senegal) Serigne Lamine Ndiaye (PF)
- (Netherlands) Kevin Schutte (C)
- (Cameroon) Jacques-Melaine Guemeta (SG)
- (United States) Ja'Monta Black (SG)
- (Haiti) Zachary Rollins (SF)
