= Albacete Basket =

- Leagues: Primera FEB
- Founded: 3 September 2012; 14 years ago
- Arena: Pabellón del Parque
- Capacity: 2,500
- Location: Albacete, Castilla–La Mancha, Spain
- Team colors: Green and white
- President: Miguel Ventayol
- Head coach: David Varela
- Championships: 1 Segunda FEB (2025–26)
- Website: albacetebasket.com
Home	Away	Third

Albacete Basket, also known as Bueno Arenas Albacete Basket for sponsorship reasons, is a Spanish professional basketball club based in Albacete, Castilla–La Mancha. The team currently plays in the Primera FEB, the second tier of Spanish basketball, following their promotion from Segunda FEB in the 2025–26 season.

== History ==
Albacete Basket was founded in 2012 as a merger of the senior teams of the city's two clubs (CABA and EBA) with the aim to be the main basketball reference in Albacete.

After playing four seasons in Liga EBA, it was promoted to LEB Plata in the 2015–16 season, in its third consecutive appearance in the promotion play-offs and just after resigning to an invitation of the Spanish Basketball Federation in the previous season.

In their debut season in LEB Plata, the club was relegated after losing on the last matchday against Zamora, but was able to remain in the league by achieving one of the vacant berths.

== Sponsorship naming ==
- Arcos Albacete Basket 2015–present

== Current roster ==
Note: Flags indicate national team eligibility at FIBA-sanctioned events. Players may hold other non-FIBA nationalities not displayed.

Albacete Basket roster
Players
Coaches

Pos.	No.	Nat.	Name	Ht.	Age
G	2	(Portugal)	Amiel, Francisco	1.86 m (6 ft 1 in)	30 – 20 January 1996
G	3	(Spain)	Aguilar, Victor	1.85 m (6 ft 1 in)	28 – 9 June 1998
F	5	(United States)	Reid, Nick	2.01 m (6 ft 7 in)	24 – 20 March 2002
SG	6	(Slovenia)	Zemljič, Jan	1.92 m (6 ft 4 in)	22 – 14 October 2004
G	7	(Spain)	Córdoba, Pablo	1.88 m (6 ft 2 in)	29 – 24 October 1997
G	10	(Argentina) (Italy)	Merlo, Silvano	1.93 m (6 ft 4 in)	24 – 19 August 2002
G	11	(Spain)	González, Chuso	1.92 m (6 ft 4 in)	32 – 20 August 1994
PF	16	(Slovenia)	Malovčić, Alen	2.02 m (6 ft 8 in)	24 – 16 August 2002
G/F	22	(Russia) (Spain)	Voronin, Makar	1.98 m (6 ft 6 in)	21 – 16 April 2005
C	44	(Spain)	Vanaclocha, Bernat	2.10 m (6 ft 11 in)	28 – 16 April 1998
PF	66	(Angola)	Macachi, Braz	2.03 m (6 ft 8 in)	25 – 5 September 2001
C	77	(Spain)	Hierrezuelo, Juan	2.08 m (6 ft 10 in)	25 – 7 November 2000

Head coach

- (Spain) David Varela

Legend

- (C) Team captain
- Injured

- Roster
Updated: 6 November 2026

== Season by season ==
Season	Tier	Division	Pos.	W–L	Cup competitions	
2012–13	4	Liga EBA	9th	13–15		
2013–14	4	Liga EBA	2nd	24–9		
2014–15	4	Liga EBA	2nd	21–8		
2015–16	4	Liga EBA	1st	24–5		
2016–17	3	LEB Plata	15th (Note: Remained in the league after achieving a vacant berth.)	9–21		
2017–18	3	LEB Plata	5th	23–16		
2018–19	3	LEB Plata	17th	17–17		
2019–20	3	LEB Plata	15th (Note: Season curtailed due to the COVID-19 pandemic.)	12–13		
2020–21	3	LEB Plata	11th	16–12		
2021–22	3	LEB Plata	2nd	21–1–10		
2022–23	2	LEB Oro	18th	7–27		
2023–24	3	LEB Plata	5th	21–11		
2024–25	3	Segunda FEB	17th	12–14	Spain Cup	GS
2025–26	3	Segunda FEB	3rd	24–8	Spain Cup	R32
2026–27	2	Primera FEB			Spain Cup	R32

=== Notable players ===
Note: Flags indicate national team eligibility at FIBA-sanctioned events. Players may hold other non-FIBA nationalities not displayed.

Criteria

To appear in this section a player must have either:

- Set a club record or won an individual award while at the club
- Played at least one official international match for their national team at any time
- Played at least one official NBA match at any time.

- (Denmark) Zarko Jukic
- (Finland) Remu Raitanen
