= Cáceres Ciudad del Baloncesto =

Cáceres Patrimonio de la Humanidad
- Leagues: LEB Oro
- Founded: 2007; 19 years ago
- Arena: Ciudad de Cáceres
- Capacity: 6,550
- Location: Cáceres, Extremadura
- Team colors: Black and Green
- President: José Manuel Sánchez
- Head coach: Roberto Blanco
- Championships: 1 LEB Plata
- Website: www.caceresbasket.com
Home	Away

Cáceres Ciudad del Baloncesto, also named as Cáceres Patrimonio de la Humanidad for sponsorship reasons, is a professional basketball team based in Cáceres, Extremadura, Spain. It plays in the LEB Oro, the second in importance in Spain after ACB League.

The club is distinct from Cáceres Club Baloncesto, the former elite team in the city, which was dissolved in 2005.

== History ==
Cáceres Ciudad del Baloncesto was founded in 2007 as a merger of two teams from Cáceres city:

- San Antonio
- Ciudad de Cáceres

Cáceres played the first season in its history (2007–08) in LEB Plata after buying the berth to CEB Llíria. In this first year, playing as Cáceres 2016, the team achieved the promotion semifinals but, after beating CajaRioja in the quarterfinalist series, lost against CB Illescas in the semifinal played at Cáceres.

After this season, the team joined the second tier, the LEB Oro, after achieving the vacant of Palma Aqua Màgica. Cáceres continues playing in LEB Oro until nowadays, where reached two times in a row the promotion playoffs but failed in the quarterfinals: in 2010 versus Ford Burgos and in 2011 versus Blu:sens Monbús, both times by 3–1.

In 2012 the club won for the first time a LEB Oro quarterfinal serie, 3–2 to Ford Burgos, but failed in the semifinal against Club Melilla Baloncesto after five games. Same happened in 2013, when the club advanced to semifinals after defeating CB Breogán by 2–3 in the quarterfinals and failing 3–1 against River Andorra.

In 2013 the club opted by joining the LEB Plata again due to economic issues. On April 25, 2015, two years after its resign to play in LEB Oro, Cáceres came back to the league after winning the 2014–15 LEB Plata, by defeating CEBA Guadalajara 67–63 in the last game of the regular season.

The 2019–20 season is its fifth straight season in LEB Oro and tenth overall.

== Sponsorship naming ==
- Cáceres 2016: 2007–11
- Cáceres Creativa: 2011
- Cáceres Patrimonio de la Humanidad: 2011–

== Head coaches ==
- Fede Pozuelo: 2007
- Piti Hurtado: 2007–2009
- Gustavo Aranzana: 2009–2012
- Carlos Frade: 2012–2013
- Ñete Bohígas: 2013–2019
- Roberto Blanco: 2019–present

== Players ==
=== Current roster ===
Note: Flags indicate national team eligibility at FIBA-sanctioned events. Players may hold other non-FIBA nationalities not displayed.

Cáceres Patrimonio de la Humanidad roster
Players
Coaches

Pos.	No.	Nat.	Name	Ht.	Age
G	11	(Spain)	Rodriguez, Manu	1.92 m (6 ft 4 in)	35 – 17 August 1991
F	0	(Cameroon)	Mbala, Ben	2.00 m (6 ft 7 in)	31 – 13 July 1995
F	35	(Republic of the Congo)	Belemene, Romaric	2.05 m (6 ft 9 in)	29 – 19 February 1997
G	13	(Spain)	Lobo, Jaume	1.80 m (5 ft 11 in)	29 – 31 July 1997
G	6	(Spain)	Sanz, Jorge	1.88 m (6 ft 2 in)	33 – 24 January 1993
C	14	(Spain)	Olaizola, Julen	2.02 m (6 ft 8 in)	33 – 4 March 1993
F	37	(Spain)	Toledo, Carlos	2.00 m (6 ft 7 in)	31 – 11 December 1994
G	0	(United States)	Schmidt, Devin	1.93 m (6 ft 4 in)	31 – 24 November 1994
G	7	(Argentina)	Diaz, Mateo	1.86 m (6 ft 1 in)	24 – 6 March 2002
F	26	(Croatia)	Dukan, Duje	2.08 m (6 ft 10 in)	34 – 4 December 1991
F	4	(Spain)	Trapote, Alex	1.98 m (6 ft 6 in)	23 – 3 August 2003
G		(Spain)	Vasallo, Javier	1.87 m (6 ft 2 in)	25 – 21 April 2001
F		(Finland)	Raitanen, Remu	2.06 m (6 ft 9 in)	29 – 21 August 1997

Head coach

- (Spain) Roberto Blanco

Legend

- (C) Team captain
- Injured

=== Depth chart ===
Pos.	Starting 5	Bench
C	Romaric Belemene	Julen Olaizola
PF	Carlos Toledo
SF	Devin Schmidt
SG	Jorge Sanz
PG	Jaume Lobo	Manu Rodriguez

Colours: Blue = homegrown player; Black = FIBA Europe or Cotonou player; Red = Foreign player.

== Season by season ==
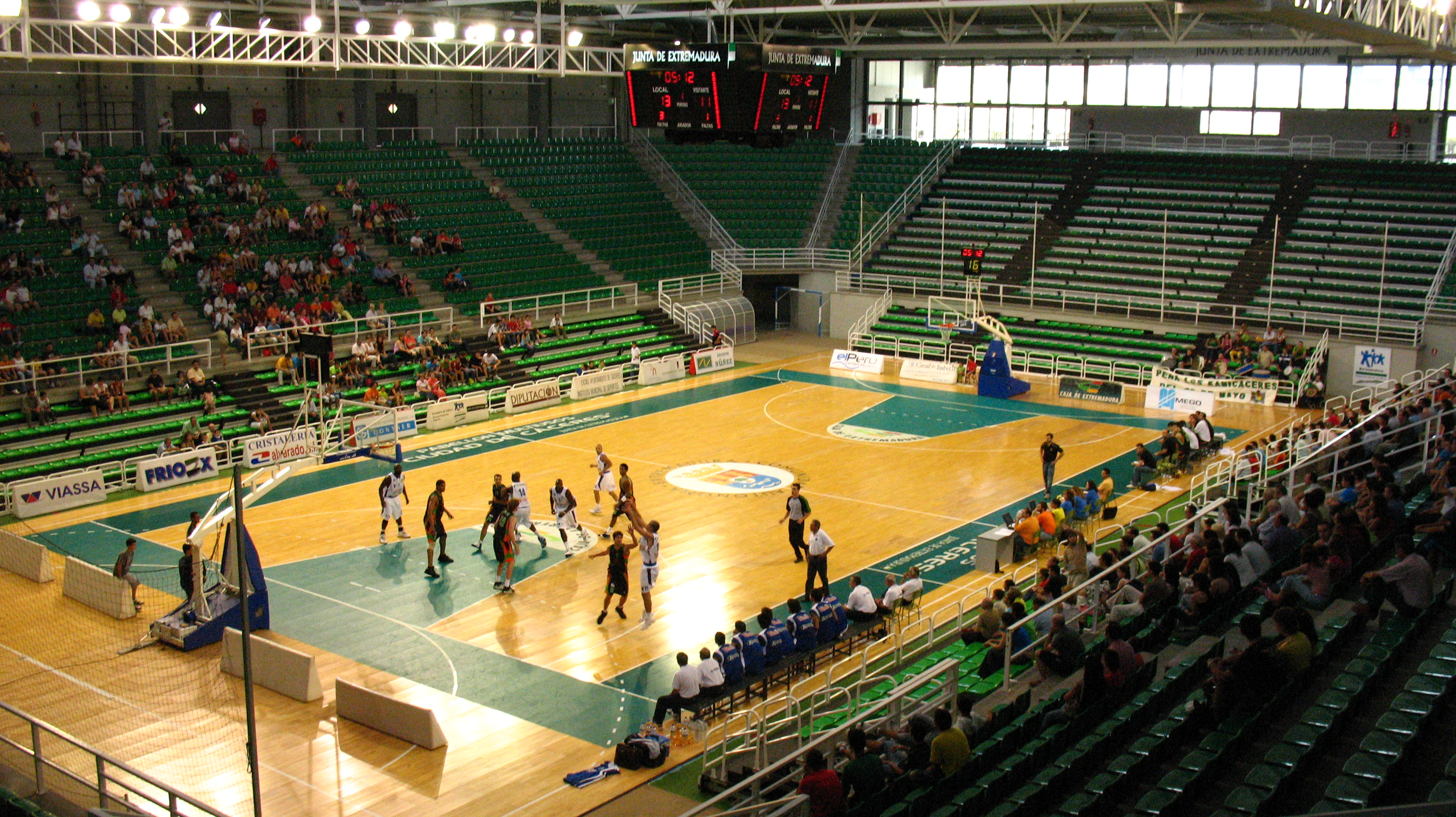
Multiusos Ciudad de Cáceres, home court of the team

Season	Tier	Division	Pos.	W–L	Cup competitions	
2007–08	3	LEB Plata	5th (Note: Achieved the vacant berth at LEB Oro of Palma Aqua Màgica.)	22–15		
2008–09	2	LEB Oro	11th	15–19		
2009–10	2	LEB Oro	6th	21–17		
2010–11	2	LEB Oro	9th	19–19		
2011–12	2	LEB Oro	5th	23–21		
2012–13	2	LEB Oro	5th (Note: Resigned to its berth at LEB Oro.)	16–19		
2013–14	3	LEB Plata	4th	18–14		
2014–15	3	LEB Plata	1st	23–5		
2015–16	2	LEB Oro	9th	14–17		
2016–17	2	LEB Oro	11th	14–20		
2017–18	2	LEB Oro	10th	15–19		
2018–19	2	LEB Oro	14th	11–23		
2019–20	2	LEB Oro	9th (Note: Season curtailed due to the COVID-19 pandemic.)	14–10		
2020–21	2	LEB Oro	12th	11–15		
2021–22	2	LEB Oro	8th	21–18		
2022–23	2	LEB Oro	15th	10–24		
2023–24	2	LEB Oro	17th	6–28		
2024–25	3	Segunda FEB	6th	17–13	Spain Cup	GS
2025–26	3	Segunda FEB	15th	15–13	Spain Cup	R32
2026–27	3	Segunda FEB			Spain Cup	R16

== Notable players ==
- (Kosovo) Dardan Berisha
- (United States) Devin Schmidt
- (Spain) Lucio Angulo
- (Spain) José Ángel Antelo
- (Spain) José María Panadero
- (Spain) Carlos Cherry
- (Spain) Juan Sanguino
- (Finland) Remu Raitanen
- (Cape Verde) Jeff Xavier
- (United States) Randy Holcomb
- (United States) Jelani McCoy
- (United States) Drew Naymick
- (United States) Wayne Simien
- (United States) Harper Williams
- (Spain) Luis Parejo
- (Senegal) Mansour Kasse
- (Spain) Sergio Pérez
- (Greece) Georgios Dedas
- (Iceland) Ragnar Nathanaelsson
- (United States) Warren Ward
- (South Sudan) Angelo Chol
- (Panama) Javier Carter
- (Spain) Ricardo Úriz

== Trophies and awards ==
=== Trophies ===
- LEB Plata: (1)
  - 2015
- Copa Extremadura: (2)
  - 2008, 2011

== See also ==
- Cáceres Club Baloncesto
