= Pabellón Polideportivo Pisuerga =

Arena in Valladolid, Spain

Coordinates: 41°37′53″N 4°44′41″W

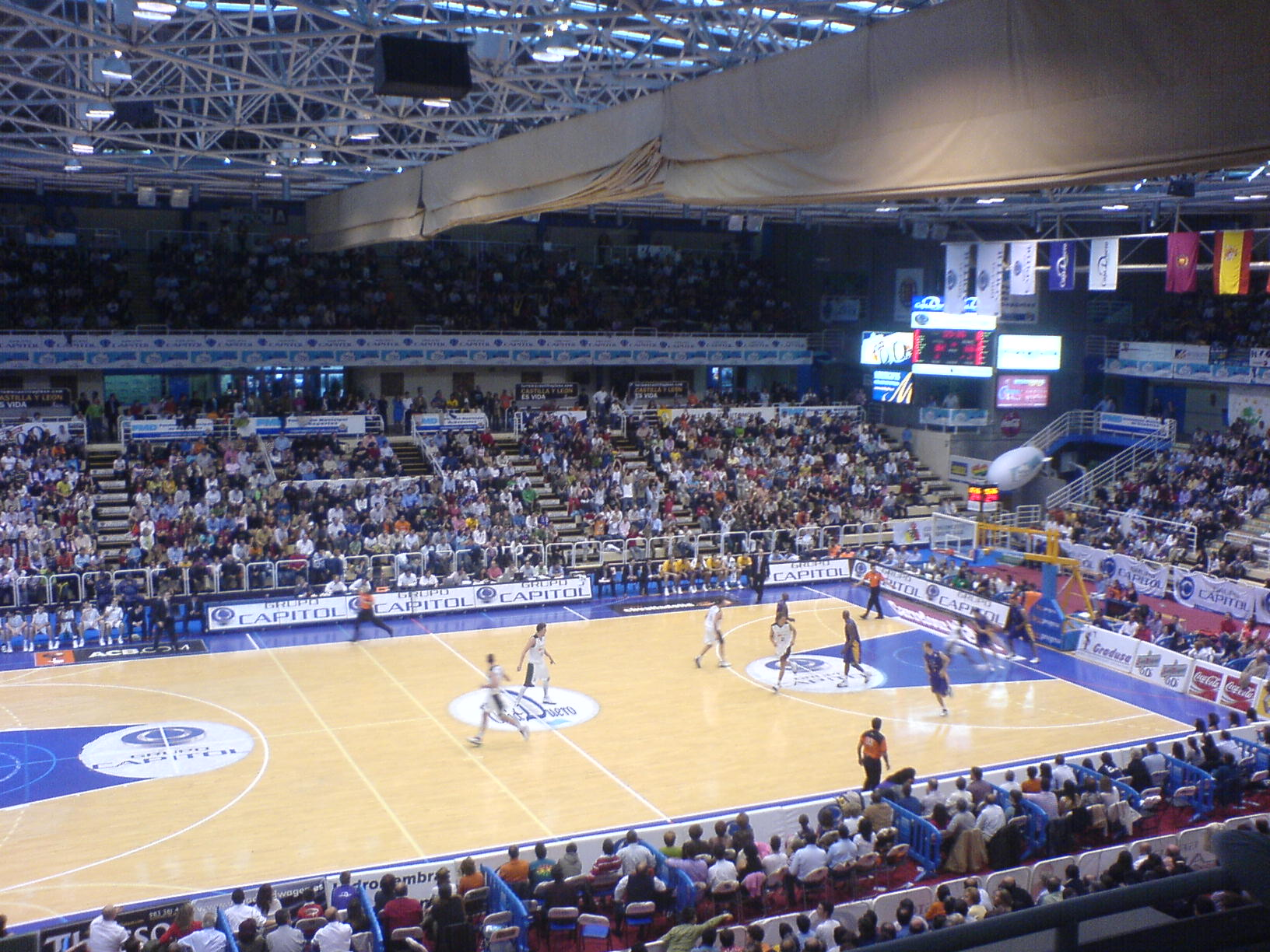
- Interactive map of Pabellón Polideportivo Pisuerga
- Owner: Valladolid City Hall
- Capacity: 6,800
- Surface: Parquet Floor
- Record attendance: 8,000 (Fórum Valladolid vs Il Messaggero Roma, 26 February 1992)

Construction
- Opened: 1985
- Renovated: 2010

Tenant
- CB Ciudad de Valladolid

Pabellón Polideportivo Pisuerga is an arena in Valladolid, Spain. It can hold 6,800 people.

It is primarily used for basketball and the home arena of CB Valladolid, who moved into it from the Polideportivo Huerta del Rey in 1985. BM Valladolid, a handball team who play at the aforementioned venue, use Pisuerga for European games due to its larger capacity.

Bob Dylan performed at the arena during his Never Ending Tour on July 9, 2006.

In 2010, the arena was renovated by adding seats in all the stands.
