= Palau Municipal d'Esports Son Moix =

Sports venue in Palma, Spain

- Son Moix
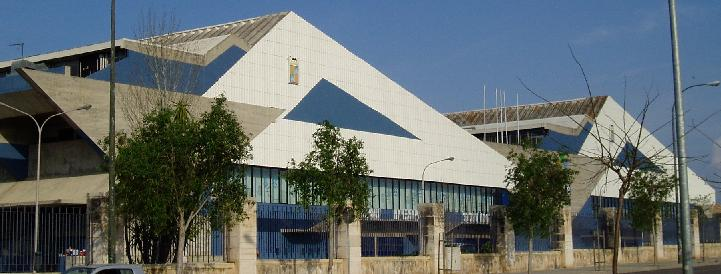
- Interactive map of Palau Municipal d'Esports Son Moix
- Location: Camí de la Vileta, 40, Palma, Spain
- Coordinates: 39.587337°N 2.627821°E
- Owner: Town Hall of Palma
- Capacity: 3.920

Construction
- Renovated: 2007–2014

Tenants
- Palma Futsal; Palma Air Europa

The Palau Municipal d'Esports Son Moix is a futsal arena in Palma, Spain. It is currently used for the basketball matches of Palma Air Europa and the futsal matches of Palma Futsal. The arena holds 3.920 spectators.

== History ==
In October 2007, a heavy storm partially destroyed the arena. The renovation works lasted seven years and the Son Moix was re-opened on 18 January 2014.
