= Palacio de los Deportes de León =

Indoor arena in Spain

Coordinates: 42°35′21.04″N 5°34′38.24″W

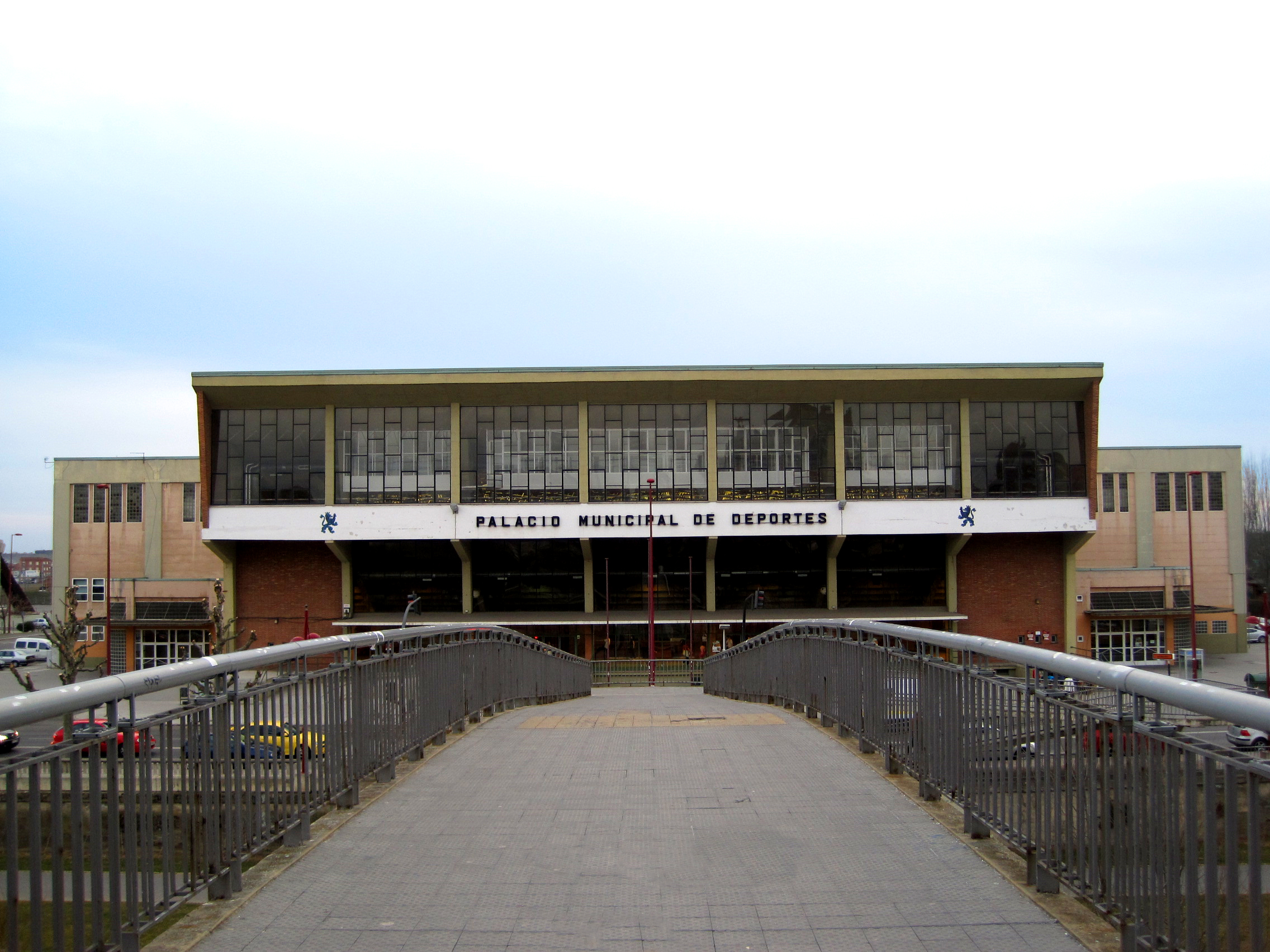
- Interactive map of Palacio de los Deportes de León
- Location: León, Spain
- Owner: Ayuntamiento de León
- Capacity: 5,188

Construction
- Built: 1970

Tenants
- CB Ademar León; Baloncesto León (until 2012); Cultural Leonesa (basketball) (2022–present)

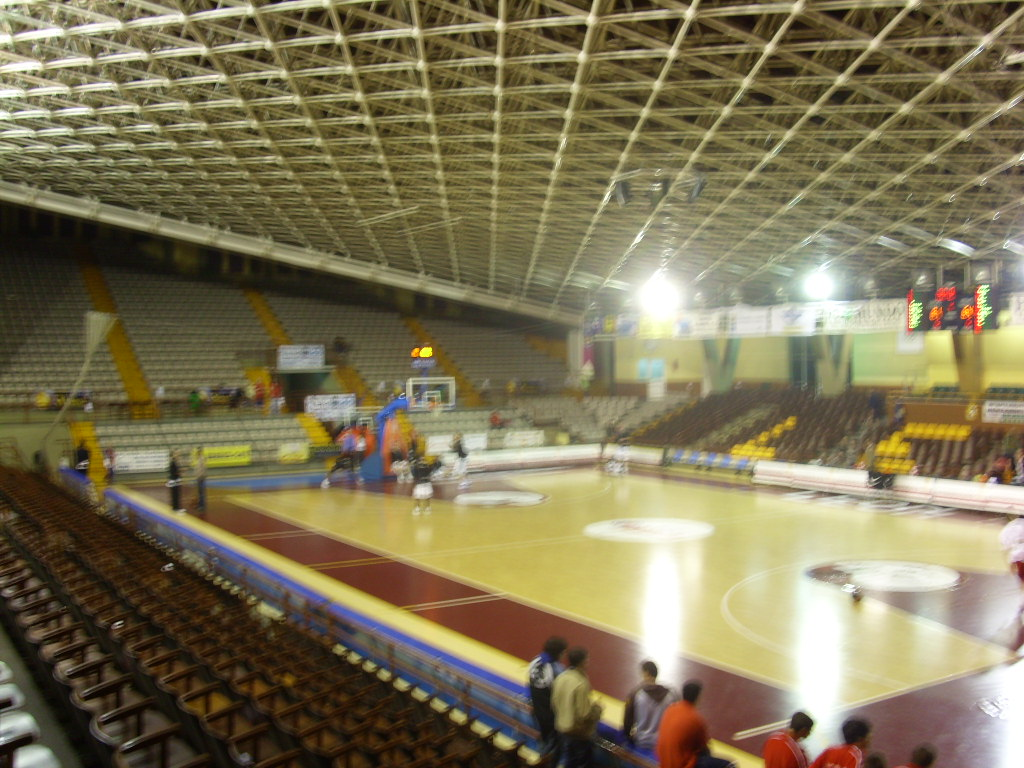
Interior view.

Palacio de los Deportes de León, also known as Palacio Municipal de los Deportes de León, is a multi-use indoor arena in León, Spain. Built in 1970, it has a seating capacity of 5,188 seats, and is currently the home venue for Baloncesto León basketball team and CB Ademar León handball team.

== History ==
The sports center was designed by architect Efrén García Fernández in 1966. In 2023, the 2,8-million-euro project to renovate the building's design and infrastructures, dubbed Palacio Deportes León Next Generation, was initiated. It was completed in May 2024, in time for the annual San Juan y San Pedro feast. Only the club CB Ademar León received a financial compensation for the disturbance caused by the construction.
