= Basket Cartagena =

ODILO FC Cartagena CB
- Nickname: Cebé
- League: Primera FEB
- Founded: 2007; 19 years ago
- History: Basket Cartagena (2007–2020); FC Cartagena CB (2020–present)
- Arena: Palacio de Deportes
- Capacity: 4,815
- Location: Cartagena, Spain
- Team colors: Black, white, yellow and crimson
- President: David Ayala
- Head coach: Félix Alonso
- Ownership: FC Cartagena
- Championships: 1 LEB Plata
- Website: www.fccartagena.es
Home	Away

Basket Cartagena, also known as ODILO FC Cartagena CB for sponsorship reasons, is a basketball club based in Cartagena, Spain. The team plays in the Primera FEB. It home arena is the Palacio de Deportes de Cartagena.

== History ==
Founded in 2007, Basket Cartagena began a new project to try to inspire hope to the local fans, from the Primera Autonómica, with the trouble of finding players who made up a roster with guarantees and aspirations for promotion to the Liga EBA.

From its creation in 2007 until 2013, the club leaded by Pedro Collado played in the Primera Autonómica and the Primera Nacional. In 2012, it achieved promotion to Liga EBA on the courts, but it refused to promote weeks later.

One year after this resignation, in 2013, it accepted one of the vacant berths to play in the Liga EBA. During the first three seasons in the Liga EBA, the team was coached by Pepe García. In the 2016–17 season, Paco Guillem took charge of the team as head coach, with the aim to achieve promotion to the LEB Plata in the following seasons.

In summer 2020, several basketball teams from Cartagena, Spain merged in a single structure, leaving Pedro Collado the presidency of the club, after 13 years in office, in the hands of David Ayala. Months later, it became part of the structure of FC Cartagena, becoming known as FC Cartagena CB.

In the 2020–21 season, after being reinforced in the winter window with players like Mansour Kasse, Juan Ignacio Jasen and José Antonio Marco, it achieved second position in the second phase of the Conference E of the Liga EBA, achieving the qualification for the promotion playoffs to the LEB Plata. On May 15, 2021, it achieved the promotion to the LEB Plata, after finishing first in its group of the promotion playoffs, after beating Movistar Estudiantes B, AEA Solidaria Llucmajor and Ciudad de Huelva.

In the 2021–22 season, it finished the regular season in fourth position in the Group East in it first season in the LEB Plata. In round of 16, it was eliminated by ENERparking Basket Navarra. In the 2022–23 season, it finished the regular season in seventh position in the Group East. In the round of 16, it was eliminated by Teknei Bizkaia Zornotza.

In the 2023–24 season, with the signing of Jordi Juste on the bench, it was runner-up in the Copa LEB Plata and finished the regular season in first position in the Group East. In the group champions' playoffs, it beat Zamora Enamora in the second leg, overcoming the nine points from the first leg and achieved promotion to the Primera FEB.

== Sponsorship naming ==
Basket Cartagena has had several denominations through the years due to its sponsorship:

- UPCT Basket Cartagena: 2007–08, 2013–20
- FC Cartagena CB: 2020–22
- ODILO FC Cartagena CB: 2022–present

== Home arenas ==
- Pabellón Central de Cartagena: (2013–20)
- Palacio de Deportes de Cartagena: (2020–present)

== Players ==
=== Current roster ===
Note: Flags indicate national team eligibility at FIBA-sanctioned events. Players may hold other non-FIBA nationalities not displayed.

Basket Cartagena roster
Players
Coaches

Pos.	No.	Nat.	Name	Ht.	Age
C	1	(United States)	Polynice, Chayce	2.11 m (6 ft 11 in)	25 – 1 January 2001
SF	2	(Spain)	Garuba, Sediq	1.93 m (6 ft 4 in)	22 – 2 February 2004
SG	4	(United States) (Dominican Republic)	Rivera, Isaiah	1.96 m (6 ft 5 in)	25 – 4 September 2001
PG	5	(Spain)	Martín, Alberto	1.80 m (5 ft 11 in)	31 – 28 March 1995
SG	10	(United States)	Webster, Kobe	1.93 m (6 ft 4 in)	27 – 31 July 1999
C	11	(Spain)	Idehen, Robinson	2.10 m (6 ft 11 in)	28 – 17 November 1997
PF	12	(Spain)	Domenech, Adrià	2.08 m (6 ft 10 in)	24 – 18 July 2002
PF/C	13	(Brazil) (Spain)	Faverani, Vítor	2.11 m (6 ft 11 in)	38 – 5 May 1988
SG	15	(Spain)	Ayesa, Miguel	1.93 m (6 ft 4 in)	24 – 31 August 2002
PF	17	(Spain)	Martí, Marc	2.03 m (6 ft 8 in)	29 – 19 June 1997
PF	19	(Spain)	Harguindey, Alejandro	2.00 m (6 ft 7 in)	24 – 9 September 2002
G/F	20	(United States) (Czech Republic)	Svejcar, Spencer	1.93 m (6 ft 4 in)	31 – 8 November 1994

Head coach

- (Spain) Félix Alonso

Legend

- (C) Team captain
- Injured

- Roster
Updated: February 5, 2026

=== Depth chart ===
Pos.	Starting 5	Bench 1	Bench 2
C	Robinson Idehen	Chayce Polynice
PF	Adrià Domenech	Vítor Faverani	Marc Martí
SF	Sediq Garuba	Spencer Svejcar
SG	Kobe Webster	Miguel Ayesa
PG	Isaiah Rivera	Alberto Martín

Colours: Blue = homegrown player; Red = non–FIBA Europe player

== Head coaches ==
- Pepe García: 2013–16
- Paco Guillem: 2016–21
- Gustavo Aranzana: 2021–23
- Jordi Juste: 2023–2025
- Félix Alonso: 2025–present

== Trophies and awards ==
=== Trophies ===
- LEB Plata: (1)
  - 2024
- Copa LEB Plata:
  - Runners-up (1): 2024

== Season by season ==
Season	Tier	Division	Pos.	W–L	Cup competitions	
2007–08	6	1ª Autonómica	2nd	14–8		
2008–09	5	1ª Nacional	9th	8–18		
2009–10	5	1ª Nacional	9th	11–15		
2010–11	5	1ª Nacional	3rd	22–4		
2011–12	5	1ª Nacional	2nd (Note: Refused to promote to Liga EBA.)	24–5		
2012–13	5	1ª Nacional	5th (Note: Achieved a vacant berth to play in Liga EBA.)	16–10		
2013–14	4	Liga EBA	9th	13–15		
2014–15	4	Liga EBA	3rd	19–12		
2015–16	4	Liga EBA	9th	6–20		
2016–17	4	Liga EBA	2nd	15–14		
2017–18	4	Liga EBA	9th	13–14		
2018–19	4	Liga EBA	13th	11–13		
2019–20	4	Liga EBA	14th (Note: Season curtailed in response to the COVID-19 pandemic.)	4–20		
2020–21	4	Liga EBA	2nd	23–7		
2021–22	3	LEB Plata	13th	16–12		
2022–23	3	LEB Plata	14th	14–14		
2023–24	3	LEB Plata	1st	22–6	Copa LEB Plata	RU
2024–25	2	Primera FEB	7th	18–21	Spain Cup	SF
2025–26	2	Primera FEB	16th	8–24	Spain Cup	R32
2026–27	3	Segunda FEB			Spain Cup	GS
