= Cultural y Deportiva Leonesa (basketball) =

- Nickname: Cultural, Cultu
- League: Segunda FEB
- Founded: 22 June 2022; 2 years ago
- Arena: Palacio de los Deportes de León
- Capacity: 5,188
- Location: León, Spain
- Team colors: White and red
- President: Felipe Llamazares
- Head coach: Luis Castillo
- Ownership: Cultural y Deportiva Leonesa
- Website: cydleonesa.com
Home	Away

Cultural y Deportiva Leonesa Baloncesto is the basketball section of the namesake club. Founded in 2022, the team plays in the Segunda FEB. Its home arena is the Palacio de los Deportes de León.

== History ==
The basketball section of Cultural Leonesa was founded in 2022 by former Liga ACB referee Felipe Llamazares, by merging the local teams CB Reino de León and Basket León, that appeared after the dissolution of former Liga ACB team Baloncesto León in 2012.

On 12 May 2024, after winning the A-B Group of the Liga EBA in its second season, the team achieved promotion to Segunda FEB in Gandia.

== Home arenas ==
- Palacio de los Deportes de León: (2022–present)

== Head coaches ==
- Luis Castillo 2022–present

== Season by season ==
Season	Tier	Division	Pos.	W–L	Cup competitions
2022–23	4	Liga EBA	4th	18–8	
2023–24	4	Liga EBA	1st	27–3	
