= Palacio Municipal de Deportes San Pablo =

Sports arena in Seville, Spain

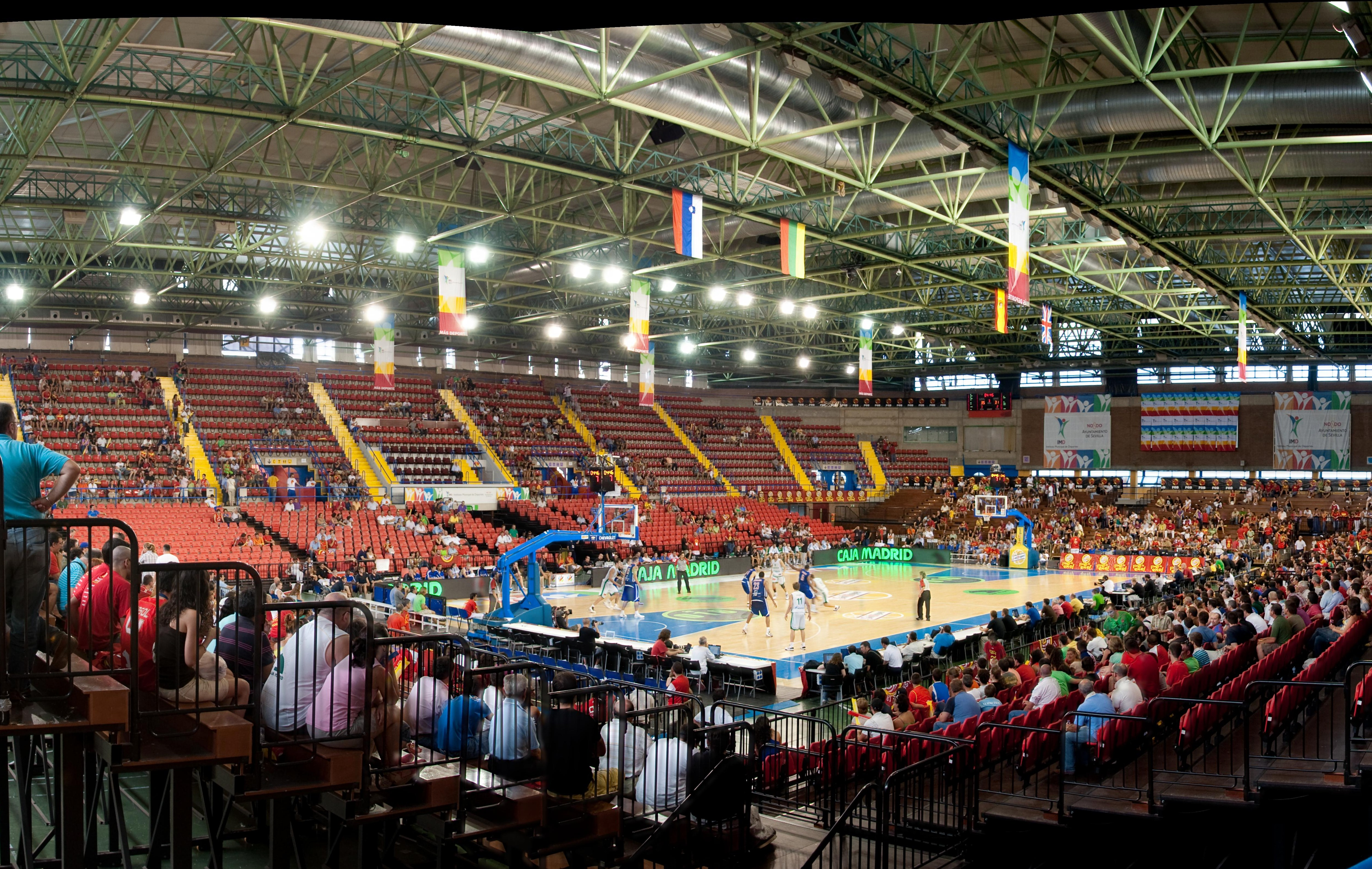
- Interactive map of Palacio Municipal de Deportes San Pablo
- Location: Seville, Spain
- Coordinates: 37°23′47.55″N 5°57′52.15″W
- Owner: Ayuntamiento de Sevilla
- Capacity: Basketball: 7,626 (permanent tiers); 10,200 (additional tiers)
- Surface: Parquet

Construction
- Built: May 1987
- Expanded: 1991

Tenant
- Caja 87 Baloncesto

Palacio Municipal De Deportes San Pablo is a municipally-owned multi-use arena in Seville, Spain. It hosts the home games of basketball team Caja 87 Baloncesto. The arena can hold up to 10,200 people.

It opened in May 1987.

== Events ==
It hosted the European Aquatics Championships in August 1997 and also one of the group stages in the 2014 FIBA Basketball World Cup.

== See also ==
- List of indoor arenas in Spain

Preceded by Budapest Sportcsarnok; Budapest	IAAF World Indoor Championships in Athletics; Venue; 1991	Succeeded by SkyDome; Toronto
Preceded by Pavilhão Rosa Mota; Porto	European Men's Handball Championship; Final Venue; 1996	Succeeded by PalaOnda; Bolzano
