= 2015 Eurocup Finals =

2015 Eurocup finals
- Event: 2014–15 Eurocup Basketball
Herbalife Gran Canaria	Khimki
(Spain)	(Russia)
130	174

First leg
Herbalife Gran Canaria	Khimki
66	91
- Date: April 25, 2015
- Venue: Gran Canaria Arena, Las Palmas
- MVP: (Montenegro) Tyrese Rice
- Attendance: 9,875

Second leg
Khimki	Herbalife Gran Canaria
83	64
- Date: April 29, 2015
- Venue: Basketball Center, Khimki
- Attendance: 3,850

The 2015 Eurocup finals were the concluding two games of the 2014–15 Eurocup Basketball season. BC Khimki and Herbalife Gran Canaria faced off in a two-legged series.

It was the third time that Khimki played in a Eurocup Finals, after their league title in 2011 and being runners-up in 2009. For Gran Canaria, it was the first-ever Finals appearance after they never reached a stage further than the quarterfinals in history. The winner of the Finals would play in the 2015–16 Euroleague regular season.

== Road to the Finals ==
(Spain) Herbalife Gran Canaria				Round	(Russia) Khimki			
1st place (10–0) (Group B)				Regular season	1st place (8–2) (Group D)			
1st place (5–1) (Group H)				Round of 32	1st place (5–1) (Group J)			
Opponent	Agg.	1st leg	2nd leg	Knockout stage	Opponent	Agg.	1st leg	2nd leg
(Croatia) Cedevita	159–148	84–76	75–72	Eightfinals	(Russia) Zenit Saint Petersburg	175–154	86–84	89–70
(Turkey) Pınar Karşıyaka	151–140	76–66	75–74	Quarterfinals	(Spain) Valencia	152–136	76–75	76–61
(Russia) UNICS	161–146	83–70	78–76	Semifinals	(Turkey) Banvit	175–172	82–83	93–89

== First leg ==
24 April 2015
20:45

Boxscore

Herbalife Gran Canaria (Spain)	66–91	(Russia) Khimki
Scoring by quarter: 19–21, 14–19, 21–19, 12–32
Pts: Kuric 23; Rebs: Báez 7 Asts: Oliver 4 PIR: Kuric 21		Pts: Koponen, Vyaltsev 18; Rebs: three players 6 Asts: Rice 5 PIR: Davis 22

Gran Canaria Arena, Las Palmas
Attendance: 9,875
Referees: Fernando Rocha (POR), Roberto Chiari (ITA), Rüştü Nuran (TUR)

Gran Canaria	Khimki

Starters:			P	R	A
PG	11	(Spain) Tomás Bellas	3	0	3
SG	10	(Spain) Txemi Urtasun	0	1	2
SF	24	(United States) Kyle Kuric	23	2	0
PF	14	(Dominican Republic) Eulis Báez	18	7	1
C	13	(Cape Verde) Walter Tavares	4	4	1
Reserves:			P	R	A
PG	4	(Spain) Albert Oliver	7	2	4
SF	8	(Australia) Brad Newley	2	2	0
C	14	(Canada) Levon Kendall	1	3	2
PG	15	(Spain) Joaquín Portugués	DNP		
PF	21	(Spain) Oriol Paulí	3	1	0
PF	25	(United States) Ian O'Leary	5	1	0
SF	35	(United States) DaJuan Summers	DNP		
Head coach:
(Spain) Aíto García Reneses

Starters:			P	R	A
PG	0	(Montenegro) Tyrese Rice	13	2	5
SG	9	(Russia) Egor Vyaltsev	18	3	4
PF	12	(Russia) Sergei Monia	9	6	3
PF	11	(Russia) Stanislav Ilnitskiy	5	4	0
C	40	(United States) Paul Davis	17	6	1
Reserves:			P	R	A
PF	5	(United States) James Augustine	9	6	2
PG	6	(Croatia) Marko Popović	DNP		
C	7	(Russia) Ruslan Pateev	DNP		
PG	8	(Finland) Petteri Koponen	18	2	3
SG	34	(Russia) Maxim Shakharov	DNP		
SF	45	(Russia) Maxim Sheleketo	2	2	0
Head coach:
(Lithuania) Rimas Kurtinaitis

== Second leg ==
29 April 2015
18:30

Boxscore

Khimki (Russia)	83–64	(Spain) Herbalife Gran Canaria
Scoring by quarter: 27–18, 18–12, 23–16, 15–18
Pts: Augustine 18; Rebs: Davis 10; Asts: Popović 7 PIR: Davis 20		Pts: Tavares 17; Rebs: Tavares 10; Asts: Kendall 3 PIR: Tavares 23

Basketball Center, Khimki
Attendance: 3,850
Referees: Sasa Pukl (SLO), Milivoje Jovcic (SRB), Ioannis Foufis (GRE)

Khimki	Gran Canaria

Starters:			P	R	A
PG	0	(Montenegro) Tyrese Rice	16	3	6
SG	9	(Russia) Egor Vyaltsev	7	3	2
PF	12	(Russia) Sergei Monia	2	4	1
PF	11	(Russia) Stanislav Ilnitskiy	2	1	0
C	40	(United States) Paul Davis	16	10	0
Reserves:			P	R	A
PF	5	(United States) James Augustine	18	0	1
PG	6	(Croatia) Marko Popović	2	2	7
C	7	(Russia) Ruslan Pateev	2	2	0
PG	8	(Finland) Petteri Koponen	13	5	4
SG	34	(Russia) Maxim Shakharov	DNP		
SF	45	(Russia) Maxim Sheleketo	5	6	0
Head coach:
(Lithuania) Rimas Kurtinaitis

2014–15 Eurocup champions

Khimki
2nd title

Starters:			P	R	A
PG	11	(Spain) Tomás Bellas	5	5	4
SF	8	(Australia) Brad Newley	12	2	1
SF	24	(United States) Kyle Kuric	8	2	2
PF	14	(Dominican Republic) Eulis Báez	6	5	3
C	13	(Cape Verde) Walter Tavares	17	10	0
Reserves:			P	R	A
PG	4	(Spain) Albert Oliver	0	2	0
SG	10	(Spain) Txemi Urtasun	5	1	1
C	14	(Canada) Levon Kendall	6	6	1
PG	15	(Spain) Joaquín Portugués	DNP		
PF	21	(Spain) Oriol Paulí	3	0	0
PF	25	(United States) Ian O'Leary	2	0	0
SF	35	(United States) DaJuan Summers	DNP		
Head coach:
(Spain) Aíto García Reneses

== See also ==
- 2015 Euroleague Final Four
- 2015 EuroChallenge Final Four
