= 2019–20 Círculo Gijón season =

Círculo Gijón Season

Círculo Gijón
2019–20 season
- Chairman: Carlos Rodellar
- Head coach: Nacho Galán
- Arena: Palacio de Deportes
- LEB Plata: Ongoing
Home	Away

The 2019–20 Círculo Gijón season is the third in existence and their second season in LEB Plata, the Spanish third division.

== Overview ==
=== Pre-season ===
Despite being relegated to Liga EBA at the end of the previous season, Círculo Gijón remained in the league as a result of a swap of places with Baskonia B, that finished one position over the geometrics.

=== Season ===
The season was suspended due to COVID-19 pandemic.

== Players ==
=== Squad information ===
Note: Flags indicate national team eligibility at FIBA-sanctioned events. Players may hold other non-FIBA nationalities not displayed.

Círculo Gijón roster
Players
Coaches

Pos.	No.	Nat.	Name	Ht.	Age
SF	13	(Dominican Republic)	Adón, Gregorio	2.02 m (6 ft 8 in)	34 – 12 April 1991
PF		(United States)	Amius, Mike	2.01 m (6 ft 7 in)	29 – 22 September 1996
SG		(United States)	Ebel, Nolan	1.86 m (6 ft 1 in)	−1994–1995 – January 1996
PG	7	(Spain)	Lada, Edu	1.93 m (6 ft 4 in)	37 – 24 March 1988
SF	20	(Spain)	Llano, Jaime	2.01 m (6 ft 7 in)	29 – 8 March 1996
PF	12	(Spain)	Menéndez, Javi	2.02 m (6 ft 8 in)	28 – 5 August 1997
PG	3	(Spain)	Moro, Ángel (C)	1.82 m (6 ft 0 in)	31 – 11 October 1993
PG	21	(Spain)	Portugués, Joaquín	1.86 m (6 ft 1 in)	30 – 21 September 1995
C	17	(Spain)	Poyatos, Carlos	2.07 m (6 ft 9 in)	30 – 17 October 1994
SF	9	(Canada)	Reynolds, Jamal	1.93 m (6 ft 4 in)	31 – 27 February 1994
C		(United States)	Swift, Robert	2.16 m (7 ft 1 in)	39 – 3 December 1985
SG	25	(United States)	Ukawuba, Rob	1.91 m (6 ft 3 in)	30 – 2 December 1994

Head coach

- (Spain) Nacho Galán

Legend

- (C) Team captain
- Injured

- Roster
Updated: December 29, 2019

=== Transactions ===
==== In ====
Only Menéndez and Moro continue in the team. Captain Saúl Blanco left the team for joining French Pro B team Gries.

Pos.	Nat.	Name	Age	Moving from		Date	Source
C	(Sweden)	Henrik Jädersten	24	Santa Clara Broncos	(United States)	11 July 2019	
PG	(Spain)	Joaquín Portugués	24	Wetterbygden Stars	(Sweden)	19 July 2019	
SF	(Canada)	Jamal Reynolds	25	Cape Breton Highlanders	(Canada)	19 July 2019	
SG	(Spain)	Edu Lada	31	Liberbank Oviedo B	(Spain)	20 July 2019	
SF	(Dominican Republic)	Gregorio Adón	28	Jafep Globalcaja La Roda	(Spain)	22 July 2019	
SG	(United States)	Rob Ukawuba	24	Innova Chef	(Spain)	23 July 2019	
C	(Spain)	Carlos Poyatos	24	Hestia Menorca	(Spain)	25 July 2019	
C	(Australia)	Mackuei Puondak	25	Hume City Broncos	(Australia)	6 August 2019	
PF	(Spain)	Jaime Llano	23	Gijón Basket	(Spain)	7 August 2019	
C	(United States)	Robert Swift	34	Free agent		29 December 2019	
PF	(United States)	Mike Amius	23	Feurs Enfants du Forez	(France)	20 January 2020	
SG	(United States)	Nolan Ebel	23	Augustana Vikings	(United States)	21 January 2020	

==== Out ====
Pos.	Nat.	Name	Age	Moving to	Date	Source
C	(Australia)	Mackuei Poundak	25	Free agent	28 December 2019	

== Pre-season and friendlies ==
1 September 2019 Friendly	Igualatorio Cantabria Estela	85–91	Círculo Gijón	Torrelavega
19:00	Scoring by quarter: 20–15, 23–20, 25–24, 17–32
	Pts: Sutina 13	Boxscore	Pts: Reynolds 21	Arena: Vicente Trueba; Attendance: 350

7 September 2019 Friendly	Círculo Gijón	70–77	Igualatorio Cantabria Estela	Gijón
20:00	Scoring by quarter: 17–22, 16–18, 13–18, 24–19
	Pts: Reynolds 25	Boxscore	Pts: Sanz 19	Arena: Palacio de Deportes

=== Trofeo Principado de Asturias ===
13 September 2019 Semifinal	Huniko Gijón Basket	69–79	Círculo Gijón	Gijón
20:00	Scoring by quarter: 12–22, 11–22, 21–21, 25–14
	Pts: Fernández 15	Boxscore	Pts: Reynolds 25	Arena: Palacio de Deportes

15 September 2019 Final	Liberbank Oviedo Baloncesto	76–64	Círculo Gijón	Oviedo
19:00	Scoring by quarter: 17–18, 16–15, 18–12, 25–19
	Pts: Wright 16	Boxscore	Pts: Adón, Ukawuba 12	Arena: Pumarín

== LEB Plata ==
=== First stage ===
==== League table (Group West) ====
Pos	Team	Pld	W	L	PF	PA	PD	Pts	Qualification
8	Bodegas Rioja Vega	22	10	12	1569	1591	−22	32	Qualification to Group A2
9	CB Morón	22	10	12	1652	1670	−18	32	Qualification to Group A2
10	Basket Navarra	22	9	13	1714	1712	+2	31	Qualification to Group A2
11	Círculo Gijón	22	8	14	1649	1737	−88	30	Qualification to Group A2
12	Zornotza ST	22	7	15	1605	1645	−40	29	Qualification to Group A2

Source: FEB

==== Results summary ====
Overall						Home					Away				
Pld	W	L	PF	PA	PD	W	L	PF	PA	PD	W	L	PF	PA	PD
12	5	7	919	952	−33	5	2	567	530	+37	0	5	352	422	−70

Source: FEB.es

==== Results by round ====
Round	1	2	3	4	5	6	7	8	9	10	11	12	13	14	15	16	17	18	19	20	21	22
Ground	A	H	A	H	H	A	H	A	H	A	H	H	A	H	A	A	H	A	H	A	H	A
Result	L	W	L	W	W	L	L	L	W	L	W	W	L	W	L							
Position	8	7	8	7	6	7	7	9	7	10	8	8	8	8	10							

Source: FEB.es
A = Away; H = Home; W = Win; L = Loss

==== Matches ====
22 September 2019 1	Zornotza Saskibaloi Taldea	73–65	Círculo Gijón	Amorebieta-Etxano
18:30	Scoring by quarter: 16–16, 11–22, 25–16, 21–11
	Pts: Plaisance, Sakhniuk 18; Rebs: Plaisance 9 Asts: Olivier 5 PIR: Plaisance 30	Boxscore	Pts: Reynolds 14; Rebs: Menéndez 11; Asts: Portugués, Ukawuba 4 PIR: Menéndez 20	Arena: Larrea; Referees: Martínez Estopiñán, Gómez Hernández

28 September 2019 2	Círculo Gijón	80–75(OT)	CB Marbella	Gijón
20:00	Scoring by quarter: 17–19, 12–17, 22–13, 20–22, Overtime: 9–4
	Pts: Reynolds 32; Rebs: Reynolds 11; Asts: Portugués 7 PIR: Reynolds 44	Boxscore	Pts: Fuentes 21; Rebs: Diatta 14; Asts: three players 1 PIR: Cameron 15	Arena: Palacio de Deportes; Referees: Esteve Malmierca, Álvarez-Ossorio Varela

2 October 2019 3	Juaristi ISB	84–62	Círculo Gijón	Azpeitia
20:30	Scoring by quarter: 14–19, 28–11, 21–20, 21–12
	Pts: Guridi, Lowrance 14; Rebs: Dziuba, Lowrance 7 Asts: Reaves 3 PIR: Guridi 15	Boxscore	Pts: Adón 23; Rebs: Adón 10; Asts: Jädersten 2 PIR: Adón 32	Arena: Municipal; Referees: Checa Nebot, Sastre del Río

6 October 2019 4	Círculo Gijón	78–67	Bodegas Rioja Vega	Gijón
19:00	Scoring by quarter: 13–11, 19–15, 25–18, 21–23
	Pts: Adón 17; Rebs: Menéndez 10; Asts: Portugués, Reynolds 5 PIR: Adón, Menéndez 16	Boxscore	Pts: Justice 15; Rebs: Alderete 3 Asts: Jordá, Spyridonidis 7 PIR: Spyridonidis 17	Arena: Palacio de Deportes; Referees: Garvin Domingo, Rilo Antelo

12 October 2019 5	Círculo Gijón	77–73	Cat&Rest Intragas-Clima CDP	Gijón
20:00	Scoring by quarter: 19–20, 16–14, 17–15, 25–24
	Pts: Reynolds 23; Rebs: Reynolds 12; Asts: Portugués 7 PIR: Reynolds 31	Boxscore	Pts: Casanova 22; Rebs: Soárez 9 Asts: Fernández 4 PIR: Casanova 16	Arena: Palacio de Deportes; Referees: González Zumajo, Puig Batlló

18 October 2019 6	Basket Navarra	94–84	Círculo Gijón	Pamplona
20:30	Scoring by quarter: 27–20, 22–16, 20–32, 25–16
	Pts: Narros 18; Rebs: Thomas 9 Asts: Thomas 8 PIR: Thomas 20	Boxscore	Pts: Adón 26; Rebs: Adón, Menéndez 6 Asts: Portugués 8 PIR: Adón 32	Arena: Arrosadia; Referees: Chiva López, Benavente Parra

26 October 2019 7	Círculo Gijón	73–77	CB Morón	Gijón
20:00	Scoring by quarter: 16–21, 11–16, 25–17, 21–23
	Pts: Poyatos 19; Rebs: Jädersten, Menéndez 8 Asts: Adón, Moro 2 PIR: Poyatos 25	Boxscore	Pts: Marco 13; Rebs: Gelazonia 5 Asts: Marco 3 PIR: Marco 18	Arena: Palacio de Deportes; Referees: Domingo Vilalta, Pellitero González

2 November 2019 8	Innova Chef	100–82	Círculo Gijón	Zamora
17:00	Scoring by quarter: 18–13, 29–25, 25–25, 28–19
	Pts: Nicholas 27; Rebs: Cabral 9 Asts: Samar 6 PIR: Nicholas 34	Boxscore	Pts: Reynolds 21; Rebs: Reynolds 9 Asts: three players 1 PIR: Reynolds 27	Arena: Ángel Nieto; Referees: Ávila Zurita, Garrido Tornero

9 November 2019 9	Círculo Gijón	88–78	Igualatorio Cantabria Estela	Gijón
20:00	Scoring by quarter: 24–25, 18–22, 25–9, 21–22
	Pts: Adón 20; Rebs: three players 6 Asts: Portugués 5 PIR: Reynolds 31	Boxscore	Pts: Puondak 22; Rebs: Sanz 14; Asts: three players 2 PIR: Toledo 17	Arena: Palacio de Deportes; Referees: Villanueva Tena, Del Val Nuño

16 November 2019 10	Enerdrink UDEA Algeciras	71–59	Círculo Gijón	Algeciras
20:30	Scoring by quarter: 13–14, 21–11, 21–16, 16–18
	Pts: Kaliničenko 19; Rebs: Ejim 21; Asts: Ortega 5 PIR: Ejim 28	Boxscore	Pts: Adón 25; Rebs: Menéndez 10; Asts: Moro 5 PIR: Adón 25	Arena: Doctor Juan Carlos Mateo; Referees: Patricio López, Sastre del Río

23 November 2019 11	Círculo Gijón	81–88	UBU Tizona	Gijón
20:00	Scoring by quarter: 26–22, 13–19, 17–21, 25–26
	Pts: Reynolds 21; Rebs: Menéndez 10; Asts: Portugués 3 PIR: Reynolds 20	Boxscore	Pts: Ruiz de Galarreta 23; Rebs: Kody, Ruiz de Galarreta 6 Asts: Fernández 3 PIR: Ruiz de Galarreta 26	Arena: Palacio de Deportes; Referees: Gómez Hernández, Álvarez-Ossorio Varela

1 December 2019 12	Círculo Gijón	90–82	Zornotza Saskibaloi Taldea	Gijón
19:00	Scoring by quarter: 23–14, 28–18, 23–12, 16–28
	Pts: Reynolds 21; Rebs: Poyatos 7 Asts: Adón, Moro 3 PIR: Reynolds 26	Boxscore	Pts: Frías, Sakhniuk 18; Rebs: Sakhniuk 8 Asts: three players 2 PIR: Sakhniuk 24	Arena: Palacio de Deportes; Referees: Gómez Hernández, Álvarez-Ossorio Varela

7 December 2019 13	CB Marbella	70–66	Círculo Gijón	Marbella
18:00	Scoring by quarter: 18–15, 23–15, 11–14, 18–22
	Pts: Kimbrough 18; Rebs: Jiménez 7 Asts: three players 3 PIR: Navajas 16	Boxscore	Pts: Menéndez 22; Rebs: Menéndez 11; Asts: Adón 5 PIR: Menéndez 36	Arena: Carlos Cabezas; Referees: Ávila Zurita, García Martín

14 December 2019 14	Círculo Gijón	75–72	Juaristi ISB	Gijón
20:00	Scoring by quarter: 14–17, 18–16, 24–11, 19–28
	Pts: Adón 23; Rebs: Menéndez 9 Asts: Portugués 4 PIR: Adón 20	Boxscore	Pts: Reaves 20; Rebs: Lowrance 5 Asts: Lowrance 2 PIR: Powell 15	Arena: Palacio de Deportes; Referees: Pinela García, Pellitero González
