= 2018–19 Círculo Gijón season =

TeslaCard Círculo Gijón
2018–19 season
- Chairman: Iván Menéndez
- Head coach: Nacho Galán
- Arena: Palacio de Deportes
- LEB Plata: 19th (relegated)
- PIR leader: Shane Osayande 18.4
- Scoring leader: Saúl Blanco 15.3
- Rebounding leader: Shane Osayande 9.4
- Assists leader: Saúl Blanco 2.9
- Highest home attendance: 1,600; Círculo 57–58 Juaristi ISB (30 December 2018)
- Lowest home attendance: 600; Círculo 63–59 Clavijo (14 November 2018)
- Average home attendance: 1,075
Home	Away

The 2018–19 Círculo Gijón season was their second in existence and their debut in professional basketball, after achieving one of the vacant places in LEB Plata, third division, after the expansion. The club was called TeslaCard Círculo Gijón for sponsorship reasons.

== Overview ==
=== Pre-season ===
After failing to promote to Liga EBA in the club's first season, Círculo Gijón achieved one of the eight places created after the expansion of the LEB Plata from 16 to 24 teams.

Despite the sporting failure, Nacho Galán, owner, decided to continue as head coach and only former NBA player Robert Swift and Junior Johnson continued in the club. With the aim to promote Asturian players, Círculo Gijón signed four of them: former ACB and EuroLeague player Saúl Blanco, former LEB Plata Javier Menéndez, Alejandro Rubiera from local Liga EBA team Gijón Basket and Ángel Moro, who played two years ago also at Gijón Basket.

=== First stage ===
On 6 October 2018, Círculo Gijón beat Ávila Auténtica Carrefour "El Bulevar" in their debut in the professional basketball by 75–67. Four days later, the team lost their first match by wasting the work made in the first half against Quesería La Antigua CB Tormes with a disastrous third quarter, lost by 8–25. Osayande was the best player by performing 18 points and 12 rebounds and Nelson Yengue made his debut with the team. The week ended with the first home loss, against Basket Navarra Club. Despite winning the first quarter by 16 points, with nine three-points shots made, Navarra won the match thanks to a shot of Carles Marzo with only nine-tenths of a second left.

The bad streak continued on 21 October, at Azpeitia, with a 74–72 loss against Juaristi ISB after an overtime. With this third loss, Círculo Gijón was dropped to the last position of the Group West.

On 12 December, Círculo Gijón announced the come back of former Gijón Baloncesto point guard Rubén Suárez, that played with the club in the previous season. Subsequently, Junior Johnson was waived. In his first match, Círculo Gijón beat Quesería La Antigua CB Tormes by 78–66, continuing the team's good streak at home, with three consecutive wins. On 30 December, Círculo Gijón lost in the last second against Juaristi ISB in a match where point guard Ángel Moro was injured for the rest of the season. This was the first match of South African Pieter Prinsloo that, despite being signed in August, could not play with the club due to bureaucratic problems.

On 19 January, Círculo Gijón lost a very controversial home match against Aquimisa Laboratorios Queso Zamorano. After being losing by 14 points at the end of the third quarter, the Geometrics took the lead of the game when, with 1:30 left, Saúl Blanco was disqualified as being called an unsportsmanlike foul to him and a technical foul to Zamora player Anthony Libroia, thus meaning the visitors having one more free shot and recovering the possession.

One week later, despite losing at Bodegas Rioja Vega, Shane Osayande was named MVP of the week with a Performance Index Rating of 30.

Círculo Gijón ended the first stage with three consecutive wins for reaching the ninth position with nine wins and 13 losses. The club would start the group for avoiding the relegation with six wins and four losses.

=== Second stage ===
Círculo Gijón started the second stage with a huge home win against Arcos Albacete Basket by 79–62. Osayande, with 19 points 20 rebounds and four blocks, was chosen MVP of the week. However, the injury of Saúl Blanco, which only played a couple of minutes in the win against Albacete, dropped the team to the relegation positions after six consecutive losses.

Point guard Davy Baltus was fired in the week previous to the match of the seventh round against Torrons Vicens CB L'Hospitalet, that meant the come back of Saúl Blanco and a new win by beating the Catalans by a huge 86–52. However, despite winning four of the last five games, Círculo Gijón could not avoid relegation.

Saúl Blanco was named member of the team of the season.

== Players ==
=== Squad information ===
Note: Flags indicate national team eligibility at FIBA-sanctioned events. Players may hold other non-FIBA nationalities not displayed.

TeslaCard Círculo Gijón roster
Players
Coaches

Pos.	No.	Nat.	Name	Ht.	Age
PG	6	(France)	Baltus, Davy	1.88 m (6 ft 2 in)	35 – 22 October 1991
SF	21	(Spain)	Blanco, Saúl	1.96 m (6 ft 5 in)	41 – 16 May 1985
C	11	(Serbia)	Đorđević, Nemanja	2.03 m (6 ft 8 in)	31 – 10 May 1995
PG	0	(United States)	Johnson, Junior	1.80 m (5 ft 11 in)	37 – 5 September 1989
SG	14	(United States)	Kimbrough, Martyce	1.85 m (6 ft 1 in)	30 – 8 January 1996
PF	12	(Spain)	Menéndez, Javier	2.02 m (6 ft 8 in)	29 – 5 August 1997
PG	3	(Spain)	Moro, Ángel (injured)	1.82 m (6 ft 0 in)	33 – 11 October 1993
PF	22	(Canada)	Osayande, Shane	2.01 m (6 ft 7 in)	33 – 20 January 1993
C	34	(South Africa)	Prinsloo, Pieter	2.08 m (6 ft 10 in)	34 – 7 January 1992
SG	7	(Spain)	Rubiera, Alejandro	1.90 m (6 ft 3 in)	28 – 17 April 1998
PG	10	(Spain)	Suárez, Rubén (C)	1.87 m (6 ft 2 in)	48 – 14 January 1978
C	31	(United States)	Swift, Robert	2.16 m (7 ft 1 in)	40 – 3 December 1985
SF	23	(Cameroon)	Yengue, Nelson	1.91 m (6 ft 3 in)	34 – 1 March 1992

Head coach

- (Spain) Nacho Galán

Legend

- (C) Team captain
- Injured

==== In ====
From the previous season, only Robert Swift and Junior Johnson continued in the club. Rubén Suárez came back during the season after his retirement.

Pos.	Nat.	Name	Age	Moving from		Date	Source
PG	(Spain)	Ángel Moro	24	Cazorla Jaén Paraíso Interior	(Spain)	23 July 2018	
SG	(Spain)	Alejandro Rubiera	20	Gijón Basket	(Spain)	27 July 2018	
PF	(Spain)	Javier Menéndez	21	NM Highlands Cowboys	(United States)	10 August 2018	
SG	(United States)	Martyce Kimbrough	22	Findlay Oilers	(United States)	15 August 2018	
SF	(Cameroon)	Nelson Yengue	26	Laurentian Voyageurs	(Canada)	22 August 2018	
SF	(Spain)	Saúl Blanco	33	Prat	(Spain)	27 August 2018	
PF	(Canada)	Shane Osayande	25	Saskatchewan Huskies	(Canada)	29 August 2018	
PF	(Serbia)	Nemanja Đorđević	23	Tamiš	(Serbia)	4 September 2018	
C	(South Africa)	Pieter Prinsloo	26	Toros de Aragua	(Venezuela)	4 October 2018	
PG	(Spain)	Rubén Suárez	40	Free agent		11 December 2018	
PG	(France)	Davy Baltus	27	Uppsala	(Sweden)	24 January 2019	

==== Out ====
As a result of promoting two divisions, Círculo Gijón changed all its roster before the season. During the season, Davy Baltus was fired due to disciplinary issues.

Pos.	Nat.	Name	Age	Moving to	Date	Source
PG	(France)	Davy Baltus	27	Free agent	12 April 2019	

== Club ==
=== Technical staff ===
Position	Staff
Head coach	Nacho Galán
Assistant coach	Óscar Moro
Assistant coach	Emilio Pérez
Physical trainer	Jonás Vigil

Source: Círculo Gijón

== Pre-season and friendlies ==
9 September 2018 Trofeo Virgen de Valencia	Pas Piélagos	52–60	TeslaCard Círculo Gijón	Renedo de Piélagos
18:00	Scoring by quarter: 11–14, 10–18, 16–17, 15–11
		Boxscore		Arena: Fernando Expósito

15 September 2018 Trofeo Concello de Chantada	Ucoga Seguros CB Chantada	52–75	TeslaCard Círculo Gijón	Chantada
19:30
			Pts: Osayande 26	Arena: Municipal

22 September 2018 Friendly	TeslaCard Círculo Gijón	64–70	Liberbank Oviedo Baloncesto	Gijón
18:00	Scoring by quarter: 20–18, 17–16, 16–13, 11–23
	Pts: Blanco 17	Boxscore	Pts: Puerto 14	Arena: Palacio de Deportes; Attendance: 1,100

25 September 2018 Friendly	Liberbank Oviedo Baloncesto	108–69	TeslaCard Círculo Gijón	Oviedo
20:00	Scoring by quarter: 32–17, 24–6, 19–21, 33–25
	Pts: Ahonen 21	Boxscore	Pts: Blanco 21	Arena: Pumarín

29 September 2018 Trofeo Principado de Asturias	TeslaCard Círculo Gijón	80–73	Huniko Gijón Basket	Gijón
20:00	Scoring by quarter: 18–23, 23–11, 20–17, 19–22
	Pts: Swift 18	Boxscore	Pts: R. Ejim 27	Arena: Palacio de Deportes; Attendance: 910

== LEB Plata ==
=== First stage ===
==== League table (Group West) ====
Pos	Team	Pld	W	L	PF	PA	PD	Pts	Qualification
7	Bodegas Rioja Vega	22	12	10	1696	1657	+39	34	Qualification to Group A2
8	CB Extremadura Plasencia	22	10	12	1637	1576	+61	32	Qualification to Group A2
9	TeslaCard Círculo Gijón	22	9	13	1640	1637	+3	31	Qualification to Group A2
10	Ávila Auténtica Carrefour "El Bulevar"	22	9	13	1563	1651	−88	31	Qualification to Group A2
11	Grupo Eleyco Baskonia B	22	7	15	1587	1696	−109	29	Qualification to Group A2

Source: FEB

==== Results summary ====
Overall						Home					Away				
Pld	W	L	PF	PA	PD	W	L	PF	PA	PD	W	L	PF	PA	PD
22	9	13	1640	1637	+3	7	4	822	752	+70	2	9	818	885	−67

Source: FEB.es

==== Results by round ====
Round	1	2	3	4	5	6	7	8	9	10	11	12	13	14	15	16	17	18	19	20	21	22
Ground	H	A	H	A	H	A	A	H	A	H	A	A	H	A	H	A	H	H	A	H	A	H
Result	W	L	L	L	L	L	L	W	L	W	L	W	W	L	L	W	W	L	L	W	W	W
Position	4	10	9	12	12	12	12	12	12	10	12	12	12	12	12	11	11	11	11	10	10	9

Source: FEB.es
A = Away; H = Home; W = Win; L = Loss

==== Matches ====
29 September 2018 1	TeslaCard Círculo Gijón	75–67	Ávila Auténtica Carrefour "El Bulevar"	Gijón
20:30	Scoring by quarter: 16–16, 24–11, 21–24, 14–16
	Pts: Moro 19; Rebs: Swift 8 Asts: Moro, Osayande 4 PIR: Moro, Osayande 21	Boxscore	Pts: Faye 14; Rebs: Faye 7 Asts: Cazorla 5 PIR: Faye, García 18	Arena: Palacio de Deportes; Attendance: 780; Referees: Sánchez Benito, Piñeiro Amondaray

11 October 2018 2	Quesería La Antigua CB Tormes	80–64	TeslaCard Círculo Gijón	Salamanca
20:30	Scoring by quarter: 17–25, 23–16, 25–8, 15–15
	Pts: Round 16; Rebs: Moreno 8 Asts: Round 6 PIR: Moreno 19	Boxscore	Pts: Kimbrough 19; Rebs: Osayande 12; Asts: Blanco 6 PIR: Osayande 32	Arena: Würzburg; Referees: Gallego Rodríguez, Del Val Nuño

14 October 2018 3	TeslaCard Círculo Gijón	77–79	Basket Navarra	Gijón
19:00	Scoring by quarter: 34–18, 18–28, 6–17, 19–16
	Pts: Kimbrough 16; Rebs: Swift 9 Asts: Kimbrough 6 PIR: Swift 21	Boxscore	Pts: Hernández-Sonseca 20; Rebs: Hernández-Sonseca 8 Asts: Marzo 4 PIR: Hernández-Sonseca 16	Arena: Palacio de Deportes; Attendance: 1,100; Referees: Pazos Pazos, Martín Vázquez

21 October 2018 4	Juaristi ISB	74–72(OT)	TeslaCard Círculo Gijón	Azpeitia
18:00	Scoring by quarter: 17–14, 8–19, 16–17, 19–10, Overtime: 14–12
	Pts: Powell 26; Rebs: Salazar 17; Asts: Powell 7 PIR: Salazar 24	Boxscore	Pts: Blanco 27; Rebs: Osayande 11; Asts: Osayande 4 PIR: Blanco 21	Arena: Pabellón Municipal; Referees: Murillo Khon, Báez Batista

27 October 2018 5	TeslaCard Círculo Gijón	61–65	Igualatorio Cantabria Estela	Gijón
20:00	Scoring by quarter: 17–16, 15–16, 10–11, 19–22
	Pts: Kimbrough 14; Rebs: Menéndez 8 Asts: Moro 3 PIR: Osayande 16	Boxscore	Pts: Norris, Nadikjim 12; Rebs: Nadikjim 10; Asts: Kearse, Thomas 2 PIR: Kearse 15	Arena: Palacio de Deportes; Attendance: 1,000; Referees: Lema Parga, Piñero Amondaray

3 November 2018 6	Zornotza Saskibaloi Taldea	87–82	TeslaCard Círculo Gijón	Amorebieta-Etxano
18:30	Scoring by quarter: 22–15, 14–24, 28–18, 23–25
	Pts: Mazaira 24; Rebs: Bercy 7 Asts: Nimley 8 PIR: Nimley 29	Boxscore	Pts: Swift 22; Rebs: three players 5 Asts: Blanco 5 PIR: Swift 25	Arena: Larrea; Referees: Munar Bañón, Cortés Payá

10 November 2018 7	Aquimisa Laboratorios Queso Zamorano	94–83	TeslaCard Círculo Gijón	Zamora
17:00	Scoring by quarter: 23–23, 27–24, 22–19, 22–17
	Pts: Libroia 26; Rebs: Iza 9 Asts: three players 3 PIR: Libroia 32	Boxscore	Pts: Kimbrough 25; Rebs: Đorđević 8 Asts: Đorđević 3 PIR: Đorđević 21	Arena: Ángel Nieto; Referees: López Lecuona, Escartí Castañeda

14 November 2018 8	TeslaCard Círculo Gijón	63–59	Bodegas Rioja Vega	Gijón
20:00	Scoring by quarter: 8–22, 19–8, 18–23, 18–6
	Pts: Blanco 24; Rebs: Menéndez, Yengue 10; Asts: Rubiera 2 PIR: Blanco 26	Boxscore	Pts: Niessen 14; Rebs: Niessen 8 Asts: Noguerol 6 PIR: Niessen 17	Arena: Palacio de Deportes; Attendance: 600; Referees: Carpallo Miguélez, González Morán

18 November 2018 9	CB Extremadura Plasencia	86–68	TeslaCard Círculo Gijón	Plasencia
12:00	Scoring by quarter: 21–21, 29–15, 18–17, 18–15
	Pts: Morgan 17; Rebs: Morgan 8 Asts: Medina 8 PIR: Morgan 26	Boxscore	Pts: Blanco 18; Rebs: Blanco 8 Asts: Blanco 7 PIR: Blanco 24	Arena: Ciudad de Plasencia; Referees: Marcos Gómez, Garvín Domingo

24 November 2018 10	TeslaCard Círculo Gijón	87–73	Grupo Eleyco Baskonia B	Gijón
20:00	Scoring by quarter: 27–16, 19–15, 26–19, 15–23
	Pts: Osayande 22; Rebs: Osayande 13; Asts: Blanco 5 PIR: Osayande 34	Boxscore	Pts: González 22; Rebs: González 11; Asts: López 6 PIR: González 27	Arena: Palacio de Deportes; Attendance: 1,200; Referees: García Parejo, Martín Vázquez

1 December 2018 11	Marín Ence Peixe Galego	82–68	TeslaCard Círculo Gijón	Marín
20:00	Scoring by quarter: 18–19, 16–18, 25–20, 23–11
	Pts: Gregory 20; Rebs: Badmus 17; Asts: Gregory, Romero 3 PIR: Badmus 30	Boxscore	Pts: Swift 16; Rebs: Osayande 12; Asts: Yengue 8 PIR: Osayande 15	Arena: A Raña; Referees: Lucas Martínez, Lema Parga

8 December 2018 12	Ávila Auténtica Carrefour "El Bulevar"	77–73	TeslaCard Círculo Gijón	Ávila
19:00	Scoring by quarter: 17–14, 17–20, 22–22, 21–17
	Pts: Lawrence-Ricks 18; Rebs: Faye, Santana 9 Asts: García 6 PIR: Santana 17	Boxscore	Pts: Menéndez 20; Rebs: Menéndez 20; Asts: Kimbrough, Blanco 2 PIR: Menéndez 27	Arena: Carlos Sastre; Referees: Bravo Loroño, Báez Batista

12 December 2018 13	TeslaCard Círculo Gijón	78–66	Quesería La Antigua CB Tormes	Gijón
20:00	Scoring by quarter: 19–16, 23–10, 17–21, 19–19
	Pts: Yengue 23; Rebs: Osayande 10; Asts: Moro 5 PIR: Yengue 27	Boxscore	Pts: Ehigitor 19; Rebs: Rivas 7 Asts: Moreno 4 PIR: Ehigitor 18	Arena: Palacio de Deportes; Attendance: 900; Referees: Carpallo Miguélez, González Cuervo

16 December 2018 14	Basket Navarra	78–70	TeslaCard Círculo Gijón	Pamplona
12:00	Scoring by quarter: 16–22, 23–12, 17–14, 22–22
	Pts: Hernández-Sonseca 11; Rebs: Hernández-Sonseca 7 Asts: three players 3 PIR: Fuentes 18	Boxscore	Pts: Blanco, Đorđević 14; Rebs: Osayande 16; Asts: Kimbrough, Moro 3 PIR: Osayande 19	Arena: Arrosadia; Referees: Alcázar Moreno, Garrido Tornero

30 December 2018 15	TeslaCard Círculo Gijón	57–58	Juaristi ISB	Gijón
19:00	Scoring by quarter: 17–15, 17–4, 13–22, 10–17
	Pts: Blanco 17; Rebs: Menéndez 12; Asts: three players 2 PIR: Menéndez 20	Boxscore	Pts: Beraza 15; Rebs: Beraza 14; Asts: Powell 5 PIR: Beraza 26	Arena: Palacio de Deportes; Attendance: 1,600; Referees: Langa de Martín, Garvín Domingo

5 January 2019 16	Igualatorio Cantabria Estela	62–71	TeslaCard Círculo Gijón	Santander
13:00	Scoring by quarter: 19–18, 17–15, 24–15, 2–23
	Pts: Atewe 13; Rebs: Atewe 15; Asts: Atewe 19; PIR: Menéndez 20	Boxscore	Pts: Swift 16; Rebs: Osayande 12; Asts: Blanco 7 PIR: Blanco 19	Arena: Palacio de Deportes; Referees: Terreros San Miguel, Esteve Malmierca

12 January 2019 17	TeslaCard Círculo Gijón	70–56	Zornotza Saskibaloi Taldea	Gijón
19:30	Scoring by quarter: 29–14, 16–18, 14–9, 11–15
	Pts: Kimbrough 17; Rebs: Osayande 10; Asts: Kimbrough 3 PIR: Kimbrough 17	Boxscore	Pts: Champagnie, Sainz de la Maza 12; Rebs: Champagnie 13; Asts: Onwuasor 3 PIR: Sainz de la Maza 15	Arena: Palacio de Deportes; Attendance: 1,300; Referees: Uruñuela Uruñuela, Del Val Nuño

19 January 2019 18	TeslaCard Círculo Gijón	75–79	Aquimisa Laboratorios Queso Zamorano	Gijón
20:00	Scoring by quarter: 20–17, 15–18, 13–27, 27–17
	Pts: Rubiera 16; Rebs: Osayande 12; Asts: Blanco, Yengue 3 PIR: Osayande 19	Boxscore	Pts: Libroia 23; Rebs: Robinson, Somogyi 6 Asts: four players 3 PIR: Libroia 23	Arena: Palacio de Deportes; Attendance: 1,200; Referees: García Parejo, Gallego Rodríguez

27 January 2019 19	Bodegas Rioja Vega	88–84	TeslaCard Círculo Gijón	Logroño
12:00	Scoring by quarter: 25–19, 24–19, 19–26, 20–20
	Pts: Parrado 26; Rebs: Lafuente 6 Asts: Noguerol 5 PIR: Noguerol 24	Boxscore	Pts: Osayande 17; Rebs: Osayande 12; Asts: Blanco, Osayande 2 PIR: Osayande 30	Arena: Palacio de los Deportes; Referees: Iglesias Ambrosio, Martínez Estopiñán

2 February 2019 20	TeslaCard Círculo Gijón	75–72	CB Plasencia Extremadura	Gijón
20:00	Scoring by quarter: 20–21, 18–15, 19–18, 18–18
	Pts: Blanco 27; Rebs: Osayande 10; Asts: Blanco, Menéndez 3 PIR: Blanco 36	Boxscore	Pts: Gallardo, Medina 18; Rebs: Gallardo, Mayot 6 Asts: Medina 9 PIR: Medina 22	Arena: Palacio de Deportes; Attendance: 1,100; Referees: Pinela García, Piñeiro Amondaray

9 February 2019 21	Igualatorio Cantabria Estela	77–83	TeslaCard Círculo Gijón	Vitoria-Gasteiz
20:00	Scoring by quarter: 25–9, 18–27, 24–25, 10–22
	Pts: Raieste 20; Rebs: Miller 8 Asts: López 6 PIR: Raieste 21	Boxscore	Pts: Kimbrough 20; Rebs: Swift 13; Asts: Blanco 5 PIR: Swift 26	Arena: Mendizorroza; Referees: González Cuervo, Marcos Gómez

16 February 2019 22	TeslaCard Círculo Gijón	104–78	Marín Ence Peixe Galego	Gijón
20:00	Scoring by quarter: 19–18, 28–18, 23–27, 34–15
	Pts: Kimbrough 19; Rebs: Yengue 9 Asts: Yengue 4 PIR: Yengue 29	Boxscore	Pts: Gregory 22; Rebs: Pantín 7 Asts: Orellano 3 PIR: Gregory 19	Arena: Palacio de Deportes; Attendance: 900; Referees: García Parejo, Villanueva Tena

=== Second stage ===
==== League table (Group A2) ====
Pos	Team	Pld	W	L	PF	PA	PD	Pts	Relegation
5	Arcos Albacete Basket	22	13	9	1564	1604	−40	35	
6	Grupo Eleyco Baskonia B	22	13	9	1658	1621	+37	35	
7	TeslaCard Círculo Gijón	22	11	11	1666	1619	+47	33	Relegation to Liga EBA
8	CB Extremadura Plasencia	22	10	12	1565	1513	+52	32	Relegation to Liga EBA
9	Ávila Auténtica Carrefour "El Bulevar"	22	10	12	1591	1601	−10	32	Relegation to Liga EBA

Source: FEB

==== Results summary ====
Overall						Home					Away				
Pld	W	L	PF	PA	PD	W	L	PF	PA	PD	W	L	PF	PA	PD
12	5	7	919	874	+45	3	3	484	420	+64	2	4	435	454	−19

Source: FEB.es

==== Results by round ====
Round	S	1	2	3	4	5	6	7	8	9	10	11	12
Ground	–	H	A	H	A	H	A	A	H	A	H	A	H
Result	–	W	L	L	L	L	L	L	W	W	W	W	L
Position	5	3	5	5	8	8	8	9	9	7	7	7	7

Updated to match(es) played on 23 March 2019. Source: FEB
A = Away; H = Home; W = Win; L = Loss; = Relegation to Liga EBA

==== Matches ====
27 February 2019 1	TeslaCard Círculo Gijón	79–62	Arcos Albacete Basket	Gijón
20:00	Scoring by quarter: 22–21, 15–23, 19–7, 23–11
	Pts: Kimbrough 20; Rebs: Osayande 20; Asts: four players 2 PIR: Osayande 36	Boxscore	Pts: Jukic 17; Rebs: Polanco 10; Asts: Polanco, Sanz 3 PIR: Jukic 11	Arena: Palacio de Deportes; Attendance: 700; Referees: Morales García-Alcaide, Villanueva Tena

2 March 2019 2	Torrons Vicens CB L'Hospitalet	74–63	TeslaCard Círculo Gijón	L'Hospitalet de Llobregat
20:00	Scoring by quarter: 22–25, 17–8, 14–14, 21–16
	Pts: Creus, Diop 13; Rebs: Diop 9 Asts: Diop 4 PIR: García 17	Boxscore	Pts: Kimbrough 19; Rebs: Osayande 11; Asts: Baltus 4 PIR: Kimbrough 12	Arena: Nou Pavelló del Centre; Referees: Lema Parga, Martínez Estopiñán

9 March 2019 3	TeslaCard Círculo Gijón	72–79	CB Vic Universitat de Vic	Gijón
20:00	Scoring by quarter: 15–17, 22–30, 13–12, 22–20
	Pts: Osayande 17; Rebs: Osayande 11; Asts: three players 4 PIR: Osayande 31	Boxscore	Pts: Fornas 24; Rebs: Sabata, Vidal 6 Asts: Garrote 4 PIR: Fornas 26	Arena: Palacio de Deportes; Attendance: 1,500; Referees: Franquesa Vázquez, Del Val Nuño

16 March 2019 4	Jafep Fundación Globalcaja La Roda	88–76	TeslaCard Círculo Gijón	La Roda
19:00	Scoring by quarter: 28–16, 19–23, 14–12, 27–25
	Pts: Adón 27; Rebs: Kougnia 6 Asts: Adón 6 PIR: Adón 34	Boxscore	Pts: Kimbrough 18; Rebs: Osayande 6 Asts: Rubiera 3 PIR: Osayande 21	Arena: Juan José Lozano Jareño; Referees: López Córdoba, Checa Nebot

23 March 2019 5	TeslaCard Círculo Gijón	74–77	Aceitunas Fragata Morón	Gijón
20:00	Scoring by quarter: 20–31, 18–22, 14–13, 22–11
	Pts: Kimbrough 21; Rebs: Osayande 9 Asts: Osayande, Swift 2 PIR: Osayande 22	Boxscore	Pts: Aramburu 20; Rebs: Fall 8 Asts: Marco 5 PIR: Aramburu	Arena: Palacio de Deportes; Attendance: 1,200; Referees: Carpallo Miguélez, Pinela García

30 March 2019 6	Hestia Menorca	92–74	TeslaCard Círculo Gijón	Mahón
20:00	Scoring by quarter: 21–20, 26–17, 28–17, 17–20
	Pts: Matalí 26; Rebs: Matalí 12; Asts: Jiménez 7 PIR: Matalí 31	Boxscore	Pts: Swift 14; Rebs: Prinsloo 11; Asts: Baltus 3 PIR: Swift 19	Arena: Pavelló Menorca; Referees: Langa de Martín, González Zumajo

6 April 2019 7	Arcos Albacete Basket	69–62	TeslaCard Círculo Gijón	Albacete
19:30	Scoring by quarter: 19–16, 15–19, 11–19, 24–8
	Pts: Polanco 15; Rebs: Van 10; Asts: Van 4 PIR: Van 23	Boxscore	Pts: Đorđević 14; Rebs: Osayande 10; Asts: Osayande 4 PIR: Đorđević 20	Arena: Pabellón del Parque; Referees: Lizana Moreno, Báez Batista

14 April 2019 8	TeslaCard Círculo Gijón	86–52	Torrons Vicens CB L'Hospitalet	Gijón
19:00	Scoring by quarter: 18–16, 26–9, 24–18, 18–9
	Pts: Blanco 19; Rebs: Osayande 12; Asts: Rubiera 4 PIR: Osayande 28	Boxscore	Pts: Covington 17; Rebs: Covington, Gelazonia 5 Asts: four players 2 PIR: Covington 11	Arena: Palacio de Deportes; Attendance: 1,100; Referees: López Lecuona, Areste Giralt

21 April 2019 9	CB Vic Universitat de Vic	67–72	TeslaCard Círculo Gijón	Vic
20:00	Scoring by quarter: 10–17, 20–17, 17–13, 20–25
	Pts: Domínguez, Torrent 12; Rebs: Fornas, Sabata 6 Asts: Campell, Torrent 4 PIR: Fornas, Torrent 14	Boxscore	Pts: Blanco 17; Rebs: Prinsloo 8 Asts: Kimbrough 6 PIR: Blanco 16	Arena: Castell d'en Planes; Referees: Uruñuela Uruñuela, Chiva López

25 April 2019 10	TeslaCard Círculo Gijón	98–70	Jafep Fundación Globalcaja La Roda	Gijón
20:00	Scoring by quarter: 30–20, 27–23, 25–12, 16–15
	Pts: Kimbrough 34; Rebs: Prinsloo 10; Asts: three players 4 PIR: Kimbrough 34	Boxscore	Pts: Kougnia 15; Rebs: Kougnia 10; Asts: Herrero, Iroegbu 4 PIR: Kougnia 20	Arena: Palacio de Deportes; Attendance: 800; Referees: Muñoz García, Carrera Rosdevall

4 May 2019 11	Aceitunas Fragata Morón	64–88	TeslaCard Círculo Gijón	Morón de la Frontera
20:00	Scoring by quarter: 14–23, 19–19, 21–23, 10–23
	Pts: Rodríguez 21; Rebs: Fall 8 Asts: Vázquez 7 PIR: Rodríguez 20	Boxscore	Pts: Kimbrough 22; Rebs: Osayande 12; Asts: Kimbrough 6 PIR: Kimbrough 27	Arena: Alameda; Referees: García León, Franquesa Vázquez

11 May 2019 12	TeslaCard Círculo Gijón	72–80	Hestia Menorca	Gijón
20:00	Scoring by quarter: 15–23, 16–21, 26–23, 15–13
	Pts: Blanco 24; Rebs: Osayande, Prinsloo 9 Asts: Kimbrough 4 PIR: Blanco 17	Boxscore	Pts: Pack 20; Rebs: Orfila 7 Asts: three players 3 PIR: Méndez 21	Arena: Palacio de Deportes; Attendance: 1,300; Referees: López Herrada, Marcos Gómez

== Statistics ==
Legend
GP	Games played	GS	Games started	MPG	Minutes per game
FG%	Field-goal percentage	3FG%	3-point field-goal percentage	FT%	Free-throw percentage
RPG	Rebounds per game	APG	Assists per game	SPG	Steals per game
BPG	Blocks per game	PPG	Points per game	PIR	PIR per game

Player	GP	MPG	2FG%	3FG%	FT%	RPG	APG	SPG	BPG	PPG	PIR
Davy Baltus	10	19.4	.471	.176	.667	1.8	1.8	0.6	0.1	4.5	1.3
Saúl Blanco	28	32.5	.500	.389	.788	4.1	2.9	1.3	0.2	15.3	16.6
David de la Vega	1	1.2	.000	.000	.000	0.0	1.0	0.0	0.0	0.0	1.0
Nemanja Đorđević	31	15.9	.536	.375	.774	3.6	0.6	0.5	0.3	7.1	7.9
Junior Johnson	4	0.5	.143	.000	.000	1.5	0.3	0.8	0.0	0.5	–1.0
Martyce Kimbrough	34	31.0	.435	.376	.688	3.1	2.2	1.1	0.1	14.2	10.7
Javier Menéndez	28	19.2	.406	.348	.590	5.5	0.5	0.5	0.6	6.3	7.2
Ángel Moro	12	23.7	.545	.323	.526	1.7	2.3	0.8	0.1	6.3	4.7
Shane Osayande	31	27.6	.468	.353	.808	9.4	1.5	0.8	1.8	12.4	18.4
Pieter Prinsloo	20	24.7	.434	.316	.667	5.9	1.1	0.4	0.7	8.4	8.8
Alejandro Rubiera	34	15.3	.327	.307	.697	1.7	0.8	0.3	0.0	4.3	2.1
Rubén Suárez	13	5.4	.500	.000	.000	0.2	0.3	0.5	0.0	0.2	0.1
Robert Swift	33	22.8	.502	.286	.738	4.8	0.8	0.3	1.0	8.1	9.1
Ignacio Uccello	5	1.6	.000	.000	.000	0.4	0.0	0.0	0.0	0.0	0.0
Nelson Yengue	28	22.1	.496	.231	.653	3.5	1.6	0.7	0.1	5.7	6.4

Source: FEB.es
