= Oriol Paulí =

Spanish basketball player

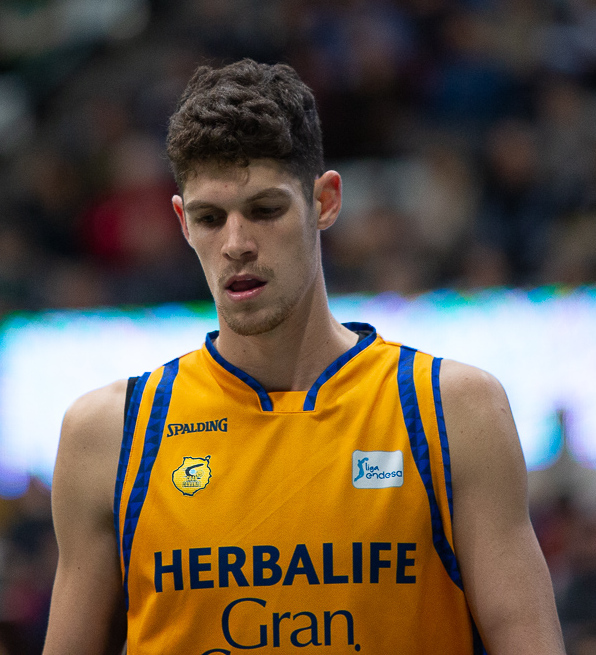
- Paulí in 2019

No. 5 – Força Lleida
- Position: Small forward
- League: Liga ACB

Personal information
- Born: May 20, 1994 (age 32) Girona, Spain
- Listed height: 6 ft 7 in (2.01 m)
- Listed weight: 185 lb (84 kg)

Career information
- NBA draft: 2015: undrafted
- Playing career: 2012–present

Career history
- 2012–2014: FC Barcelona B
- 2014–2020: Gran Canaria
- 2020–2022: Andorra
- 2022–2024: FC Barcelona
- 2024–present: Força Lleida

Career highlights
- Spanish Supercup winner (2016); Liga ACB champion (2023)
Medals
Men's basketball
Representing Spain
FIBA Europe Under-20 Championship
| Silver medal – second place | 2014 Crete | Spain |

Oriol Paulí Fornells (born May 20, 1994) is a Spanish professional basketball player who plays for Força Lleida of the Spanish Liga ACB. The small forward was known as one of the top international prospects for the 2015 NBA draft, but went undrafted.

== Early life and youth career ==
Born in Girona, Catalonia, Paulí started playing basketball for local clubs Maristes and Vedruna. He joined the youth ranks of FC Barcelona in 2006. He played through all the junior categories until reaching Barcelona's reserve team, FC Barcelona B.

== Professional career ==
Paulí played for FC Barcelona B in the LEB Oro for two seasons, 2012-13 and 2013-14.

On 2014, Paulí signed a four-year contract with Herbalife Gran Canaria. He debuted in Liga ACB, the top Spanish league, and played the 2015 Eurocup Finals. He also won the 2016 Spanish Supercup with the Canarians.

On July 13, 2020, he signed a three-year deal with Andorra of the Liga ACB.

He would return to FC Barcelona in August 2022, signing a 2 year contract with the Catalans. In his second spell at Barcelona, Paulí played 76 games and helped the team win the 2022-23 Liga ACB. Paulí's time at Barcelona ended as his contract expired in June 2024.

Paulí signed a 2 year contract with Força Lleida CE of the Liga ACB in July 2024. He became one of the key players in the team's roster, averaging 10.1 points per game and helping Lleida avoid relegation in the 2024-25 ACB season.

== National team career ==
Paulí played for several junior teams of the Spanish Basketball Federation, including the under-20 team.

He made his debut with the senior Spanish national team in 2017.

== Career statistics ==
Legend
| GP | Games played | GS | Games started | MPG | Minutes per game |
| FG% | Field-goal percentage | 3P% | 3-point field-goal percentage | FT% | Free-throw percentage |
| RPG | Rebounds per game | APG | Assists per game | SPG | Steals per game |
| BPG | Blocks per game | PPG | Points per game | PIR | Performance index rating |
| **Bold** | Career high |

=== EuroLeague ===
| Year | Team | GP | GS | MPG | FG% | 3P% | FT% | RPG | APG | SPG | BPG | PPG | PIR |
|---|---|---|---|---|---|---|---|---|---|---|---|---|---|
| 2018–19 | Gran Canaria | **29** | **3** | **14.0** | .449 | **.143** | .627 | **2.2** | **1.4** | **.3** | **.2** | **5.2** | **5.5** |
| 2022–23 | Barcelona | 12 | 0 | 3.9 | .375 | .000 | — | .8 | .2 | .1 | — | 0.5 | 0.3 |
| 2023–24 | Barcelona | 14 | 0 | 6.6 | **.452** | .125 | **.750** | 1.1 | .5 | .1 | .1 | 2.4 | 2.0 |
| Career | | 55 | 3 | 10.0 | .446 | .129 | .636 | 1.7 | .9 | .2 | .1 | 3.5 | 3.5 |

=== EuroCup ===
| Year | Team | GP | GS | MPG | FG% | 3P% | FT% | RPG | APG | SPG | BPG | PPG | PIR |
|---|---|---|---|---|---|---|---|---|---|---|---|---|---|
| 2014–15 | Gran Canaria | **22** | 0 | 10.4 | .470 | .364 | .556 | 1.4 | .7 | .2 | .0 | 3.9 | 3.7 |
| 2015–16 | Gran Canaria | 16 | 1 | 11.4 | .419 | .333 | .421 | 2.1 | 1.3 | .3 | .2 | 3.1 | 3.6 |
| 2016–17 | Gran Canaria | 12 | 4 | 10.2 | **.595** | **.429** | .750 | 2.3 | 1.3 | .4 | — | 4.7 | 6.8 |
| 2017–18 | Gran Canaria | 13 | 7 | 18.8 | .520 | .130 | **.850** | 2.6 | 2.4 | .6 | **.4** | 7.5 | 9.3 |
| 2020–21 | Andorra | 16 | 11 | 22.3 | .407 | .258 | .767 | 4.8 | 2.2 | **1.3** | .3 | 6.7 | 9.5 |
| 2021–22 | Andorra | 21 | **12** | **22.4** | .571 | .324 | .733 | **4.8** | **2.6** | .7 | .0 | **8.2** | **12.1** |
| Career | | 100 | 35 | 16.1 | .501 | .289 | .690 | 3.0 | 1.7 | .6 | .2 | 5.7 | 7.5 |

=== Domestic leagues ===
| Year | Team | League | GP | MPG | FG% | 3P% | FT% | RPG | APG | SPG | BPG | PPG |
|---|---|---|---|---|---|---|---|---|---|---|---|---|
| 2011–12 | (Spain) Barcelona B | LEB Plata | 3 | 7.4 | .333 | .000 | .600 | 1.3 | 1.3 | .3 | — | 1.7 |
| 2012–13 | (Spain) Barcelona B | LEB Oro | 26 | 17.8 | .466 | .282 | .781 | 2.8 | .6 | .8 | .0 | 5.1 |
| 2013–14 | (Spain) Barcelona B | LEB Oro | 22 | 24.0 | .403 | .266 | .610 | 4.6 | 1.0 | 1.0 | — | 9.8 |
| 2014–15 | (Spain) Gran Canaria | ACB | 32 | 8.7 | .423 | .292 | .517 | 1.1 | .6 | .5 | — | 2.6 |
| 2015–16 | (Spain) Gran Canaria | ACB | 27 | 10.5 | .356 | .172 | .552 | 1.8 | .8 | .4 | .1 | 2.7 |
| 2016–17 | (Spain) Gran Canaria | ACB | 24 | 8.8 | .404 | .133 | .708 | 1.2 | .7 | .3 | .0 | 2.4 |
| 2017–18 | (Spain) Gran Canaria | ACB | 30 | 16.5 | .479 | .286 | .673 | 2.7 | 1.5 | .4 | .1 | 5.2 |
| 2018–19 | (Spain) Gran Canaria | ACB | 34 | 14.4 | .465 | .208 | .622 | 2.2 | 1.1 | .4 | .1 | 5.3 |
| 2019–20 | (Spain) Gran Canaria | ACB | 22 | 12.3 | .493 | .273 | .767 | 1.5 | .8 | .2 | .0 | 4.4 |
| 2020–21 | (Spain) Andorra | ACB | 35 | 21.9 | .434 | .244 | .794 | 3.4 | 2.1 | .6 | .2 | 7.5 |
| 2021–22 | (Spain) Andorra | ACB | 34 | 22.2 | .409 | .218 | .721 | 3.6 | 2.0 | .8 | .3 | 6.4 |
| 2022–23 | (Spain) Barcelona | ACB | 28 | 11.6 | .415 | .321 | .600 | 2.6 | 1.1 | .5 | — | 3.2 |
| 2023–24 | (Spain) Barcelona | ACB | 17 | 11.4 | .549 | .387 | .667 | 1.7 | 1.3 | .3 | .1 | 4.3 |
