= Eurocup 2014–15 Regular Season Group J =

Standings and Results for Group J of the Last 32 phase of the 2014–15 Eurocup basketball tournament.

== Standings ==
Pos	Team	Pld	W	L	PF	PA	PD	KHI	CTU	LIM	PBC
1	(Russia) Khimki	6	5	1	512	449	+63		75–62	79–70	102–68
2	(Italy) Foxtown Cantù	6	3	3	454	449	+5	99–88		68–57	78–70
3	(France) Limoges	6	3	3	430	430	0	72–86	81–70		71–59
4	(Greece) PAOK	6	1	5	421	489	−68	78–82	78–77	68–79	

Source: Euroleague Basketball;
