= Tomás Bellas =

Spanish basketball player

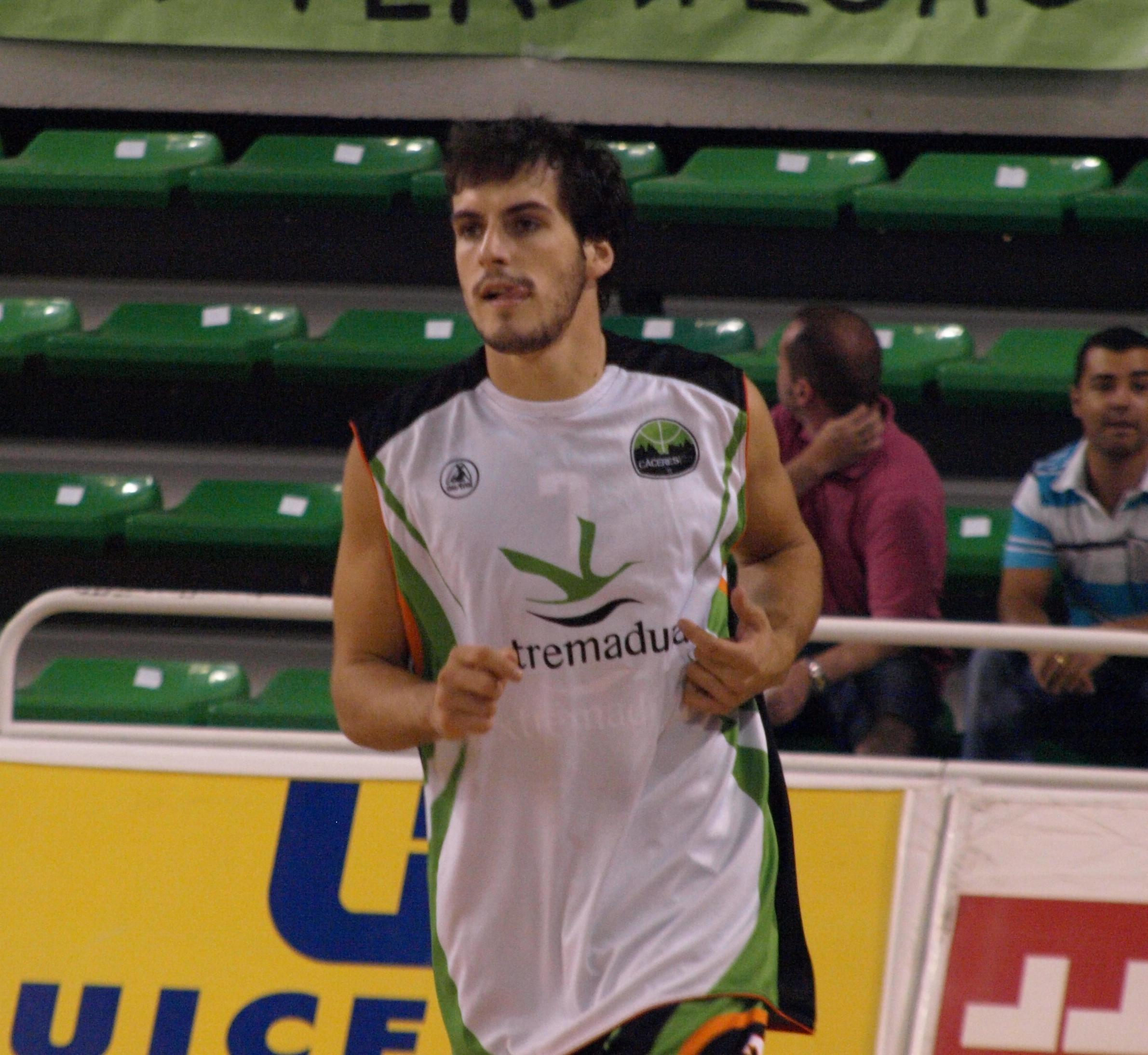

No. 7 – Flexicar Fuenlabrada
- Position: Point guard
- League: Primera FEB

Personal information
- Born: June 24, 1987 (age 37); Madrid, Spain
- Listed height: 1.85 m (6 ft 1 in)
- Listed weight: 90 kg (198 lb)

Career information
- NBA draft: 2009: undrafted
- Playing career: 2005–present

Career history
- 2005–2006: Torrelodones
- 2006–2008: Real Madrid B
- 2008–2009: Cáceres
- 2009–2015: Gran Canaria
- 2015–2018: Zaragoza
- 2018–2020: Fuenlabrada
- 2020–2023: Murcia
- 2023–present: Fuenlabrada

Tomás Bellas García (born 24 June 1987) is a Spanish professional basketball player for Fuenlabrada of the Primera FEB as a point guard.

== Career ==
After playing his first professional years at LEB Bronce with Real Madrid B and Cáceres 2016, in Summer 2009 he surprisingly rescinded his contract with Cáceres for moving to Gran Canaria 2014. After complaining Cáceres this decision, Bellas was condemned to indemnify the Extremenian team with €9,400.

Bellas played in Gran Canaria during six seasons, reaching the 2015 Eurocup Finals. In Summer 2015, Bellas was invited by Atlanta Hawks to play the 2015 NBA Summer League. He later signed a three-year contract with CAI Zaragoza. On August 6, 2018, he signed a contract with Montakit Fuenlabrada Bellas signed with UCAM Murcia on October 28, 2020. He averaged 7 points and 2.8 assists per game. On June 30, 2021, Bellas re-signed with the club.
