= Eurocup 2014–15 Regular Season Group H =

Standings and Results for Group H of the Last 32 phase of the 2014–15 Eurocup basketball tournament.

== Standings ==
Pos	Team	Pld	W	L	PF	PA	PD	HGC	BAN	DSS	POD
1	(Spain) Herbalife Gran Canaria	6	5	1	522	462	+60		91–80	90–74	92–69
2	(Turkey) Banvit	6	4	2	484	450	+34	80–70		74–75	87–74
3	(Italy) Dinamo Sassari	6	2	4	470	507	−37	76–91	72–89		87–70
4	(Montenegro) Budućnost VOLI	6	1	5	457	514	−57	83–88	68–74	93–86	

Source: Euroleague Basketball;
