= Eurocup 2014–15 Regular Season Group D =

Standings and results for Group D of the Regular Season phase of the 2014–15 Eurocup basketball tournament.

== Standings ==
Pos	Team	Pld	W	L	PF	PA	PD
1	(Russia) Khimki	10	8	2	872	756	+116
2	(Turkey) Beşiktaş Integral Forex	10	7	3	773	705	+68
3	(Slovenia) Union Olimpija	10	6	4	800	782	+18
4	(Russia) Zenit	10	5	5	808	809	−1
5	(Hungary) Szolnoki Olaj	10	3	7	748	822	−74
6	(Latvia) VEF Rīga	10	1	9	705	832	−127

Source: Euroleague Basketball

== Fixtures and results ==
=== Game 1 ===
15 October 2014

Khimki (Russia)	94–65	(Latvia) VEF Rīga

15 October 2014

Beşiktaş Integral Forex (Turkey)	68–70	(Slovenia) Union Olimpija

15 October 2014

Szolnoki Olaj (Hungary)	96–94	(Russia) Zenit

=== Game 2 ===
22 October 2014

Zenit (Russia)	86–90	(Turkey) Beşiktaş Integral Forex

22 October 2014

Union Olimpija (Slovenia)	85–88	(Russia) Khimki

22 October 2014

VEF Rīga (Latvia)	71–61	(Hungary) Szolnoki Olaj

=== Game 3 ===
29 October 2014

Zenit (Russia)	84–70	(Latvia) VEF Rīga

29 October 2014

Beşiktaş Integral Forex (Turkey)	66–64	(Russia) Khimki

29 October 2014

Szolnoki Olaj (Hungary)	80–86	(Slovenia) Union Olimpija

=== Game 4 ===
4 November 2014

Union Olimpija (Slovenia)	89–84	(Russia) Zenit

5 November 2014

Khimki (Russia)	98–84	(Hungary) Szolnoki Olaj

5 November 2014

Beşiktaş Integral Forex (Turkey)	88–71	(Latvia) VEF Rīga

=== Game 5 ===
11 November 2014

VEF Rīga (Latvia)	74–83	(Slovenia) Union Olimpija

11 November 2014

Szolnoki Olaj (Hungary)	70–73	(Turkey) Beşiktaş Integral Forex

12 November 2014

Zenit (Russia)	89–86	(Russia) Khimki

=== Game 6 ===
19 November 2014

Zenit (Russia)	81–61	(Hungary) Szolnoki Olaj

19 November 2014

VEF Rīga (Latvia)	79–86	(Russia) Khimki

19 November 2014

Union Olimpija (Slovenia)	57–80	(Turkey) Beşiktaş Integral Forex

=== Game 7 ===
26 November 2014

Khimki (Russia)	105–77	(Slovenia) Union Olimpija

26 November 2014

Beşiktaş Integral Forex (Turkey)	87–73	(Russia) Zenit

26 November 2014

Szolnoki Olaj (Hungary)	96–84	(Latvia) VEF Rīga

=== Game 8 ===
3 December 2014

Khimki (Russia)	82–78	(Turkey) Beşiktaş Integral Forex

3 December 2014

VEF Rīga (Latvia)	66–74	(Russia) Zenit

3 December 2014

Union Olimpija (Slovenia)	89–67	(Hungary) Szolnoki Olaj

=== Game 9 ===
9 December 2014

VEF Rīga (Latvia)	64–76	(Turkey) Beşiktaş Integral Forex

10 December 2014

Szolnoki Olaj (Hungary)	65–79	(Russia) Khimki

10 December 2014

Zenit (Russia)	75–74	(Slovenia) Union Olimpija

=== Game 10 ===
17 December 2014

Khimki (Russia)	90–68	(Russia) Zenit

17 December 2014

Beşiktaş Integral Forex (Turkey)	67–68	(Hungary) Szolnoki Olaj

17 December 2014

Union Olimpija (Slovenia)	90–61	(Latvia) VEF Rīga
