= Círculo Gijón =

- 2019–20 Círculo Gijón season
- Nickname: Los Geométricos (The Geometrics)
- League: LEB Plata
- Founded: 2017
- Arena: Palacio de Deportes
- Capacity: 5,197
- Location: Gijón, Spain
- Team colors: Black, red and white
- President: Carlos Rodellar
- Head coach: Nacho Galán
- Website: circulogijon.es
| Home | Away |

Círculo Gijón Baloncesto y Conocimiento (transl. Gijón Basketball and Knowledge Circle) is a professional basketball club based in Gijón, Asturias that currently plays in LEB Plata, the third tier of Spanish basketball.

== History ==
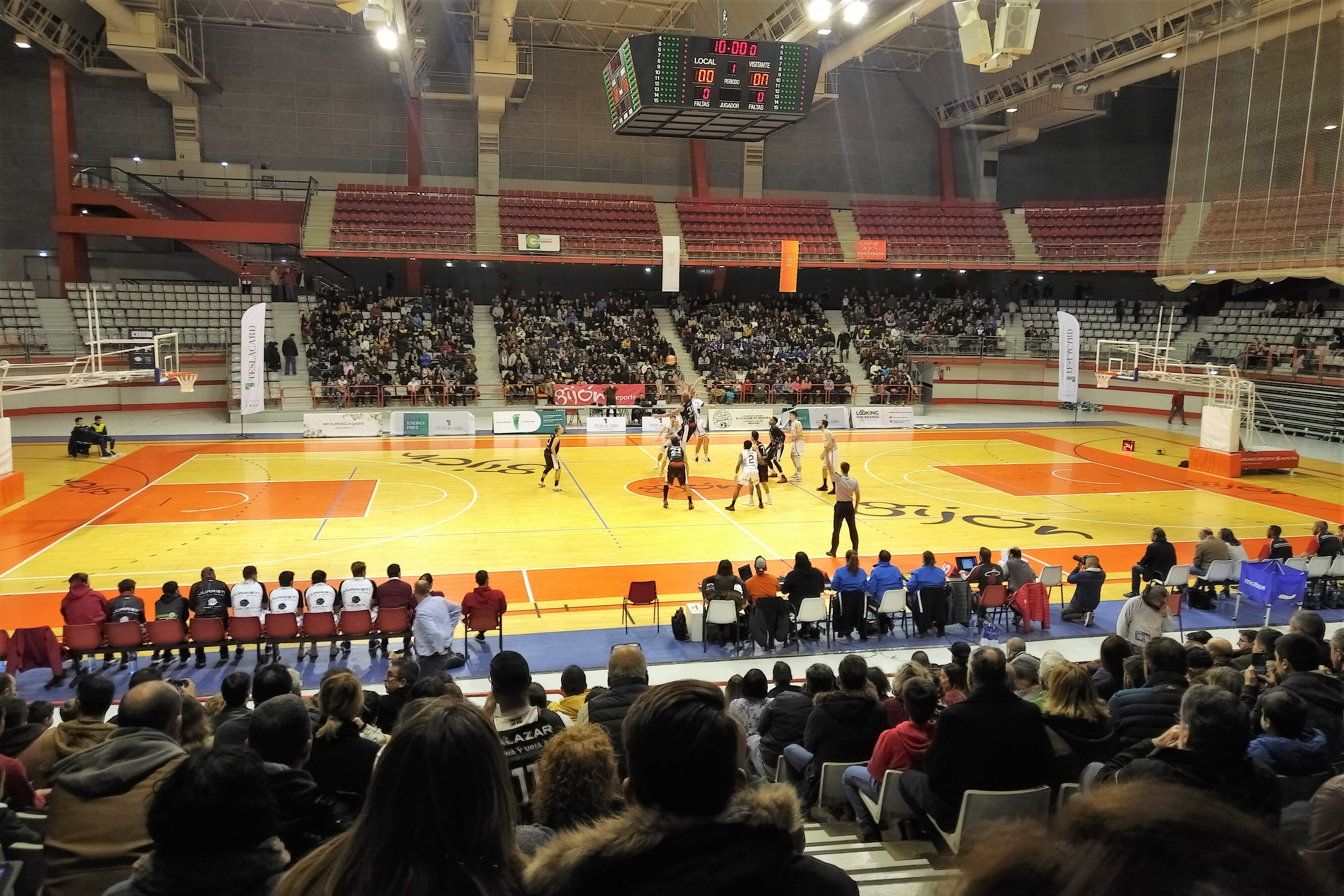
Match against Iraurgi SB in the 2018–19 LEB Plata season.

Círculo Gijón Baloncesto y Conocimiento was founded in 2017, by a group of entrepreneurs that acquired the rights of local club CD Barrio La Arena, with the aim of giving to the city of Gijón a completely professional basketball team with possibilities to promote to the top leagues, as did the former main team Gijón Baloncesto, that played in Liga ACB during four seasons.

The club started in the Primera División, fifth tier, and played its first official game on 19 October 2017 in Avilés, beating Colegio San Fernando by 65–72. On 12 February 2018, Círculo Gijón signed former NBA player Robert Swift for two seasons.

However, Círculo Gijón did not achieve promotion to Liga EBA after being defeated in the league semifinals by the reserve team of Oviedo CB. Despite this failure, the club required and finally achieved one of the eight places that would be created after the expansion of the LEB Plata, third division, to 24 teams.

On 6 October 2018, the club made its debut in professional leagues with a 73–65 home win against Óbila CB. However, Círculo Gijón could not avoid relegation to Liga EBA at the end of the season, after an irregular performance.

Círculo Gijón remained in the league as a result of a swap of places with Baskonia B, that finished one position over the geometrics.

== Sponsorship naming ==
- TeslaCard Círculo Gijón 2018–2019

== Kit manufacturers and shirt sponsors ==
| Period | Kit manufacturer | Shirt sponsors |
|---|---|---|
| 2017–2018 | Spalding | None |
| 2018–2019 | Pentex | TeslaCard |
| 2019–present | Legea | None |

== Head coaches ==
- Nacho Galán 2017–present

== Season by season ==
| Season | Tier | Division | Pos. | W–L | Roster |
|---|---|---|---|---|---|
| 2017–18 | 5 | 1ª División | 3rd (Note: Achieved one of the vacant places after the expansion of the LEB Plata.) | 20–4 | Antonio Austin, Cristian de los Santos, Junior Johnson, Mike Kuethe, Adriano Pérez, Stevan Radojković, Rubén Suárez, Robert Swift, Jovan Vukašinović. Coach: Nacho Galán. |
| 2018–19 | 3 | LEB Plata | 19th (Note: Remained in the league after swapping its place with Baskonia B.) | 14–20 | Davy Baltus, Saúl Blanco, Nemanja Đorđević, Junior Johnson, Martyce Kimbrough, Javier Menéndez, Ángel Moro, Shane Osayande, Pieter Prinsloo, Alejandro Rubiera, Rubén Suárez, Robert Swift, Nelson Yengue. Coach: Nacho Galán. |
| 2019–20 | 3 | LEB Plata | 23rd (Note: Season curtailed due to the COVID-19 pandemic.) | 8–17 | Gregorio Adón, Mike Amius, Nolan Ebel, Henrik Jädersten, Edu Lada, Jaime Llano, Javi Menéndez, Ángel Moro, Joaquín Portugués, Carlos Poyatos, Jamal Reynolds, Robert Swift, Rob Ukawuba. Coach: Nacho Galán. |

== Trophies and awards ==
=== Trophies ===
Friendly tournaments

- Trofeo Virgen de Valencia: 2018
- Trofeo Concello de Chantada: 2018
- Trofeo Principado de Asturias: 2018

=== Individual awards ===
All LEB Plata team

- Saúl Blanco – 2019

== Notable players ==
Note: Flags indicate national team eligibility at FIBA-sanctioned events. Players may hold other non-FIBA nationalities not displayed.

Criteria

To appear in this section a player must have either:

- Set a club record or won an individual award while at the club
- Played at least one official international match for their national team at any time
- Played at least one official NBA match at any time.

- (Spain) Saúl Blanco
- (South Africa) Pieter Prinsloo
- (United States) Robert Swift
