= Eurocup 2014–15 Regular Season Group B =

Standings and results for Group B of the Regular Season phase of the 2014–15 Eurocup basketball tournament.

== Standings ==
Pos	Team	Pld	W	L	GF	GA	GD
1	(Spain) Herbalife Gran Canaria	10	10	0	837	704	+133
2	(Belgium) Telenet Oostende	10	6 (Note: Head-to-head: 1-1 (0))	4	768	766	+2
3	(France) Dijon	10	6 (Note: Head-to-head: 1-1 (0))	4	710	739	−29
4	(Italy) Foxtown Cantù	10	4	6	738	752	−14
5	(France) ASVEL	10	3	7	744	791	−47
6	(Germany) Artland Dragons	10	1	9	725	770	−45

Source: Euroleague Basketball

== Fixtures and results ==
=== Game 1 ===
14 October 2014

Herbalife Gran Canaria (Spain)	101–81	(Italy) Pallacanestro Cantù

14 October 2014

Artland Dragons (Germany)	64–70	(France) Asvel Lyon Metropole

15 October 2014

Dijon (France)	72–63	(Belgium) Telenet Oostende

=== Game 2 ===
22 October 2014

Pallacanestro Cantù (Italy)	77–78	(Germany) Artland Dragons

22 October 2014

Telenet Oostende (Belgium)	76–83	(Spain) Herbalife Gran Canaria

22 October 2014

Asvel Lyon Metropole (France)	77–78	(France) Dijon

=== Game 3 ===
29 October 2014

Artland Dragons (Germany)	67–75	(Belgium) Telenet Oostende

29 October 2014

Asvel Lyon Metropole (France)	78–70	(Italy) Pallacanestro Cantù

29 October 2014

Dijon (France)	69–71	(Spain) Herbalife Gran Canaria

=== Game 4 ===
5 November 2014

Telenet Oostende (Belgium)	99–97	(France) Asvel Lyon Metropole

5 November 2014

Dijon (France)	75–66	(Italy) Pallacanestro Cantù

5 November 2014

Herbalife Gran Canaria (Spain)	74–63	(Germany) Artland Dragons

=== Game 5 ===
11 November 2014

Asvel Lyon Metropole (France)	75–92	(Spain) Herbalife Gran Canaria

12 November 2014

Artland Dragons (Germany)	76–79	(France) Dijon

12 November 2014

Pallacanestro Cantù (Italy)	68–60	(Belgium) Telenet Oostende

=== Game 6 ===
19 November 2014

Pallacanestro Cantù (Italy)	63–80	(Spain) Herbalife Gran Canaria

19 November 2014

Asvel Lyon Metropole (France)	84–83	(Germany) Artland Dragons

19 November 2014

Telenet Oostende (Belgium)	80–71	(France) Dijon

=== Game 7 ===
25 November 2014

Artland Dragons (Germany)	66–68	(Italy) Pallacanestro Cantù

26 November 2014

Dijon (France)	75–58	(France) Asvel Lyon Metropole

26 November 2014

Herbalife Gran Canaria (Spain)	79–70	(Belgium) Telenet Oostende

=== Game 8 ===
3 December 2014

Pallacanestro Cantù (Italy)	79–69	(France) Asvel Lyon Metropole

3 December 2014

Telenet Oostende (Belgium)	84–82	(Germany) Artland Dragons

3 December 2014

Herbalife Gran Canaria (Spain)	94–60	(France) Dijon

=== Game 9 ===
10 December 2014

Artland Dragons (Germany)	81–90	(Spain) Herbalife Gran Canaria

10 December 2014

Asvel Lyon Metropole (France)	70–78	(Belgium) Telenet Oostende

10 December 2014

Pallacanestro Cantù (Italy)	89–63	(France) Dijon

=== Game 10 ===
17 December 2014

Dijon (France)	69–65	(Germany) Artland Dragons

17 December 2014

Telenet Oostende (Belgium)	83–77	(Italy) Pallacanestro Cantù

17 December 2014

Herbalife Gran Canaria (Spain)	73–66	(France) Asvel Lyon Metropole
