= Asturias autonomous basketball team =

Asturias
- National federation: Basketball Federation of the Principality of Asturias
- Coach: Joaquín Prado; Arturo Álvarez
Home

First international
- Asturias 55–69 Ivory Coast (Luanco, Spain; 28 July 2009)

The Asturias autonomous basketball team is the basketball team of Asturias, Spain. The team is not affiliated to FIBA, so only plays friendly games.

== History ==
Asturias only played one friendly game in its history. It was on 2009 at Luanco and it was defeated by Côte d'Ivoire. ACB player Saúl Blanco only could play one minute for avoiding him a possible injury due to his call up to the Spain national basketball team.

== Roster ==
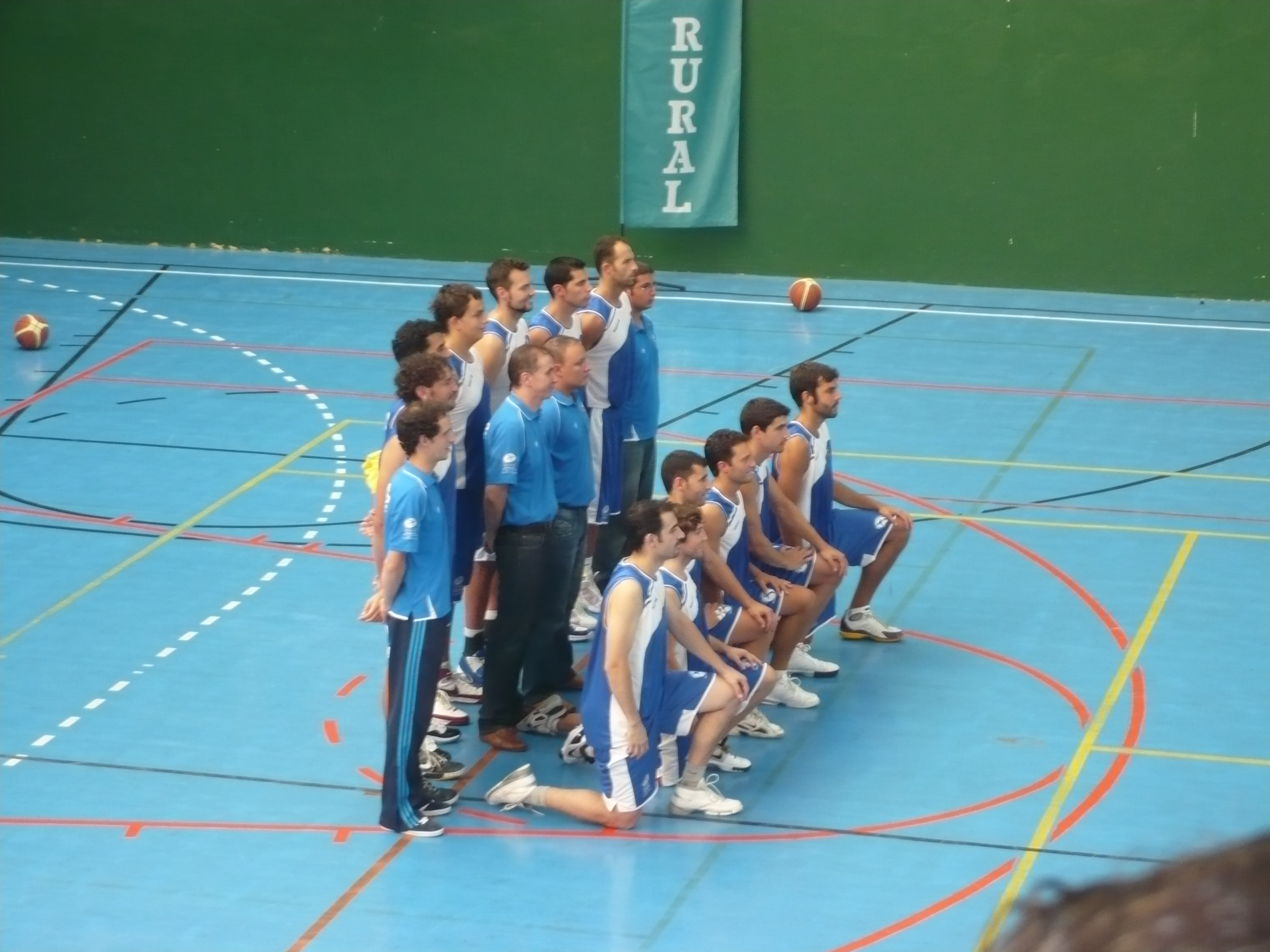
Asturias basketball team.

This was the roster of the Asturias team for the 2009 game.

Asturias Basketball Team roster
Players
Coaches

Pos.	No.	Name	Age – Date of birth	Height	Club	Ctr.
C		Armando Álvarez	–		CB Ciutadella	(Spain)
SF		Saúl Blanco	24 – 15 May 1985	1.94 m (6 ft 4 in)	Baloncesto Fuenlabrada	(Spain)
C		Orlando Camín	30 – 18 December 1978	2.05 m (6 ft 9 in)	CB Granada	(Spain)
PF		Dani González	24 – 26 October 1984	2.05 m (6 ft 9 in)	Gijón Baloncesto	(Asturias)
SF		Adrián Macía	33 – 2 July 1976	1.96 m (6 ft 5 in)	Oviedo CB	(Asturias)
PF		Héctor Macía	31 – 24 September 1977	1.97 m (6 ft 6 in)	Oviedo CB	(Asturias)
PG		David Pérez	25 – 1 September 1983		Côte d'Azur Basket	(France)
SF		Hugo Rodríguez	33 – 29 February 1976		CB Santa Pola	(Spain)
PF		Javier Rodríguez	–		Oviedo CB	(Asturias)
PF		Diego Sánchez	33 – 26 December 1975	1.98 m (6 ft 6 in)	Bàsquet Manresa	(Spain)
C		Manu Sánchez	28 – 11 May 1981	2.04 m (6 ft 8 in)	CB Chantada	(Spain)
PG		Rubén Suárez	31 – 14 January 1978	1.87 m (6 ft 2 in)	Gijón Baloncesto	(Asturias)

Head coach

- (Asturias) Joaquín Prado
- (Asturias) Arturo Álvarez

Legend

- (C) Team captain
- Club field describes pro club
  during the 2008–09 season

== Games played ==
28 July 2009	Asturias	55–69	Ivory Coast	Luanco
20:00	Scoring by quarter: 7–20, 12–21, 20–16, 16–12
	Pts: J. Rodríguez 12	Report	Pts: Koné, N'Diaye 10	Arena: Polideportivo Jenaro Fernández Diego; Attendance: 700; Referees: González Díaz, Martínez Prada
