= Diego Gallardo =

Ecuadorian musical artist (1992–2024)

Background information
- Born: Diego Gallardo Molina; 1992; Guayaquil, Ecuador
- Died: 9 January 2024 (aged 31) Guayaquil, Ecuador
- Occupations: Singer-songwriter; civil engineer
- Instruments: Vocals; Guitar
- Years active: 2016–2024
- Spouse: Camille Gamarra (m. 2021)
- Children: 2

Diego Gallardo Molina (1992 – 9 January 2024) was an Ecuadorian singer-songwriter, musician, cultural manager and civil engineer, also known professionally as Aire del Golfo.

== Early life ==
Diego Gallardo Molina was born in 1992, in Guayaquil, Ecuador. At the age of 10 he began to develop his taste for music, being part of the school's Christmas choir, with which he toured in different shopping centers. At the age of 12, he received a guitar as a gift from his parents, which prompted him to become interested in making music, taking two guitar classes that he abandoned to train as a self-taught person, and after recording covers in English, and in 2007, he decided to write songs in Spanish.

== Career ==
Gallardo began his musical career in 2016 with a style of folklore that mixed styles of traditional Ecuadorian and contemporary music. He used to call his mix of styles his own genre called Tripipop, in addition to various genres such as reggae, blues, rock and acoustics. In 2018 he released his song Mujer Pitahaya, as a preview of his album. He was also a cultural manager and promoted the careers of several artists with lyrics and productions. He began writing his first songs at the age of 15, inspired in personal romantic stories and those of his friends. In 2019, he debuted under the stage name Aire del Golfo, a musical project created with his friend José Ayala, with which he paid constant tributes to the city of Guayaquil, and released his album Dejar zumbar 1. Among his most played songs from the album on Spotify are Otro ocupa mi lugar, Hoy Tengo Ganas de Ti (version by Spanish singer Miguel Gallardo), Canción de amor, Sin Embargo and Pirámide.

In 2021, Gallardo debuted at the Festival Otra Música in Teatro Sánchez Aguilar, along with singers Chloé Silva and Abbacook. That same year, he performed the musical theme Salinas, composed by Jaime del Hierro and produced by Pechiche Mena, a tribute to the coastal city of Salinas, to the rhythm of a slow reggae, with Pechiche Mena on guitar, Kevin Klein on bass, Julián Piterman on drums, Damián Carballal on percussion, Pablo Cherrez on trumpet and Fernando Cherrez on saxophone. Para the cover of the single Salinas, the drawing was created by artist Jorge Velarde. In 2022 he released two singles called Química and ¡Ay, qué calor!, from his second album Dejar zumbar 2, under the La Sociedad Real label. In 2023, he released his final single with Santi Beats, with the song Lila sessions n.º 4: Aire del Golfo, with a new mix of sounds.

== Personal life ==
Gallardo met plastic artist Camille Gamarra at a beer festival in 2018, whom he married in 2021, forming a family with two children: one from Camille's previous engagement who was two years old when he met her, and the other his own son, Diego, with Camille. He dedicated himself full time to his profession as a civil engineer, since he stated that in Ecuador it was not profitable to dedicate himself only to music.

=== Death ===
Gallardo was killed on 9 January 2024, at the age of 31, during the 2024 Ecuadorian conflict, when he was hit by a stray bullet on Avenida del Bombero, in the Ceibos sector, of the city of Guayaquil, by criminals who were terrorizing the city, when he was looking for his son to school to protect him at home due to the conflict. President of the Professional Football League of Ecuador, Miguel Ángel Loor, confirmed the death of the artist on social networks, and gave his condolences to his family. The singer and cousin of the artist, Viviana, expressed her pain and helplessness over his death. Gamarra expressed her pain at the loss of her husband, and stated: "You died like a hero going to protect our son." She also stated that although her seven-year-old son was not his blood son, he loved him as if he were his own and he is the most affected because she said that first his first father left him and now his second father also left him.

Several artists and personalities expressed their condolences to Gallardo's relatives and dedicated a few words to him, such as Ricardo Montaner, Ana Belén, Camila Pérez, the singer and guitarist of the rock band Naranja Lázaro, Juan Carlos Coronel, the singer and cousin of his wife, Chloé Silva Fougères, singer-songwriter Sergio Vivar, the group La Iguana Invisible, the Teatro Sánchez Aguilar, actor Carlos Scavone, and musician Lucas Napolitano, son of the musician and guitarist, Héctor Napolitano. President of the National Assembly, Henry Kronfle, posthumously decorated Gallardo as a National Hero, for risking his life to seek to save that of his 7-year-old foster son.

== Discography ==
=== Albums and singles ===
- Dejar zumbar 1
  - Mujer Pitahaya
  - Otro ocupa mi lugar
  - Hoy tengo ganas de ti
  - Canción de amor
  - Sin Embargo
  - Pirámide
- Dejar zumbar 2
  - Química
  - ¡Ay, qué calor!

=== Collaborations ===
- Salinas, with Jaime del Hierro
- Lila sessions n.º 4: Aire del Golfo, with Santi Beats
