= 2014–15 Euroleague qualifying rounds =

Tournament details
- Arena: Sleuyter Arena; Ostend, Belgium
- Dates: September 23–26, 2015

Final positions
- Champions: (Russia) UNICS Kazan
- Runners-up: (France) ASVEL

The 2014–15 Euroleague qualifying rounds was a tournament held before the 2014–15 Euroleague that determined which team would play in the regular season. Eight teams participated in a single-venue tournament format that was played in Ostend, Belgium from 23 to 26 September.

== Teams ==
The eight teams (in brackets, positions in their national leagues) are:

- (Czech Republic) ČEZ Nymburk (1)
- (Latvia) VEF Rīga (2)
- (Poland) Stelmet Zielona Góra (2)
- (France) Strasbourg (2)
- (Belgium) Telenet Oostende (1)
- (Russia) UNICS (3)
- (Israel) Hapoel Jerusalem (3)
- (France) ASVEL (7)

== Draw ==
Teams will be seeded into four pots of two teams in accordance with the Club Ranking, based on their performance in European competitions during a three-year period and the teams granted a Wild Card by ECA will be seeded above the rest of the teams.

Pot 1	Pot 2	Pot 3	Pot 4
(Russia) UNICS^ (111) (Latvia) VEF Rīga^ (55)	(Israel) Hapoel Jerusalem^{^} (53) (France) ASVEL^{^} (33)	(Czech Republic) ČEZ Nymburk (72) (Belgium) Telenet Oostende (43)	(Poland) Stelmet Zielona Góra (39) (France) Strasbourg (29^{†})

Notes:

- ^ denotes a team with a wildcard granted.
- † indicates a team with points applying the minimum for the league it plays.

== Bracket ==
Qualifying Round 1
1	(Russia) UNICS	90
4	(Poland) Stelmet Zielona Góra	86
2	(Israel) Hapoel Jerusalem	94
3	(Czech Republic) ČEZ Nymburk	84
2	(France) ASVEL	86
3	(Belgium) Telenet Oostend	77
1	(Latvia) VEF Rīga	53
4	(France) Strasbourg IG	82

Qualifying Round 2
1	(Russia) UNICS	82
2	(Israel) Hapoel Jerusalem	71
2	(France) ASVEL	74
4	(France) Strasbourg IG	65

Qualifying Round 3
1	(Russia) UNICS	88
2	(France) ASVEL	79

== First round ==
September 23, 2014
18:00 (CET)

Stats

VEF Rīga (Latvia)	53–82	(France) Strasbourg IG
Scoring by quarter: 19–22, 13–20, 10–23, 11–17
Pts: Robinson 14; Rebs: Mejeris 7 Asts: Dillard 4		Pts: Diot, Traoré 15; Rebs: Traoré 6 Asts: Dobbins, Howard 5

Sleuyter Arena, Ostend
Attendance: 1,211
Referees: Sreten Radovic (CRO), Rustu Nuran (TUR), Benjamin Jimenez (ESP)

September 23, 2014
20:45 (CET)

Stats

ASVEL (France)	86–77	(Belgium) Telenet Oostende
Scoring by quarter: 24–20, 19–23, 19–13, 24–21
Pts: Sy 23; Rebs: Sy 10; Asts: Lighty 5		Pts: Ponitka 17; Rebs: Prince 6 Asts: Serron, Muya Muboyayi 4

Sleuyter Arena, Ostend
Attendance: 3,824
Referees: Sasa Pukl (SLO), Ioannis Foufis (GRE), Piotr Pastusiak (POL)

September 24, 2014
18:00 (CET)

Stats

Hapoel Jerusalem (Israel)	94–84	(Czech Republic) CEZ Nymburk
Scoring by quarter: 24-21, 24-18, 24-17, 22-28
Pts: Wright 22; Rebs: Jones, Gaffney 8 Asts: Halperin, Kitchen 5		Pts: Washington, Simmons 18; Rebs: Kriz 9 Asts: Washington 10

Sleuyter Arena, Ostend
Attendance: 839
Referees: Ilija Belosevic (SRB), Sreten Radovic (CRO), Piotr Pastusiak (POL)

September 24, 2014
20:45 (CET)

Stats

UNICS (Russia)	90–86	(Poland) Stelmet Zielona Góra
Scoring by quarter: 23-13, 23-19, 18-22, 26-32
Pts: Langford, Jerrells 22; Rebs: Fischer 10; Asts: Jerrells 6		Pts: Burtt 30; Rebs: Troutman 7 Asts: Koszarek 5

Sleuyter Arena, Ostend
Attendance: 723
Referees: Sasa Pukl (SLO), Robert Lottermoser (GER), Rustu Nuran (TUR)

== Second round ==
September 25, 2014
18:00 (CET)

Stats

ASVEL (France)	74–65	(France) Strasbourg IG
Scoring by quarter: 19–15, 18–17, 15–17, 22–16
Pts: Green 15; Rebs: Lighty 12; Asts: Green 12		Pts: Traoré 14; Rebs: Howard 10; Asts: Campbell 6

Sleuyter Arena, Ostend
Attendance: 385
Referees: Sasa Pukl (SLO), Robert Lottermoser (GER), Ioannis Foufis (GRE)

September 25, 2014
20:45 (CET)

Stats

UNICS (Russia)	82–71	(Israel) Hapoel Jerusalem
Scoring by quarter: 16–16, 19–25, 23–13, 24–17
Pts: Fischer 16; Rebs: Kaimakoglou 7 Asts: Zisis 6		Pts: Jones 12; Rebs: Gaffney, Smith 5 Asts: Kitchen 6

Sleuyter Arena, Ostend
Attendance: 20
Referees: Ilija Belosevic (SRB), Rustu Nuran (TUR), Benjamin Jimenez (ESP)

== Third round ==
September 26, 2014
20:30 (CET)

Stats

UNICS (Russia)	88–79	(France) ASVEL
Scoring by quarter: 22–20, 17–33, 25–11, 24–15
Pts: White 21; Rebs: Fischer, Kaimakoglou 8 Asts: Langford 6		Pts: Andersen 27; Rebs: Andersen 9 Asts: Green 8

Sleuyter Arena, Ostend
Attendance: 1,845
Referees: Sasa Pukl (SLO), Ilija Belosevic (SRB), Sreten Radovic (CRO)
