= Joaquín Portugués =

Spanish basketball player

No. 21 – Free agent
- Position: Point guard

Personal information
- Born: September 21, 1995 (age 31) Santa Cruz de Tenerife, Spain
- Listed height: 1.86 m (6 ft 1 in)

Career history
- 2012–2016: Gran Canaria B
- 2014–2017: Gran Canaria
- 2017–2018: Prat
- 2018–2019: Wetterbydgen Stars
- 2019–2020: Círculo Gijón

Joaquín Portugués García (born 21 September 1995 in Santa Cruz de Tenerife, Spain) is a professional basketball player who last played for Spanish club Círculo Gijón of the LEB Plata league.

== Pro career ==
After playing his first years at Tenerife CB, Portugués joined CB Gran Canaria for playing with the under-16 team. In 2012, he was named in the provisional roster of the Under-17 World Cup, but he was not finally chosen. Also in that season, he joined trainings with LEB Oro team UB La Palma, but not being called for any game.

In 2012, Portugués made his professional debut with Gran Canaria reserves at LEB Plata league and during the 2014–15 season he would make his debut in Liga ACB and play five EuroCup games, in the season that the club ended as runner-up of the competition.

In 2019, after spending one season in the Swedish league with Wetterbydgen Stars, Portugués comes back to Spain for playing with LEB Plata team Círculo Gijón.
