= Ruslan Pateev =

Russian basketball player

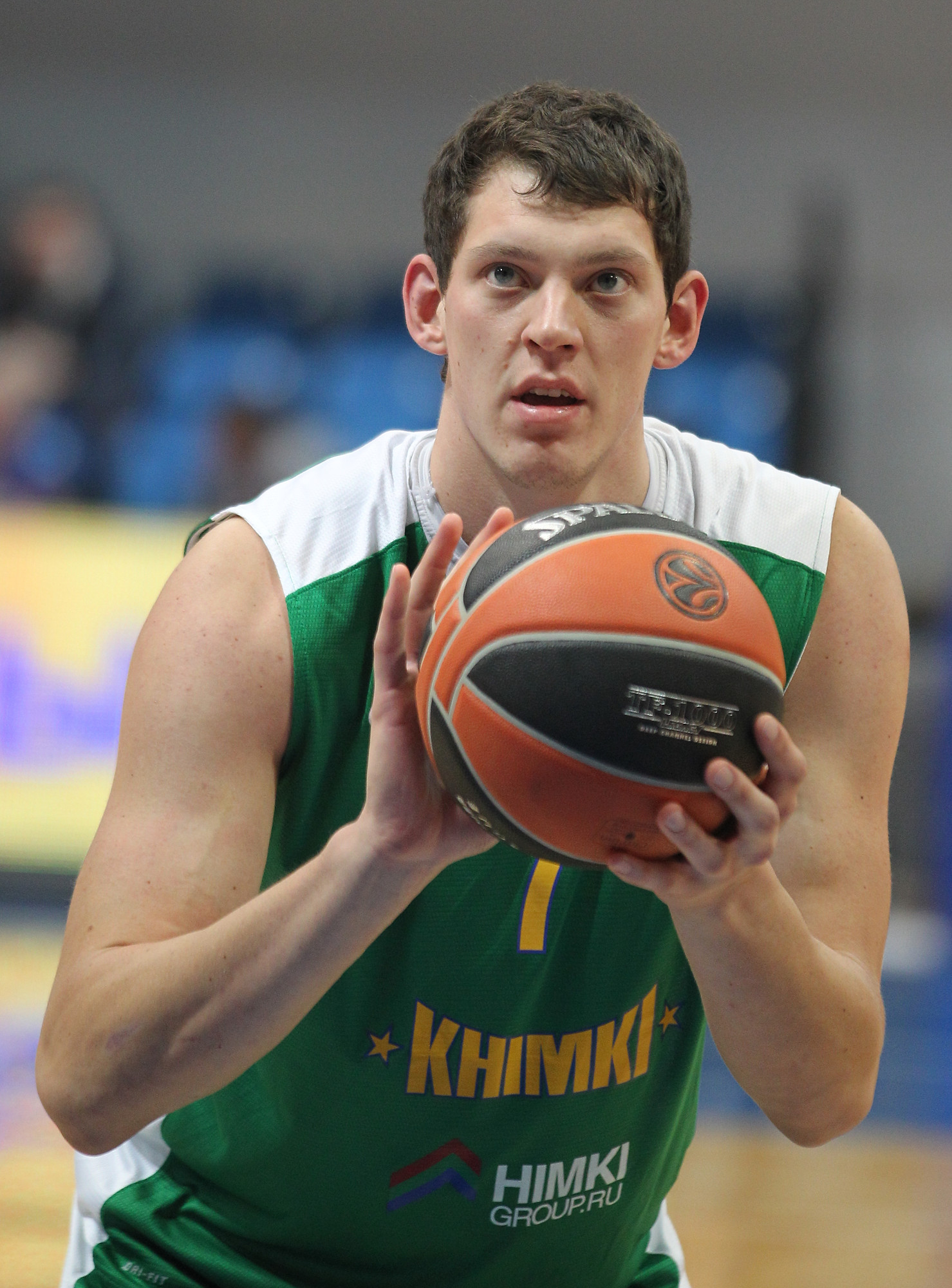

Personal information
- Born: April 25, 1990 (age 36) Moscow, Soviet Union
- Listed height: 7 ft 0 in (2.13 m)
- Listed weight: 250 lb (113 kg)

Career information
- High school: Montverde Academy (Montverde, Florida)
- College: Arizona State (2009–2013)
- NBA draft: 2013: undrafted
- Playing career: 2013–2022
- Position: Center

Career history
- 2013–2018: Khimki
- 2018–2019: Legia Warszawa
- 2019–2021: MBA Moscow
- 2021–2022: Khimki

Ruslan Menirovich Pateev (Russian: Руслан Мэнирович Патеев,Tatar: Ruslan Mönir ulı Pateev, born April 25, 1990) is a Russian former professional basketball player. He was born in Moscow, Soviet Union, and played college basketball at Arizona State University.

== Early career ==
Pateev started his youth club basketball career in 2005, in Khimki's youth teams, where he played in the European Youth Basketball League. In 2007, he moved to Montverde Academy, in Florida, United States, where he spent two years, playing under head coach Kevin Sutton.

== College career ==
In 2009, Pateev moved to Arizona State University, where he played college basketball, with the Arizona State Sun Devils, until 2013.

== Professional career ==
In September 2013, Pateev signed a two-year pro-contract with the Russian VTB United League team Khimki Moscow Region.

In August 2018, Pateev signed a deal with the Polish basketball team Legia Warsaw from the top Polish division. He averaged 6.9 points and 3.4 rebounds per game. In 2019, he signed up with MBA Moscow for the Russian Basketball Super League 1. Pateev re-signed with the team on August 25, 2020.
