= Álvaro Sanz =

Spanish footballer (born 2001)

Personal information
- Full name: Álvaro Sanz Catalán
- Date of birth: 14 February 2001 (age 25)
- Place of birth: Caspe, Spain
- Height: 1.70 m (5 ft 7 in)
- Position: Midfielder

Team information
- Current team: Al Shahaniya
- Number: 6

Youth career
- Caspe
- 2012–2015: Zaragoza
- 2015–2020: Barcelona

Senior career*
Years	Team	Apps	(Gls)
2020–2023	Barcelona B	59	(2)
2022–2023	Barcelona	2	(0)
2023–2024	Mirandés	56	(1)
2024–2025	Racing Ferrol	40	(0)
2025–	Al Shahaniya	22	(1)

International career
2018	Spain U17	3	(0)
2018–2019	Spain U18	6	(1)
2019–2020	Spain U19	10	(0)
- * Club domestic league appearances and goals as of 08:28, 7 June 2026 (UTC)

Álvaro Sanz Catalán (born 14 February 2001) is a Spanish professional footballer who plays as a midfielder for Al Shahaniya.

== Club career ==
=== Barcelona ===
Born in Caspe, Zaragoza, Aragon, Sanz started his career with CD Caspe before joining Real Zaragoza's youth setup. In 2015, aged 14, he moved to FC Barcelona's La Masia.

On 26 June 2020, after finishing his formation, Sanz signed a new three-year contract with Barça, being promoted to the reserves in Segunda División B. He made his senior debut on 18 October, coming on as a late substitute in a 1–0 home win over Gimnàstic de Tarragona.

Sanz made his first team – and La Liga – debut on 2 January 2022, replacing fellow youth graduate Nico González in a 1–0 away success over RCD Mallorca.

=== Mirandés ===
On 20 January 2023, Sanz signed a two-and-a-half-year contract with Segunda División side CD Mirandés. He scored his first professional goal on 14 October, netting the opener in a 1–1 home draw against CD Tenerife.

=== Racing Ferrol ===
On 3 July 2024, Sanz moved to fellow second division side Racing de Ferrol on a one-year deal.

=== Al-Shahaniya ===
On 5 July 2025, Sanz moved to fellow qatar stars league side Al Shahaniya.

== Career statistics ==
=== Club ===
As of 29 Sept 2022.

Appearances and goals by club, season and competition
Club	Season	League			Cup		Europe		Other		Total	
Club	Season	Division	Apps	Goals	Apps	Goals	Apps	Goals	Apps	Goals	Apps	Goals
Barcelona B	2020–21	Segunda División B	16	0	—		—		—		16	0
Barcelona B	2021–22	Primera División RFEF	31	1	—		—		—		31	1
Barcelona B	2022–23	Primera Federación	3	1	—		—		—		3	1
Barcelona B	Total		50	2	—		—		—		50	2
Barcelona	2021–22	La Liga	2	0	1	0	0	0	0	0	3	0
Career total			52	2	1	0	0	0	0	0	53	2

== Honours ==
Spain U19

- UEFA European Under-19 Championship: 2019
