= Robert Swift =

American basketball player (born 1985)

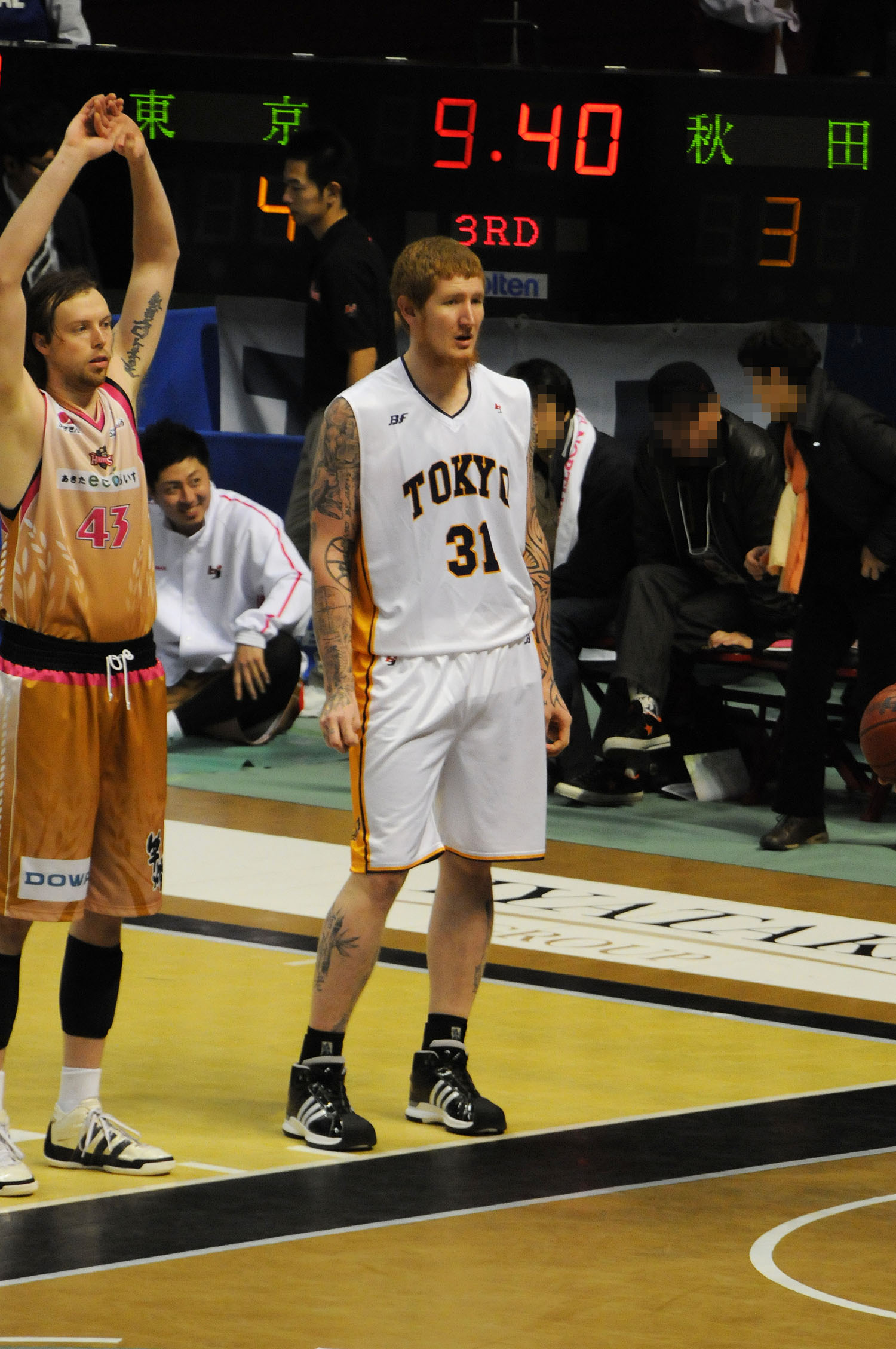
- Swift in 2010

Personal information
- Born: December 3, 1985 (age 40) Bakersfield, California, U.S.
- Listed height: 7 ft 1 in (2.16 m)
- Listed weight: 280 lb (127 kg)

Career information
- High school: Garces Memorial (Bakersfield, California); Bakersfield (Bakersfield, California)
- NBA draft: 2004: 1st round, 12th overall pick
- Drafted by: Seattle SuperSonics
- Playing career: 2004–2021
- Position: Center

Career history
- 2004–2009: Seattle SuperSonics / Oklahoma City Thunder
- 2009: Bakersfield Jam
- 2010: Seattle Aviators
- 2010: Snohomish County Explosion
- 2010–2011: Tokyo Apache
- 2018–2021: Círculo Gijón

Career highlights
- Second-team Parade All-American (2004); McDonald's All-American (2004)

Career statistics
- Points: 416 (4.3 ppg)
- Rebounds: 376 (3.9 rpg)
- Assists: 20 (0.2 apg)
- Stats at NBA.com
- Stats at Basketball Reference

Robert Christen Swift (born December 3, 1985) is an American former professional basketball player who last played for Spanish club Círculo Gijón Baloncesto y Conocimiento of the LEB Plata league. He played in the National Basketball Association for the Seattle SuperSonics / Oklahoma City Thunder from 2004 through 2009, for the Seattle Aviators and Snohomish County Explosion of the National Athletic Basketball League in 2010, and for the Tokyo Apache of the bj League in 2010–11. He stands at 7 feet 1 inch (2.16 m) and played the center position.

== High school ==
Swift caught the attention of NBA and college scouts while playing for Garces Memorial High School, and then later as the centerpiece of the Bakersfield High School team.

During his time at Garces, the small Catholic high school broke into the USA Today top-25 high school basketball team rankings. Between his junior and senior years, Swift transferred from Garces to Highland High School, and then just before his senior year, he transferred to Bakersfield High School. This move provoked a hearing by the California Interscholastic Federation that initially declared Swift ineligible for the 2003–04 season; however, this ruling was later overturned and he played his senior season. He committed to attend the University of Southern California (USC) to play for the USC Trojans men's basketball team on a scholarship.

== National Basketball Association ==
Swift was selected by the Seattle SuperSonics in the first round with the twelfth overall pick in the 2004 NBA draft. Swift bypassed college and opted for the NBA, turning down his commitment to play for USC.

In his first season with the Sonics, Swift played in 16 games, averaging 4.5 minutes, 0.9 points, 0.4 rebounds, and 0.4 blocks per game. In his second season, under the direction of coach Bob Hill, he started 20 out of 47 games, averaging 21 minutes, 6.4 points, 5.6 rebounds, and 1.2 blocks per game.

In 2006, the Sonics anticipated that Swift would become their starting center. Swift was awarded the starting job at center but he ruptured the anterior cruciate ligament in his right knee after playing just over one minute in a preseason game vs the Sacramento Kings. The resulting injury occurred when he twisted his right knee when he fell and went out of bounds awkwardly in front of the Seattle bench. Swift suffered another injury to his right knee in February 2008, a torn lateral meniscus.

Swift's final NBA game was played on April 13, 2009, in an 83–113 loss to the Portland Trail Blazers where he recorded 2 points, 3 rebounds and 2 blocks. On December 22, 2009, the Oklahoma City Thunder renounced the rights to Swift.

== D-League and Japan ==
In 2009, Swift joined the Bakersfield Jam of the NBA D-League. However, he left the team for personal reasons after appearing in two games. He was overweight and experienced a decrease in mobility.

During the 2010–11 season, Swift played for Tokyo Apache with his former head coach in Seattle, Bob Hill. Swift played well, receiving interest from the NBA's Boston Celtics and New York Knicks. Following the 2011 Tōhoku earthquake and tsunami, the Apache ended their season prematurely and disbanded. Swift tried out for the Portland Trail Blazers in April 2011, but was not offered a contract.

== Spain ==
On 12 February 2018, Swift returned to play basketball after agreeing a two-year contract with Spanish fifth tier club Círculo Gijón.

In his second season in Spain, the club achieved a vacant place in the professional third-tier league, LEB Plata. He left the team after the end of the season averaging 9.1 points and 4.8 rebounds per game. However, Swift came back to Círculo Gijón on 29 December 2019.

== Personal life ==
Robert's father, Bruce, was unable to work for two years due to a car accident that occurred while Robert was a child. He filed for bankruptcy twice: in 1999 and 2003. Robert's mother, Rhonda, was diagnosed with cancer and had multiple surgeries to remove it. The Swifts dealt with food insecurity.

In 2009, Swift's girlfriend became pregnant. In June 2011, Swift was arrested for driving under the influence. He was found guilty of reckless driving.

In 2013, Swift refused to vacate his foreclosed home, which had been bought by a new owner. The new owner bought the house in Sammamish, Washington, in January 2013 for half the price Swift paid in 2006. Swift eventually left the home, which was reportedly riddled with animal feces, guns, bullets, beer bottles, and garbage. Observers also noted old letters from some of the top college basketball programs in the country trying to recruit Swift, before he went straight to the NBA from high school.

In October 2014, police raided the house of Trygve Bjorkstam, an alleged heroin and methamphetamine dealer, who had a collection of 18 guns. They found Swift living in the home, and in possession of a sawed-off shotgun. In November 2014, police charged Swift with unlawful possession of a short-barreled shotgun.

On January 8, 2015, Swift was arrested by police for involvement in an armed home invasion attempt. Swift claimed he was high on drugs at the time of the incident.

== NBA career statistics ==
Legend
GP	Games played	GS	Games started	MPG	Minutes per game
FG%	Field goal percentage	3P%	3-point field goal percentage	FT%	Free throw percentage
RPG	Rebounds per game	APG	Assists per game	SPG	Steals per game
BPG	Blocks per game	PPG	Points per game	**Bold**	Career high

=== Regular season ===
Year	Team	GP	GS	MPG	FG%	3P%	FT%	RPG	APG	SPG	BPG	PPG
2004–05	Seattle	16	0	4.5	.455	.000	.556	.3	.1	.1	.4	1.0
2005–06	Seattle	**47**	**20**	**21.0**	.515	.000	.582	**5.6**	.2	.3	**1.2**	**6.4**
2007–08	Seattle	8	4	12.3	.353	.000	**1.000**	2.3	.1	**.6**	.8	2.0
2008–09	Oklahoma City	26	10	13.2	**.521**	.000	.750	3.4	**.3**	.2	.7	3.3
Career		97	34	15.5	.506	.000	.610	4.0	.2	.3	.9	4.3

== See also ==
- List of oldest and youngest National Basketball Association players
