= Saúl Blanco =

Spanish basketball player

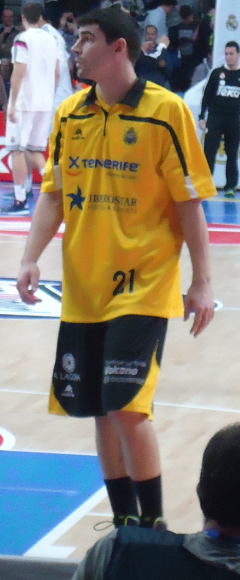

Liberbank Oviedo Baloncesto
- Position: Small forward
- League: LEB Oro

Personal information
- Born: May 15, 1985 (age 41) Oviedo, Spain
- Listed height: 1.96 m (6 ft 5 in)

Career information
- Playing career: 2003–present

Career history
- 2003–2005: Gijón Baloncesto
- 2005–2009: Fuenlabrada
- 2009–2012: Unicaja
- 2012: Fuenlabrada
- 2012–2016: Canarias
- 2017–2018: Sevilla
- 2018: Prat
- 2018–2019: Círculo Gijón
- 2019–2020: Gries Oberhoffen
- 2020–: Oviedo

Saúl Blanco González (born May 15, 1985, in Oviedo, Spain) is a professional basketball player who plays for Spanish club Liberbank Oviedo Baloncesto of the LEB Oro league.

== Pro career ==
Blanco started his career in 2003 at LEB team Gijón Baloncesto. Two years later, he debuts in Liga ACB with Baloncesto Fuenlabrada, where his good performance allows him to sign with Euroleague squad Unicaja. In 2012, he signs for CB Canarias.

Blanco played also for the Asturias basketball team.

In 2017, after an absence of one year, Blanco returned to the professional basketball by signing for Real Betis Energía Plus of the Liga ACB. However, he rescinded his contract before the end of the season, finishing it at LEB Oro team CB Prat.

On August 27, 2018, Blanco came back to Asturias and signed with Círculo Gijón Baloncesto y Conocimiento of the LEB Plata. Despite not avoiding relegation with the club, he was named member of the All-season team.

== Awards and accomplishments ==
=== Spanish junior national team ===
- 2001 FIBA Europe Under-16 Championship: Bronze

=== Personal awards ===
- All LEB Plata team: 2018–19

== Euroleague statistics ==
Legend
GP	Games played	GS	Games started	MPG	Minutes per game
FG%	Field-goal percentage	3P%	3-point field-goal percentage	FT%	Free-throw percentage
RPG	Rebounds per game	APG	Assists per game	SPG	Steals per game
BPG	Blocks per game	PPG	Points per game	PIR	Performance index rating
**Bold**	Career high

Year	Team	GP	GS	MPG	FG%	3P%	FT%	RPG	APG	SPG	BPG	PPG	PIR
2009–10	Unicaja	9	2	14.9	.414	**.500**	.833	1.3	.6	.4	.0	4.6	5.0
2010–11	Unicaja	**13**	**7**	**23.0**	.396	.364	.955	**3.0**	**.9**	**.9**	**.2**	**8.4**	**8.2**
2011–12	Unicaja	7	0	8.5	**.444**	.250	**1.000**	.9	.3	.1	.0	2.9	2.4
Career		29	9	17.0	.406	.382	.917	2.0	.6	.7	.1	5.9	5.8
