= 2014–15 Eurocup Basketball =

- Season: 2014–15
- Duration: 14 October 2014 – 29 April 2015
- Teams: 44

Regular season
- Season MVP: (Montenegro) Tyrese Rice

Finals
- Champions: (Russia) Khimki (2nd title)
- Runners-up: (Spain) Herbalife Gran Canaria
- Finals MVP: (Montenegro) Tyrese Rice

Awards
- Rising Star: (Latvia) Kristaps Porziņģis
- Coach of the Year: (Spain) Aíto García Reneses

Statistical leaders
Points	(United States) Randy Culpepper	19.2
Rebounds	(United States) Sharrod Ford	8.9
Assists	(United States) Mike Green	7.4
Index Rating	(United States) Derrick Brown	19.8

The 2014–15 Eurocup Basketball season was the 13th edition of Europe's second-tier level transnational competition for men's professional basketball clubs, the EuroCup. The EuroCup is the European-wide league level that is one level below the EuroLeague.

Khimki won the competition, after beating Herbalife Gran Canaria in the Finals, and earned a spot in the regular season of the 2015–16 Euroleague.

== Competition format ==
The competition format was the same as in the 2013–14 season, but reducing the Regular Season. For this year 36 teams joined this first stage and were divided into two conferences.

The Regular Season featured six groups of six teams each one, where the four best teams qualified to the Last 32 stage with the eight teams that do not qualify to the 2014–15 Euroleague Top 16. From this stage to the final, the format was the same as in the last season.

== Teams ==
Teams were confirmed on June 26 by the company Euroleague Basketball.

Key to colors
Champion	Runner-up	Semifinalist	Quarterfinalist	Eighthfinalist	Last 32	Regular season

Country (League)	Teams	Teams (rankings in 2013–14 national championships)				
Regular season
France (LNB)	5	Strasbourg (2)	Nancy (3)	Dijon (4)	Paris-Levallois^{†} (6)	ASVEL^{^} (7)
Germany (BBL)	4	Oldenburg (3)	Artland Dragons (4)	Brose Bamberg^{†} (5)	Telekom Bonn^{†} (6)	
Russia (VTB)	4	Khimki (5)	Lokomotiv Kuban (6)	Zenit (Note: Triumph Lyubertsy was relocated to Saint Petersburg and renamed to Zenit.) (Note: Triumph Lyubertsy and Reggio Emilia were qualified as the Finalists of the 2013–14 EuroChallenge) (8)	Krasny Oktyabr^{†} (11)	
Italy (Lega A)	3	Acea Roma (4)	FoxTown Cantù^{†} (5)	Grissin Bon Reggio Emilia (7)		
Spain (ACB)	3	Herbalife Gran Canaria (5)	Sevilla (7)	CAI Zaragoza (8)		
Turkey (TBL)	3	Banvit (3)	Pınar Karşıyaka (4)	Beşiktaş İntegral Forex^{†} (6)		
Belgium (BLB)	2	Telenet Oostende^{^} (1)	Spirou Charleroi^{†} (5)			
Latvia (LBL)	2	Ventspils (1)	VEF Rīga^{^} (2)			
Czech Republic (NBL)	1	ČEZ Nymburk^{^} (1)				
Greece (GBL)	1	PAOK (3)				
Hungary (NB1/A)	1	Szolnoki Olaj^{†} (1)				
Israel (BSL)	1	Hapoel Jerusalem^{^} (3)				
Lithuania (LKL)	1	Lietuvos Rytas (3)				
Montenegro (ABA)	1	Budućnost VOLI (5)				
Poland (PLK)	1	Stelmet Zielona Góra^{^} (2)				
Romania (RBD)	1	Asesoft Ploiești^{†} (1)				
Serbia (ABA)	1	Partizan NIS (4)				
Slovenia (ABA)	1	Union Olimpija^{†} (10)				
Last 32
Spain (ACB)	1	Valencia (3)				
Russia (VTB)	1	UNICS (3)				
Germany (BBL)	1	Bayern Munich (1)				
Italy (Serie A)	1	Dinamo Sassari (3)				
Lithuania (LKL)	1	Neptūnas (2)				
Croatia (ABA)	1	Cedevita (2)				
France (Pro A)	1	Limoges (1)				
Poland (PLK)	1	PGE Turów Zgorzelec (1)				

Notes:
† Qualified through wild card
^ Qualified as loser of Euroleague qualifying round

== Draw ==
The draws for the 2014–15 Eurocup were held on Monday, 29 September, after the Euroleague Qualifying Rounds were played.

Teams were divided into two geographical conferences with 18 teams and 3 groups each. For the each conference teams were seeded into six pots of Three teams in accordance with the Club Ranking, based on their performance in European competitions during a three-year period.

Two teams from the same country could not be drawn together in the same Regular Season group if possible. The nations from the former Yugoslavia, which compete jointly in the Adriatic League—Serbia, Croatia, Slovenia, Montenegro, Macedonia and Bosnia and Herzegovina—are considered as one country for purposes of the draw.

== Western Conference ==
Pot 1	Pot 2	Pot 3	Pot 4	Pot 5	Pot 6
(Czech Republic) ČEZ Nymburk (72) (Italy) FoxTown Cantù (66) (Germany) Brose Bamberg (64)	(Spain) CAI Zaragoza (52) (Spain) Sevilla (52) (Spain) Herbalife Gran Canaria (52)	(Belgium) Telenet Oostende (43) (Italy) Acea Roma (40) (Italy) Grissin Bon Reggio Emilia (40)	(France) ASVEL (33) (Belgium) Spirou Charleroi (31) (France) Strasbourg (29)	(France) Paris-Levallois (29) (France) Nancy (29) (France) Dijon (29)	(Germany) Artland Dragons (25) (Germany) Oldenburg (25) (Germany) Telekom Bonn (25)

== Eastern Conference ==
Pot 1	Pot 2	Pot 3	Pot 4	Pot 5	Pot 6
(Russia) Khimki (111) (Russia) Lokomotiv Kuban (102) (Lithuania) Lietuvos Rytas (71)	(Turkey) Banvit (66) (Turkey) Beşiktaş Integral Forex (65) (Turkey) Pınar Karşıyaka (65)	(Montenegro) Budućnost VOLI (63) (Russia) Zenit (61) (Russia) Krasny Oktyabr (61)	(Serbia) Partizan NIS (59) (Latvia) VEF Rīga (55) (Latvia) Ventspils (55)	(Israel) Hapoel Jerusalem (53) (Slovenia) Union Olimpija (48) (Poland) Stelmet Zielona Góra (39)	(Greece) PAOK (30) (Romania) Asesoft Ploiești (13) (Hungary) Szolnoki Olaj (12)

== Regular season ==
Location of teams of the 2013–14 Eurocup
Western Conference: Red: Group A; Green: Group B; Blue: Group C;
Eastern Conference: Yellow: Group D; Pink: Group E; Orange: Group F;

The Regular Season runs from Tuesday, October 14 to Wednesday, December 17.

If teams were level on record at the end of the Regular Season, tiebreakers were applied in the following order:

1. Head-to-head record.
2. Head-to-head point differential.
3. Point differential during the Regular Season.
4. Points scored during the regular season.
5. Sum of quotients of points scored and points allowed in each Regular Season match.

Key to colors
Top four teams in each group advance to Last 32.

=== Western Conference ===
==== Group A ====
Pos	Team	Pld	W	L	PF	PA	PD
1	(France) Strasbourg	10	8	2	742	701	+41
2	(Germany) Brose Bamberg	10	6	4	768	672	+96
3	(France) Paris-Levallois	10	5 (Note: Head-to-head: 1-1 (+2))	5	753	759	−6
4	(Spain) CAI Zaragoza	10	5 (Note: Head-to-head: 1-1 (-2))	5	831	812	+19
5	(Germany) Telekom Bonn	10	4	6	774	851	−77
6	(Italy) Grissin Bon Reggio Emilia	10	2	8	735	808	−73

Source: Euroleague Basketball

==== Group B ====
Pos	Team	Pld	W	L	GF	GA	GD
1	(Spain) Herbalife Gran Canaria	10	10	0	837	704	+133
2	(Belgium) Telenet Oostende	10	6 (Note: Head-to-head: 1-1 (0))	4	768	766	+2
3	(France) Dijon	10	6 (Note: Head-to-head: 1-1 (0))	4	710	739	−29
4	(Italy) Foxtown Cantù	10	4	6	738	752	−14
5	(France) ASVEL	10	3	7	744	791	−47
6	(Germany) Artland Dragons	10	1	9	725	770	−45

Source: Euroleague Basketball

==== Group C ====
Pos	Team	Pld	W	L	PF	PA	PD
1	(Italy) Acea Roma	10	7	3	826	773	+53
2	(France) Nancy	10	6	4	776	742	+34
3	(Czech Republic) ČEZ Nymburk	10	5 (Note: Head-to-head: 2-0)	5	771	780	−9
4	(Spain) Sevilla	10	5 (Note: Head-to-head: 0-2)	5	776	757	+19
5	(Germany) Oldenburg	10	4	6	737	737	0
6	(Belgium) Spirou Charleroi	10	3	7	705	802	−97

Source: Euroleague Basketball

=== Eastern Conference ===
==== Group D ====
Pos	Team	Pld	W	L	PF	PA	PD
1	(Russia) Khimki	10	8	2	872	756	+116
2	(Turkey) Beşiktaş Integral Forex	10	7	3	773	705	+68
3	(Slovenia) Union Olimpija	10	6	4	800	782	+18
4	(Russia) Zenit	10	5	5	808	809	−1
5	(Hungary) Szolnoki Olaj	10	3	7	748	822	−74
6	(Latvia) VEF Rīga	10	1	9	705	832	−127

Source: Euroleague Basketball

==== Group E ====
Pos	Team	Pld	W	L	PF	PA	PD
1	(Lithuania) Lietuvos Rytas	10	8	2	840	774	+66
2	(Turkey) Banvit	10	6 (Note: Head-to-head: 1-1 (+3))	4	788	768	+20
3	(Russia) Krasny Oktyabr	10	6 (Note: Head-to-head: 1-1 (-3))	4	759	765	−6
4	(Romania) Asesoft Ploiești	10	5	5	814	833	−19
5	(Serbia) Partizan NIS	10	3	7	734	774	−40
6	(Israel) Hapoel Jerusalem	10	2	8	806	827	−21

Source: Euroleague Basketball

==== Group F ====
Pos	Team	Pld	W	L	PF	PA	PD
1	(Russia) Lokomotiv Kuban	10	10	0	795	653	+142
2	(Greece) PAOK	10	6 (Note: Head-to-head: 1-1 (+1))	4	726	726	0
3	(Turkey) Pınar Karşıyaka	10	6 (Note: Head-to-head: 1-1 (-1))	4	780	763	+17
4	(Montenegro) Budućnost VOLI	10	3 (Note: Head-to-head: 2-0)	7	784	797	−13
5	(Poland) Stelmet Zielona Góra	10	3 (Note: Head-to-head: 0-2)	7	722	809	−87
6	(Latvia) Ventspils	10	2	8	665	724	−59

Source: Euroleague Basketball

== Last 32 ==
The Last 32 phase runs from Tuesday, January 6 to Wednesday, February 11.

If teams were level on record at the end of the Last 32 phase, tiebreakers were applied in the following order:

1. Head-to-head record.
2. Head-to-head point differential.
3. Point differential during the Last 32 phase.
4. Points scored during the Last 32 phase.
5. Sum of quotients of points scored and points allowed in each Last 32 phase match.

Key to colors
Top two teams in each group advance to the Eurocup eightfinals.

=== Group G ===
Pos	Team	Pld	W	L	PF	PA	PD	UNK	ZEN	SIG	NYM
1	(Russia) UNICS	6	4	2	460	432	+28		103–67	60–82	75–67
2	(Russia) Zenit	6	3	3	439	479	−40	65–77		87–82	63–84
3	(France) Strasbourg	6	3	3	450	433	+17	72–61	61–73		87–80
4	(Czech Republic) ČEZ Nymburk	6	2	4	454	459	−5	79–84	72–84	72–66	

Source: Euroleague Basketball;
Legend: Blue = home team win; Yellow = draw; Red = away team win.

=== Group H ===
Pos	Team	Pld	W	L	PF	PA	PD	HGC	BAN	DSS	POD
1	(Spain) Herbalife Gran Canaria	6	5	1	522	462	+60		91–80	90–74	92–69
2	(Turkey) Banvit	6	4	2	484	450	+34	80–70		74–75	87–74
3	(Italy) Dinamo Sassari	6	2	4	470	507	−37	76–91	72–89		87–70
4	(Montenegro) Budućnost VOLI	6	1	5	457	514	−57	83–88	68–74	93–86	

Source: Euroleague Basketball;
Legend: Blue = home team win; Yellow = draw; Red = away team win.

=== Group I ===
Pos	Team	Pld	W	L	PF	PA	PD	ROM	CED	OKT	CAI
1	(Italy) Acea Roma	6	4	2	473	442	+31		73–66	82–66	87–66
2	(Croatia) Cedevita	6	4	2	500	493	+7	91–90		92–101	83–80
3	(Russia) Krasny Oktyabr	6	3	3	471	482	−11	86–88	65–83		71–66
4	(Spain) CAI Zaragoza	6	1	5	434	461	−27	67–53	84–85	71–82	

Source: Euroleague Basketball;
Legend: Blue = home team win; Yellow = draw; Red = away team win.

=== Group J ===
Pos	Team	Pld	W	L	PF	PA	PD	KHI	CTU	LIM	PBC
1	(Russia) Khimki	6	5	1	512	449	+63		75–62	79–70	102–68
2	(Italy) Foxtown Cantù	6	3	3	454	449	+5	99–88		68–57	78–70
3	(France) Limoges	6	3	3	430	430	0	72–86	81–70		71–59
4	(Greece) PAOK	6	1	5	421	489	−68	78–82	78–77	68–79	

Source: Euroleague Basketball;
Legend: Blue = home team win; Yellow = draw; Red = away team win.

=== Group K ===
Pos	Team	Pld	W	L	PF	PA	PD	BAY	BRO	JDA	UOL
1	(Germany) Bayern Munich	6	6	0	534	437	+97		87–63	93–84	90–84
2	(Germany) Brose Bamberg	6	3	3	444	474	−30	52–90		81–86	91–90
3	(France) Dijon	6	2	4	453	498	−45	74–84	56–86		77–81
4	(Slovenia) Union Olimpija	6	1	5	473	495	−22	80–90	65–71	73–76	

Source: Euroleague Basketball;
Legend: Blue = home team win; Yellow = draw; Red = away team win.

=== Group L ===
Pos	Team	Pld	W	L	PF	PA	PD	TUR	LRY	OST	SEV
1	(Poland) PGE Turów	6	5	1	553	501	+52		104–93	99–71	87–84
2	(Lithuania) Lietuvos Rytas	6	3	3	553	514	+39	98–86		111–83	100–78
3	(Belgium) Telenet Oostende	6	2	4	474	506	−32	79–80	75–69		72–84
4	(Spain) Sevilla	6	2	4	473	532	−59	76–97	88–82	63–94	

Source: Euroleague Basketball;
Legend: Blue = home team win; Yellow = draw; Red = away team win.

=== Group M ===
Pos	Team	Pld	W	L	PF	PA	PD	KSK	PLV	BJK	NEP
1	(Turkey) Pınar Karşıyaka	6	6	0	538	463	+75		86–79	73–64	99–85
2	(France) Paris-Levallois	6	3	3	485	486	−1	75–85		93–83	88–79
3	(Turkey) Beşiktaş Integral Forex	6	2	4	444	488	−44	77–105	71–77		80–78
4	(Lithuania) Neptūnas	6	1	5	469	499	−30	83–90	82–73	62–69	

Source: Euroleague Basketball;
Legend: Blue = home team win; Yellow = draw; Red = away team win.

=== Group N ===
Pos	Team	Pld	W	L	PF	PA	PD	LOK	VBC	ASE	SLU
1	(Russia) Lokomotiv Kuban	6	6	0	492	416	+76		74–62	92–79	85–70
2	(Spain) Valencia	6	3	3	490	459	+31	89–90		87–92	77–46
3	(Romania) Asesoft Ploiești	6	2	4	469	529	−60	59–85	84–100		88–81
4	(France) Nancy	6	1	5	411	458	−47	57–66	73–75	84–67	

Source: Euroleague Basketball;
Legend: Blue = home team win; Yellow = draw; Red = away team win.

== Knockout stage ==
In the knockout phase rounds will be played in a home-and-away format, with the overall cumulative score determining the winner of a round. Thus, the score of one single game can be tied.

- The team that finished in the higher Last 32 place will play the second game of the series at home.
- If both teams placed the same in the Last 32, the team with more Last 32 victories will play the second game at home.
- In case of a tie in both place and victories, the team with the higher cumulative Last 32 point difference will play the second game at home.

Eighthfinals
(Russia) UNICS	70	75	145
(Italy) FoxTown Cantù	64	72	136
(Russia) Lokomotiv Kuban	80	70	150
(Germany) Brose Bamberg	78	53	131
(Spain) Herbalife Gran Canaria	84	75	159
(Croatia) Cedevita	76	72	148
(Turkey) Pınar Karşıyaka	81	97	178
(Lithuania) Lietuvos Rytas	81	81	162
(Italy) Acea Roma	55	66	121
(Turkey) Banvit	71	56	127
(Poland) PGE Turów	71	78	149
(France) Paris-Levallois	74	87	161
(Russia) Khimki	86	89	175
(Russia) Zenit	84	70	154
(Germany) Bayern Munich	58	60	118
(Spain) Valencia	80	94	174

Quarterfinals
(Russia) UNICS	78	79	157
(Russia) Lokomotiv Kuban	87	58	145
(Spain) Herbalife Gran Canaria	76	75	151
(Turkey) Pınar Karşıyaka	66	74	140
(Turkey) Banvit	65	75	140
(France) Paris-Levallois	67	71	138
(Russia) Khimki	76	76	152
(Spain) Valencia	75	61	136

Semifinals
(Russia) UNICS	70	76	146
(Spain) Herbalife Gran Canaria	83	78	161
(Turkey) Banvit	83	89	172
(Russia) Khimki	82	93	175

Finals
(Spain) Herbalife Gran Canaria	66	64	130
(Russia) Khimki	91	83	174

=== Finals ===
==== First leg ====
24 April 2015
20:45

Boxscore

Herbalife Gran Canaria (Spain)	66–91	(Russia) Khimki
Scoring by quarter: 19–21, 14–19, 21–19, 12–32
Pts: Kuric 23; Rebs: Báez 7 Asts: Oliver 4		Pts: Koponen, Vyaltsev 18; Rebs: three players 6 Asts: Rice 5

Gran Canaria Arena, Las Palmas
Attendance: 9,875
Referees: Fernando Rocha (POR), Roberto Chiari (ITA), Rüştü Nuran (TUR)

==== Second leg ====
29 April 2015
18:30

Boxscore

Khimki (Russia)	83–64	(Spain) Herbalife Gran Canaria
Scoring by quarter: 27–18, 18–12, 23–16, 15–18
Pts: Augustine 18; Rebs: Davis 10; Asts: Popović 7		Pts: Tavares 17; Rebs: Tavares 10; Asts: Kendall 3
Khimki wins 174–130 on aggregate

Basketball Center, Khimki
Attendance: 3,850
Referees: Sasa Pukl (SLO), Milivoje Jovcic (SRB), Ioannis Foufis (GRE)

== Individual statistics ==
=== Rating ===
Rank	Name	Team	Games	Rating	PIR
1.	(United States) Derrick Brown	(Russia) Lokomotiv Kuban	18	356	19.78
2.	(North Macedonia) Romeo Travis	(Russia) Krasny Oktyabr	16	304	19.00
3.	(Turkey) Bobby Dixon	(Turkey) Pınar Karşıyaka	20	375	18.75

=== Points ===
Rank	Name	Team	Games	Points	PPG
1.	(United States) Randy Culpepper	(Russia) Krasny Oktyabr	13	249	19.15
2.	(United States) J.P. Prince	(Belgium) Telenet Oostende	16	274	17.13
3.	(Montenegro) Tyrese Rice	(Russia) Khimki	24	407	16.96

=== Rebounds ===
Rank	Name	Team	Games	Rebounds	RPG
1.	(United States) Sharrod Ford	(France) Paris-Levallois	20	177	8.85
2.	(United States) Trevor Mbakwe	(Germany) Brose Baskets	18	151	8.39
3.	(United States) Randal Falker	(France) Nancy	15	122	8.13

=== Assists ===
Rank	Name	Team	Games	Assists	APG
1.	(United States) Mike Green	(France) Paris-Levallois	20	147	7.35
2.	(United States) Brad Wanamaker	(Germany) Brose Baskets	18	116	6.44
3.	(United States Virgin Islands) Walter Hodge	(Russia) Zenit	18	113	6.28

== Awards ==
=== MVP Weekly ===
==== Regular season ====
Week	Player	Team	PIR
1	(United States) Brandon Triche	(Italy) Acea Roma	37
2	(United States) Dee Brown	(Romania) Asesoft Ploiești	33
3	(United States) Brandon Triche (2)	(Italy) Acea Roma	27
4	(Bulgaria) Darius Adams	(France) Nancy	36
5	(United States Virgin Islands) Walter Hodge	(Russia) Zenit	34
6	(North Macedonia) Romeo Travis	(Russia) Krasny Oktyabr	34
7	(Italy) Achille Polonara	(Italy) Grissin Bon Reggio Emilia	34
7	(North Macedonia) Romeo Travis (2)	(Russia) Krasny Oktyabr	34
8	(Spain) Willy Hernangómez	(Spain) Sevilla	31
9	(United States) Darius Johnson-Odom	(Italy) FoxTown Cantù	40
10	(Serbia) Milan Mačvan	(Serbia) Partizan NIS	34

==== Last 32 ====
Week	Player	Team	PIR
1	(Cape Verde) Walter Tavares	(Spain) Herbalife Gran Canaria	40
2	(United States) Anthony Randolph	(Russia) Lokomotiv Kuban	36
2	(Montenegro) Halil Kanacević	(Slovenia) Union Olimpija	36
3	(Lithuania) Martynas Gecevičius	(Lithuania) Lietuvos Rytas	38
4	(United States) Mardy Collins	(Poland) PGE Turów	40
5	(Poland) Damian Kulig	(Poland) PGE Turów	38
6	(United States) Sharrod Ford	(France) Paris-Levallois	37

==== Eighthfinals ====
Week	Player	Team	PIR
1	(Dominican Republic) Sammy Mejia	(Turkey) Banvit	33
2	(United States) Jon Diebler	(Turkey) Pınar Karşıyaka	31

==== Quarterfinals ====
Week	Player	Team	PIR
1	(Montenegro) Tyrese Rice	(Russia) Khimki	27
1	(Croatia) Krunoslav Simon	(Russia) Lokomotiv Kuban	27
2	(United States) James White	(Russia) UNICS	38

==== Semifinals ====
Week	Player	Team	PIR
1	(Cape Verde) Walter Tavares (2)	(Spain) Herbalife Gran Canaria	30
2	(Montenegro) Tyrese Rice (2)	(Russia) Khimki	22
2	(United States) James Augustine	(Russia) Khimki	22

==== Finals ====
Week	Player	Team	PIR
1	(United States) Paul Davis	(Russia) Khimki	22
2	(United States) James Augustine (2)	(Russia) Khimki	22

=== Eurocup MVP ===
- (Montenegro) Tyrese Rice (Khimki)

=== Eurocup Finals MVP ===
- (Montenegro) Tyrese Rice (Khimki)

=== All-Eurocup Teams ===
Position	All-Eurocup First Team	Club team	All-Eurocup Second Team	Club	Ref
PG	(Montenegro) Tyrese Rice	(Russia) Khimki	(Turkey) Bobby Dixon	(Turkey) Pınar Karşıyaka	
SG/SF	(Finland) Petteri Koponen	(Russia) Khimki	(United States) Keith Langford	(Russia) Unics Kazan	
SG/SF	(Dominican Republic) Sammy Mejia	(Turkey) Banvit	(United States) Kyle Kuric	(Spain) Herbalife Gran Canaria	
PF/C	(United States) Derrick Brown	(Russia) Lokomotiv Kuban	(United States) Anthony Randolph	(Russia) Lokomotiv Kuban	
PF/C	(Cape Verde) Walter Tavares	(Spain) Herbalife Gran Canaria	(United States) Sharrod Ford	(France) Paris-Levallois	

=== Coach of the Year ===
- (Spain) Aíto García Reneses (Herbalife Gran Canaria)

=== Rising Star ===
- (Latvia) Kristaps Porziņģis (Sevilla)

== See also ==
- 2014–15 Euroleague
- 2014–15 EuroChallenge
