= 2015 FIBA Europe Under-20 Championship Division B =

11th Division B Championship

Tournament details
- Host country: Hungary
- Dates: 9–19 July 2015
- Teams: 18
- Venue: 2 (in 1 host city)

Final positions
- Champions: Finland (1st title)

Tournament statistics
- MVP: (Finland) Anton Odabasi

Official website
- FIBA Archive

The 2015 FIBA Europe Under-20 Championship Division B was the 11th edition of the Division B of the FIBA Europe Under-20 Championship, the second-tier level of the European Under-20 basketball championship. The tournament was played in Székesfehérvár, Hungary, from 9 to 19 July 2015.

== Participating teams ==
- Albania
- Armenia
- Austria
- Belarus
- Finland
- Georgia
- Hungary ▼ (20th place, 2014 FIBA Europe Under-20 Championship Division A)
- Kosovo
- Luxembourg
- Macedonia
- Moldova
- Montenegro ▼ (18th place, 2014 FIBA Europe Under-20 Championship Division A)
- Netherlands
- Portugal
- Romania
- Slovakia
- Sweden ▼ (19th place, 2014 FIBA Europe Under-20 Championship Division A)
- Switzerland

== First round ==
In this round, the eighteen teams were allocated in two groups of five teams and two groups of four teams. The top two teams in each group advanced to the Second round. The other teams played in the Classification Games.

=== Group A ===
| Pos | Team | Pld | W | L | PF | PA | PD | Pts | Qualification |
|---|---|---|---|---|---|---|---|---|---|
| 1 | Finland | 3 | 3 | 0 | 242 | 188 | +54 | 6 | Advance to second round |
| 2 | Netherlands | 3 | 2 | 1 | 194 | 178 | +16 | 5 | Advance to second round |
| 3 | Austria | 3 | 1 | 2 | 210 | 224 | −14 | 4 | Classification Group G |
| 4 | Romania | 3 | 0 | 3 | 197 | 253 | −56 | 3 | Classification Group G |

Source: FIBA Archive

9 July 2015
13:30

Boxscore

| Austria | 84–79 | Romania |
Scoring by quarter: 19–17, 17–23, 27–24, 21–15
| Pts: Blažević 19; Rebs: Ogunsipe 9 Asts: Käferle 8 | | Pts: Cobzaru 15; Rebs: Cobzaru 12; Asts: Barbasi 5 |

VOK Education Center, Székesfehérvár (HUN)
Attendance: 100
Referees: Uroš Obrknežević (SRB), Pavel Fuska (SVK), Irakli Berishvili (GEO)

9 July 2015
20:15

Boxscore

| Finland | 68–54 | Netherlands |
Scoring by quarter: 18–14, 6–14, 23–10, 21–16
| Pts: Michelsen 13; Rebs: Odabasi 10; Asts: Hirvonen 8 | | Pts: van Sauers 19; Rebs: Franke 7 Asts: van Sauers 4 |

VOK Education Center, Székesfehérvár (HUN)
Attendance: 100
Referees: Saša Maričić (SRB), Dumitru Stasiev (MDA), Alexander Romanov (RUS)

11 July 2015
13:30

Boxscore

| Netherlands | 60–56 | Austria |
Scoring by quarter: 16–16, 14–9, 19–18, 11–13
| Pts: Franke 24; Rebs: Franke, van Sauers 5 Asts: Franke 4 | | Pts: Ogunsipe 12; Rebs: Blažević 13; Asts: Soldo 4 |

VOK Education Center, Székesfehérvár (HUN)
Attendance: 200
Referees: Milan Adamović (BIH), Michel Glod (LUX), Yury Ihnatsyeu (BLR)

11 July 2015
20:15

Boxscore

| Romania | 64–89 | Finland |
Scoring by quarter: 15–26, 12–21, 20–16, 17–26
| Pts: Cobzaru 14; Rebs: Cobzaru 11; Asts: Barbasi, Dragoste, Pogacean 3 | | Pts: Hopkins, Madsen 14; Rebs: Odabasi 6 Asts: Hirvonen 7 |

Vodafone Sportcentrum, Székesfehérvár (HUN)
Attendance: 60
Referees: Ognjen Jokić (MNE), Sebastien Clivaz (SUI), Dumitru Stasiev (MDA)

13 July 2015
15:45

Boxscore

| Austria | 70–85 | Finland |
Scoring by quarter: 24–28, 15–26, 9–17, 22–14
| Pts: Moschik 13; Rebs: Blažević 10; Asts: Blažević 6 | | Pts: Madsen 26; Rebs: Michelsen 7 Asts: Hirvonen 5 |

Vodafone Sportcentrum, Székesfehérvár (HUN)
Attendance: 40
Referees: Uroš Obrknežević (SRB), Petar Denkovski (MKD), Erion Hoxhaj (ALB)

13 July 2015
20:15

Boxscore

| Netherlands | 80–54 | Romania |
Scoring by quarter: 17–15, 21–12, 24–14, 18–13
| Pts: Franke 24; Rebs: Hammink, Dijkstra 5 Asts: Dijkhuizen, Franke 3 | | Pts: Barbasi, Pogacean 11; Rebs: Cobzaru 6 Asts: Barbasi 3 |

Vodafone Sportcentrum, Székesfehérvár (HUN)
Attendance: 50
Referees: Wojciech Liszka (POL), Sebastien Clivaz (SUI), Rickard Eriksson (SWE)

=== Group B ===
| Pos | Team | Pld | W | L | PF | PA | PD | Pts | Qualification |
|---|---|---|---|---|---|---|---|---|---|
| 1 | Montenegro | 4 | 4 | 0 | 333 | 224 | +109 | 8 | Advance to second round |
| 2 | Luxembourg | 4 | 3 | 1 | 333 | 284 | +49 | 7 | Advance to second round |
| 3 | Portugal | 4 | 2 | 2 | 237 | 256 | −19 | 6 | Classification Group G |
| 4 | Kosovo | 4 | 1 | 3 | 254 | 315 | −61 | 5 | Classification Group G |
| 5 | Georgia | 4 | 0 | 4 | 254 | 332 | −78 | 4 | Classification Group G |

Source: FIBA Archive

9 July 2015
15:45

Boxscore

| Luxembourg | 62–70 | Montenegro |
Scoring by quarter: 19–25, 17–19, 10–16, 16–10
| Pts: Kalmes 13; Rebs: Vujaković 5 Asts: Gutenkauf 5 | | Pts: Popović 14; Rebs: Nikolić 6 Asts: Šarić 3 |

VOK Education Center, Székesfehérvár (HUN)
Attendance: 100
Referees: Milan Adamović (BIH), Vladyslav Isachenko (UKR), Yury Ihnatsyeu (BLR)

9 July 2015
20:15

Boxscore

| Portugal | 65–50 | Kosovo |
Scoring by quarter: 10–14, 19–10, 19–14, 17–12
| Pts: Da Silva 20; Rebs: Relvao 16; Asts: Gameiro 9 | | Pts: Zekiqi 14; Rebs: Karanezi 11; Asts: Mekaj 6 |

Vodafone Sportcentrum, Székesfehérvár (HUN)
Attendance: 30
Referees: Alin Faur (ROU), Peter Papp (HUN), Paul Skayem (LIB)

10 July 2015
13:30

Boxscore

| Georgia | 75–98 | Luxembourg |
Scoring by quarter: 17–27, 14–27, 21–16, 23–28
| Pts: Tomaradze 19; Rebs: Puluzashvili 11; Asts: Abuladze, Tomaradze, Zakradze, Puluzashvili 2 | | Pts: Grün 26; Rebs: Vujaković 14; Asts: Grün 5 |

Vodafone Sportcentrum, Székesfehérvár (HUN)
Attendance: 20
Referees: Uroš Obrknežević (SRB), Pavel Fuska (SVK), Laszlo Bukuresti (ROU)

10 July 2015
20:15

Boxscore

| Montenegro | 69–48 | Portugal |
Scoring by quarter: 23–12, 20–12, 11–16, 15–8
| Pts: Popović 19; Rebs: Milović 6 Asts: Krivokapić, Šarić, Popović 3 | | Pts: Da Silva 12; Rebs: Lucas 6 Asts: Amiel, Gameiro, Relvao 2 |

Vodafone Sportcentrum, Székesfehérvár (HUN)
Attendance: 50
Referees: Miguel Anguel Perez Niz (ESP), Ventsislav Velikov (BUL), Sebastien Clivaz (SUI)

11 July 2015
15:45

Boxscore

| Portugal | 57–55 | Georgia |
Scoring by quarter: 18–21, 13–14, 13–8, 13–12
| Pts: Meireless 13; Rebs: Rolo, Meireless, Gameiro 9 Asts: Rolo, Amiel, Gameiro 3 | | Pts: Abuladze 16; Rebs: Abuladze 8 Asts: Sanadze 3 |

VOK Education Center, Székesfehérvár (HUN)
Attendance: 100
Referees: Petar Denkovski (MKD), Christoph Rohacky (AUT), Peter Papp (HUN)

11 July 2015
20:15

Boxscore

| Kosovo | 55–94 | Montenegro |
Scoring by quarter: 9–27, 13–26, 16–16, 17–25
| Pts: Mekaj 15; Rebs: Karanezi 4 Asts: Mekaj 5 | | Pts: Radunović 13; Rebs: Hadžibegović 6 Asts: Krivokapić 6 |

VOK Education Center, Székesfehérvár (HUN)
Attendance: 200
Referees: Wojciech Liszka (POL), Laszlo Bukuresti (ROU), Rickard Eriksson (SWE)

12 July 2015
13:30

Boxscore

| Luxembourg | 82–67 | Portugal |
Scoring by quarter: 24–21, 16–20, 22–19, 20–7
| Pts: Grün 22; Rebs: Kauffmann 12; Asts: Kauffmann 4 | | Pts: Gameiro 29; Rebs: Rolo 9 Asts: Gameiro 5 |

Vodafone Sportcentrum, Székesfehérvár (HUN)
Attendance: 50
Referees: Saša Maričić (SRB), Alexander Romanov (RUS), Ventsislav Velikov (BUL)

12 July 2015
20:15

Boxscore

| Georgia | 65–77 | Kosovo |
Scoring by quarter: 15–20, 14–25, 15–17, 21–15
| Pts: Abuladze, Revazashvili 15; Rebs: Revazashvili 10; Asts: Abuladze 5 | | Pts: Zekiqi, Memeti 24; Rebs: Memeti 15; Asts: Mekaj 6 |

Vodafone Sportcentrum, Székesfehérvár (HUN)
Attendance: 30
Referees: Wojciech Liszka (POL), Christoph Rohacky (AUT), Martins Kozlovskis (LAT)

13 July 2015
18:00

Boxscore

| Kosovo | 72–91 | Luxembourg |
Scoring by quarter: 13–20, 12–25, 21–23, 26–23
| Pts: Mekaj 24; Rebs: Karanezi 8 Asts: Mekaj 6 | | Pts: Kalmes 18; Rebs: Vujaković 11; Asts: Wilson, Gutenkauf, Vujaković 5 |

VOK Education Center, Székesfehérvár (HUN)
Attendance: 100
Referees: Pavel Fuska (SVK), Vladyslav Isachenko (UKR), Dumitru Stasiev (MDA)

13 July 2015
18:00

Boxscore

| Montenegro | 100–59 | Georgia |
Scoring by quarter: 35–13, 25–16, 24–17, 16–13
| Pts: Hadžibegović 15; Rebs: Hadžibegović 11; Asts: Raičević 5 | | Pts: Maskhulia 13; Rebs: Revezashvili 8 Asts: Abuladze 3 |

Vodafone Sportcentrum, Székesfehérvár (HUN)
Attendance: 30
Referees: Ventsislav Velikov (BUL), Peter Papp (HUN), Paul Skayem (LIB)

=== Group C ===
| Pos | Team | Pld | W | L | PF | PA | PD | Pts | Qualification |
|---|---|---|---|---|---|---|---|---|---|
| 1 | Macedonia | 3 | 3 | 0 | 231 | 180 | +51 | 6 | Advance to second round |
| 2 | Belarus | 3 | 2 | 1 | 234 | 190 | +44 | 5 | Advance to second round |
| 3 | Armenia | 3 | 1 | 2 | 165 | 226 | −61 | 4 | Classification Group H |
| 4 | Switzerland | 3 | 0 | 3 | 184 | 218 | −34 | 3 | Classification Group H |

Source: FIBA Archive

9 July 2015
13:30

Boxscore

| Armenia | 71–57 | Switzerland |
Scoring by quarter: 23–16, 14–11, 18–7, 16–23
| Pts: Tavakalyan 20; Rebs: Konstantinov 13; Asts: Polukhin 10 | | Pts: Gravet 10; Rebs: Gravet 10; Asts: Verga 4 |

Vodafone Sportcentrum, Székesfehérvár (HUN)
Attendance: 50
Referees: Ognjen Jokić (MNE), Petar Denkovski (MKD), Christoph Rohacky (AUT)

9 July 2015
18:00

Boxscore

| Belarus | 72–77 | Macedonia |
Scoring by quarter: 16–20, 14–15, 25–16, 17–26
| Pts: Beliankou 15; Rebs: Salash 12; Asts: Beliankou 6 | | Pts: Magdevski 22; Rebs: Bakoch 9 Asts: Magdevski 13 |

Vodafone Sportcentrum, Székesfehérvár (HUN)
Attendance: 100
Referees: Ventsislav Velikov (BUL), Erion Hoxhaj (ALB), Rickard Eriksson (SWE)

11 July 2015
13:30

Boxscore

| Macedonia | 81–45 | Armenia |
Scoring by quarter: 23–8, 19–21, 19–10, 20–6
| Pts: Magdevski 30; Rebs: Mekikj, Bakoch 10; Asts: Magdevski 6 | | Pts: Tavakalyan 20; Rebs: Polukhin 8 Asts: Pogosian, Babayan 1 |

Vodafone Sportcentrum, Székesfehérvár (HUN)
Attendance: 20
Referees: Pavel Fuska (SVK), Erion Hoxhaj (ALB), Paul Skayem (LIB)

11 July 2015
18:00

Boxscore

| Switzerland | 64–74 | Belarus |
Scoring by quarter: 16–25, 12–23, 19–10, 17–16
| Pts: Gravet 13; Rebs: Gravet, Louissaint 6 Asts: Anabir 3 | | Pts: Salash 17; Rebs: Salash 10; Asts: Beliankou 5 |

Vodafone Sportcentrum, Székesfehérvár (HUN)
Attendance: 50
Referees: Tomislav Vovk (CRO), Jose Abreu (POR), Milan Nedović (SLO)

13 July 2015
15:45

Boxscore

| Armenia | 49–88 | Belarus |
Scoring by quarter: 13–23, 13–19, 6–26, 17–20
| Pts: Tavakalyan 13; Rebs: Zakharov, Polukhin 8 Asts: Konstantinov, Polukhin 3 | | Pts: Beliankou 19; Rebs: Salash 10; Asts: Rubinshteyn 5 |

VOK Education Center, Székesfehérvár (HUN)
Attendance: 200
Referees: Tomislav Vovk (CRO), Milan Adamović (BIH), Milan Nedović (SLO)

13 July 2015
20:15

Boxscore

| Macedonia | 73–63 | Switzerland |
Scoring by quarter: 19–15, 17–15, 14–16, 23–17
| Pts: Mladenovski 16; Rebs: Bakoch 14; Asts: Srbinovski 5 | | Pts: Louissaint 18; Rebs: Louissaint 10; Asts: Mbala 3 |

VOK Education Center, Székesfehérvár (HUN)
Attendance: 100
Referees: Laszlo Bukuresti (ROU), Christoph Rohacky (AUT), Martins Kozlovskis (LAT)

=== Group D ===
| Pos | Team | Pld | W | L | PF | PA | PD | Pts | Qualification |
|---|---|---|---|---|---|---|---|---|---|
| 1 | Sweden | 4 | 4 | 0 | 339 | 205 | +134 | 8 | Advance to second round |
| 2 | Hungary | 4 | 3 | 1 | 334 | 233 | +101 | 7 | Advance to second round |
| 3 | Slovakia | 4 | 2 | 2 | 342 | 322 | +20 | 6 | Classification Group H |
| 4 | Albania | 4 | 1 | 3 | 250 | 320 | −70 | 5 | Classification Group H |
| 5 | Moldova | 4 | 0 | 4 | 194 | 379 | −185 | 4 | Classification Group H |

Source: FIBA Archive

9 July 2015
15:45

Boxscore

| Slovakia | 62–85 | Sweden |
Scoring by quarter: 19–27, 8–26, 15–18, 20–14
| Pts: Meress 18; Rebs: Belavy 5 Asts: Rozánek 4 | | Pts: Löfberg 26; Rebs: Lindström 8 Asts: Schüberg 5 |

Vodafone Sportcentrum, Székesfehérvár (HUN)
Attendance: 200
Referees: Tomislav Vovk (CRO), Wojciech Liszka (POL), Milan Nedović (SLO)

9 July 2015
18:00

Boxscore

| Hungary | 100–35 | Moldova |
Scoring by quarter: 28–8, 24–5, 23–10, 25–12
| Pts: Perl 16; Rebs: Revesz 16; Asts: Váradi 4 | | Pts: Nesuscii, Lisii 10; Rebs: Lisii 8 Asts: Adamov 4 |

Vodafone Sportcentrum, Székesfehérvár (HUN)
Attendance: 300
Referees: Miguel Anguel Perez Niz (ESP), Martins Kozlovskis (LAT), Michel Glod (LUX)

10 July 2015
15:45

Boxscore

| Albania | 71–89 | Slovakia |
Scoring by quarter: 17–23, 17–21, 19–22, 18–23
| Pts: Ndreko 21; Rebs: Ndreko 7 Asts: Ferra 5 | | Pts: Rozánek 22; Rebs: Meress, Nemcok 6 Asts: Nemcok 8 |

Vodafone Sportcentrum, Székesfehérvár (HUN)
Attendance: 100
Referees: Michel Glod (LUX), Vladyslav Isachenko (UKR), Jose Abreu (POR)

10 July 2015
18:00

Boxscore

| Sweden | 61–52 | Hungary |
Scoring by quarter: 7–14, 18–14, 22–10, 14–14
| Pts: Löfberg 15; Rebs: Löfberg 15; Asts: Schüberg 5 | | Pts: Perl 17; Rebs: Filipovity 7 Asts: Perl 3 |

Vodafone Sportcentrum, Székesfehérvár (HUN)
Attendance: 1000
Referees: Saša Maričić (SRB), Wojciech Liszka (POL), Alexander Romanov (RUS)

11 July 2015
15:45

Boxscore

| Moldova | 41–96 | Sweden |
Scoring by quarter: 18–26, 12–24, 4–30, 7–16
| Pts: Golban 12; Rebs: Golban 5 Asts: Nesuscii 3 | | Pts: Johansson 15; Rebs: Stenhede, Markusson 7 Asts: Hansson 9 |

Vodafone Sportcentrum, Székesfehérvár (HUN)
Attendance: 30
Referees: Alexander Romanov (RUS), Alin Faur (ROU), Martins Kozlovskis (LAT)

11 July 2015
18:00

Boxscore

| Hungary | 81–52 | Albania |
Scoring by quarter: 18–9, 20–12, 25–18, 18–13
| Pts: Perl 28; Rebs: Perl 8 Asts: Nagy, Váradi, Kosa 5 | | Pts: Ndreko 17; Rebs: Taflaj 6 Asts: Ferra 4 |

VOK Education Center, Székesfehérvár (HUN)
Attendance: 200
Referees: Ventsislav Velikov (BUL), Vladyslav Isachenko (UKR), Irakli Berishvili (GEO)

12 July 2015
15:45

Boxscore

| Albania | 77–53 | Moldova |
Scoring by quarter: 18–14, 13–10, 26–13, 20–16
| Pts: Lekndreaj 23; Rebs: Lekndreaj 12; Asts: Shabani 6 | | Pts: Adamov 19; Rebs: Lisii 11; Asts: Statnic 4 |

Vodafone Sportcentrum, Székesfehérvár (HUN)
Attendance: 30
Referees: Milan Adamović (BIH), Michel Glod (LUX), Milan Nedović (SLO)

12 July 2015
18:00

Boxscore

| Slovakia | 85–101 (OT) | Hungary |
Scoring by quarter: 14–19, 22–23, 25–18, 19–20, Overtime: 5–21
| Pts: Nemcok 26; Rebs: Meress 11; Asts: Nemcok 4 | | Pts: Perl 44; Rebs: Filipovity 10; Asts: Revesz, Kosa 2 |

Vodafone Sportcentrum, Székesfehérvár (HUN)
Attendance: 850
Referees: Miguel Anguel Perez Niz (ESP), Uroš Obrknežević (SRB), Ognjen Jokić (MNE)

13 July 2015
13:30

Boxscore

| Moldova | 65–106 | Slovakia |
Scoring by quarter: 18–24, 15–24, 12–23, 20–35
| Pts: Adamov 17; Rebs: Gaicean, Lisii 9 Asts: Statnic 6 | | Pts: Mäsiar 26; Rebs: Milan Vago 6 Asts: Nemcok 9 |

Vodafone Sportcentrum, Székesfehérvár (HUN)
Attendance: 20
Referees: Michel Glod (LUX), Alin Faur (ROU), Irakli Berishvili (GEO)

13 July 2015
13:30

Boxscore

| Sweden | 97–50 | Albania |
Scoring by quarter: 25–14, 22–14, 25–13, 25–9
| Pts: Lindström 19; Rebs: Andersson 8 Asts: Schüberg 5 | | Pts: Taflaj 20; Rebs: Ndreko 10; Asts: Ndreko, Lekndreaj, Ferra, Qeleshi 1 |

VOK Education Center, Székesfehérvár (HUN)
Attendance: 200
Referees: Alexander Romanov (RUS), Jose Abreu (POR), Yury Ihnatsyeu (BLR)

== Second round ==
=== Group E ===
| Pos | Team | Pld | W | L | PF | PA | PD | Pts | Qualification |
|---|---|---|---|---|---|---|---|---|---|
| 1 | Finland | 3 | 3 | 0 | 256 | 202 | +54 | 6 | Advance to Semifinals |
| 2 | Montenegro | 3 | 2 | 1 | 203 | 204 | −1 | 5 | Advance to Semifinals |
| 3 | Netherlands | 3 | 1 | 2 | 195 | 197 | −2 | 4 | 5th – 8th place playoffs |
| 4 | Luxembourg | 3 | 0 | 3 | 206 | 257 | −51 | 3 | 5th – 8th place playoffs |

Source: FIBA Archive

15 July 2015
13:30

Boxscore

| Finland | 101–83 | Luxembourg |
Scoring by quarter: 26–25, 29–29, 20–16, 26–13
| Pts: Hopkins 17; Rebs: Odabasi 14; Asts: Hirvonen 10 | | Pts: Gutenkauf 22; Rebs: Vujaković 7 Asts: Grün 5 |

Vodafone Sportcentrum, Székesfehérvár (HUN)
Attendance: 50
Referees: Saša Maričić (SRB), Tomislav Vovk (CRO), Erion Hoxhaj (ALB)

15 July 2015
15:45

Boxscore

| Netherlands | 55–68 | Montenegro |
Scoring by quarter: 15–24, 11–12, 13–14, 16–18
| Pts: Franke 22; Rebs: van Sauers 4 Asts: van Sauers 4 | | Pts: Popović 14; Rebs: Nikolić 11; Asts: Milović 3 |

Vodafone Sportcentrum, Székesfehérvár (HUN)
Attendance: 50
Referees: Pavel Fuska (SVK), Ventsislav Velikov (BUL), Alexander Romanov (RUS)

16 July 2015
13:30

Boxscore

| Luxembourg | 61–86 | Netherlands |
Scoring by quarter: 15–26, 15–14, 24–22, 7–24
| Pts: Grün 19; Rebs: Vujaković 8 Asts: Grün 3 | | Pts: Franke 27; Rebs: Driessen 8 Asts: Franke 7 |

Vodafone Sportcentrum, Székesfehérvár (HUN)
Attendance: 20
Referees: Ognjen Jokić (MNE), Milan Adamović (BIH), Rickard Eriksson (SWE)

16 July 2015
20:15

Boxscore

| Montenegro | 65–87 | Finland |
Scoring by quarter: 21–31, 10–18, 23–19, 11–19
| Pts: Radunović, Drašković 12; Rebs: Drašković 7 Asts: Popović 3 | | Pts: Odabasi 19; Rebs: Odabasi 11; Asts: Hirvonen 7 |

Vodafone Sportcentrum, Székesfehérvár (HUN)
Attendance: 50
Referees: Miguel Anguel Perez Niz (ESP), Pavel Fuska (SVK), Erion Hoxhaj (ALB)

=== Group F ===
| Pos | Team | Pld | W | L | PF | PA | PD | Pts | Qualification |
|---|---|---|---|---|---|---|---|---|---|
| 1 | Sweden | 3 | 3 | 0 | 207 | 178 | +29 | 6 | Advance to Semifinals |
| 2 | Hungary | 3 | 1 | 2 | 195 | 198 | −3 | 4 (Note: Hungary 3pts / 143:137 (+6) — Hungary-Belarus 80–83, Hungary-Macedonia 63–54) | Advance to Semifinals |
| 3 | Belarus | 3 | 1 | 2 | 220 | 239 | −19 | 4 (Note: Belarus 3pts / 155:157 (−2) — Belarus-Hungary 83–80, Belarus-Macedonia 72–77) | 5th – 8th place playoffs |
| 4 | Macedonia | 3 | 1 | 2 | 192 | 199 | −7 | 4 (Note: Macedonia 3pts / 131:135 (−4) — Macedonia-Hungary 54–63, Macedonia-Belarus 77–72) | 5th – 8th place playoffs |

Source: FIBA Archive
Notes:

15 July 2015
18:00

Boxscore

| Macedonia | 54–63 | Hungary |
Scoring by quarter: 19–15, 13–16, 8–15, 14–17
| Pts: Magdevski 20; Rebs: Bakoch 11; Asts: Magdevski 6 | | Pts: Perl 26; Rebs: Váradi 7 Asts: Perl 4 |

Vodafone Sportcentrum, Székesfehérvár (HUN)
Attendance: 950
Referees: Miguel Anguel Perez Niz (ESP), Wojciech Liszka (POL), Martins Kozlovskis (LAT)

15 July 2015
20:15

Boxscore

| Belarus | 65–82 | Sweden |
Scoring by quarter: 14–19, 14–13, 18–24, 19–26
| Pts: Beliankou 20; Rebs: Kazlou 8 Asts: Rubinshteyn 4 | | Pts: Ramstedt 18; Rebs: Ramstedt 11; Asts: Schüberg 15 |

Vodafone Sportcentrum, Székesfehérvár (HUN)
Attendance: 50
Referees: Uroš Obrknežević (SRB), Ognjen Jokić (MNE), Milan Nedović (SLO)

16 July 2015
15:45

Boxscore

| Sweden | 64–61 | Macedonia |
Scoring by quarter: 18–13, 24–19, 9–15, 13–14
| Pts: Löfberg 22; Rebs: Ramstedt 9 Asts: Schüberg 9 | | Pts: Mladenovski 19; Rebs: Mladenovski 9 Asts: Magdevski 3 |

Vodafone Sportcentrum, Székesfehérvár (HUN)
Attendance: 100
Referees: Alexander Romanov (RUS), Laszlo Bukuresti (ROU), Vladyslav Isachenko (UKR)

16 July 2015
18:00

Boxscore

| Hungary | 80–83 | Belarus |
Scoring by quarter: 20–25, 13–22, 23–20, 24–16
| Pts: Váradi 24; Rebs: Váradi 7 Asts: Perl 11 | | Pts: Salash 23; Rebs: Chumakou 8 Asts: Salash 5 |

Vodafone Sportcentrum, Székesfehérvár (HUN)
Attendance: 1000
Referees: Uroš Obrknežević (SRB), Tomislav Vovk (CRO), Ventsislav Velikov (BUL)

== Classification groups for 9th – 18th places ==
=== Group G ===
| Pos | Team | Pld | W | L | PF | PA | PD | Pts | Qualification |
|---|---|---|---|---|---|---|---|---|---|
| 1 | Portugal | 4 | 3 | 1 | 238 | 219 | +19 | 7 | Match for 9th place |
| 2 | Georgia | 4 | 2 | 2 | 305 | 275 | +30 | 6 | Match for 11th place |
| 3 | Kosovo | 4 | 2 | 2 | 272 | 266 | +6 | 6 | Match for 13th place |
| 4 | Austria | 4 | 2 | 2 | 273 | 300 | −27 | 6 | Match for 15th place |
| 5 | Romania | 4 | 1 | 3 | 281 | 309 | −28 | 5 | Match for 17th place |

Source: FIBA Archive

15 July 2015
13:30

Boxscore

| Kosovo | 81–69 | Romania |
Scoring by quarter: 16–16, 26–16, 14–16, 25–21
| Pts: Zekiqi 21; Rebs: Memeti 12; Asts: Mekaj 10 | | Pts: Oprea 18; Rebs: Oprea, Cobzaru 7 Asts: Barbasi 5 |

VOK Education Center, Székesfehérvár (HUN)
Attendance: 100
Referees: Vladyslav Isachenko (UKR), Rickard Eriksson (SWE), Dumitru Stasiev (MDA)

15 July 2015
15:45

Boxscore

| Austria | 67–91 | Georgia |
Scoring by quarter: 24–19, 12–14, 20–26, 11–32
| Pts: Blažević 16; Rebs: Blažević 8 Asts: Mitchell 4 | | Pts: Maskhulia 21; Rebs: Zakradze, Maskhulia 7 Asts: Zakradze 8 |

VOK Education Center, Székesfehérvár (HUN)
Attendance: 100
Referees: Peter Papp (HUN), Sebastien Clivaz (SUI), Yury Ihnatsyeu (BLR)

16 July 2015
13:30

Boxscore

| Romania | 74–94 | Georgia |
Scoring by quarter: 16–26, 20–20, 19–26, 19–22
| Pts: Barbasi, Ciotlaus 17; Rebs: Cobzaru 7 Asts: Barbasi, Ciotlaus 2 | | Pts: Zakradze 17; Rebs: Turdziladze 10; Asts: Zakradze 6 |

VOK Education Center, Székesfehérvár (HUN)
Attendance: 100
Referees: Peter Papp (HUN), Milan Nedović (SLO), Yury Ihnatsyeu (BLR)

16 July 2015
15:45

Boxscore

| Portugal | 66–55 | Austria |
Scoring by quarter: 17–6, 7–13, 17–23, 25–13
| Pts: Relvao 20; Rebs: Relvao 14; Asts: Amiel 4 | | Pts: Käferle 15; Rebs: Ogunsipe 7 Asts: Mitchell 3 |

VOK Education Center, Székesfehérvár (HUN)
Attendance: 100
Referees: Sebastien Clivaz (SUI), Michel Glod (LUX), Dumitru Stasiev (MDA)

18 July 2015
18:00

Boxscore

| Austria | 67–64 | Kosovo |
Scoring by quarter: 16–14, 16–17, 15–15, 20–18
| Pts: Wolf, Moschik 16; Rebs: Joch 11; Asts: Wolf, Käferle 4 | | Pts: Zekiqi, Memeti 19; Rebs: Memeti 11; Asts: Nushi 4 |

VOK Education Center, Székesfehérvár (HUN)
Attendance: 100
Referees: Jose Abreu (POR), Rickard Eriksson (SWE), Dumitru Stasiev (MDA)

18 July 2015
20:15

Boxscore

| Portugal | 50–59 | Romania |
Scoring by quarter: 17–8, 12–12, 10–21, 11–18
| Pts: Relvao 9 Rebs: Rolo 10; Asts: Amiel 3 | | Pts: Ciotlaus 19; Rebs: Cobzaru 13; Asts: Barbasi 5 |

VOK Education Center, Székesfehérvár (HUN)
Attendance: 50
Referees: Petar Denkovski (MKD), Erion Hoxhaj (ALB), Paul Skayem (LIB)

=== Group H ===
| Pos | Team | Pld | W | L | PF | PA | PD | Pts | Qualification |
|---|---|---|---|---|---|---|---|---|---|
| 1 | Slovakia | 4 | 4 | 0 | 383 | 288 | +95 | 8 | Match for 9th place |
| 2 | Armenia | 4 | 3 | 1 | 317 | 268 | +49 | 7 | Match for 11th place |
| 3 | Switzerland | 4 | 2 | 2 | 282 | 251 | +31 | 6 | Match for 13th place |
| 4 | Albania | 4 | 1 | 3 | 250 | 285 | −35 | 5 | Match for 15th place |
| 5 | Moldova | 4 | 0 | 4 | 219 | 359 | −140 | 4 | Match for 17th place |

Source: FIBA Archive

== 5th – 8th place playoffs ==
18 July 2015
13:30

Boxscore

| Netherlands | 68–47 | Macedonia |
Scoring by quarter: 16–9, 24–11, 14–14, 14–13
| Pts: Franke 19; Rebs: van Sauers 8 Asts: Franke 4 | | Pts: Magdevski 13; Rebs: Mladenovski 13; Asts: 5 players 1 |

Vodafone Sportcentrum, Székesfehérvár (HUN)
Attendance: 20
Referees: Laszlo Bukuresti (ROU), Peter Papp (HUN), Milan Nedović (SLO)

18 July 2015
15:45

Boxscore

| Belarus | 89–60 | Luxembourg |
Scoring by quarter: 22–24, 20–11, 25–11, 22–14
| Pts: Salash, Beliankou 18; Rebs: Salash 19; Asts: Rubinshteyn 9 | | Pts: Heuschling 12; Rebs: Kalmes 6 Asts: Gutenkauf 4 |

Vodafone Sportcentrum, Székesfehérvár (HUN)
Attendance: 20
Referees: Uroš Obrknežević (SRB), Alin Faur (ROU), Vladyslav Isachenko (UKR)

== Semifinals ==
18 July 2015
18:00

Boxscore

| Finland | 69–58 | Hungary |
Scoring by quarter: 17–11, 10–13, 20–14, 22–20
| Pts: Odabasi 27; Rebs: Odabasi 9 Asts: Hirvonen 3 | | Pts: Perl 20; Rebs: Revesz 14; Asts: Perl 3 |

Vodafone Sportcentrum, Székesfehérvár (HUN)
Attendance: 1250
Referees: Saša Marićić (SRB), Pavel Fuska (SVK), Ventsislav Velikov (BUL)

18 July 2015
20:15

Boxscore

| Sweden | 79–50 | Montenegro |
Scoring by quarter: 15–26, 23–5, 17–7, 24–12
| Pts: Lindström 30; Rebs: Ramstedt, Markusson 11; Asts: Schüberg, Ramstedt 3 | | Pts: Baćović 12; Rebs: Drašković 7 Asts: Popović, Drašković 2 |

Vodafone Sportcentrum, Székesfehérvár (HUN)
Attendance: 50
Referees: Miguel Anguel Perez Niz (ESP), Alexander Romanov (RUS), Wojciech Liszka (POL)

== Final classification games ==
=== Match for 17th place ===
19 July 2015
11:15

Boxscore

| Romania | 101–48 | Moldova |
Scoring by quarter: 25–10, 26–10, 23–12, 27–16
| Pts: Ciotlaus 27; Rebs: Ciotlaus 13; Asts: Barbasi, Ciotlaus 5 | | Pts: Adamov 20; Rebs: Guzun 10; Asts: Nesuscii 5 |

VOK Education Center, Székesfehérvár (HUN)
Attendance: 20
Referees: Pavel Fuska (SVK), Erion Hoxhaj (ALB), Paul Skayem (LIB)

=== Match for 15th place ===
19 July 2015
13:30

Boxscore

| Austria | 69–59 | Albania |
Scoring by quarter: 15–12, 17–22, 20–14, 17–11
| Pts: Käferle 20; Rebs: Slišković 9 Asts: Käferle 4 | | Pts: Taflaj 18; Rebs: Pregja 5 Asts: Shabani 5 |

Vodafone Sportcentrum, Székesfehérvár (HUN)
Attendance: 100
Referees: Vladyslav Isachenko (UKR), Sebastien Clivaz (SUI), Yury Ihnatsyeu (BLR)

=== Match for 13th place ===
19 July 2015
15:45

Boxscore

| Kosovo | 59–81 | Switzerland |
Scoring by quarter: 18–25, 12–13, 14–28, 15–15
| Pts: Karanezi 14; Rebs: Memeti 7 Asts: Mekaj 7 | | Pts: Louissaint 20; Rebs: Louissaint 14; Asts: Verga 4 |

VOK Education Center, Székesfehérvár (HUN)
Attendance: 100
Referees: Jose Abreu (POR), Christoph Rohacky (AUT), Irakli Berishvili (GEO)

=== Match for 11th place ===
19 July 2015
18:00

Boxscore

| Georgia | 88–78 | Armenia |
Scoring by quarter: 15–25, 28–14, 16–12, 29–27
| Pts: Maskhulia 19; Rebs: Gamreklidze 11; Asts: Abuladze 5 | | Pts: Konstantinov 23; Rebs: Zakharov 8 Asts: Petrosian 5 |

VOK Education Center, Székesfehérvár (HUN)
Attendance: 30
Referees: Milan Adamović (BIH), Petar Denkovski (MKD), Erion Hoxhaj (ALB)

=== Match for 9th place ===
19 July 2015
11:15

Boxscore

| Portugal | 83–68 | Slovakia |
Scoring by quarter: 22–21, 29–17, 10–17, 22–13
| Pts: Lucas 15; Rebs: Relvao 12; Asts: Amiel 6 | | Pts: Rozánek 20; Rebs: Meress 7 Asts: Hlivak 5 |

Vodafone Sportcentrum, Székesfehérvár (HUN)
Attendance: 40
Referees: Alin Faur (ROU), Milan Nedović (SLO), Dumitru Stasiev (MDA)

=== Match for 7th place ===
19 July 2015
13:30

Boxscore

| Macedonia | 86–75 | Luxembourg |
Scoring by quarter: 25–19, 24–14, 17–20, 20–22
| Pts: Mladenovski 23; Rebs: Mladenovski 13; Asts: Magdevski 6 | | Pts: Vujaković 18; Rebs: Heuschling 7 Asts: Wilson 8 |

Vodafone Sportcentrum, Székesfehérvár (HUN)
Attendance: 30
Referees: Alexander Romanov (RUS), Martins Kozlovskis (LAT), Rickard Eriksson (SWE)

=== Match for 5th place ===
19 July 2015
15:45

Boxscore

| Netherlands | 78–83 (OT) | Belarus |
Scoring by quarter: 16–10, 19–20, 18–19, 16–20, Overtime: 5–5, 4–9
| Pts: Franke 18; Rebs: Dijkstra 10; Asts: Rosenmuller, Hammink 3 | | Pts: Kazlou 19; Rebs: Kazlou 11; Asts: Kazlou, Beliankou 5 |

Vodafone Sportcentrum, Székesfehérvár (HUN)
Attendance: 750
Referees: Uroš Obrknežević (SRB), Wojciech Liszka (POL), Peter Papp (HUN)

=== Bronze medal game ===
19 July 2015
18:00

Boxscore

| Hungary | 68–66 | Montenegro |
Scoring by quarter: 15–23, 14–21, 18–16, 21–6
| Pts: Perl 32; Rebs: Bán, Andrássy, Revesz 4 Asts: Perl 4 | | Pts: Baćović 19; Rebs: Baćović 7 Asts: Popović, Baćović 5 |

Vodafone Sportcentrum, Székesfehérvár (HUN)
Attendance: 1,500
Referees: Miguel Anguel Perez Niz (ESP), Laszlo Bukuresti (ROU), Ventsislav Velikov (BUL)

=== Final ===
19 July 2015
20:15

Boxscore

| Finland | 80–76 | Sweden |
Scoring by quarter: 19–20, 21–18, 17–26, 23–12
| Pts: Hirvonen 25; Rebs: Odabasi 11; Asts: Hirvonen 8 | | Pts: Löfberg 17; Rebs: Markusson 9 Asts: Lindström 6 |

Vodafone Sportcentrum, Székesfehérvár (HUN)
Attendance: 750
Referees: Saša Maričić (SRB), Ognjen Jokić (MNE), Tomislav Vovk (CRO)

== Final standings ==
| Rank | Team | Record |
|---|---|---|
| 1st place, gold medalist(s) | Finland | 7–0 |
| 2nd place, silver medalist(s) | Sweden | 7–1 |
| 3rd place, bronze medalist(s) | Hungary | 5–3 |
| 4th | Montenegro | 5–3 |
| 5th | Belarus | 5–2 |
| 6th | Netherlands | 4–3 |
| 7th | Macedonia | 4–3 |
| 8th | Luxembourg | 3–5 |
| 9th | Portugal | 4–3 |
| 10th | Slovakia | 4–3 |
| 11th | Georgia | 3–4 |
| 12th | Armenia | 3–4 |
| 13th | Switzerland | 3–4 |
| 14th | Kosovo | 2–5 |
| 15th | Austria | 3–4 |
| 16th | Albania | 1–6 |
| 17th | Romania | 2–5 |
| 18th | Moldova | 0–7 |

| Team promoted to the 2016 FIBA U20 European Championship Division A |
