= 2024 FIBA U20 EuroBasket Division B =

International basketball competition

Tournament details
- Host country: Romania
- City: Pitești, Mioveni
- Dates: 12–21 July 2024
- Teams: 21 (from 1 confederation)
- Venue(s): 3 (in 2 host cities)

Final positions
- Champions: Romania (2nd title)
- Runners-up: Ukraine
- Third place: Finland

Tournament statistics
- Games played: 74
- Attendance: 16,787 (227 per game)
- MVP: (Romania) Dragos Lungu
- Top scorer: (Georgia (country)) Giorgi Sulaberidze (19.6 points per game)

Official website
- www.fiba.basketball

The 2024 FIBA U20 EuroBasket Division B was the 18th edition of the Division B of the European basketball championship for men's under-20 national teams. The tournament was played in Pitești and Mioveni, Romania, from 12 to 21 July 2024.

== Participating teams ==
- Albania
- Armenia
- Azerbaijan
- Bulgaria
- Croatia ▼ (14th place, 2023 FIBA U20 European Championship Division A)
- Estonia ▼ (16th place, 2023 FIBA U20 European Championship Division A)
- Finland
- Georgia
- Great Britain
- Hungary
- Ireland
- Kosovo
- Latvia
- Moldova
- Netherlands
- Portugal
- Romania
- Slovakia
- Sweden
- Switzerland
- Ukraine

== First round ==
The draw of the first round was held on 6 February 2024 in Freising, Germany.

In the first round, the teams were drawn into four groups. The first two teams from each group advanced to the quarterfinals; the third and fourth teams advanced to the 9th–16th place playoffs; the other teams continued in the 17th–21st place classification.

All times are local (Eastern European Summer Time – UTC+3).

=== Group A ===
Pos	Team	Pld	W	L	PF	PA	PD	Pts	Qualification
1	Finland	4	4	0	300	249	+51	8	Quarterfinals
2	Slovakia	4	2	2	268	269	−1	6	Quarterfinals
3	Croatia	4	2	2	297	262	+35	6	9th–16th place playoffs
4	Latvia	4	1	3	257	281	−24	5	9th–16th place playoffs
5	Switzerland	4	1	3	235	296	−61	5	17th–21st place classification

Source: FIBA

12 July 2024
15:30

Boxscore

Finland	76–65	Slovakia
Scoring by quarter: 15–12, 20–18, 25–15, 16–20
Pts: Kanden 14; Rebs: Vartiainen 9 Asts: Salmi 4		Pts: Kovacik 14; Rebs: Krajcovic 9 Asts: Kovacik, Luttmerding 3

Sala Sporturilor Mioveni
Attendance: 30
Referees: Alakbar Hasanov (AZE), Xhelal Mumini (KOS), Rúben Györfy (HUN)

12 July 2024
18:00

Boxscore

Croatia	82–48	Switzerland
Scoring by quarter: 20–21, 18–6, 21–9, 23–12
Pts: Bilic 14; Rebs: Bilic 10; Asts: Zanki 4		Pts: Ducommun 14; Rebs: Roman, Ali 6 Asts: Ducommun 3

Sala Sporturilor Mioveni
Attendance: 30
Referees: Kirile Tvauri (GEO), Gilbert Hoxha (ALB), Vlad-Theodor Cotrobas-Dascalu (ROU)

13 July 2024
13:00

Boxscore

Switzerland	60–85	Finland
Scoring by quarter: 16–18, 10–22, 13–25, 21–20
Pts: Ali 9 Rebs: Biku 4 Asts: Rungasamy, Roman 4		Pts: Vartiainen 20; Rebs: Jokela 9 Asts: Salmi 4

Pitești Arena
Attendance: 30
Referees: Mart Uuehendrik (EST), Megaklis - Konstantinos Marinakis (GRE), Aurimas Borusas (LTU)

13 July 2024
15:30

Boxscore

Latvia	70–88	Croatia
Scoring by quarter: 22–23, 17–15, 14–23, 17–27
Pts: Ozers 11; Rebs: Soldatenoks 5 Asts: Egle 5		Pts: Bogdanovic 26; Rebs: Rajaofera 9 Asts: Rajaofera 7

Pitești Arena
Attendance: 50
Referees: Sergii Zashchuk (UKR), Giacomo Dori (ITA), Blazo Begenisic (SWE)

14 July 2024
18:00

Boxscore

Slovakia	65–67 (OT)	Switzerland
Scoring by quarter: 16–17, 12–19, 21–10, 11–14, Overtime: 5–7
Pts: Krajcovic 21; Rebs: Krajcovic 12; Asts: Kovacik 9		Pts: Ducommun 15; Rebs: Boudouma 10; Asts: Rungasamy, Ducommun 5

Sala Sporturilor Pitești
Attendance: 50
Referees: Tijmen Last (NED), Giacomo Dori (ITA), Davit Kikhyan (ARM)

14 July 2024
20:30

Boxscore

Finland	61–57	Latvia
Scoring by quarter: 23–11, 7–15, 11–17, 20–14
Pts: Vartiainen 13; Rebs: Kanden 8 Asts: Salmi 4		Pts: Svitins 17; Rebs: Junemann 9 Asts: Karlsons 6

Sala Sporturilor Pitești
Attendance: 30
Referees: Vladimir Zanev (BUL), Duhan Köyici (TUR), Tomi Panov (MKD)

16 July 2024
15:30

Boxscore

Latvia	66–72	Slovakia
Scoring by quarter: 22–21, 16–20, 14–16, 14–15
Pts: Pinnis 16; Rebs: Berkolds 7 Asts: Berkolds 3		Pts: Hudec 18; Rebs: Koller 8 Asts: Kovacik 5

Pitești Arena
Attendance: 70
Referees: Kyrile Tvauri (GEO), Tiago Roxo Perdigão (POR), Paul Unsworth (GBR)

16 July 2024
20:30

Boxscore

Croatia	67–78	Finland
Scoring by quarter: 19–32, 13–12, 21–21, 14–13
Pts: Bogdanovic 29; Rebs: Zanki 11; Asts: Dundovic 2		Pts: Kanden 20; Rebs: Kanden 9 Asts: Salmi 6

Pitești Arena
Attendance: 100
Referees: Bartłomiej Kucharski (POL), Tijmen Last (NED), Marton Makrai (HUN)

17 July 2024
15:30

Boxscore

Switzerland	60–64	Latvia
Scoring by quarter: 9–18, 20–14, 12–18, 19–14
Pts: Ducommun 13; Rebs: Vuckovic 8 Asts: Boudouma, Ducommun 3		Pts: Berkolds 18; Rebs: Pinnis 11; Asts: Karlsons 5

Sala Sporturilor Mioveni
Attendance: 25
Referees: Vladimir Zanev (BUL), Xhelal Mumini (KOS), Rúben Györfy (HUN)

17 July 2024
18:00

Boxscore

Slovakia	66–60	Croatia
Scoring by quarter: 20–20, 7–14, 28–13, 11–13
Pts: Krajcovic 19; Rebs: Krajcovic 11; Asts: Koller 9		Pts: Sare 18; Rebs: Sare, Dubravcic 11; Asts: Sare 4

Sala Sporturilor Pitești
Attendance: 60
Referees: Sergii Zashchuk (UKR), Mart Uuehendrik (EST), Tomi Panov (MKD)

=== Group B ===
Pos	Team	Pld	W	L	PF	PA	PD	Pts	Qualification
1	Netherlands	4	3	1	326	251	+75	7	Quarterfinals
2	Portugal	4	3	1	315	220	+95	7	Quarterfinals
3	Great Britain	4	2	2	336	309	+27	6	9th–16th place playoffs
4	Ireland	4	2	2	224	267	−43	6	9th–16th place playoffs
5	Azerbaijan	4	0	4	203	357	−154	4	17th–21st place classification

Source: FIBA

12 July 2024
18:00

Boxscore

Great Britain	85–66	Ireland
Scoring by quarter: 22–9, 20–12, 22–20, 21–25
Pts: Davis, Hosten 14; Rebs: Onyia 12; Asts: Lacey 7		Pts: Cronin 17; Rebs: Badejo 11; Asts: Fitzpatrick 10

Sala Sporturilor Pitești
Attendance: 70
Referees: Michail Papaioannou (SUI), Blazo Begenisic (SWE), Marton Makrai (HUN)

12 July 2024
20:30

Boxscore

Portugal	90–34	Azerbaijan
Scoring by quarter: 16–14, 21–3, 27–14, 26–3
Pts: Santos 20; Rebs: Baker 9 Asts: Dias 6		Pts: Ismayilov 10; Rebs: Abbasov 6 Asts: Three players 1

Sala Sporturilor Pitești
Attendance: 30
Referees: Sergii Zashchuk (UKR), Mart Uuehendrik (EST), Giacomo Dori (ITA)

13 July 2024
15:30

Boxscore

Azerbaijan	51–97	Great Britain
Scoring by quarter: 14–31, 16–18, 16–27, 5–21
Pts: Mammadli 13; Rebs: Abbasov 5 Asts: Ismayilov 3		Pts: Joses 21; Rebs: Tokpah 7 Asts: Lacey 8

Sala Sporturilor Mioveni
Attendance: 20
Referees: Teo Miletić (CRO), Tomi Panov (MKD), Vladimir Zanev (BUL)

13 July 2024
18:00

Boxscore

Netherlands	64–62	Portugal
Scoring by quarter: 18–19, 13–17, 16–14, 17–12
Pts: van Eyck 16; Rebs: Van Bussel 14; Asts: Three players 3		Pts: Horta 15; Rebs: Baker 8 Asts: Dias 4

Sala Sporturilor Mioveni
Attendance: 30
Referees: Xhelal Mumini (KOS), Nikola Perlic (CRO), Rúben Györfy (HUN)

14 July 2024
13:00

Boxscore

Ireland	61–58	Azerbaijan
Scoring by quarter: 22–17, 22–7, 11–16, 6–18
Pts: Ogunbare 15; Rebs: Uosis 12; Asts: Cronin 7		Pts: Abbasov 23; Rebs: Abbasov 9 Asts: Ismayilov 6

Pitești Arena
Attendance: 100
Referees: Einars Tukiss (LAT), Lauri Jäämaa (FIN), Jakub Izak (SVK)

14 July 2024
20:30

Boxscore

Great Britain	75–102	Netherlands
Scoring by quarter: 24–29, 21–26, 17–25, 13–22
Pts: Davis 24; Rebs: Lacey, Onyia 7 Asts: Lacey 9		Pts: Van Bussel 19; Rebs: Pikaar 12; Asts: Verhallen 8

Pitești Arena
Attendance: 110
Referees: Kirile Tvauri (GEO), Bartłomiej Kucharski (POL), Gilbert Hoxha (ALB)

16 July 2024
18:00

Boxscore

Portugal	90–79	Great Britain
Scoring by quarter: 20–14, 21–22, 27–17, 22–26
Pts: Santos 37; Rebs: Seixas 12; Asts: Seixas 6		Pts: Davis 23; Rebs: Davis, Onyia 8 Asts: Davis 6

Pitești Arena
Attendance: 75
Referees: Megaklis - Konstantinos Marinakis (GRE), Duhan Köyici (TUR), Davit Kikhyan (ARM)

16 July 2024
18:00

Boxscore

Netherlands	51–54	Ireland
Scoring by quarter: 12–15, 15–9, 16–12, 8–18
Pts: George 13; Rebs: Van Bussel 13; Asts: Metz 6		Pts: Cronin 18; Rebs: Badejo 9 Asts: Fitzpatrick 6

Sala Sporturilor Pitești
Attendance: 80
Referees: Vladimir Zanev (BUL), Teo Miletić (CRO), Tomi Panov (MKD)

17 July 2024
13:00

Boxscore

Azerbaijan	60–109	Netherlands
Scoring by quarter: 6–11, 21–34, 10–27, 23–37
Pts: Mammadov 18; Rebs: Abbasov 11; Asts: Ismayilov, Abbasov 3		Pts: van der Plas 20; Rebs: George 12; Asts: van Eyck, Verhallen 7

Pitești Arena
Attendance: 40
Referees: Duhan Koyici (TUR), Marton Makrai (HUN), Blazo Begenisic (SWE)

17 July 2024
15:30

Boxscore

Ireland	43–73	Portugal
Scoring by quarter: 13–16, 5–22, 15–21, 10–14
Pts: Ogunbare 14; Rebs: Cronin, Ogunbare 9 Asts: Three players 2		Pts: Horta 13; Rebs: Baker 10; Asts: Dias 7

Pitești Arena
Attendance: 70
Referees: Rafiks Misirovs (LAT), Gilbert Hoxha (ALB), Vlad-Theodor Cotrobas-Daskalu (ROU)

=== Group C ===
Pos	Team	Pld	W	L	PF	PA	PD	Pts	Qualification
1	Ukraine	5	4	1	386	294	+92	9	Quarterfinals
2	Hungary	5	4	1	452	296	+156	9	Quarterfinals
3	Sweden	5	4	1	429	286	+143	9	9th–16th place playoffs
4	Kosovo	5	2	3	394	370	+24	7	9th–16th place playoffs
5	Armenia	5	1	4	321	480	−159	6	17th–21st place classification
6	Moldova	5	0	5	249	505	−256	5	17th–21st place classification

Source: FIBA

12 July 2024
13:00

Boxscore

Kosovo	61–81	Hungary
Scoring by quarter: 20–16, 19–16, 15–25, 7–24
Pts: Ismajli 19; Rebs: Istrefi 8 Asts: Ismajli 4		Pts: Csendes 19; Rebs: Hajdu 9 Asts: Meszlenyi 8

Pitești Arena
Attendance: 20
Referees: Rafiks Misirovs (LAT), Gavin Williams (GBR), Tiago Roxo Perdigão (POR)

12 July 2024
15:30

Boxscore

Moldova	35–114	Sweden
Scoring by quarter: 4–33, 7–27, 10–27, 14–27
Pts: Lavric 10; Rebs: Iastremschi 10; Asts: Borta 4		Pts: Andersson, Garcia Adsten 16; Rebs: Johansson 8 Asts: Andersson 12

Sala Sporturilor Pitești
Attendance: 40
Referees: Duhan Köyici (TUR), Bartłomiej Kucharski (POL), Aurimas Borusas (LTU)

12 July 2024
15:30

Boxscore

Armenia	60–93	Ukraine
Scoring by quarter: 17–23, 10–24, 24–21, 9–25
Pts: Y. Melikyan 17; Rebs: Y. Melikyan 16; Asts: Y. Melikyan 5		Pts: Skutyelnik, Karasov 14; Rebs: Three players 8 Asts: Velychko 5

Pitești Arena
Attendance: 30
Referees: Nikola Perlic (CRO), Vladimir Zanev (BUL), Lauri Jäämaa (FIN)

13 July 2024
15:30

Boxscore

Hungary	106–49	Armenia
Scoring by quarter: 32–16, 26–5, 24–13, 24–15
Pts: Meszlenyi, Hajdu 14; Rebs: Kaye 9 Asts: Csendes 7		Pts: K. Melikyan 11; Rebs: Y. Melikyan 15; Asts: A. Gevorgyan 3

Sala Sporturilor Pitești
Attendance: 50
Referees: Gilbert Hoxha (ALB), Michail Papaioannou (SUI), Jakub Izak (SVK)

13 July 2024
20:30

Boxscore

Sweden	85–53	Kosovo
Scoring by quarter: 14–12, 16–16, 28–7, 27–18
Pts: Garcia Adsten 26; Rebs: Garcia Adsten 10; Asts: Andersson 10		Pts: Dahsyla, Peci 11; Rebs: Ukaj 6 Asts: Binqe 3

Pitești Arena
Attendance: 20
Referees: Paul Unsworth (GBR), Alakbar Hasanov (AZE), Tijmen Last (NED)

13 July 2024
20:30

Boxscore

Ukraine	83–48	Moldova
Scoring by quarter: 20–14, 17–18, 19–6, 27–10
Pts: Klitschko 17; Rebs: Sypalo 15; Asts: Kolawole, Nikolaichuk 5		Pts: Iastremschi 14; Rebs: Sorochin 7 Asts: Macaru 4

Sala Sporturilor Pitești
Attendance: 50
Referees: Kirile Tvauri (GEO), Gavin Williams (GBR), Einars Tukiss (LAT)

14 July 2024
15:30

Boxscore

Ukraine	62–63	Sweden
Scoring by quarter: 18–16, 14–17, 8–20, 22–10
Pts: Sypalo 17; Rebs: Kholod 12; Asts: Skutyelnik 4		Pts: Andersson 22; Rebs: Andersson, Garcia Adsten 9 Asts: Andersson 7

Pitești Arena
Attendance: 150
Referees: Megaklis - Konstantinos Marinakis (GRE), Teo Miletić (CRO), Rafiks Misirovs (LAT)

14 July 2024
15:30

Boxscore

Moldova	33–112	Hungary
Scoring by quarter: 10–31, 5–27, 9–31, 9–23
Pts: Macaru 13; Rebs: Voitenco, Tarlev 5 Asts: Borta 2		Pts: Meszlenyi 20; Rebs: Reizinger 8 Asts: Halmai 9

Sala Sporturilor Mioveni
Attendance: 20
Referees: Paul Unsworth (GBR), Samu Turunen (FIN), Alakbar Hasanov (AZE)

14 July 2024
18:00

Boxscore

Armenia	75–115	Kosovo
Scoring by quarter: 19–30, 19–32, 21–25, 16–28
Pts: Y. Melikyan 24; Rebs: Y. Melikyan 18; Asts: Mkrtumyan 5		Pts: Dahsyla 27; Rebs: Istrefi 5 Asts: Ismajli 6

Sala Sporturilor Mioveni
Attendance: 10
Referees: Mart Uuehendrik (EST), Aurimas Borusas (LTU), Vlad-Theodor Cotrobas-Dascalu (ROU)

16 July 2024
13:00

Boxscore

Kosovo	115–62	Moldova
Scoring by quarter: 24–14, 23–25, 29–17, 39–6
Pts: Istrefi 20; Rebs: Istrefi 11; Asts: Gashi, Ismajli 4		Pts: Macaru 24; Rebs: Iastremschi 13; Asts: Three players 2

Pitești Arena
Attendance: 20
Referees: Nikola Perlic (CRO), Gilbert Hoxha (ALB), Lauri Jäämaa (FIN)

16 July 2024
15:30

Boxscore

Sweden	95–56	Armenia
Scoring by quarter: 17–16, 24–20, 28–7, 26–13
Pts: Holmstrom Riddervold 19; Rebs: Stumer 9 Asts: Holmstrom Riddervold, Gyllebring 6		Pts: A. Gevorgyan 15; Rebs: Y. Melikyan 17; Asts: K. Melikyan 4

Sala Sporturilor Pitești
Attendance: 20
Referees: Einars Tukiss (LAT), Samu Turunen (FIN), Gavin Williams (GBR)

16 July 2024
20:30

Boxscore

Hungary	73–81	Ukraine
Scoring by quarter: 17–17, 16–17, 20–23, 20–24
Pts: Meszlenyi, Csuti 16; Rebs: Meszlenyi 8 Asts: Meszlenyi, Halmai 5		Pts: Skutyelnik, Sypalo 15; Rebs: Sypalo 16; Asts: Kabanov 6

Sala Sporturilor Pitești
Attendance: 50
Referees: Mart Uuehendrik (EST), Giacomo Dori (ITA), Vlad-Theodor Cotrobas-Dascalu (ROU)

17 July 2024
18:00

Boxscore

Moldova	71–81	Armenia
Scoring by quarter: 18–17, 27–24, 11–25, 15–15
Pts: Borta 19; Rebs: Iastremschi 9 Asts: Macaru, Iastremschi 5		Pts: A. Gevorgyan 27; Rebs: Y. Melikyan 14; Asts: Five players 2

Sala Sporturilor Mioveni
Attendance: 15
Referees: Nikola Perlic (CRO), Kirile Tvauri (GEO), Lauri Jäämaa (FIN)

17 July 2024
20:30

Boxscore

Hungary	80–72	Sweden
Scoring by quarter: 16–25, 27–7, 13–25, 24–15
Pts: Csuti 16; Rebs: Hajdu 7 Asts: Halmai 4		Pts: Johansson 18; Rebs: Garcia Adsten 13; Asts: Andersson 8

Pitești Arena
Attendance: 70
Referees: Megaklis - Konstantinos Marinakis (GRE), Tiago Roxo Perdigão (POR), Teo Miletić (CRO)

17 July 2024
20:30

Boxscore

Ukraine	67–50	Kosovo
Scoring by quarter: 14–9, 22–11, 13–13, 18–17
Pts: Skutyelnik, Sypalo 14; Rebs: Sypalo 13; Asts: Chornohrytskyi, Novikov 3		Pts: Dahsyla 13; Rebs: Three players 8 Asts: Dahsyla, Peci 3

Sala Sporturilor Pitești
Attendance: 75
Referees: Bartłomiej Kucharski (POL), Michail Papaioannou (SUI), Jakub Izak (SVK)

=== Group D ===
Pos	Team	Pld	W	L	PF	PA	PD	Pts	Qualification
1	Romania	4	4	0	331	271	+60	8	Quarterfinals
2	Georgia	4	3	1	358	301	+57	7	Quarterfinals
3	Estonia	4	2	2	277	307	−30	6	9th–16th place playoffs
4	Bulgaria	4	1	3	326	293	+33	5	9th–16th place playoffs
5	Albania	4	0	4	234	354	−120	4	17th–21st place classification

Source: FIBA

12 July 2024
18:00

Boxscore

Estonia	70–73	Romania
Scoring by quarter: 19–19, 16–9, 15–19, 20–26
Pts: Saadi 22; Rebs: Poom 9 Asts: Aav, Valb 3		Pts: Lungu 20; Rebs: Oinaru 10; Asts: Somacescu, Oinaru 2

Pitești Arena
Attendance: 1,000
Referees: Einars Tukiss (LAT), Teo Miletić (CRO), Megaklis - Konstantinos Marinakis (GRE)

12 July 2024
20:30

Boxscore

Georgia	97–71	Albania
Scoring by quarter: 22–15, 20–19, 31–9, 24–28
Pts: Berekashvili 14; Rebs: Bakhtadze 8 Asts: Alavidze 7		Pts: Begaj 17; Rebs: Gjecaj, Jareci 7 Asts: Gjecaj 4

Pitești Arena
Attendance: 35
Referees: Tijmen Last (NED), Paul Unsworth (GBR), Tomi Panov (MKD)

13 July 2024
18:00

Boxscore

Bulgaria	65–67	Estonia
Scoring by quarter: 14–25, 17–14, 16–12, 18–16
Pts: Popov, Mihov 13; Rebs: Popov 7 Asts: Pishtikov, Bachkov 2		Pts: Andre 14; Rebs: Poom 11; Asts: Aav 3

Sala Sporturilor Pitești
Attendance: 90
Referees: Bartłomiej Kucharski (POL), Marton Makrai (HUN), Davit Kikhyan (ARM)

13 July 2024
18:00

Boxscore

Romania	86–76	Georgia
Scoring by quarter: 23–17, 20–24, 24–19, 19–16
Pts: Somacescu 21; Rebs: Lungu 13; Asts: Badalau 6		Pts: Sulaberidze 17; Rebs: Berekashvili, Gachechiladze 7 Asts: Ochkhikidze 4

Pitești Arena
Attendance: 700
Referees: Duhan Köyici (TUR), Rafiks Misirovs (LAT), Samu Turunen (FIN)

14 July 2024
15:30

Boxscore

Georgia	88–84	Bulgaria
Scoring by quarter: 21–22, 22–22, 21–20, 24–20
Pts: Sulaberidze 22; Rebs: Sulaberidze 20; Asts: Ochkhikidze 6		Pts: Mihov 29; Rebs: Bachkov 8 Asts: Mihov 4

Sala Sporturilor Pitești
Attendance: 70
Referees: Nikola Perlic (CRO), Blazo Begenisic (SWE), Tiago Roxo Perdigão (POR)

14 July 2024
18:00

Boxscore

Albania	44–81	Romania
Scoring by quarter: 18–15, 12–20, 2–19, 12–27
Pts: Nika 8 Rebs: Jareci 8 Asts: Cokaj, Paloka 2		Pts: Lungu 19; Rebs: Lungu 10; Asts: Lapuste 4

Pitești Arena
Attendance: 1,200
Referees: Sergii Zashchuk (UKR), Michail Papaioannou (SUI), Rúben Györfy (HUN)

16 July 2024
15:30

Boxscore

Estonia	60–97	Georgia
Scoring by quarter: 18–24, 11–17, 15–25, 16–31
Pts: Roos, Tassa 11; Rebs: Poom 6 Asts: Roos 4		Pts: Sulaberidze 21; Rebs: Sulaberitze 12; Asts: Ochkhikidze 7

Sala Sporturilor Mioveni
Attendance: 40
Referees: Sergii Zashchuk (UKR), Jakub Izak (SVK), Michail Papaioannou (SUI)

16 July 2024
18:00

Boxscore

Bulgaria	96–47	Albania
Scoring by quarter: 20–13, 24–10, 24–7, 28–17
Pts: Three players 14; Rebs: Mihov 6 Asts: Kadiev, Dimitrov 6		Pts: Begaj 13; Rebs: Gjecaj, Jareci 7 Asts: Nika, Gjecaj 2

Sala Sporturilor Mioveni
Attendance: 30
Referees: Xhelal Mumini (KOS), Rafiks Misirovs (LAT), Blazo Begenisic (SWE)

17 July 2024
15:30

Boxscore

Albania	72–80	Estonia
Scoring by quarter: 16–30, 14–18, 14–17, 28–15
Pts: Nika 22; Rebs: Nika 9 Asts: Roci 4		Pts: Tassa 20; Rebs: Andre, Poom 8 Asts: Roos 7

Sala Sporturilor Pitești
Attendance: 50
Referees: Giacomo Dori (ITA), Samu Turunen (FIN), Davit Kikhyan (ARM)

17 July 2024
18:00

Boxscore

Romania	91–81	Bulgaria
Scoring by quarter: 20–26, 23–23, 30–17, 18–15
Pts: Badalau 25; Rebs: Lungu 7 Asts: Somacescu 4		Pts: Pishtikov 25; Rebs: Mihov, Bachkov 7 Asts: Petrov 4

Pitești Arena
Attendance: 400
Referees: Aurimas Borusas (LTU), Tijmen Last (NED), Gavin Williams (GBR)

== 17th–21st place classification ==
=== Group E ===
Pos	Team	Pld	W	L	PF	PA	PD	Pts	Qualification
1	Albania	2	2	0	192	116	+76	4	17th place match
2	Armenia	2	1	1	153	159	−6	3	19th place match
3	Moldova	2	0	2	115	185	−70	2	21st place

Source: FIBA

19 July 2024
15:30

Boxscore

Moldova	44–104	Albania
Scoring by quarter: 7–29, 17–22, 13–29, 7–24
Pts: Ormanji 12; Rebs: Lavric 6 Asts: Borta 4		Pts: Jareci 18; Rebs: Cokaj 11; Asts: Roci 6

Sala Sporturilor Pitesti
Attendance: 40
Referees: Blazo Begenisic (SWE), Gavin Williams (GBR), Samu Turunen (FIN)

20 July 2024
18:00

Boxscore

Albania	88–72 (OT)	Armenia
Scoring by quarter: 17–12, 20–17, 14–23, 18–17, Overtime: 19–3
Pts: Nika 27; Rebs: Nika 11; Asts: Roci 4		Pts: Mkrtumyan 22; Rebs: Y. Melikyan 18; Asts: A. Gevorgyan 3

Sala Sporturilor Pitesti
Attendance: 30
Referees: Mart Uuehendrik (EST), Marton Makrai (HUN), Rúben Györfy (HUN)

=== 17th–20th place semifinal ===
Pos	Team	Pld	W	L	PF	PA	PD	Pts	Qualification
1	Switzerland	1	1	0	101	40	+61	2	17th place match
2	Azerbaijan	1	0	1	40	101	−61	1	19th place match

Source: FIBA

19 July 2024
18:00

Boxscore

Switzerland	101–40	Azerbaijan
Scoring by quarter: 22–8, 25–15, 21–6, 33–11
Pts: Roman 20; Rebs: Ducommun 8 Asts: Rungasamy 7		Pts: Abbasov 12; Rebs: Abbasov 5 Asts: Mammadov 4

Sala Sporturilor Pitesti
Attendance: 40
Referees: Paul Unsworth (GBR), Giacomo Dori (ITA), Lauri Jäämaa (FIN)

=== 19th place match ===
21 July 2024
13:00

Boxscore

Azerbaijan	61–71	Armenia
Scoring by quarter: 17–19, 13–13, 14–19, 17–20
Pts: Abbasov 18; Rebs: Abbasov 8 Asts: Ismayilov 4		Pts: A. Gevorgyan 17; Rebs: Y. Melikyan 21; Asts: Mkrtumyan 6

Sala Sporturilor Pitesti
Attendance: 35
Referees: Nikola Perlic (CRO), Vladimir Zanev (BUL), Tiago Roxo Perdigão (POR)

=== 17th place match ===
21 July 2024
15:30

Boxscore

Switzerland	94–51	Albania
Scoring by quarter: 31–8, 15–9, 19–20, 29–14
Pts: Ducommun 15; Rebs: Boudouma 8 Asts: Johnson, Ducommun 4		Pts: Begaj 12; Rebs: Nika 8 Asts: Nika 4

Sala Sporturilor Pitesti
Attendance: 50
Referees: Bartłomiej Kucharski (POL), Blazo Begenisic (SWE), Davit Kikhyan (ARM)

== 9th–16th place playoffs ==
13th place match
Ireland	48
Latvia	58
15th place match
Kosovo	63
Sweden	73

13th–16th place semifinals
Ireland	71
Kosovo	53
Latvia	69
Sweden	45

9th–16th place quarterfinals
A3	Croatia	79
B4	Ireland	48
D3	Estonia	69
C4	Kosovo	60
B3	Great Britain	82
A4	Latvia	70
C3	Sweden	74
D4	Bulgaria	81

9th–12th place semifinals
Croatia	76
Estonia	42
Great Britain	63
Bulgaria	72

9th place match
Croatia	60
Bulgaria	71
11th place match
Estonia (OT)	84
Great Britain	83

=== 9th–16th place quarterfinals ===
19 July 2024
13:00

Boxscore

Croatia	79–48	Ireland
Scoring by quarter: 20–7, 18–13, 25–19, 16–9
Pts: Bart, Zanki 16; Rebs: Njegovan 9 Asts: Rajaofera 8		Pts: Ogunbare 11; Rebs: Ogunbare 15; Asts: Fitzpatrick 2

Sala Sporturilor Mioveni
Attendance: 75
Referees: Rafiks Misirovs (LAT), Marton Makrai (HUN), Tomi Panov (MKD)

19 July 2024
15:30

Boxscore

Estonia	69–60	Kosovo
Scoring by quarter: 22–14, 15–15, 17–10, 15–21
Pts: Jurtsenko 22; Rebs: Poom 12; Asts: Valb 7		Pts: Istrefi 18; Rebs: Dahsyla 11; Asts: Ismajli 7

Sala Sporturilor Mioveni
Attendance: 75
Referees: Bartłomiej Kucharski (POL), Vlad-Theodor Cotrobas-Dascalu (ROU), Davit Kikhyan (ARM)

19 July 2024
18:00

Boxscore

Great Britain	82–70	Latvia
Scoring by quarter: 19–16, 21–21, 19–14, 23–19
Pts: Davis 22; Rebs: Lacey 9 Asts: Lacey 13		Pts: Soldatenoks 16; Rebs: Pinnis 16; Asts: Karlsons 10

Sala Sporturilor Mioveni
Attendance: 20
Referees: Tijmen Last (NED), Xhelal Mumini (KOS), Teo Miletić (CRO)

19 July 2024
20:30

Boxscore

Sweden	74–81	Bulgaria
Scoring by quarter: 14–9, 21–24, 16–19, 23–29
Pts: Holmstrom Riddervold 20; Rebs: Garcia Adsten 10; Asts: Andersson 8		Pts: Pishtikov 24; Rebs: Popov, Bachkov 6 Asts: Pishtikov, Bachkov 4

Sala Sporturilor Mioveni
Attendance: 20
Referees: Megaklis - Konstantinos Marinakis (GRE), Gilbert Hoxha (ALB), Rúben Györfy (HUN)

=== 13th–16th place semifinals ===
20 July 2024
13:00

Boxscore

Ireland	71–53	Kosovo
Scoring by quarter: 24–5, 18–16, 17–20, 12–12
Pts: Ogunbare 18; Rebs: Ogunbare 12; Asts: Cronin 7		Pts: Peci 15; Rebs: Peci 8 Asts: Peci 4

Sala Sporturilor Mioveni
Attendance: 50
Referees: Kirile Tvauri (GEO), Samu Turunen (FIN), Davit Kikhyan (ARM)

20 July 2024
15:30

Boxscore

Latvia	69–45	Sweden
Scoring by quarter: 17–2, 22–12, 13–16, 17–15
Pts: Ozers 16; Rebs: Pinnis 15; Asts: Egle 7		Pts: Johansson 10; Rebs: Hallberg 9 Asts: Andersson 8

Sala Sporturilor Mioveni
Attendance: 70
Referees: Michail Papaioannou (SUI), Jakub Izak (SVK), Gavin Williams (GBR)

=== 15th place match ===
21 July 2024
11:00

Boxscore

Kosovo	63–73	Sweden
Scoring by quarter: 14–22, 15–23, 18–16, 16–12
Pts: Ismajli 14; Rebs: Istrefi 8 Asts: Ismajli 8		Pts: Holmstrom Riddervold 21; Rebs: Andersson 9 Asts: Andersson 10

Sala Sporturilor Mioveni
Attendance: 20
Referees: Aurimas Borusas (LTU), Giacomo Dori (ITA), Marton Makrai (HUN)

=== 13th place match ===
21 July 2024
13:30

Boxscore

Ireland	48–58	Latvia
Scoring by quarter: 15–20, 13–14, 12–14, 8–10
Pts: Ogunbare 12; Rebs: Uosis 11; Asts: Fitzpatrick 4		Pts: Berkolds 16; Rebs: Pinnis 13; Asts: Karlsons 12

Sala Sporturilor Mioveni
Attendance: 20
Referees: Mart Uuehendrik (EST), Gilbert Hoxha (ALB), Tomi Panov (MKD)

=== 9th–12th place semifinals ===
20 July 2024
18:00

Boxscore

Croatia	76–42	Estonia
Scoring by quarter: 20–13, 17–7, 19–12, 20–10
Pts: Dundovic 19; Rebs: Three players 6 Asts: Sare 7		Pts: Saadi 13; Rebs: Poom 8 Asts: Tassa 3

Sala Sporturilor Mioveni
Attendance: 25
Referees: Tijmen Last (NED), Tiago Roxo Perdigão (POR), Blazo Begenisic (SWE)

20 July 2024
20:30

Boxscore

Great Britain	63–72	Bulgaria
Scoring by quarter: 12–21, 20–18, 16–16, 15–17
Pts: Onyia 18; Rebs: Tokpah 11; Asts: Lacey 11		Pts: Pishtikov 18; Rebs: Bachkov 8 Asts: Kadiev, Mihov 6

Sala Sporturilor Mioveni
Attendance: 30
Referees: Aurimas Borusas (LTU), Lauri Jäämaa (FIN), Tomi Panov (MKD)

=== 11th place match ===
21 July 2024
16:00

Boxscore

Estonia	84–83 (OT)	Great Britain
Scoring by quarter: 25–20, 13–17, 17–24, 18–12, Overtime: 11–10
Pts: Tassa, Andre 18; Rebs: Poom 16; Asts: Poom 6		Pts: Davis 21; Rebs: Cambell Deeble 11; Asts: Lacey 4

Sala Sporturilor Mioveni
Attendance: 40
Referees: Teo Miletić (CRO), Michail Papaioannou (SUI), Xhelal Mumini (KOS)

=== 9th place match ===
21 July 2024
18:30

Boxscore

Croatia	60–71	Bulgaria
Scoring by quarter: 14–11, 19–21, 10–25, 17–14
Pts: Bogdanovic 24; Rebs: Njegovan 16; Asts: Bogdanovic 4		Pts: Pishtikov 20; Rebs: Bachkov 11; Asts: Mihov, Bachkov 3

Sala Sporturilor Mioveni
Attendance: 40
Referees: Giacomo Dori (ITA), Marton Makrai (HUN), Samu Turunen (FIN)

== Championship playoffs ==
5th place match
Hungary	79
Georgia	96
7th place match
Portugal	74
Slovakia	60

5th–8th place semifinals
Portugal	55
Hungary	82
Slovakia	72
Georgia	79

Quarterfinals
A1	Finland	68
B2	Portugal	66
D1	Romania	94
C2	Hungary	62
B1	Netherlands	80
A2	Slovakia	68
C1	Ukraine	85
D2	Georgia	76

Semifinals
Finland	72
Romania	77
Netherlands	58
Ukraine	70

Final
Romania	80
Ukraine	58
3rd place match
Finland	73
Netherlands	56

=== Quarterfinals ===
19 July 2024
13:00

Boxscore

Netherlands	80–68	Slovakia
Scoring by quarter: 19–19, 22–12, 16–18, 23–19
Pts: George, van Eyck 14; Rebs: George 16; Asts: van Eyck 3		Pts: Kovacik 18; Rebs: Kovacik 5 Asts: Koller 8

Pitesti Arena
Attendance: 60
Referees: Vladimir Zanev (BUL), Mart Uuehendrik (EST), Rúben Györfy (HUN)

19 July 2024
15:30

Boxscore

Ukraine	85–76	Georgia
Scoring by quarter: 16–13, 23–16, 28–19, 18–28
Pts: Skutyelnik 18; Rebs: Kholod 9 Asts: Kolawole 5		Pts: Alavidze, Sulaberidze 17; Rebs: Sulaberidze 10; Asts: Ochkhikidze 6

Pitesti Arena
Attendance: 100
Referees: Nikola Perlic (CRO), Einars Tukiss (LAT), Tiago Roxo Perdigão (POR)

19 July 2024
18:00

Boxscore

Romania	94–62	Hungary
Scoring by quarter: 26–14, 22–19, 21–14, 25–15
Pts: Lungu 23; Rebs: Three players 7 Asts: Somacescu 4		Pts: Cseh 17; Rebs: Csendes 9 Asts: Csendes 5

Pitesti Arena
Attendance: 2,000
Referees: Sergii Zashchuk (UKR), Duhan Köyici (TUR), Jakub Izak (SVK)

19 July 2024
20:30

Boxscore

Finland	68–66	Portugal
Scoring by quarter: 22–11, 14–17, 12–21, 20–17
Pts: Salmi 18; Rebs: Filtness 5 Asts: Kanden 4		Pts: Santos 16; Rebs: Seixas 10; Asts: Dias 7

Pitesti Arena
Attendance: 70
Referees: Kirile Tvauri (GEO), Aurimas Borusas (LTU), Michail Papaioannou (SUI)

=== 5th–8th place semifinals ===
20 July 2024
13:00

Boxscore

Slovakia	72–79	Georgia
Scoring by quarter: 17–11, 14–20, 18–20, 23–28
Pts: Krajcovic, Solcansky 13; Rebs: Kovacik 10; Asts: Koller, Kovacik 3		Pts: Sulaberidze 24; Rebs: Sulaberidze 12; Asts: Alavidze 7

Pitesti Arena
Attendance: 50
Referees: Bartłomiej Kucharski (POL), Xhelal Mumini (KOS), Giacomo Dori (ITA)

20 July 2024
15:30

Boxscore

Portugal	55–82	Hungary
Scoring by quarter: 9–16, 23–21, 15–21, 8–24
Pts: Seixas 18; Rebs: Seixas 4 Asts: Victo 5		Pts: Csendes 17; Rebs: Reizinger, Cseh 6 Asts: Csendes 8

Pitesti Arena
Attendance: 150
Referees: Sergii Zashchuk (UKR), Einars Tukiss (LAT), Vlad-Theodor Cotrobas-Dascalu (ROU)

=== 7th place match ===
21 July 2024
13:00

Boxscore

Portugal	74–60	Slovakia
Scoring by quarter: 14–21, 15–15, 20–14, 25–10
Pts: Dionisio, Silva 13; Rebs: Dionisio 7 Asts: Dias 5		Pts: Krajcovic 16; Rebs: Solcansky 6 Asts: Krajcovic 4

Pitesti Arena
Attendance: 60
Referees: Duhan Köyici (TUR), Gavin Williams (GBR), Rúben Györfy (HUN)

=== 5th place match ===
21 July 2024
15:30

Boxscore

Hungary	79–96	Georgia
Scoring by quarter: 22–20, 18–26, 20–23, 19–27
Pts: Csendes, Csuti 13; Rebs: Reizinger 11; Asts: Reizinger, Csendes 5		Pts: Ochkhikidze 27; Rebs: Gachechiladze 14; Asts: Alavidze, Ochkhikidze 5

Pitesti Arena
Attendance: 60
Referees: Rafiks Misirovs (LAT), Megaklis - Konstantinos Marinakis (GRE), Jakub Izak (SVK)

=== Semifinals ===
20 July 2024
18:00

Boxscore

Finland	72–77	Romania
Scoring by quarter: 11–11, 18–15, 29–23, 14–28
Pts: Vartiainen 20; Rebs: Muhonen 10; Asts: Salmi 6		Pts: Lungu 16; Rebs: Badalau 9 Asts: Somacescu 6

Pitesti Arena
Attendance: 2,624
Referees: Nikola Perlic (CRO), Vladimir Zanev (BUL), Rafiks Misirovs (LAT)

20 July 2024
20:30

Boxscore

Netherlands	58–70	Ukraine
Scoring by quarter: 20–14, 13–20, 11–17, 14–19
Pts: George 16; Rebs: George, Pikaar 9 Asts: de Vaal, Pikaar 3		Pts: Kholod 17; Rebs: Sypalo 11; Asts: Sypalo 4

Pitesti Arena
Attendance: 150
Referees: Duhan Köyici (TUR), Teo Miletić (CRO), Megaklis - Konstantinos Marinakis (GRE)

=== 3rd place match ===
21 July 2024
18:00

Boxscore

Finland	73–56	Netherlands
Scoring by quarter: 23–20, 20–8, 15–14, 15–14
Pts: Kanden 17; Rebs: Salmi 9 Asts: Salmi 8		Pts: Van Bussel 13; Rebs: Van Bussel 12; Asts: van Eyck 3

Pitesti Arena
Attendance: 1,000
Referees: Sergii Zashchuk (UKR), Einars Tukiss (LAT), Vlad-Theodor Cotrobas-Dascalu (ROU)

=== Final ===
21 July 2024
20:30

Boxscore

Romania	80–58	Ukraine
Scoring by quarter: 18–12, 25–18, 21–13, 16–15
Pts: Badalau 22; Rebs: Lungu 10; Asts: Somacescu, Lapuste 7		Pts: Karasov 11; Rebs: Sypalo 8 Asts: Velychko 5

Pitesti Arena
Attendance: 4,428
Referees: Tijmen Last (NED), Kirile Tvauri (GEO), Lauri Jäämaa (FIN)

== Final standings ==
Rank	Team	Record
1st place, gold medalist(s)	Romania	7–0
2nd place, silver medalist(s)	Ukraine	6–2
3rd place, bronze medalist(s)	Finland	6–1
4	Netherlands	4–3
5	Georgia	5–2
6	Hungary	5–3
7	Portugal	4–3
8	Slovakia	2–5
9	Bulgaria	4–3
10	Croatia	4–3
11	Estonia	4–3
12	Great Britain	3–4
13	Latvia	3–4
14	Ireland	3–4
15	Sweden	5–3
16	Kosovo	2–6
17	Switzerland	3–3
18	Albania	2–5
19	Armenia	2–5
20	Azerbaijan	0–6
21	Moldova	0–7

Promoted to the 2025 FIBA U20 EuroBasket Division A

== Statistics and awards ==
=== Statistical leaders ===
==== Players ====
Points

Name	PPG
(Georgia (country)) Giorgi Sulaberidze	19.6
(United Kingdom) Latrell Davis	19.5
(Croatia) Ivan Bogdanovic	18.1
(Bulgaria) Iliyan Pishtikov	16.9
(Romania) Dragos Lungu	16.3

Rebounds

Name	RPG
(Armenia) Yura Melikyan	17.0
(Georgia (country)) Giorgi Sulaberidze	10.9
(Ukraine) Daniil Sypalo	10.5
(Latvia) Peteris Pinnis	10.3
(Estonia) Karl Markus Poom	10.0

Assists

Name	APG
(Sweden) Max Andersson	9.0
(United Kingdom) Tyrese Lacey	8.1
(Latvia) Kristofers Karlsons	5.7
(Portugal) Tiago Dias	5.0
(Georgia (country)) Giorgi Ochkhikidze	5.0

Blocks

Name	BPG
(Armenia) Yura Melikyan	2.3
(Bulgaria) Hristo Bachkov	2.1
(Moldova) Maxim Iastremschi	2.0
(Ukraine) Daniil Sypalo	1.8
(Ukraine) Maxim Klitschko	1.6

Steals

Name	SPG
(Hungary) Mate Reizinger	2.9
(Republic of Ireland) Sean Fitzpatrick	2.9
(United Kingdom) Latrell Davis	2.7
(Sweden) Max Andersson	2.6
(United Kingdom) Manie Joses	2.5
(Switzerland) Nilan Rungasamy	2.5

Efficiency

Name	EFFPG
(Armenia) Yura Melikyan	23.1
(Georgia (country)) Giorgi Sulaberidze	21.4
(Ukraine) Daniil Sypalo	19.1
(Romania) Dragos Lungu	18.4
(United Kingdom) Latrell Davis	18.2

==== Teams ====
Points

Team	PPG
Georgia	87.0
Hungary	84.4
Romania	83.1
Great Britain	80.6
Bulgaria	78.6

Rebounds

Team	RPG
Sweden	51.8
Latvia	48.4
Ireland	48.0
Armenia	47.7
Georgia	47.7

Assists

Team	APG
Sweden	23.8
Hungary	23.6
Netherlands	18.7
Great Britain	17.6
Portugal	17.6

Blocks

Team	BPG
Armenia	5.1
Hungary	5.1
Bulgaria	5.0
Sweden	4.6
Croatia	4.3
Ukraine	4.3

Steals

Team	SPG
Hungary	13.9
Switzerland	13.7
Portugal	13.3
Kosovo	11.4
Romania	11.3

Efficiency

Team	EFFPG
Hungary	104.8
Georgia	97.3
Sweden	94.8
Romania	92.3
Croatia	87.4

=== Awards ===
The awards were announced on 21 July 2024.

Award	Player
All-Tournament Team	(Romania) Dragos Lungu
All-Tournament Team	(Romania) Denis Badalau
All-Tournament Team	(Ukraine) Daniil Sypalo
All-Tournament Team	(Finland) Viljami Vartiainen
All-Tournament Team	(Georgia (country)) Giorgi Sulaberidze
Most Valuable Player	(Romania) Dragos Lungu
