= Moldova men's national under-20 basketball team =

National basketball team of Moldova

Moldova
- FIBA zone: FIBA Europe
- National federation: Basketball Federation of Moldova

U20 EuroBasket
- Appearances: None

U20 EuroBasket Division B
- Appearances: 4
- Medals: None

The Moldova men's national under-20 basketball team is a national basketball team of Moldova, administered by the Basketball Federation of Moldova. It represents the country in men's international under-20 basketball competitions.

== FIBA U20 EuroBasket participations ==
Year	Result in Division B
2015	18th
2017	21st
2018	22nd
2024	21st

== See also ==
- Moldova men's national basketball team
- Moldova men's national under-18 basketball team
