= Axel Louissaint =

Swiss basketball player

Lugano Tigers
- Position: Shooting guard / small forward
- League: Swiss Basketball League

Personal information
- Born: 3 January 1996 (age 29); Yverdon-les-Bains, Vaud, Switzerland
- Listed height: 6 ft 6 in (1.98 m)
- Listed weight: 196 lb (89 kg)

Career information
- Playing career: 2015–present

Career history
- 2015–2017: Lugano Tigers
- 2017–2018: Vevey Riviera Basket
- 2018–2019: Coruña
- 2019: CB Clavijo
- 2019–2020: Fribourg Olympic
- 2020–present: Lugano Tigers

Axel Louissaint (born 3 January 1996) is a Swiss professional basketball for Lugano Tigers of Swiss Basketball League, the top tier of basketball in Switzerland.

== Professional career ==
=== Lugano Tigers (2015–2017) ===
Louissaint signed with the Lugano Tigers in 2015 at the age of 18. He made his first professional appearance on 14 February 2015, scoring seven points and grabbing four rebounds. Over his first two years Louissaint appeared in 58 games starting 24.

On 25 April 2017 Louissaint declared for the 2017 NBA draft, being one of 45 international players to do so.

=== Riviera Lakers (2017-2018) ===
Louissaint signed with the Vevey Riviera Basket of Championnat LNA. On week 21, he was selected for the Top 5 of the week.

=== Leyma Coruña (2018–2019) ===
On 23 July 2018 Louissaint signed with Leyma Coruña of LEB Oro.

=== Return to Lugano (2020–present) ===
After spending the 2019-20 season with several Spanish clubs, Louissaint returned to Lugano Tigers on 12 August 2020.

== National team career ==
He has competed for Switzerland through multiple youth national teams, and participated at the 2015 FIBA Europe Under-20 Championship Division B. He was the top scorer of his team and averaged 13.1 points, 7.7 rebounds, 1.4 steals per game.

== Career statistics ==
Legend
GP	Games played	GS	Games started	MPG	Minutes per game
FG%	Field-goal percentage	3P%	3-point field-goal percentage	FT%	Free-throw percentage
RPG	Rebounds per game	APG	Assists per game	SPG	Steals per game
BPG	Blocks per game	PPG	Points per game	PIR	Performance Index Rating
**Bold**	Career high

=== LNA stats ===
Year	Team	GP	GS	MPG	FG%	3P%	FT%	RPG	APG	SPG	BPG	PPG	PIR
2015–16	Lugano Tigers	26	6	19.7	**.324**	**.260**	.458	2.3	.7	.4	**.2**	5.7	7.1
2016–17	Lugano Tigers	**32**	**18**	**24.3**	.311	.255	**.633**	**3.7**	**1.0**	**.6**	.1	**5.9**	**7.7**
Career		58	24	21.8	.319	.257	.356	3.0	.8	.5	.1	5.8	7.3
