= Francisco Amiel =

Portuguese basketball player (born 1996)

No. 2 – Albacete Basket
- Position: Point guard
- League: Segunda FEB

Personal information
- Born: 20 January 1996 (age 30) Lisbon, Portugal
- Listed height: 1.88 m (6 ft 2 in)
- Listed weight: 78 kg (172 lb)

Career information
- College: Colgate University (2016–2019)
- Playing career: 2013–present

Career history
- 2013–2015: Algés
- 2019–2021: Sporting CP
- 2021–2022: Lusitânia Expert
- 2022–2023: Ovarense Basquetebol
- 2024–present: Albacete Basket

Francisco Andrade Amiel (born 20 January 1996) is a Portuguese professional basketball player for Albacete Basket of the Segunda FEB. He played in the United States between 2015 and 2019 for the Colgate Raiders.

== Personal life ==
Amiel was born in Portugal to a Mozambican father and Portuguese mother.
