= Vasilije Baćović =

Montenegrin basketball player

No. 11 – Studentski centar
- Position: Center / power forward
- League: Montenegrin League; ABA League

Personal information
- Born: 11 May 1996 (age 30) Nikšić, FR Yugoslavia
- Listed height: 2.07 m (6 ft 9 in)
- Listed weight: 99 kg (218 lb)

Career information
- NBA draft: 2018: undrafted
- Playing career: 2014–present

Career history
- 2014–present: Budućnost VOLI
- 2017–2018: → Lovćen 1947
- 2018–2019: → Studentski centar
- 2020–present: → Studentski centar

Career highlights
- ABA League Second Division champion (2021); Montenegrin League (2015); 2× Montenegrin Cup (2016, 2024); ABA League Supercup winner (2023)
Medals
Representing Montenegro
Men's basketball
Games of the Small States of Europe
Silver medal – second place	2017 San Marino	National Team

Vasilije Baćović (born 11 May 1996) is a Montenegrin professional basketball player, currently playing as a center and a power forward for Studentski centar of the Montenegrin League and the ABA League.
