= Mihailo Radunović =

Montenegrin basketball player

Terme Olimia
- Position: Forward
- League: Slovenia

Personal information
- Born: March 27, 1996 (age 30) Podgorica, Montenegro, FR Yugoslavia
- Listed height: 2.04 m (6 ft 8 in)

Career information
- NBA draft: 2018: undrafted
- Playing career: 2014–present

Career history
- 2014–2016: Budućnost VOLI
- 2014: → Ulcinj
- 2016–2017: Mornar
- 2017–2018: Lovćen 1947
- 2018–2019: Azuqueca

Career highlights
- Montenegrin League (2015); Montenegrin Cup (2016)

Mihailo Radunović (Serbian Cyrillic: Михаило Радуновић, born 27 March 1996) is a Montenegrin professional basketball player, currently playing as a [Terme Olikia] in the Slovenian League.

He made his debut for Budućnost in the Adriatic League match against Levski in October 2014, and spent a further six weeks of the season playing as a dually registered player for Ulcinj.
