= Ljubomir Mladenovski =

Macedonian basketball player

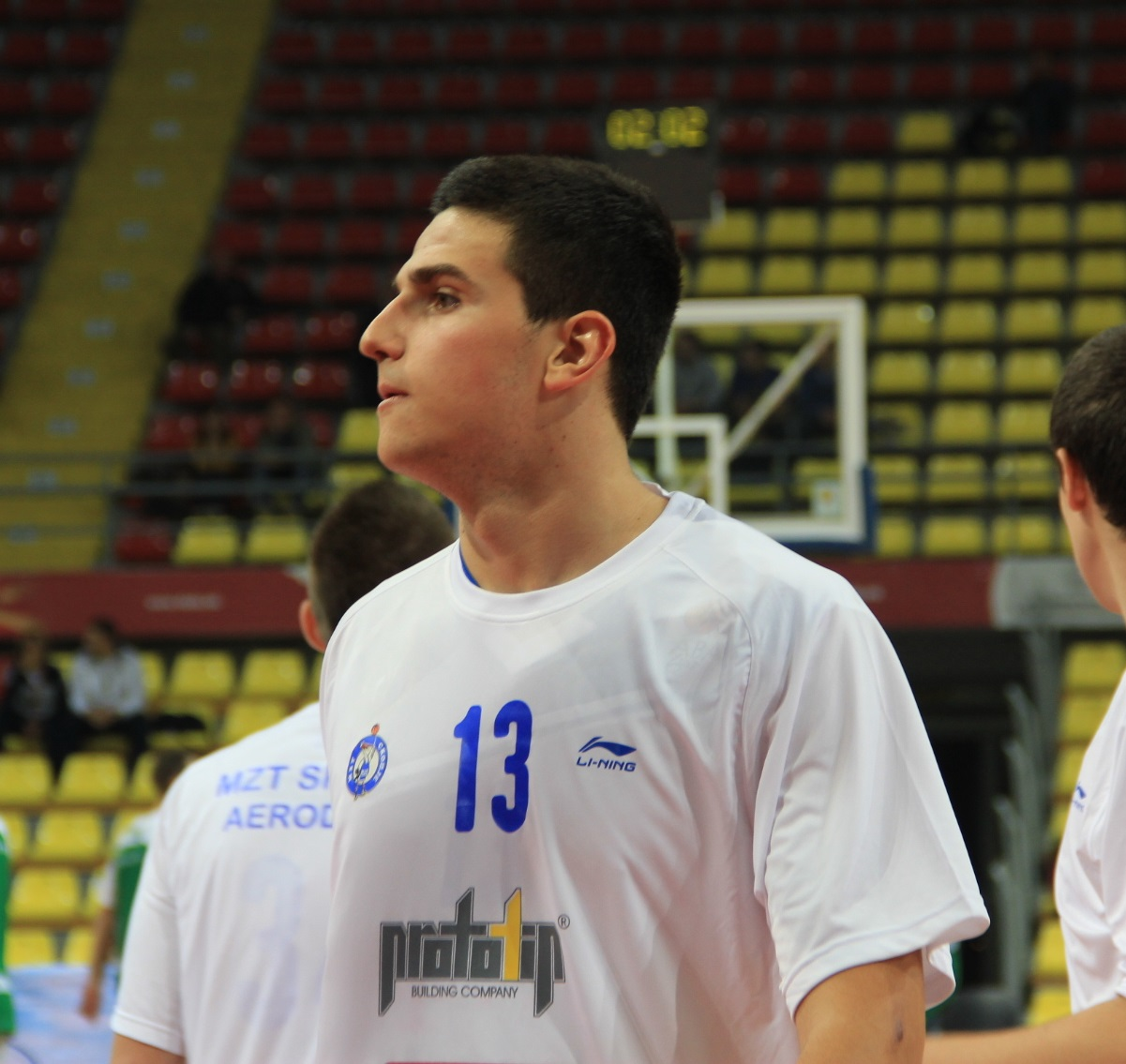
- Mladenovski in 2013

free agent
- Position: Center

Personal information
- Born: May 2, 1995 (age 31) Skopje, Macedonia
- Listed height: 2.10 m (6 ft 11 in)
- Listed weight: 110 kg (243 lb)

Career information
- NBA draft: 2017: undrafted
- Playing career: 2012–present

Career history
- 2012–2013: Rabotnički
- 2013–2017: MZT Skopje
- 2017–2018: Ilirija
- 2018–2019: MZT Skopje
- 2019–2021: Rabotnički
- 2021–2023: Pelister

Career highlights
- 5× Macedonian League (2014–2017, 2019); 2× Macedonian Cup (2014, 2016)

Ljubomir Mladenovski (born May 2, 1995) is a Macedonian professional basketball center who last played for Pelister. He is also member of Macedonia national basketball team.
