= Leonard Mekaj =

Kosovan basketball player

Free agent
- Position: Point guard

Personal information
- Born: February 27, 1995 (age 31) Pejë, FR Yugoslavia
- Listed height: 6 ft 0 in (1.83 m)

Career information
- NBA draft: 2017: undrafted
- Playing career: 2012–present

Career history
- 2012–2015: Sigal Prishtina
- 2014: RTV21
- 2015–2018: Peja
- 2018–2019: Golden Eagle Ylli
- 2019–2020: Rahoveci
- 2020–2021: Peja
- 2021: Golden Eagle Ylli
- 2021–2022: Peja
- 2022–2023: Bora

Career highlights
- Kosovo Superleague champion (2015); Kosovo Cup winner (2013); Balkan League champion (2015); Kosovo Superleague Rookie of the Year (2013)

Leonard Mekaj (born 27 February 1995) is a Kosovan professional basketball player who last played for Bora of the Kosovo Basketball First League.

Leonard Mekaj represented Kosovo in the FIBA Europe Under-20 Championship, where he averaged 13.4 points, 5.9 assists—ranking third in the tournament—and 3.3 rebounds per game. He has also been a member of the senior Kosovo national basketball team.
