= Andrey Konstantinov =

Bulgarian water polo player (born 1943)

Personal information
- Nationality: Bulgarian
- Born: 17 November 1943 (age 81); Sofia, Bulgaria

Sport
- Sport: Water polo

Andrey Konstantinov (Bulgarian: Андрей Константинов; born 17 November 1943) is a Bulgarian water polo player. He competed in the men's tournament at the 1972 Summer Olympics.
