= Diogo Gameiro =

Portuguese professional basketball player

No. 13 – S.L. Benfica
- Position: Point guard
- League: Liga Portuguesa de Basquetebol

Personal information
- Born: 13 August 1995 (age 31) Lisbon, Portugal
- Listed height: 182 cm (6 ft 0 in)

Career information
- Playing career: 2013–present

Career history
- 2013–2016: Benfica
- 2016–2021: CAB Madeira SAD
- 2021–present: Benfica

Diogo Gameiro (born 13 August 1995) is a Portuguese professional basketball player for Benfica and the Portugal national team. He plays as a point guard.

== Club career ==
Gameiro came through the youth system of Benfica and made his senior debut for the Lisbon club between 2013 and 2016.

He then joined CAB Madeira SAD, where he played from 2016 to 2021 and developed into a regular starter.

Gameiro returned to Benfica in 2021. Since rejoining, he has helped the club win three LPB titles, the Portuguese Basketball Cup, the Supertaça, and the Taça Hugo dos Santos.

== International career ==
Gameiro has represented the Portugal men's national team in competitions such as the FIBA EuroBasket 2025 Qualifiers. In the group phase, he averaged 12.0 points, 3.0 rebounds, and 2.0 assists across three games.
