= Julius van Sauers =

Dutch basketball player

No. 2 – Glasgow Rocks
- Position: Small forward
- League: BBL

Personal information
- Born: 1 July 1995 (age 31) Amsterdam, Netherlands
- Listed height: 2.01 m (6 ft 7 in)
- Listed weight: 95 kg (209 lb)

Career information
- College: LIU Brooklyn (2015–2019)
- Playing career: 2012–present

Career history
- 2012–2013: L'Hospitalet
- 2013–2015: Apollo Amsterdam
- 2019–2020: Worcester Wolves
- 2020–present: Glasgow Rocks

Career highlights
- BBL Cup champion (2020)

Julius Clay van Sauers (born 1 July 1995) is a Dutch basketball player for Glasgow Rocks of the British Basketball League (BBL). Van Sauers is the son of the Dutch comedian Eric van Sauers.

== Professional career ==
In the 2012–13 season, Van Sauers played for the junior team of CB L'Hospitalet but played one game for the first squad. He recorded 16 points, 1 rebound and 1 steal in that game.

In 2013–14 he played for his hometown team BC Apollo of the Dutch DBL. He played in 6 games for Amsterdam. In the 2014–15 season, Van Sauers also played for Apollo.

On 17 April 2015, Van Sauers announced that he will be playing for LIU Brooklyn in the 2015–2016 season. He went on to play for LIU in four seasons.

On 1 August 2019, Van Sauers signed with Estonian club Tallinna Kalev of the Korvpalli Meistriliiga (KML).

On 19 September 2019, van Sauers signed with Worcester Wolves of the British Basketball League. With the Wolves he won the 2020 BBL Cup.

On 1 August 2020, Van Sauers signed with Glasgow Rocks.

== National team ==
Van Sauers was a player for the Dutch national basketball team in 2014, when it qualified for the first FIBA EuroBasket tournament in 25 years.

== Honours ==
=== Club ===
Worcester Wolves

- BBL Cup: 2019–20
