= Petar Sarić =

Serbian writer (1937–2023)

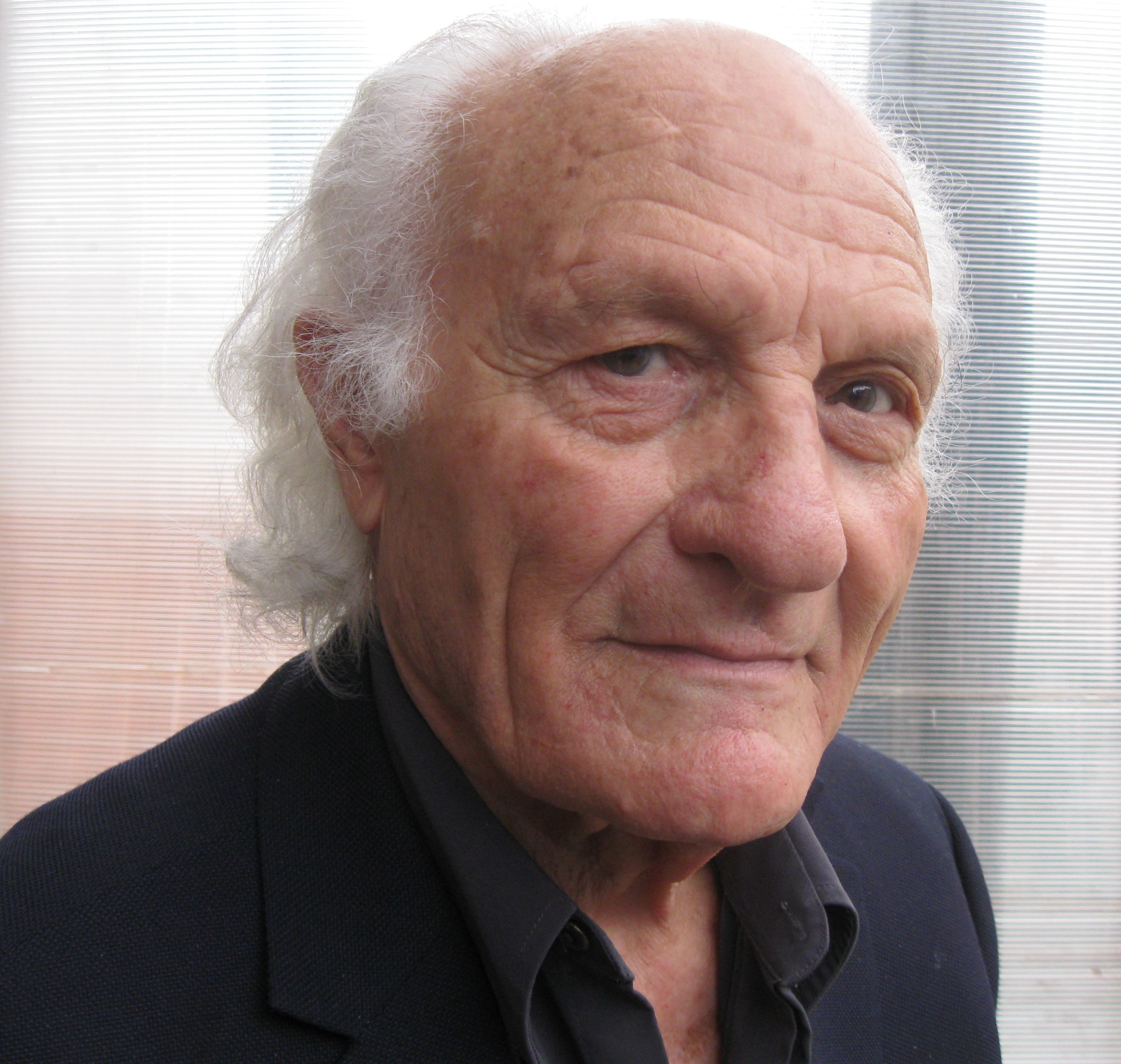
Sarić in 2016

Petar Sarić (Serbian Cyrillic: Петар Сарић; 11 July 1937 – 2 October 2023) was a Serbian poet and prose writer.

== Biography ==
Petar Sarić was born in the village of Tupan, near Nikšić in Montenegro on 11 July 1937. He was a graduate of the University of Priština Faculty of Philology in languages and literature. Upon graduation, he taught in several schools in both Prizren and Rahovec before joining the newspaper staff of the Priština daily Jedinstvo where he later held the post of editor-in-chief for several years. He authored volumes of verse, the first of which was published in the 1970s.

Sarić's best-selling work "Mitrova Amerika" (Mitar's America) is the Serbian literary contribution to the topic of immigration to the New World. He was also a Serbian activist in Kosovo who raised questions when Albanian authorities abused their power.

Petar Sarić died on 2 October 2023, at the age of 86.

== Selected works ==
- Sutra stiže gospodar ("Tomorrow the Lord is Coming" in two volumes, Belgrade, 1979 and 1981)
- Mitrova Amerika ("Mitar's America")
