= Milovan Drašković =

Montenegrin basketball player

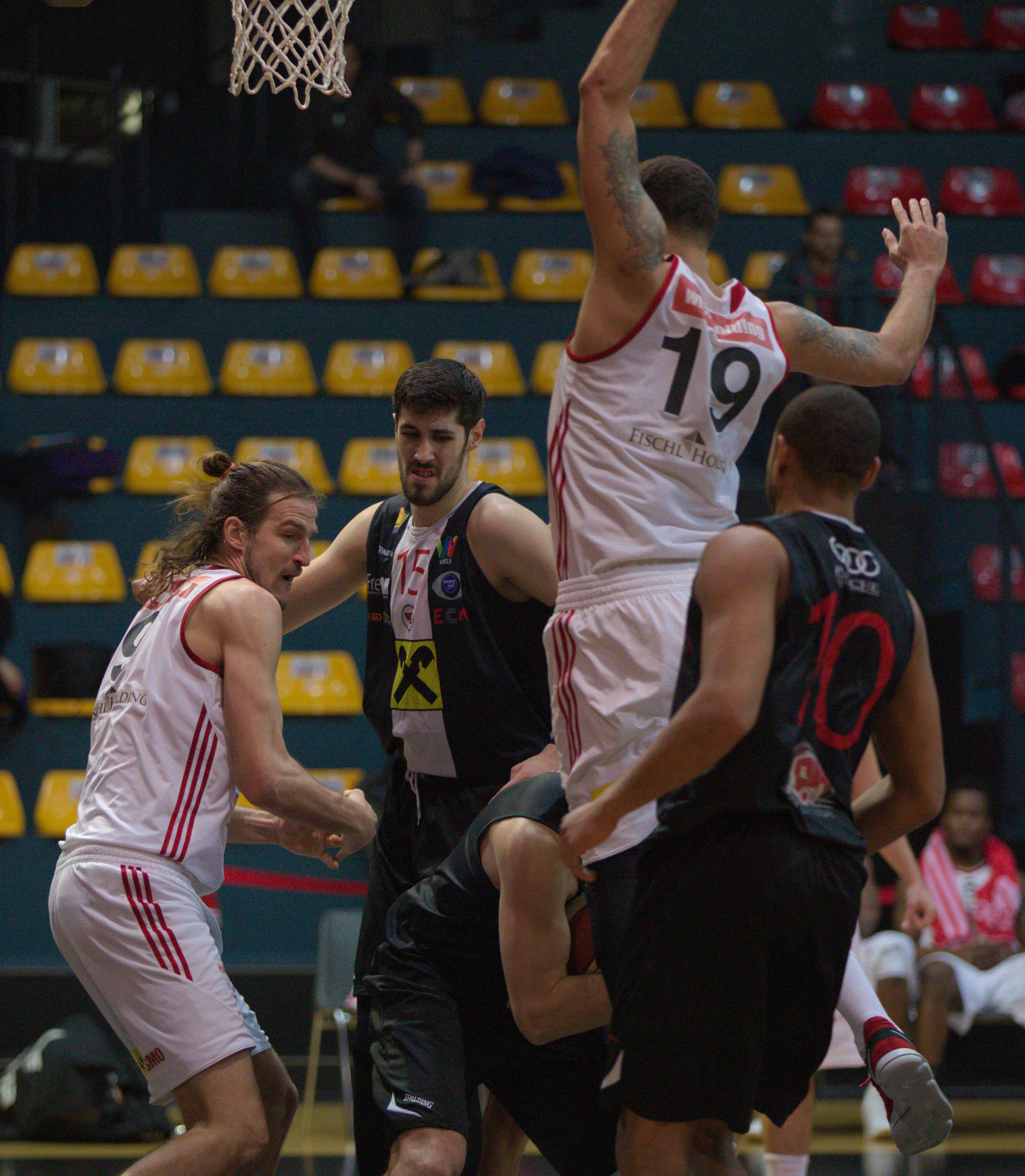
- Drašković (#15 in black), in action with the Flyers Wels.

Anagennisi Arkalichori
- Position: Power forward / center

Personal information
- Born: March 30, 1995 (age 31) Niksic, Montenegro
- Listed height: 7 ft 0.25 in (2.14 m)
- Listed weight: 240 lb (109 kg)

Career information
- NBA draft: 2017: undrafted
- Playing career: 2011–present

Career history
- 2011–2012: Podgorica
- 2012–2015: FC Barcelona
- 2015–2017: Traiskirchen Lions
- 2017–2018: Flyers Wels
- 2018–2019: Swans Gmunden
- 2019–2020: Pagrati
- 2020–2021: Sutjeska
- 2021–2022: ASK Karditsa
- 2022–2023: Α.Ο. Τρίτων Αθηνών
- 2023: Ermis Schimatariou
- 2023–2024: Anagennisi Arkalichori
- 2024–2025: Holargos
- 2025-present: Dafnis

Career highlights
- Greek 2nd Division The best team of the league (2022); Greek 2nd Division Champion (2022); Greek 2nd Division Top Rebounder (2020)
Medals
Men's basketball
Representing Montenegro
2013 FIBA Europe Under-18 Championship Division B
Gold medal – first place	2013 North Macedonia	Under-18

Milovan Drašković (born March 30, 1995) is a Montenegrin professional basketball player. Standing at a height of 2.14 m (7 ft 1/4 in), Drašković can play at both the power forward and center positions.

== Professional career ==
Drašković spent the 2019–20 season with Pagrati, of the Greek 2nd Division.

== National team career ==
Drašković played with the Under-16, Under-18, and Under-20 junior national teams of Montenegro.
