= 2023–24 LEB Plata season =

24th season of the Spanish third basketball league

LEB Plata
- Season: 2023–24
- Games played: 396
- Teams: 28

Final standings
- Champions: ODILO FC Cartagena CB (1st title)
- Promoted: ODILO FC Cartagena CB; Zamora Enamora; CB Starlabs Morón
- Relegated: CB Almansa con Afanion; Juventud Alcalá Escribano EME; Fundación Globalcaja La Roda; Ibersol CB Tarragona; Safir Fruits Alginet; Huelva Comercio LRi21 VIRIDIS

The 2023–24 LEB Plata season was the 24th season of the Spanish basketball third league. It started on 7 October 2023 with the first round of the regular season and ended on 18 May 2024 with the promotion playoffs.

== Teams ==
=== Promotion and relegation (pre-season) ===
A total of 28 teams contested the league, including 19 sides from the 2022–23 season, three relegated from the 2022–23 LEB Oro and six promoted from the Liga EBA.

▼ Relegated from LEB Oro	▲ Promoted to LEB Oro
~~Melilla Ciudad del Deporte~~ (Note: It swapped places with CB Almansa con Afanion.); Juaristi ISB; Bueno Arenas Albacete Basket	Grupo Ureta Tizona Burgos; ~~CB Prat~~ (Note: It refused to promote and Rioverde Clavijo was registered in its place.); Hestia Menorca
▲ Promoted from Liga EBA	▼ Relegated to Liga EBA
Palmer Basket Mallorca Palma; Ibersol CB Tarragona; Homs UE Mataró; Pajarraco CB Santfeliuenc; Huelva Comercio LRi21 VIRIDIS; Ciudad de Huelva Gestia (Note: It purchased place of ENERparking Basket Navarra.); Juventud Alcalá Escribano EME (Note: It swapped places with Italtel Alcobendas.)	Real Canoe NC; Baloncesto Talavera; ~~OCA Global CB Salou~~ (Note: It swapped places with CB Cornellà.); La Antigua CB Tormes; Baskonia B; Recambios Gaudí CB Mollet

=== Venues and locations ===
Location of teams in 2023–24 LEB Plata
Red: Group East; Green: Group West
Location of teams from Barcelona in 2023–24 LEB Plata
Location of teams from the Canary Islands in 2023–24 LEB Plata

Team	Home city	Arena
Bueno Arenas Albacete Basket	Albacete	El Parque
CB Almansa con Afanion	Almansa	Polideportivo de Almansa
CB L'Horta Godella	Godella	Municipal
CB Prat	El Prat de Llobregat	Pavelló Joan Busquets
CB Starlabs Morón	Morón de la Frontera	Alameda
Ciudad de Huelva Gestia	Huelva	Carolina Marín
Class Bàsquet Sant Antoni	Sant Antoni de Portmany	Sa Pedrera
Clínica Ponferrada SDP	Ponferrada	Pabellón Lydia Valentín
Damex UDEA Algeciras	Algeciras	Doctor Juan Carlos Mateo
Fibwi Palma	Palma	Son Moix
Fundación Globalcaja La Roda	La Roda	Juan José Lozano Jareño
Gran Canaria B	Las Palmas	Vega de San José
Homs UE Mataró	Mataró	Josep Mora
Huelva Comercio LRi21 VIRIDIS	Huelva	Andrés Estrada
Ibersol CB Tarragona	Tarragona	El Serrallo
Juaristi ISB	Azpeitia	Municipal
Juventud Alcalá Escribano EME	Alcalá de Henares	Fundación Montemadrid
Lobe Huesca La Magia	Huesca	Palacio Municipal de Huesca
Maderas Sorlí Benicarló	Benicarló	Pavelló Poliesportiu Municipal
Melilla Ciudad del Deporte Enrique Soler	Melilla	Guillermo García Pezzi
OCA Global CB Salou	Salou	Centre Salou
ODILO FC Cartagena CB	Cartagena	Palacio de Deportes
Pajarraco CB Santfeliuenc	Sant Feliu de Llobregat	Juan Carlos Navarro
Palmer Basket Mallorca Palma	Llucmajor	Son Moix
Safir Fruits Alginet	Alginet	Municipal
Sandá Electroclima CB L'Hospitalet	L'Hospitalet	Nou Pavelló del Centre
Teknei Bizkaia Zornotza	Amorebieta-Etxano	Larrea
Zamora Enamora	Zamora	Ángel Nieto

== Regular season ==
=== Group East ===
Pos	Team	Pld	W	L	PF	PA	PD	Pts	Qualification or relegation
1	ODILO FC Cartagena CB	26	21	5	2062	1793	+269	47	Qualification to group champions' playoffs
2	Class Bàsquet Sant Antoni	26	19	7	2084	1861	+223	45	Qualification to promotion playoffs
3	CB Prat	26	18	8	2124	1964	+160	44	Qualification to promotion playoffs
4	OCA Global CB Salou	26	14	12	2011	2018	−7	40	Qualification to promotion playoffs
5	CB L'Horta Godella	26	14	12	1879	1878	+1	40	Qualification to promotion playoffs
6	Maderas Sorlí Benicarló	26	13	13	2013	1940	+73	39	Qualification to promotion playoffs
7	Pajarraco CB Santfeliuenc	26	12	14	2021	2047	−26	38	Qualification to promotion playoffs
8	Gran Canaria B	26	12	14	1891	2015	−124	38	Qualification to promotion playoffs
9	Homs UE Mataró	26	11	15	1949	2021	−72	37	
10	Fibwi Palma	26	10	16	1996	2035	−39	36	
11	Palmer Basket Mallorca Palma	26	10	16	1930	1959	−29	36	Qualification to relegation playoffs
12	Sandá Electroclima CB L'Hospitalet	26	10	16	1847	1976	−129	36	Qualification to relegation playoffs
13	Ibersol CB Tarragona	26	9	17	1876	2030	−154	35	Relegation to Tercera FEB
14	Safir Fruits Alginet	26	9	17	1784	1930	−146	35	Relegation to Tercera FEB

Source: FEB

=== Group West ===
Pos	Team	Pld	W	L	PF	PA	PD	Pts	Qualification or relegation
1	Zamora Enamora	26	24	2	2231	1763	+468	50	Qualification to group champions' playoffs
2	CB Starlabs Morón	26	19	7	2049	1953	+96	45	Qualification to promotion playoffs
3	Bueno Arenas Albacete Basket	26	18	8	1949	1844	+105	44	Qualification to promotion playoffs
4	Teknei Bizkaia Zornotza	26	16	10	2114	2005	+109	42	Qualification to promotion playoffs
5	Clínica Ponferrada SDP	26	14	12	1922	1949	−27	40	Qualification to promotion playoffs
6	Ciudad de Huelva Gestia	26	14	12	2026	1994	+32	40	Qualification to promotion playoffs
7	Damex UDEA Algeciras	26	11	15	1956	1989	−33	37	Qualification to promotion playoffs
8	Melilla Ciudad del Deporte Enrique Soler	26	11	15	1907	2041	−134	37	Qualification to promotion playoffs
9	Juaristi ISB	26	11	15	1964	2035	−71	37	
10	Lobe Huesca La Magia	26	10	16	1930	1934	−4	36	
11	CB Almansa con Afanion	26	9	17	1887	2066	−179	35	Qualification to relegation playoffs
12	Juventud Alcalá Escribano EME	26	9	17	1939	2066	−127	35	Qualification to relegation playoffs
13	Fundación Globalcaja La Roda	26	9	17	1916	1983	−67	35	Relegation to Tercera FEB
14	Huelva Comercio LRi21 VIRIDIS	26	7	19	1990	2158	−168	33	Relegation to Tercera FEB

Source: FEB

== Playoffs ==
=== Group champions' playoffs ===
Team 1	Agg.	Team 2	1st leg	2nd leg
Zamora Enamora	147–154	ODILO FC Cartagena CB	69–60	78–94

Source: FEB

=== Promotion playoffs ===
Team 1	Agg.	Team 2	1st leg	2nd leg
Round of 16
CB Starlabs Morón	195–135	Gran Canaria B	85–70	110–65
Bueno Arenas Albacete Basket	164–137	Pajarraco CB Santfeliuenc	74–57	90–80
Teknei Bizkaia Zornotza	158–133	Maderas Sorlí Benicarló	64–65	94–68
CB L'Horta Godella	151–144	Clínica Ponferrada SDP	67–72	84–72
OCA Global CB Salou	156–167	Ciudad de Huelva Gestia	75–96	81–71
CB Prat	176–171	Damex UDEA Algeciras	83–72	93–99
Class Bàsquet Sant Antoni	157–146	Melilla Ciudad del Deporte Enrique Soler	79–78	78–68
Quarter-finals
Zamora Enamora	171–145	Ciudad de Huelva Gestia	78–58	93–87
Class Bàsquet Sant Antoni	146–133	CB L'Horta Godella	65–64	81–69
CB Starlabs Morón	163–145	Teknei Bizkaia Zornotza	79–72	84–73
CB Prat	151–153	Bueno Arenas Albacete Basket	77–69	74–84
Semi-finals
Zamora Enamora	174–169	Bueno Arenas Albacete Basket	89–87	85–82
Class Bàsquet Sant Antoni	148–150	CB Starlabs Morón	65–74	83–76

Source: FEB

=== Relegation playoffs ===
Team 1	Agg.	Team 2	1st leg	2nd leg
CB Almansa con Afanion	141–142	Sandá Electroclima CB L'Hospitalet	63–86	78–56
Palmer Basket Mallorca Palma	194–159	Juventud Alcalá Escribano EME	103–75	91–84

Source: FEB

== Copa LEB Plata ==
The Copa LEB Plata was played on 20 January 2024 by the top team of each group after the end of the first half of the season (round 13).

=== Teams qualified ===
Pos	Grp	Team	Pld	W	L	PF	PA	PD	Pts
1	East	ODILO FC Cartagena CB	13	12	1	1079	888	+191	25
1	West	Zamora Enamora (H)	13	12	1	1107	837	+270	25

Source: FEB
(H) Hosts

=== Game ===
20 January 2024	Zamora Enamora	95–89(OT)	ODILO FC Cartagena CB	Zamora
19:00	Scoring by quarter: 22–26, 28–13, 14–14, 13–24, Overtime: 18–12
	Pts: Peris 24; Rebs: Paukštė 14; Asts: Naspler 10; Eff: Paukštė 27	Boxscore	Pts: Kody 21; Rebs: Jordá 9 Asts: Blat 5 Eff: Kody 24	Arena: Ángel Nieto; Referees: Manuel Seijo, José Carlos Sierra

== Final standings ==
Pos	Team	Pld	W	L	Promotion, qualification or relegation
1	ODILO FC Cartagena CB (C, P)	28	22	6	Promotion to Primera FEB and qualification for the Spain Cup
2	Zamora Enamora (P, X)	32	29	3	Promotion to Primera FEB and qualification for the Spain Cup
3	CB Starlabs Morón (P)	32	24	8	Promotion to Primera FEB and qualification for the Spain Cup
4	Class Bàsquet Sant Antoni	32	24	8	Qualification for the Spain Cup
5	Bueno Arenas Albacete Basket	32	21	11	Qualification for the Spain Cup
6	CB Prat	30	20	10	Qualification for the Spain Cup
7	Teknei Bizkaia Zornotza	30	17	13	Qualification for the Spain Cup
8	CB L'Horta Godella	30	15	15	Qualification for the Spain Cup
9	Ciudad de Huelva Gestia	30	15	15	Qualification for the Spain Cup
10	OCA Global CB Salou	28	15	13	Qualification for the Spain Cup
11	Clínica Ponferrada SDP	28	15	13	Qualification for the Spain Cup
12	Maderas Sorlí Benicarló	28	14	14	Qualification for the Spain Cup
13	Pajarraco CB Santfeliuenc	28	12	16	Qualification for the Spain Cup
14	Damex UDEA Algeciras	28	12	16	Qualification for the Spain Cup
15	Gran Canaria B	28	12	16	Qualification for the Spain Cup
16	Melilla Ciudad del Deporte Enrique Soler	28	11	17	Qualification for the Spain Cup
17	Juaristi ISB	26	11	15	Qualification for the Spain Cup
18	Homs UE Mataró	26	11	15	Qualification for the Spain Cup
19	Lobe Huesca La Magia	26	10	16	Qualification for the Spain Cup
20	Fibwi Palma	26	10	16	Qualification for the Spain Cup
21	Palmer Basket Mallorca Palma	28	12	16	
22	Sandá Electroclima CB L'Hospitalet	28	11	17	
23	CB Almansa con Afanion (R)	28	10	18	Relegation to Tercera FEB
24	Juventud Alcalá Escribano EME (R)	28	9	19	Relegation to Tercera FEB
25	Fundación Globalcaja La Roda (R)	26	9	17	Relegation to Tercera FEB
26	Ibersol CB Tarragona (R)	26	9	17	Relegation to Tercera FEB
27	Safir Fruits Alginet (R)	26	9	17	Relegation to Tercera FEB
28	Huelva Comercio LRi21 VIRIDIS (R)	26	7	19	Relegation to Tercera FEB

Source: FEB
(C) Champions; (P) Promoted; (R) Relegated; (X) Champion of the Copa LEB Plata
