= 2020–21 LEB Plata season =

LEB Plata
- Season: 2020–21
- Games played: 395
- Teams: 28

Regular season
- Promoted: Juaristi ISB; Barça B CB Prat
- Relegated: Ibersol CB Tarragona; Hozono Global Jairis; CB Cornellà; NCS Alcobendas; CB Morón; Torrons Vicens CB L'Hospitalet

Finals
- Champions: Juaristi ISB (2nd title)

Records
- Biggest home win: Barça 110–58 Navarra (24 October 2020)
- Biggest away win: Villarrobledo 54–91 Menorca (28 November 2020)
- Highest scoring: Ponferrada 100–92 Gijón (12 December 2020)

The 2020–21 LEB Plata season was the 21st season of the Spanish basketball third league. It started on 10 October 2020 with the first round of the regular season and ended on 29 May 2021 with the promotion playoffs.

It was the following season after the 2019–20 season was curtailed in response to the COVID-19 pandemic. Consequently, there were not relegations to Liga EBA and the league was expanded to 28 teams, record of the league, for this season.

== Format changes ==
For this season, the league was expanded to 28 teams divided in two groups of 14 with only one group phase. At the end of the regular season, the top team of each group played for promote directly to LEB Oro, while the loser team will beas dropped to the quarter-finals of the promotion playoffs; the teams that finish in 2nd to 8th place of each group qualified for the promotion playoffs; the teams that finish in 11th and 12th place of each group played the relegation playoffs; and the last two teams of each group were relegated to Liga EBA.

== Teams ==
=== Promotion and relegation (pre-season) ===
A total of 28 teams contested the league, including 21 sides from the 2019–20 season and seven promoted from the 2019–20 Liga EBA.

Teams promoted from Liga EBA

- Aquimisa Carbajosa
- ~~Mondragón Unibersitatea~~ (could not promote and finally registered in Liga EBA)
- NCS Alcobendas
- Ibersol CB Tarragona
- Melilla Sport Capital Enrique Soler
- Hozono Global Jairis
- Zentro Basket Madrid (achieved a vacant berth)
- CB Cornellà (achieved a vacant berth)

=== Venues and locations ===
Location of teams in 2020–21 LEB Plata
Red: Group East; Green: Group West
Location of teams from Barcelona in 2020–21 LEB Plata
Location of teams from the Canary Islands in 2020–21 LEB Plata

Team	Home city	Arena	Capacity
Albacete Basket	Albacete	Pabellón del Parque	1,200
Aquimisa Carbajosa	Carbajosa de la Sagrada	Municipal	
Barça B	Sant Joan Despí	Ciutat Esportiva Joan Gamper	472
CAT&REST Intragas-Clima CDP	Ponferrada	Pabellón Lydia Valentín	2,500
CB Cornellà	Cornellà de Llobregat	Parc Esportiu	
CB Marbella	Marbella	Carlos Cabezas	
CB Morón	Morón de la Frontera	Alameda	600
CB Pardinyes Lleida	Lleida	Pavelló Barris Nord	6,100
CB Prat	El Prat de Llobregat	Pavelló Joan Busquets	500
Círculo Gijón	Gijón	Palacio de Deportes	5,197
El Ventero CBV	Villarrobledo	Los Pintores	
Enerdrink UDEA Algeciras DAM	Algeciras	Pabellón Ciudad de Algeciras	2,300
ENERparking Basket Navarra	Pamplona	Arrosadia	1,500
Fundación Globalcaja La Roda	La Roda	Juan José Lozano Jareño	500
Gran Canaria B	Las Palmas	Centro Insular de Deportes	5,200
Grupo Alega Cantabria	Torrelavega	Vicente Trueba	2,688
Hestia Menorca	Mahón	Pavelló Menorca	5,115
Hozono Global Jairis	Alcantarilla	Fausto Vicent	
Ibersol CB Tarragona	Tarragona	El Serrallo	
Innova Chef	Zamora	Ángel Nieto	2,200
Juaristi ISB	Azpeitia	Municipal	1,000
Mi Arquitecto CB Benicarló	Benicarló	Pavelló Poliesportiu Municipal	2,000
Melilla Sport Capital Enrique Soler	Melilla	Guillermo García Pezzi	
NCS Alcobendas	Alcobendas	Antela Parada	
Reina Yogur Clavijo CB	Logroño	Palacio de los Deportes	4,500
Torrons Vicens CB L'Hospitalet	L'Hospitalet	Nou Pavelló del Centre	700
Zentro Basket Madrid	Madrid	Antonio Díaz Miguel	
Zornotza ST	Amorebieta-Etxano	Larrea	600

== Regular season ==
=== Group East ===
==== League table ====
Pos	Team	Pld	W	L	PF	PA	PD	Pts	Qualification or relegation
1	Barça B	26	21	5	1944	1641	+303	47	Qualification to group champions' playoffs
2	CB Prat	26	19	7	2192	1922	+270	45	Qualification to promotion playoffs
3	Hestia Menorca	26	17	9	1893	1678	+215	43	Qualification to promotion playoffs
4	Albacete Basket	26	15	11	1889	1888	+1	41	Qualification to promotion playoffs
5	Fundación Global1caja La Roda	26	14	12	1848	1805	+43	40	Qualification to promotion playoffs
6	Gran Canaria B	26	14	12	1969	1948	+21	40	Qualification to promotion playoffs
7	CB Pardinyes Lleida	26	13	13	1904	1928	−24	39	Qualification to promotion playoffs
8	ENERparking Basket Navarra	26	13	13	1810	1895	−85	39	Qualification to promotion playoffs
9	El Ventero CBV	26	12	14	1807	1868	−61	38	
10	Mi Arquitecto CB Benicarló	26	12	14	1861	1866	−5	38	
11	Ibersol CB Tarragona	26	9	17	1765	1933	−168	35	Qualification to relegation playoffs
12	Hozono Global Jairis	26	9	17	1757	1808	−51	35	Qualification to relegation playoffs
13	CB Cornellà	26	8	18	1706	1976	−270	34	Relegation to Liga EBA
14	Torrons Vicens CB L'Hospitalet	26	6	20	1674	1863	−189	32	Relegation to Liga EBA

Source: FEB

==== Positions by round ====
The table lists the positions of teams after completion of each round. In order to preserve chronological evolvements, any postponed matches are not included in the round at which they are originally scheduled, but added to the full round they are played immediately afterwards.

Team ╲ Round	1	2	3	4	5	6	7	8	9	10	11	12	13	14	15	16	17	18	19	20	21	22	23	24	25	26
Barça B	6	4	3	2	2	2	2	1	1	1	1	2	1	1	1	1	3	2	1	1	1	1	1	1	1	1
CB Prat	2	2	2	1	1	1	1	2	3	3	3	3	3	3	4	4	4	4	4	3	3	2	2	2	2	2
Hestia Menorca	1	1	1	3	3	3	3	3	2	2	2	1	2	2	3	2	1	1	2	2	2	3	3	4	4	3
Albacete Basket	13	8	5	4	6	4	8	7	4	4	4	4	4	4	2	3	2	3	3	4	4	4	4	3	3	4
Globalcaja La Roda	14	13	14	14	14	14	11	5	10	9	6	5	5	7	8	7	7	8	9	9	9	8	7	7	6	5
Gran Canaria B	5	3	4	5	7	6	4	4	6	10	12	14	12	8	5	5	5	5	5	8	6	5	5	5	5	6
CB Pardinyes Lleida	8	10	9	9	9	8	5	11	9	6	7	6	6	5	6	6	6	7	7	6	5	6	9	9	9	7
ENERparking Navarra	10	11	10	10	13	10	12	10	7	5	5	7	10	11	9	12	10	9	8	7	8	7	6	6	7	8
El Ventero CBV	7	12	12	13	8	9	6	12	13	13	13	10	13	9	13	13	13	11	10	11	12	12	10	10	10	9
Mi Arquitecto Benicarló	9	9	6	6	4	7	10	8	8	11	9	9	7	6	7	8	9	6	6	5	7	9	8	8	8	10
Ibersol Tarragona	4	6	7	7	5	5	7	6	5	8	10	11	9	12	14	14	14	13	12	10	10	10	12	12	12	11
Hozono Global Jairis	12	14	13	12	10	11	14	14	14	14	14	12	14	13	10	11	11	14	13	14	13	11	11	11	11	12
CB Cornellà	3	5	8	8	12	13	13	13	11	7	8	8	8	10	12	10	8	10	11	12	11	13	13	13	13	13
Torrons Vicens	11	7	11	11	11	12	9	9	12	12	11	13	11	14	11	9	12	12	14	13	14	14	14	14	14	14

Qualification to group champions' playoffs
Qualification to promotion playoffs
Qualification to relegation playoffs
Relegation to Liga EBA

Source: FEB

==== Results ====
Home \ Away	ALB	BAR	COR	PAR	PRA	CBV	NAV	ROD	GCA	MEN	JAI	TGN	BNC	HOS
Albacete Basket	—	67–68	75–67	53–72	76–94	64–62	86–75	64–57	79–71	58–71	82–68	80–62	76–67	77–49
Barça B	106–74	—	61–67	66–71	71–68	90–54	110–58	68–72	85–86	70–45	79–63	74–61	67–57	76–61
CB Cornellà	68–85	66–69	—	74–82	72–96	56–74	51–74	49–74	77–59	54–74	67–83	74–65	70–73	63–51
CB Pardinyes Lleida	85–79	59–68	69–75	—	93–84	67–74	62–78	75–78	67–79	78–76	78–75	64–65	56–72	80–67
CB Prat	102–88	60–85	108–74	95–71	—	86–61	68–70	78–61	92–69	78–58	92–75	87–60	76–67	96–59
El Ventero CBV	57–71	72–76	73–77	71–82	89–94	—	77–74	69–73	71–62	54–91	68–65	65–70	73–62	78–66
ENERparking Navarra	76–56	52–58	74–61	74–90	76–88	59–73	—	73–68	95–86	70–74	57–53	68–73	80–74	67–64
Globalcaja La Roda	91–73	49–64	76–79	87–67	82–85	64–63	86–62	—	71–61	61–80	65–55	69–59	82–75	59–68
Gran Canaria B	80–57	54–80	90–61	75–70	93–81	81–70	82–54	77–75	—	68–57	79–87	69–76	85–59	70–58
Hestia Menorca	65–66	60–75	97–66	84–69	72–78	79–61	87–68	66–73	84–55	—	77–59	77–73	80–58	53–47
Hozono Global Jairis	64–59	71–60	71–60	66–70	89–90	52–53	70–64	71–61	88–83	55–64	—	55–64	62–74	63–55
Ibersol Tarragona	68–79	61–79	87–64	69–84	74–72	62–90	71–74	67–80	70–80	49–83	73–67	—	64–72	86–73
Mi Arquitecto Benicarló	69–87	63–64	62–64	66–70	77–70	84–93	52–55	92–89	99–77	69–64	73–71	87–71	—	84–74
Torrons Vicens	74–78	70–75	74–50	78–73	60–74	61–62	75–83	65–45	85–98	66–75	61–59	67–65	46–74	—

Source: FEB
Legend: Blue = home team win; Red = away team win.

=== Group West ===
==== League table ====
Pos	Team	Pld	W	L	PF	PA	PD	Pts	Qualification or relegation
1	Juaristi ISB	26	21	5	2136	1918	+218	47	Qualification to group champions' playoffs
2	Grupo Alega Cantabria	26	19	7	2099	1916	+183	45	Qualification to promotion playoffs
3	Zornotza ST	26	16	10	2020	1901	+119	42	Qualification to promotion playoffs
4	Reina Yogur Clavijo CB	26	16	10	1992	1907	+85	42	Qualification to promotion playoffs
5	CAT&REST Intragas-Clima CDP	26	15	11	2023	1936	+87	41	Qualification to promotion playoffs
6	CB Marbella	26	14	12	1923	1844	+79	40	Qualification to promotion playoffs
7	Círculo Gijón	26	13	13	2037	2024	+13	39	Qualification to promotion playoffs
8	Innova Chef	26	12	14	1901	1965	−64	38	Qualification to promotion playoffs
9	Enerdrink UDEA Algeciras DAM	26	11	15	1835	1914	−79	37	
10	Melilla Sport Capital Enrique Soler	26	11	15	1909	1988	−79	37	
11	Aquimisa Carbajosa	26	11	15	1823	1863	−40	37	Qualification to relegation playoffs
12	Zentro Basket Madrid	26	10	16	2009	2047	−38	36	Qualification to relegation playoffs
13	NCS Alcobendas	26	6	20	1850	2103	−253	32	Relegation to Liga EBA
14	CB Morón (Note: CB Morón was deducted one point after the team left the court unauthorized before start the match in Ponferrada.)	26	7	19	1835	2066	−231	32	Relegation to Liga EBA

Source: FEB

==== Positions by round ====
The table lists the positions of teams after completion of each round. In order to preserve chronological evolvements, any postponed matches are not included in the round at which they are originally scheduled, but added to the full round they are played immediately afterwards.

Team ╲ Round	1	2	3	4	5	6	7	8	9	10	11	12	13	14	15	16	17	18	19	20	21	22	23	24	25	26
Juaristi ISB	2	4	2	5	5	1	4	1	1	1	1	1	1	1	1	1	1	1	1	1	1	1	1	1	1	1
Grupo Alega Cantabria	5	1	1	1	2	3	1	2	2	2	3	2	2	3	2	2	2	3	3	2	2	2	2	2	2	2
Zornotza ST	3	5	3	2	1	2	3	3	4	3	2	3	3	5	6	7	4	2	2	3	5	3	3	3	4	3
Reina Yogur Clavijo	12	12	9	9	8	8	7	6	8	9	7	7	5	2	3	3	3	4	4	4	3	4	4	4	3	4
CAT&REST Intragas	6	2	4	3	3	6	2	5	3	4	4	4	4	6	7	9	10	7	6	6	4	5	5	5	6	5
CB Marbella	4	9	10	10	11	10	9	10	9	8	5	5	8	7	5	6	8	8	8	7	6	6	6	6	5	6
Círculo Gijón	8	13	12	12	10	12	12	13	12	12	10	10	11	13	12	11	11	11	11	11	9	9	8	10	9	7
Innova Chef	13	6	5	4	4	7	6	7	6	7	6	8	6	4	4	4	5	5	5	5	7	7	7	8	8	8
Enerdrink UDEA	11	14	14	14	14	14	10	11	10	11	11	12	9	9	8	8	7	9	10	9	11	10	11	11	11	9
Melilla Sport Capital	10	11	13	13	13	11	14	14	14	14	13	11	12	12	10	12	12	12	13	13	13	12	12	12	13	10
Aquimisa Carbajosa	7	3	6	6	7	5	8	8	7	5	8	6	7	8	9	5	6	6	7	8	10	11	9	7	7	11
Zentro Basket Madrid	1	8	7	8	6	4	5	4	5	6	9	9	10	10	11	10	9	10	9	10	8	8	10	9	10	12
NCS Alcobendas	14	7	8	7	9	9	11	9	11	10	12	13	13	11	13	14	14	14	14	14	14	14	14	14	14	13
CB Morón	9	10	11	11	12	13	13	12	13	13	14	14	14	14	14	13	13	13	12	12	12	13	13	13	12	14

Qualification to group champions' playoffs
Qualification to promotion playoffs
Qualification to relegation playoffs
Relegation to Liga EBA

Source: FEB

==== Results ====
Home \ Away	CAR	PON	MAR	MOR	GIJ	UDE	CAN	ZAM	ISB	MEL	ACB	CLA	ZEN	ZOR
Aquimisa Carbajosa	—	87–85	59–69	84–48	70–66	67–70	79–70	74–57	63–80	48–75	86–62	66–75	75–68	75–87
CAT&REST Intragas	77–58	—	61–69	2–0 (Note: CB Morón left the court unauthorized before start the match.)	100–92	92–62	82–67	73–87	75–64	87–57	79–68	82–74	79–82	85–82
CB Marbella	67–55	92–95	—	84–43	83–71	77–64	64–73	67–62	73–76	81–70	83–63	70–66	73–78	68–72
CB Morón	81–80	80–88	75–94	—	87–77	71–69	79–85	74–81	77–109	80–75	86–82	70–77	98–74	75–86
Círculo Gijón	77–72	78–75	74–69	92–73	—	66–76	76–68	78–71	81–64	85–74	75–84	74–75	90–85	85–65
Enerdrink UDEA	75–45	83–82	52–56	75–81	81–72	—	72–77	80–66	69–87	72–56	82–76	69–77	63–62	58–75
Grupo Alega Cantabria	79–62	84–61	76–62	88–76	86–72	96–77	—	66–52	84–87	92–80	90–61	91–83	91–80	82–74
Innova Chef	67–76	84–81	89–87	82–74	90–92	73–70	69–80	—	83–82	79–74	74–64	63–67	96–94	81–73
Juaristi ISB	70–62	99–85	81–80	84–55	91–77	76–70	86–84	85–68	—	73–72	106–74	70–72	89–70	76–66
Melilla Sport Capital	68–75	80–77	77–59	70–69	72–91	70–68	84–79	81–73	78–84	—	78–63	72–83	83–77	72–68
NCS Alcobendas	62–76	61–69	66–77	82–81	70–85	81–82	85–71	71–62	70–80	83–85	—	82–81	76–67	74–89
Reina Yogur Clavijo	68–82	86–94	80–67	95–66	69–56	70–58	66–80	68–73	80–74	76–68	79–61	—	87–65	86–78
Zentro Basket Madrid	80–70	71–78	100–82	77–70	91–79	78–79	75–78	65–63	80–82	86–78	93–66	79–69	—	64–77
Zornotza ST	80–77	89–79	66–70	74–66	83–76	85–59	72–82	69–56	70–79	80–60	87–63	97–83	76–68	—

Source: FEB
Legend: Blue = home team win; Red = away team win.

== Playoffs ==
=== Group champions' playoffs ===
Team 1	Agg.	Team 2	1st leg	2nd leg
Barça B	122–131	Juaristi ISB	59–65	63–66

Source: FEB

=== Promotion playoffs ===
==== Round of 16 ====
Team 1	Agg.	Team 2	1st leg	2nd leg
Grupo Alega Cantabria	147–129	ENERparking Basket Navarra	63–50	84–79
Zornotza ST	146–120	CB Pardinyes Lleida	88–57	58–63
Reina Yogur Clavijo CB	160–164	Gran Canaria B	78–96	82–68
CAT&REST Intragas-Clima CDP	154–137	Fundación Globalcaja La Roda	66–82	88–55
Albacete Basket	139–155	CB Marbella	65–87	74–68
Hestia Menorca	167–133	Círculo Gijón	84–70	83–63
CB Prat	173–142	Innova Chef	84–73	89–69

Source: FEB

==== Quarter-finals ====
Team 1	Agg.	Team 2	1st leg	2nd leg
Barça B	166–135	Gran Canaria B	96–68	70–67
CB Prat	161–124	CB Marbella	70–58	91–66
Grupo Alega Cantabria	161–119	CAT&REST Intragas-Clima CDP	82–54	79–65
Hestia Menorca	142–145	Zornotza ST	63–74	79–71

Source: FEB

==== Semi-finals ====
Team 1	Agg.	Team 2	1st leg	2nd leg
Barça B	173–132	Zornotza ST	75–63	98–69
CB Prat	144–128	Grupo Alega Cantabria	61–58	83–70

Source: FEB

=== Relegation playoffs ===
Team 1	Agg.	Team 2	1st leg	2nd leg
Aquimisa Carbajosa	142–129	Hozono Global Jairis	64–64	78–65
Ibersol CB Tarragona	142–153	Zentro Basket Madrid	66–78	76–75

Source: FEB

== Copa LEB Plata ==
The Copa LEB Plata was played on 30 January 2021, by the top team of each group after the end of the first half of the season (round 13).

=== Teams qualified ===
Pos	Grp	Team	Pld	W	L	PF	PA	PD	Pts
1	East	Barça B (H)	13	11	2	991	822	+169	24
1	West	Juaristi ISB	13	11	2	1100	953	+147	24

Source: FEB
(H) Hosts

=== Game ===
30 January 2021	Barça B	82–84(OT)	Juaristi ISB	Sant Joan Despí
16:30	Scoring by quarter: 28–11, 13–17, 15–27, 20–21, Overtime: 6–8
	Pts: Badio 24; Rebs: Cuevas 7 Asts: Cuevas 8 Eff: Badio 21	Boxscore	Pts: Buckingham, Savkov 17; Rebs: Guridi, Suárez 7 Asts: Hevia 5 Eff: Hevia 17	Arena: Ciutat Esportiva Joan Gamper; Referees: Sergio Acevedo, Rodrigo Palanca

== Final standings ==
Pos	Team	Pld	W	D	L	Promotion or relegation
1	Juaristi ISB (C, P, X)	28	23	0	5	Promotion to LEB Oro
2	Barça B (P)	32	25	0	7	Promotion to LEB Oro
3	CB Prat (P)	32	25	0	7	Promotion to LEB Oro
4	Grupo Alega Cantabria	32	21	0	11	
5	Zornotza ST	32	18	0	14	
6	Hestia Menorca	30	20	0	10	
7	CAT&REST Intragas-Clima CDP	30	16	0	14	
8	CB Marbella	30	15	0	15	
9	Gran Canaria B	30	15	0	15	
10	Reina Yogur Clavijo CB	28	17	0	11	
11	Albacete Basket	28	16	0	12	
12	Fundación Global1caja La Roda	28	15	0	13	
13	Círculo Gijón	28	13	0	15	
14	CB Pardinyes Lleida	28	14	0	14	
15	ENERparking Basket Navarra	28	13	0	15	
16	Innova Chef	28	12	0	16	
17	El Ventero CBV	26	12	0	14	
18	Enerdrink UDEA Algeciras DAM	26	11	0	15	
19	Mi Arquitecto CB Benicarló	26	12	0	14	
20	Melilla Sport Capital Enrique Soler	26	11	0	15	
21	Aquimisa Carbajosa	28	12	1	15	
22	Zentro Basket Madrid	28	11	0	17	
23	Ibersol CB Tarragona (R)	28	10	0	18	Relegation to Liga EBA
24	Hozono Global Jairis (R)	28	9	1	18	Relegation to Liga EBA
25	CB Cornellà (R)	26	8	0	18	Relegation to Liga EBA
26	NCS Alcobendas (R)	26	6	0	20	Relegation to Liga EBA
27	CB Morón (R)	26	7	0	19	Relegation to Liga EBA
28	Torrons Vicens CB L'Hospitalet (R)	26	6	0	20	Relegation to Liga EBA

Source: FEB
(C) Champions; (P) Promoted; (R) Relegated; (X) Champion of the Copa LEB Plata

== Awards ==
All official awards of the 2020–21 LEB Plata season.

=== Group champions' playoffs MVP ===
Pos.	Player	Team
SF	(Spain) Manex Ansorregui	Juaristi ISB

=== Copa LEB Plata MVP ===
Pos.	Player	Team
SG	(Spain) Ibon Guridi	Juaristi ISB

=== Player of the round ===
==== Regular season ====
Round	Player	Team	Eff.	Ref
1	(Canada) Jabs Newby	Círculo Gijón	35	
2	(Spain) Toni Vicens	CB Cornellà	35	
3	(Spain) Guillermo Bastante	Zentro Basket Madrid	32	
3	(Spain) Javier Lucas	Círculo Gijón	32	
4	(Spain) Walter Cabral	Grupo Alega Cantabria	39	
5	(Spain) Arturo Cruz	Aquimisa Carbajosa	35	
6	(Bulgaria) Simeon Lepichev	ENERparking Basket Navarra	30	
7	(Spain) Walter Cabral (2)	Grupo Alega Cantabria	32	
8	(United States) Mark Hughes	Fundación Globalcaja La Roda	38	
9	(Spain) Miki Ortega	Enerdrink UDEA Algeciras DAM	41	
10	(Spain) Walter Cabral (3)	Grupo Alega Cantabria	36	
11	(Nigeria) Nnamdi Okonkwo	Innova Chef	35	
12	(Croatia) Leo Čizmić	Grupo Alega Cantabria	32	
13	(Spain) Iago Estévez	Enerdrink UDEA Algeciras DAM	33	
14	(United States) Zane Najdawi	Hozono Global Jairis	34	
15	(Spain) Rodrigo Seoane	ENERparking Basket Navarra	32	
16	(Spain) Ignacio Rodríguez	Zentro Basket Madrid	35	
17	(Spain) Víctor Serrano	CB Cornellà	36	
18	(Spain) Pablo Hernández	CAT&REST Intragas-Clima CDP	38	
19	(Argentina) Agustín Barreiro	Zentro Basket Madrid	34	
20	(Spain) Diego Alderete	Aquimisa Carbajosa	28	
21	(Dominican Republic) Jean Montero	Gran Canaria B	34	
22	(United States) Mark Hughes (2)	Fundación Globalcaja La Roda	34	
22	(Jamaica) Jahvaughn Powell	NCS Alcobendas	34	
23	(Dominican Republic) Jeromy Rodríguez	Zornotza ST	34	
24	(Spain) Samuel Rodríguez	Mi Arquitecto CB Benicarló	35	
25	(Spain) Samuel Rodríguez (2)	Mi Arquitecto CB Benicarló	34	
26	(Spain) Imo González	Melilla Sport Capital Enrique Soler	34	
26	(Senegal) Pa Mor Diane	El Ventero CBV	34	
