= 2021–22 LEB Plata season =

LEB Plata
- Season: 2021–22
- Games played: 396
- Teams: 28

Regular season
- Promoted: Grupo Alega Cantabria CBT; Bueno Arenas Albacete Basket; Hereda Club Ourense Baloncesto
- Relegated: Safir Fruits Alginet; Círculo Gijón; Zentro Basket Madrid; Aquimisa Carbajosa Empresarial; El Ventero CBV; CB Marbella

Finals
- Champions: Grupo Alega Cantabria CBT (1st title)

The 2021–22 LEB Plata season was the 22nd season of the Spanish basketball third league. It started on 9 October 2021 with the first round of the regular season and ended on 21 May 2022 with the promotion playoffs.

== Teams ==
=== Promotion and relegation (pre-season) ===
A total of 28 teams contested the league, including 20 sides from the 2020–21 season, three relegated from the 2020–21 LEB Oro and five promoted from the 2020–21 Liga EBA.

Teams relegated from LEB Oro

- Hereda Club Ourense Baloncesto
- ~~ICG Força Lleida~~ (swapped places with Barça B)
- Tizona Universidad de Burgos
- Real Canoe NC

Teams promoted from Liga EBA

- ~~CB Fuenlabrada B~~
- Safir Fruits Alginet
- Valencia Basket B
- FC Cartagena CB
- ~~Movistar Estudiantes B~~
- Recambios Gaudí CB Mollet
- Sant Antoni Ibiza Feeling

Teams that avoided relegation to Liga EBA

- ~~Ibersol CB Tarragona~~
- ~~Hozono Global Jairis~~
- CB Cornellà (swapped places with Barça B)
- ~~NCS Alcobendas~~
- CB Morón
- ~~Torrons Vicens CB L'Hospitalet~~

=== Venues and locations ===
Location of teams in 2021–22 LEB Plata
Red: Group East; Green: Group West
Location of teams from the Canary Islands in 2021–22 LEB Plata

Team	Home city	Arena
Aquimisa Carbajosa Empresarial	Carbajosa de la Sagrada	Municipal
Bueno Arenas Albacete Basket	Albacete	Pabellón del Parque
CB Cornellà	Cornellà de Llobregat	Parc Esportiu
CB Marbella	Marbella	Carlos Cabezas
CB Morón	Morón de la Frontera	Alameda
Círculo Gijón	Gijón	Palacio de Deportes
Clínica Ponferrada CDP	Ponferrada	Pabellón Lydia Valentín
Damex UDEA Algeciras	Algeciras	Pabellón Ciudad de Algeciras
Decolor Fundación Globalcaja La Roda	La Roda	Juan José Lozano Jareño
El Ventero CBV	Villarrobledo	Los Pintores
ENERparking Basket Navarra	Pamplona	Arrosadia
FC Cartagena CB	Cartagena	Palacio de Deportes
Grupo Alega Cantabria CBT	Torrelavega	Vicente Trueba
Herbalife Gran Canaria B	Las Palmas	Vega de San José
Hereda Club Ourense Baloncesto	Ourense	Pazo Paco Paz
Hestia Menorca	Mahón	Pavelló Menorca
Melilla Sport Capital Enrique Soler	Melilla	Guillermo García Pezzi
Mi Arquitecto CB Benicarló	Benicarló	Pavelló Poliesportiu Municipal
Real Canoe NC	Madrid	Polideportivo Pez Volador
Recambios Gaudí CB Mollet	Mollet del Vallès	Plana Lledó
Reina Yogur Clavijo CB	Logroño	Palacio de los Deportes
Safir Fruits Alginet	Alginet	Municipal
Sant Antoni Ibiza Feeling	Sant Antoni de Portmany	Sa Pedrera
Teknei Bizkaia Zornotza	Amorebieta-Etxano	Larrea
Tizona Universidad de Burgos	Burgos	Polideportivo El Plantío
Valencia Basket B	Valencia	L'Alquería
Zamora Enamora	Zamora	Ángel Nieto
Zentro Basket Madrid	Madrid	Antonio Díaz Miguel

== Regular season ==
=== Group East ===
Pos	Team	Pld	W	L	PF	PA	PD	Pts	Qualification or relegation
1	Bueno Arenas Albacete Basket	26	19	7	2058	1908	+150	45	Qualification to group champions' playoffs
2	Mi Arquitecto CB Benicarló	26	16	10	1895	1823	+72	42	Qualification to promotion playoffs
3	Sant Antoni Ibiza Feeling	26	16	10	1971	1822	+149	42	Qualification to promotion playoffs
4	FC Cartagena CB	26	15	11	2019	1919	+100	41	Qualification to promotion playoffs
5	Hestia Menorca	26	15	11	1971	1803	+168	41	Qualification to promotion playoffs
6	Valencia Basket B	26	14	12	2038	1994	+44	40	Qualification to promotion playoffs
7	Decolor Fundación Globalcaja La Roda	26	14	12	1904	1865	+39	40	Qualification to promotion playoffs
8	Recambios Gaudí CB Mollet	26	12	14	2060	2149	−89	38	Qualification to promotion playoffs
9	CB Cornellà	26	12	14	1902	1923	−21	38	
10	Real Canoe NC	26	11	15	2124	2168	−44	37	
11	Safir Fruits Alginet	26	11	15	1826	1931	−105	37	Qualification to relegation playoffs
12	Herbalife Gran Canaria B	26	10	16	1944	2092	−148	36	Qualification to relegation playoffs
13	Zentro Basket Madrid	26	10	16	2054	2217	−163	36	Relegation to Liga EBA
14	El Ventero CBV	26	7	19	1907	2059	−152	33	Relegation to Liga EBA

Source: FEB

=== Group West ===
Pos	Team	Pld	W	L	PF	PA	PD	Pts	Qualification or relegation
1	Grupo Alega Cantabria CBT	26	19	7	2033	1814	+219	45	Qualification to group champions' playoffs
2	Hereda Club Ourense Baloncesto	26	18	8	1951	1780	+171	44	Qualification to promotion playoffs
3	Teknei Bizkaia Zornotza	26	17	9	1912	1805	+107	43	Qualification to promotion playoffs
4	Tizona Universidad de Burgos	26	16	10	2071	1964	+107	42	Qualification to promotion playoffs
5	Zamora Enamora	26	15	11	1912	1863	+49	41	Qualification to promotion playoffs
6	ENERparking Basket Navarra	26	14	12	2036	2032	+4	40	Qualification to promotion playoffs
7	Reina Yogur Clavijo CB	26	13	13	1972	1999	−27	39	Qualification to promotion playoffs
8	Melilla Sport Capital Enrique Soler	26	12	14	2099	2103	−4	38	Qualification to promotion playoffs
9	CB Morón	26	12	14	1884	1834	+50	38	
10	Clínica Ponferrada CDP	26	12	14	2042	1986	+56	38	
11	Círculo Gijón	26	10	16	1981	2091	−110	36	Qualification to relegation playoffs
12	Damex UDEA Algeciras	26	9	17	1918	2194	−276	35	Qualification to relegation playoffs
13	Aquimisa Carbajosa Empresarial	26	8	18	1875	2018	−143	34	Relegation to Liga EBA
14	CB Marbella	26	7	19	1763	1966	−203	33	Relegation to Liga EBA

Source: FEB

== Playoffs ==
=== Group champions' playoffs ===
Team 1	Agg.	Team 2	1st leg	2nd leg
Grupo Alega Cantabria CBT	133–113	Bueno Arenas Albacete Basket	72–55	61–58

Source: FEB

=== Promotion playoffs ===
==== Round of 16 ====
Team 1	Agg.	Team 2	1st leg	2nd leg
Hereda Club Ourense Baloncesto	180–118	Recambios Gaudí CB Mollet	87–59	93–59
Teknei Bizkaia Zornotza	147–121	Decolor Fundación Globalcaja La Roda	78–73	69–48
Tizona Universidad de Burgos	172–175	Valencia Basket B	89–97	83–78
Hestia Menorca	150–161	Zamora Enamora	80–91	70–70
FC Cartagena CB	142–144	ENERparking Basket Navarra	76–79	66–65
Sant Antoni Ibiza Feeling	140–168	Reina Yogur Clavijo CB	61–80	79–88
Mi Arquitecto CB Benicarló	153–156	Melilla Sport Capital Enrique Soler	81–90	72–66

Source: FEB

==== Quarter-finals ====
Team 1	Agg.	Team 2	1st leg	2nd leg
Bueno Arenas Albacete Basket	161–152	Melilla Sport Capital Enrique Soler	88–79	73–73
Hereda Club Ourense Baloncesto	144–139	Reina Yogur Clavijo CB	70–68	74–71
Teknei Bizkaia Zornotza	151–166	ENERparking Basket Navarra	67–74	84–92
Zamora Enamora	173–175	Valencia Basket B	76–91	97–84

Source: FEB

==== Semi-finals ====
Team 1	Agg.	Team 2	1st leg	2nd leg
Bueno Arenas Albacete Basket	153–145	Valencia Basket B	70–71	83–74
Hereda Club Ourense Baloncesto	151–146	ENERparking Basket Navarra	70–62	81–84

Source: FEB

=== Relegation playoffs ===
Team 1	Agg.	Team 2	1st leg	2nd leg
Círculo Gijón	147–166	Herbalife Gran Canaria B	74–62	73–104
Safir Fruits Alginet	147–166	Damex UDEA Algeciras	78–87	69–79

Source: FEB

== Copa LEB Plata ==
The Copa LEB Plata was played by the top team of each group after the end of the first half of the season (round 13). The cup was scheduled originally on 29 January 2022 and was postponed to 12 March 2022 in response to the COVID-19 pandemic.

=== Teams qualified ===
Pos	Grp	Team	Pld	W	L	PF	PA	PD	Pts
1	East	Sant Antoni Ibiza Feeling	13	11	2	1014	854	+160	24
1	West	Teknei Bizkaia Zornotza (H)	13	10	3	1010	907	+103	23

Source: FEB
(H) Hosts

=== Game ===
12 March 2022	Teknei Bizkaia Zornotza	66–64	Sant Antoni Ibiza Feeling	Amorebieta-Etxano
18:30	Scoring by quarter: 10–17, 14–18, 22–10, 20–19
	Pts: Cabrera 14; Rebs: Cabrera 8 Asts: Cabrera 6 Eff: Cabrera 25	Boxscore	Pts: Bilalović 14; Rebs: Smith 5 Asts: Haro 4 Eff: Bilalović 16	Arena: Larrea; Referees: Cristian José García Rodríguez, Alejandro Calvo Aceña

== Final standings ==
Pos	Team	Pld	W	D	L	Promotion or relegation
1	Grupo Alega Cantabria CBT (C, P)	28	21	0	7	Promotion to LEB Oro
2	Bueno Arenas Albacete Basket (P)	32	21	1	10	Promotion to LEB Oro
3	Hereda Club Ourense Baloncesto (P)	32	23	0	9	Promotion to LEB Oro
4	Valencia Basket B	32	17	0	15	
5	ENERparking Basket Navarra	32	18	0	14	
6	Teknei Bizkaia Zornotza (X)	30	19	0	11	
7	Zamora Enamora	30	17	1	12	
8	Reina Yogur Clavijo CB	30	15	0	15	
9	Melilla Sport Capital Enrique Soler	30	13	1	16	
10	Mi Arquitecto CB Benicarló	28	17	0	11	
11	Sant Antoni Ibiza Feeling	28	16	0	12	
12	Tizona Universidad de Burgos	28	17	0	11	
13	FC Cartagena CB	28	16	0	12	
14	Hestia Menorca	28	15	1	12	
15	Decolor Fundación Globalcaja La Roda	28	14	0	14	
16	Recambios Gaudí CB Mollet	28	12	0	16	
17	CB Morón	26	12	0	14	
18	CB Cornellà	26	12	0	14	
19	Clínica Ponferrada CDP	26	12	0	14	
20	Real Canoe NC	26	11	0	15	
21	Herbalife Gran Canaria B	28	11	0	17	
22	Damex UDEA Algeciras	28	11	0	17	
23	Safir Fruits Alginet (R)	28	11	0	17	Relegation to Liga EBA
24	Círculo Gijón (R)	28	11	0	17	Relegation to Liga EBA
25	Zentro Basket Madrid (R)	26	10	0	16	Relegation to Liga EBA
26	Aquimisa Carbajosa Empresarial (R)	26	8	0	18	Relegation to Liga EBA
27	El Ventero CBV (R)	26	7	0	19	Relegation to Liga EBA
28	CB Marbella (R)	26	7	0	19	Relegation to Liga EBA

Source: FEB
(C) Champions; (P) Promoted; (R) Relegated; (X) Champion of the Copa LEB Plata
