= 2022–23 LEB Plata season =

23rd season of a Spanish basketball league

LEB Plata
- Season: 2022–23
- Games played: 396
- Teams: 28

Regular season
- Promoted: UBU Tizona; CB Prat; Hestia Menorca
- Relegated: Real Canoe NC; Baloncesto Talavera; Brisasol CB Salou; La Antigua CB Tormes; Cazoo Baskonia B Recambios Gaudí CB Mollet

Finals
- Champions: UBU Tizona (1st title)

The 2022–23 LEB Plata season was the 23rd season of the Spanish basketball third league. It started on 7 October 2022 with the first round of the regular season and ended on 20 May 2023 with the promotion playoffs.

== Teams ==
=== Promotion and relegation (pre-season) ===
A total of 28 teams contested the league, including 19 sides from the 2021–22 season, three relegated from the 2021–22 LEB Oro and six promoted from the Liga EBA.

Teams relegated from LEB Oro

- CB Prat
- Fibwi Palma
- Lobe Huesca La Magia

Teams promoted from Liga EBA

- ~~Barça B~~ (swapped places with Brisasol CB Salou)
- ~~CB Santurtzi SK~~ (did not fulfill the requirements)
- Cazoo Baskonia B
- La Antigua CB Tormes
- CB L'Hospitalet
- ~~CB Pozuelo~~ (swapped places with Baloncesto Talavera)
- CB L'Horta Godella (swapped places with Valencia Basket B that was registered in Liga EBA despite having spot in the league)

Teams that avoided relegation to Liga EBA

- Safir Fruits Alginet
- ~~Círculo Gijón~~
- ~~Zentro Basket Madrid~~
- ~~Aquimisa Carbajosa Empresarial~~
- ~~El Ventero CBV~~
- ~~CB Marbella~~

=== Venues and locations ===
Location of teams in 2022–23 LEB Plata
Red: Group East; Green: Group West
Location of teams from the Canary Islands in 2022–23 LEB Plata

Team	Home city	Arena
Baloncesto Talavera	Talavera de la Reina	Primero de Mayo
Brisasol CB Salou	Salou	Centre Salou
Cazoo Baskonia B	Vitoria-Gasteiz	Mendizorrotza
CB Cornellà	Cornellà de Llobregat	Parc Esportiu
CB L'Horta Godella	Godella	Municipal
CB L'Hospitalet	L'Hospitalet	Nou Pavelló del Centre
CB Minuscenter Morón	Morón de la Frontera	Alameda
CB Prat	El Prat de Llobregat	Pavelló Joan Busquets
Class Bàsquet Sant Antoni	Sant Antoni de Portmany	Sa Pedrera
Clínica Ponferrada SDP	Ponferrada	Pabellón Lydia Valentín
Damex UDEA Algeciras	Algeciras	Doctor Juan Carlos Mateo
Decolor Fundación Globalcaja La Roda	La Roda	Juan José Lozano Jareño
ENERparking Basket Navarra	Pamplona	Arrosadia
Fibwi Palma	Palma	Son Moix
Gran Canaria B	Las Palmas	Vega de San José
Hestia Menorca	Mahón	Pavelló Menorca
La Antigua CB Tormes	Salamanca	Würzburg
Lobe Huesca La Magia	Huesca	Palacio Municipal de Huesca
Maderas Sorlí Benicarló	Benicarló	Pavelló Poliesportiu Municipal
Melilla Sport Capital Enrique Soler	Melilla	Guillermo García Pezzi
ODILO FC Cartagena CB	Cartagena	Palacio de Deportes
Real Canoe NC	Madrid	Polideportivo Pez Volador
Recambios Gaudí CB Mollet	Mollet del Vallès	Plana Lledó
Rioverde Clavijo	Logroño	Palacio de los Deportes
Safir Fruits Alginet	Alginet	Municipal
Teknei Bizkaia Zornotza	Amorebieta-Etxano	Larrea
UBU Tizona	Burgos	Polideportivo El Plantío
Zamora Enamora	Zamora	Ángel Nieto

== Regular season ==
=== Group East ===
Pos	Team	Pld	W	L	PF	PA	PD	Pts	Qualification or relegation
1	CB Prat	26	22	4	2201	1825	+376	48	Qualification to group champions' playoffs
2	Hestia Menorca	26	21	5	1961	1742	+219	47	Qualification to promotion playoffs
3	Maderas Sorlí Benicarló	26	18	8	1973	1842	+131	44	Qualification to promotion playoffs
4	Class Bàsquet Sant Antoni	26	18	8	2065	1939	+126	44	Qualification to promotion playoffs
5	Fibwi Palma	26	16	10	2108	2124	−16	42	Qualification to promotion playoffs
6	CB Cornellà	26	14	12	2025	1972	+53	40	Qualification to promotion playoffs
7	ODILO FC Cartagena CB	26	13	13	1792	1740	+52	39	Qualification to promotion playoffs
8	CB L'Horta Godella	26	12	14	1954	1965	−11	38	Qualification to promotion playoffs
9	Gran Canaria B	26	11	15	1923	1921	+2	37	
10	Lobe Huesca La Magia	26	9	17	1817	1969	−152	35	
11	CB L'Hospitalet	26	8	18	1943	2080	−137	34	Qualification to relegation playoffs
12	Safir Fruits Alginet	26	8	18	1919	2109	−190	34	Qualification to relegation playoffs
13	Brisasol CB Salou	26	7	19	1865	2030	−165	33	Relegation to Liga EBA
14	Recambios Gaudí CB Mollet	26	5	21	1899	2187	−288	31	Relegation to Liga EBA

Source: FEB

=== Group West ===
Pos	Team	Pld	W	L	PF	PA	PD	Pts	Qualification or relegation
1	UBU Tizona	26	24	2	2270	1784	+486	50	Qualification to group champions' playoffs
2	Rioverde Clavijo	26	19	7	1942	1793	+149	45	Qualification to promotion playoffs
3	Teknei Bizkaia Zornotza	26	18	8	2060	1896	+164	44	Qualification to promotion playoffs
4	ENERparking Basket Navarra	26	16	10	2097	2030	+67	42	Qualification to promotion playoffs
5	Damex UDEA Algeciras	26	15	11	2016	1952	+64	41	Qualification to promotion playoffs
6	Clínica Ponferrada SDP	26	14	12	2137	2134	+3	40	Qualification to promotion playoffs
7	Zamora Enamora	26	13	13	1930	1889	+41	39	Qualification to promotion playoffs
8	Decolor Fundación Globalcaja La Roda	26	12	14	1970	2081	−111	38	Qualification to promotion playoffs
9	Melilla Sport Capital Enrique Soler	26	10	16	1918	2038	−120	36	
10	CB Minuscenter Morón	26	10	16	2088	2196	−108	36	
11	Real Canoe NC	26	9	17	2073	2226	−153	35	Qualification to relegation playoffs
12	Baloncesto Talavera	26	8	18	1944	2111	−167	34	Qualification to relegation playoffs
13	La Antigua CB Tormes	26	7	19	1934	2136	−202	33	Relegation to Liga EBA
14	Cazoo Baskonia B	26	7	19	2025	2138	−113	33	Relegation to Liga EBA

Source: FEB

== Playoffs ==
=== Group champions' playoffs ===
Team 1	Agg.	Team 2	1st leg	2nd leg
UBU Tizona	164–150	CB Prat	76–60	88–90

Source: FEB

=== Promotion playoffs ===
==== Round of 16 ====
Team 1	Agg.	Team 2	1st leg	2nd leg
Rioverde Clavijo	145–126	CB L'Horta Godella	67–60	78–66
Teknei Bizkaia Zornotza	139–138	ODILO FC Cartagena CB	63–65	76–73
ENERparking Basket Navarra	160–156	CB Cornellà	72–71	88–85
Fibwi Palma	157–143	Damex UDEA Algeciras	71–62	86–81
Class Bàsquet Sant Antoni	166–173	Clínica Ponferrada SDP	80–82	86–91
Maderas Sorlí Benicarló	141–147	Zamora Enamora	66–66	75–81
Hestia Menorca	154–119	Decolor Fundación Globalcaja La Roda	82–63	72–56

Source: FEB

==== Quarter-finals ====
Team 1	Agg.	Team 2	1st leg	2nd leg
CB Prat	157–147	Zamora Enamora	84–68	73–79
Hestia Menorca	168–132	Clínica Ponferrada SDP	77–66	91–66
Rioverde Clavijo	156–146	Fibwi Palma	65–67	91–79
Teknei Bizkaia Zornotza	159–160	ENERparking Basket Navarra	77–85	82–75

Source: FEB

==== Semi-finals ====
Team 1	Agg.	Team 2	1st leg	2nd leg
CB Prat	191–144	ENERparking Basket Navarra	91–71	100–73
Hestia Menorca	134–120	Rioverde Clavijo	67–59	67–61

Source: FEB

=== Relegation playoffs ===
Team 1	Agg.	Team 2	1st leg	2nd leg
Real Canoe NC	161–185	Safir Fruits Alginet	77–99	84–86
CB L'Hospitalet	147–143	Baloncesto Talavera	67–63	80–80

Source: FEB

== Copa LEB Plata ==
The Copa LEB Plata was played on 28 January 2023 by the top team of each group after the end of the first half of the season (round 13).

=== Teams qualified ===
Pos	Grp	Team	Pld	W	L	PF	PA	PD	Pts
1	East	Hestia Menorca (H)	13	11	2	990	862	+128	24
1	West	UBU Tizona	13	12	1	1133	847	+286	25

Source: FEB
(H) Hosts

=== Game ===
28 January 2023	Hestia Menorca	76–90	UBU Tizona	Mahón
19:30	Scoring by quarter: 18–23, 13–23, 17–22, 28–22
	Pts: Molins 22; Rebs: Alderete 7 Asts: Molins 5 Eff: Molins 24	Boxscore	Pts: Cremo 22; Rebs: Bortolussi, Kande 7 Asts: Cremo 3 Eff: Cremo 30	Arena: Pavelló Menorca; Referees: Juan Alberto Pinela García, Israel Chacón Blázquez

== Final standings ==
Pos	Team	Pld	W	D	L	Promotion or relegation
1	UBU Tizona (C, P, X)	28	25	0	3	Promotion to LEB Oro
2	CB Prat (P)	32	26	0	6	Promotion to LEB Oro
3	Hestia Menorca (P)	32	27	0	5	Promotion to LEB Oro
4	Rioverde Clavijo	32	22	0	10	
5	ENERparking Basket Navarra	32	19	0	13	
6	Teknei Bizkaia Zornotza	30	20	0	10	
7	Fibwi Palma	30	19	0	11	
8	Clínica Ponferrada SDP	30	16	0	14	
9	Zamora Enamora	30	15	1	14	
10	Maderas Sorlí Benicarló	28	18	1	9	
11	Class Bàsquet Sant Antoni	28	18	0	10	
12	Damex UDEA Algeciras	28	15	0	13	
13	CB Cornellà	28	14	0	14	
14	ODILO FC Cartagena CB	28	14	0	14	
15	CB L'Horta Godella	28	12	0	16	
16	Decolor Fundación Globalcaja La Roda	28	12	0	16	
17	Gran Canaria B	26	11	0	15	
18	Melilla Sport Capital Enrique Soler	26	10	0	16	
19	CB Minuscenter Morón	26	10	0	16	
20	Lobe Huesca La Magia	26	9	0	17	
21	CB L'Hospitalet	28	9	1	18	
22	Safir Fruits Alginet	28	10	0	18	
23	Real Canoe NC (R)	28	9	0	19	Relegation to Liga EBA
24	Baloncesto Talavera (R)	28	8	1	19	Relegation to Liga EBA
25	Brisasol CB Salou (R)	26	7	0	19	Relegation to Liga EBA
26	La Antigua CB Tormes (R)	26	7	0	19	Relegation to Liga EBA
27	Cazoo Baskonia B (R)	26	7	0	19	Relegation to Liga EBA
28	Recambios Gaudí CB Mollet (R)	26	5	0	21	Relegation to Liga EBA

Source: FEB
(C) Champions; (P) Promoted; (R) Relegated; (X) Champion of the Copa LEB Plata
