= CB Morón =

Basketball team in Andalusia, Spain

- Leagues: LEB Oro
- Founded: 1993
- Arena: Pabellón de la Alameda
- Location: Morón de la Frontera, Andalusia
- Team colors: Green, Black
- Head coach: Javier Fijo
- Website: Official website
| Home | Away |

Club Baloncesto Morón, also known as Aceitunas Fragata Morón as sponsorship, is a Spanish professional basketball team based in Morón de la Frontera, Andalusia, competing in the LEB Oro.

== History ==
The club was founded on 1 February 1993 with the aim to replace former CD Arunci, that was dissolved.

In July 2015 the club was promoted to LEB Plata after winning the three games of one of the Final Stages of the 2014–15 Liga EBA.

For the 2024–25 season, the club was promoted to LEB Oro.

== Season by season ==
| Season | Tier | Division | Pos. | W–L |
|---|---|---|---|---|
| 2005–06 | 5 | 1ª División | 3rd | 15–7 |
| 2006–07 | 5 | 1ª División | 20th | 11–14 |
| 2007–08 | 6 | 1ª División | 14th | 8–15 |
| 2008–09 | 6 | 1ª División | 2nd | 21–3 |
| 2009–10 | 4 | Liga EBA | 7th | 15–15 |
| 2010–11 | 4 | Liga EBA | 3rd | 17–7 |
| 2011–12 | 4 | Liga EBA | 5th | 10–6 |
| 2012–13 | 4 | Liga EBA | 3rd | 15–5 |
| 2013–14 | 4 | Liga EBA | 1st | 19–6 |
| 2014–15 | 4 | Liga EBA | 1st | 24–5 |
| 2015–16 | 3 | LEB Plata | 9th | 14–15 |
| 2016–17 | 3 | LEB Plata | 5th | 21–18 |
| 2017–18 | 3 | LEB Plata | 8th | 16–17 |
| 2018–19 | 3 | LEB Plata | 13th | 16–18 |
| 2019–20 | 3 | LEB Plata | 18th (Note: Season curtailed due to the COVID-19 pandemic.) | 11–14 |
| 2020–21 | 3 | LEB Plata | 27th | 7–19 |
| 2021–22 | 3 | LEB Plata | 17th | 12–14 |
| 2022–23 | 3 | LEB Plata | 19th | 10–16 |
| 2023–24 | 3 | LEB Plata | 3rd | 24–8 |

== Notable players ==
To appear in this section a player must have either:

- Set a club record or won an individual award as a professional player.
- Played at least one official international match for his senior national team at any time.

- (The Bahamas) J.R. Cadot
- (Finland) Thomas Tumba
- (Portugal) Diogo Brito
- (Uganda) Brandon Sebirumbi
