= CB Menorca =

Spanish basketball club

Club Bàsquet Menorca
- Leagues: Primera FEB
- Founded: 2016; 10 years ago
- Arena: Pavelló Menorca
- Capacity: 5,115
- Location: Mahón, Menorca, Balearic Islands
- Head coach: Javier Zamora
- Website: www.basquetmenorca.com
Home	Away

Club Bàsquet Menorca is a Spanish basketball club based in Mahón, Balearic Islands.

== History ==
Bàsquet Menorca was founded in 2016 with the aim to reach again the professional basketball after the dissolution of former Liga ACB team Menorca Bàsquet. In its first season, the club played in Liga EBA with the place of the Balearic multi-sports club CCE Sant Lluís, based in the namesake municipality that played the previous season in the same league.

The 2017–18 season was the first one of the club with the name of Club Bàsquet Menorca, starting to play its home matches at Pavelló Menorca. It ended the season with a promotion at home to LEB Plata, third tier. At the 2018-19 LEB Plata season CB Menorca would get a sponsor in the form of Fundación Hestia, changing their name to CB Hestia Menorca.

At the 2022-23 LEB Plata season, the team managed to get second in the league table, which opened a chance for the team to get promoted through the promotion play-offs, after having failed in the 2020-21 LEB Plata season.

After beating CP La Roda in the round of 16 and CB Ciudad de Ponferrada in the quarter-finals, CB Hestia Menorca would beat CB Clavijo and get promoted to LEB Oro, making the first time in 10 years that a Menorcan team would have the chance to play at the second division of Spanish basketball. In their first season back, the 2023-24 LEB Oro season, CB Menorca managed a 12th spot in the league after starting the season in horrible form and always being in the relegation spots.

== Season by season ==
Season	Tier	Division	Pos.	W–L	Cup competitions	
2016–17	4	Liga EBA	3rd	15–11		
2017–18	4	Liga EBA	2nd	24–7		
2018–19	3	LEB Plata	14th	18–16		
2019–20	3	LEB Plata	10th (Note: Season curtailed due to the COVID-19 pandemic.)	15–10		
2020–21	3	LEB Plata	6th	20–10		
2021–22	3	LEB Plata	14th	15–1–12		
2022–23	3	LEB Plata	3rd	27–5	Copa LEB Plata	RU
2023–24	2	LEB Oro	12th	14–20		
2024–25	2	Primera FEB	15th	11–23	Spain Cup	GS
2025–26	2	Primera FEB	8th	18–18	Spain Cup	R32
2026–27	2	Primera FEB			Spain Cup	R32

== Current roster ==
Note: Flags indicate national team eligibility at FIBA-sanctioned events. Players may hold other non-FIBA nationalities not displayed.

CB Menorca roster
Players
Coaches

Pos.	No.	Nat.	Name	Ht.	Age
SF	0	(Spain)	Vicedo, Édgar	2.04 m (6 ft 8 in)	32 – 24 August 1994
PG	1	(United States)	Cone, Jalen	1.80 m (5 ft 11 in)	25 – 14 December 2000
SG	2	(Norway)	Rotegård, Tobias	2.01 m (6 ft 7 in)	26 – 8 May 2000
PF	3	(United States) (Haiti)	Galette, Nico	1.97 m (6 ft 6 in)	24 – 22 June 2002
PG	7	(Spain)	Figueras, Pol	1.85 m (6 ft 1 in)	28 – 21 March 1998
PF	8	(Austria)	Schott, Fynn	2.03 m (6 ft 8 in)	20 – 13 April 2006
SG	11	(United States)	Littleson, Spencer	1.93 m (6 ft 4 in)	28 – 29 May 1998
SG	13	(Spain)	Lobo, Jaume	1.80 m (5 ft 11 in)	33 – 31 July 1993
PG	15	(Spain)	Molins, Pol	1.91 m (6 ft 3 in)	27 – 4 February 1999
CG	21	(Georgia (country)) (United States)	McFadden, Thad	1.88 m (6 ft 2 in)	39 – 29 May 1987
PF	23	(United States) (Democratic Republic of the Congo)	Wembi, Emmanuel	2.05 m (6 ft 9 in)	28 – 24 October 1997
CG	55	(Spain)	Sola, Adams	1.93 m (6 ft 4 in)	26 – 27 July 2000
C	77	(Spain)	Arteaga, Víctor	2.13 m (7 ft 0 in)	34 – 7 July 1992

Head coach

- (Spain) Javier Zamora

Legend

- (C) Team captain
- Injured

- Roster
Updated: April 6, 2026
