= 2018–19 Liga EBA season =

25th season of the Liga EBA

Liga EBA
- Season: 2018–19
- Duration: 22 September 2018 – 19 May 2019
- Teams: 107

Regular season
- Promoted: Bierzo Fitness Dentomedic Ciudad de Ponferrada; Ilerdauto Nissan Pardinyes Lleida; Enerdrink UDEA Algeciras; UBU Tizona; NCS Alcobendas; Movistar Estudiantes B
- All statistics correct as of 21 October 2018.

The 2018–19 Liga EBA season is the 25th season of the Spanish basketball fourth league. The season started on 22 September 2018 and will end on 19 May 2019 with the promotion playoffs to LEB Plata.

== Competition format ==
Teams are divided in five groups attending to geographical criteria. Groups A, C, D and E are divided in two.

=== Regular season ===
- Group A–A: Basque Country, Cantabria, Castile and León and Navarre.
- Group A–B: Asturias, Galicia and Castile and León.
- Group B: Community of Madrid, Castile-La Mancha and Canary Islands.
- Group C–A: Aragon, Catalonia and Balearic Islands.
- Group C–B: Andorra, Aragon, Catalonia and Balearic Islands.
- Group D–A: Andalusia and Melilla.
- Group D–B: Andalusia and Extremadura.
- Group E–A: Valencian Community.
- Group E–B: Valencian Community and Region of Murcia.

=== Final stage ===
The three best teams of each group and the fourth of Group A (champion of the previous season) will play the promotion playoffs. From these 16 teams, only six will be promoted to LEB Plata.

Since this season, only two teams will host one of the two final stages. Each final stage consist in two groups of four teams where the group winners will promote directly to LEB Plata.

The two runners-up from each stage will play a final match for the two last spots.

=== Eligibility of players ===
The Spanish Basketball Federation limited the number of non-EU players to only two and forced the clubs to have at least eight homegrown players.

== Regular season ==
=== Group A ===
The 28 teams of the group were divided into two subgroups, where the two first qualified teams of each one would join the final stage. The two group winners will face for deciding the first and second position of the group; the same for the two runners-up, deciding the positions third and fourth.

==== Group A–A ====
Pos	Team	Pld	W	L	PF	PA	PD	Pts	Qualification or relegation
1	Megacalzado Ardoi	26	24	2	2244	1972	+272	50	Qualification to the Final Stage
2	UBU Tizona	26	23	3	2252	1861	+391	49	Qualification to the Final Stage
3	Pas Piélagos	26	21	5	2328	2019	+309	47	
4	Gallofa	26	18	8	2104	1937	+167	44	
5	Mondragón Unibersitatea	26	16	10	2111	2018	+93	42	
6	CB Valle de Egüés	26	15	11	1983	1876	+107	41	
7	Nissan Grupo de Santiago	26	14	12	2197	2178	+19	40	
8	CB Santurtzi SK	26	11	15	1802	1881	−79	37	
9	Easo Loquillo	26	10	16	1733	1940	−207	36	
10	CB La Flecha	26	9	17	1962	2052	−90	35	
11	Goierri Iparragirre 2020	26	7	19	1920	2272	−352	33	Relegation to Primera División
12	Universidad de Valladolid	26	6	20	1922	2101	−179	32	Relegation to Primera División
13	CB Solares	26	5	21	1896	2093	−197	31	Relegation to Primera División
14	Ordizia Basoa Banaketak	26	3	23	1749	2003	−254	29	Relegation to Primera División

Source: Liga EBA

==== Group A–B ====
Pos	Team	Pld	W	L	PF	PA	PD	Pts	Qualification or relegation
1	Bierzo Fitness Dentomedic Ciudad de Ponferrada	26	20	6	2276	1919	+357	46	Qualification to the Final Stage
2	Ucoga Seguros CB Chantada	26	18	8	1912	1667	+245	44	Qualification to the Final Stage
3	Innova Chef	26	18	8	2030	1912	+118	44	
4	Huniko Gijón Basket	26	17	9	2033	1793	+240	43	
5	KFC Culle	26	17	9	1935	1795	+140	43	
6	ULE Iriego Basket León	26	15	11	2052	1856	+196	41	
7	Estudiantes Lugo Leyma Natura	26	14	12	2010	2087	−77	40	
8	Aquimisa Carbajosa	26	14	12	1956	1906	+50	40	
9	Porriño Baloncesto Base	26	12	14	1837	1974	−137	38	
10	Liberbank Oviedo Baloncesto B	26	11	15	1748	1878	−130	37	
11	Santo Domingo Betanzos	26	11	15	1981	1958	+23	37	
12	Baloncesto Narón	26	9	17	1816	1967	−151	35	Relegation to Primera División
13	Instituto Rosalía de Castro	26	5	21	1658	1987	−329	31	Relegation to Primera División
14	Agustinos Leclerc	26	1	25	1608	2153	−545	27	Relegation to Primera División

Source: Liga EBA

==== Finals ====
===== First-qualified teams playoff =====
The winner of this single-legged series qualified as group A champion. The game was played on 4 May at Municipal of Zizur Nagusia.

Team 1	Score	Team 2
Megacalzado Ardoi	93–95	Bierzo Fitness Dentomedic Ciudad de Ponferrada

=== Group B ===
The three top teams will join the final stage.

Pos	Team	Pld	W	L	PF	PA	PD	Pts	Qualification or relegation
1	Gran Canaria B	30	24	6	2518	2142	+376	54	Qualification to the Final Stage
2	Real Madrid B (Note: Real Madrid B resigned to play the final stage as it is played during the same dates as the final of the Next Generation Tournament.)	30	24	6	2653	2217	+436	54	
3	NCS Alcobendas	30	22	8	2394	2180	+214	52	Qualification to the Final Stage
4	Movistar Estudiantes B	30	21	9	2205	2037	+168	51	Qualification to the Final Stage
5	Náutico Tenerife	30	20	10	2433	2237	+196	50	
6	Estudio	30	16	14	2603	2627	−24	46	
7	Lujisa Guadalajara Basket	30	16	14	2148	2213	−65	46	
8	Globalcaja Quintanar	30	16	14	2284	2259	+25	46	
9	Uros de Rivas Bon Lar	30	15	15	2376	2306	+70	45	
10	Zentro Basket Madrid	30	13	17	2530	2580	−50	43	
11	Aloe Plus Lanzarote Conejeros	30	11	19	2279	2356	−77	41	
12	CB Pozuelo Arrabe Asesores	30	11	19	2268	2417	−149	41	
13	Autocares Rodríguez Daimiel	30	9	21	2217	2461	−244	39	Relegation to Primera División
14	Club Baloncesto Aridane	30	9	21	2464	2618	−154	39	Relegation to Primera División
15	Novum Energy Liceo Francés	30	7	23	2144	2521	−377	37	Relegation to Primera División
16	Eurocolegio Casvi	30	6	24	2107	2452	−345	36	Relegation to Primera División

Source: Liga EBA

=== Group C ===
As in the group A, the 28 teams were divided into two subgroups, where the two first qualified teams of each one would join the Final Four for deciding the three participant teams in the final stage.

==== Group C–A ====
Pos	Team	Pld	W	L	PF	PA	PD	Pts	Qualification or relegation
1	Ibersol CB Tarragona	26	22	4	2018	1730	+288	48	Qualification to Final Four
2	Monbus CB Igualada	26	20	6	1966	1770	+196	46	Qualification to Final Four
3	CB Quart Germans Cruz	26	20	6	1967	1696	+271	46	
4	Mataró Feimat	26	18	8	2000	1874	+126	44	
5	Tenea CB Esparreguera	26	17	9	1951	1829	+122	43	
6	Anagan Olivar	26	15	11	2046	1997	+49	41	
7	CB Salou	26	13	13	1863	1905	−42	39	
8	CB Martorell	26	12	14	1945	1916	+29	38	
9	CB Cornellà	26	11	15	1879	1939	−60	37	
10	Mataró Parc Boet	26	10	16	1884	2037	−153	36	
11	CB Valls Nutrion	26	9	17	1788	1870	−82	35	
12	Flanigan Calvià	26	8	18	1853	1994	−141	34	Qualification to relegation playoffs
13	CB Salt	26	4	22	1839	2129	−290	30	Qualification to relegation playoffs
14	CB Castellbisbal	26	3	23	1684	1997	−313	29	Relegation to Primera División

Source: Liga EBA

==== Group C–B ====
Pos	Team	Pld	W	L	PF	PA	PD	Pts	Qualification or relegation
1	Ilerdauto Nissan Pardinyes Lleida	26	21	5	2148	1869	+279	47	Qualification to Final Four
2	Oic Penta UB Sant Adrià	26	20	6	2124	1917	+207	46	Qualification to Final Four
3	Recambios Gaudí CB Mollet	26	19	7	2064	1825	+239	45	
4	Alfindén CB	26	14	12	1890	1958	−68	40	
5	Arenys Bàsquet Joventut	26	14	12	1908	1862	+46	40	
6	BBA Castelldefels	26	14	12	1804	1757	+47	40	
7	BC MoraBanc Andorra B	26	12	14	1974	2056	−82	38	
8	JAC Sants	26	12	14	1758	1756	+2	38	
9	SESE	26	11	15	1758	1890	−132	37	
10	Palma Air Europa B	26	11	15	1885	1916	−31	37	
11	Barberà Team Values	26	11	15	1841	1931	−90	37	
12	FC Martinenc Bàsquet	26	10	16	1962	1960	+2	36	Qualification to relegation playoffs
13	Coalci CB Sant Josep	26	9	17	1927	2056	−129	35	Qualification to relegation playoffs
14	Vive El Masnou Basquetbol	26	4	22	1825	2115	−290	30	Relegation to Primera División

Source: Liga EBA

==== Finals ====
===== Final Four =====
The winner, runner-up and third place game winner qualifies for the final stage. The games were played on 4 and 5 May at Pavelló Barris Nord of Lleida.

Semifinals
Ibersol CB Tarragona	88
Oic Penta UB Sant Adrià	79
Ilerdauto Nissan Pardinyes Lleida	87
Monbus CB Igualada	84

Final
Ibersol CB Tarragona	72
Ilerdauto Nissan Pardinyes Lleida	65
Third place
Oic Penta UB Sant Adrià	80
Monbus CB Igualada	89

===== Relegation playoffs =====
Winners remained at Liga EBA. First leg was played on 5 May, second on 11.

Team 1	Agg.	Team 2	1st leg	2nd leg
Coalci CB Sant Josep	120–133	Flanigan Calvià	61–62	59–71
CB Salt	140–161	FC Martinenc Bàsquet	70–74	70–87

=== Group D ===
20 teams were divided into two groups. The five first teams of each group joined the second stage, where the best three teams will join the final stage.

==== Regular season ====
===== Group D–A =====
Pos	Team	Pld	W	L	PF	PA	PD	Pts	Qualification
1	CAM Enrique Soler	18	14	4	1510	1363	+147	32	Qualification to second stage
2	CB Marbella	18	14	4	1311	1138	+173	32	Qualification to second stage
3	Framasa Deportivo Coín	18	13	5	1398	1319	+79	31	Qualification to second stage
4	Jaén Paraíso Interior CB Andújar	18	9	9	1249	1250	−1	27	Qualification to second stage
5	CB Cazorla Jaén Paraíso Interior	18	9	9	1390	1330	+60	27	Qualification to second stage
6	Unicaja Andalucía B	18	7	11	1346	1413	−67	25	Qualification to relegation group
7	Ecoculture CB Almería	18	7	11	1358	1383	−25	25	Qualification to relegation group
8	CB Novaschool	18	7	11	1285	1386	−101	25	Qualification to relegation group
9	Multiópticas Baza	18	7	11	1319	1385	−66	25	Qualification to relegation group
10	Jaén Paraíso Interior CB Martos Montetucci	18	3	15	1208	1407	−199	21	Qualification to relegation group

Source: Liga EBA

===== Group D–B =====
Pos	Team	Pld	W	L	PF	PA	PD	Pts	Qualification
1	Enerdrink UDEA Algeciras	18	16	2	1509	1101	+408	34	Qualification to second stage
2	Benahavís Costa del Sol	18	14	4	1378	1270	+108	32	Qualification to second stage
3	Krypteia Capital Huelva	18	11	7	1312	1263	+49	29	Qualification to second stage
4	Alba Ibs Club Baloncesto Utrera	18	10	8	1374	1255	+119	28	Qualification to second stage
5	Oh!Tels ULB	18	10	8	1206	1285	−79	28	Qualification to second stage
6	DKV San Fernando	18	10	8	1308	1252	+56	28	Qualification to relegation group
7	Muser Auto	18	9	9	1353	1345	+8	27	Qualification to relegation group
8	Torta del Casar Extremadura	18	5	13	1236	1425	−189	23	Qualification to relegation group
9	Real Betis Energía Plus B	18	3	15	1239	1390	−151	21	Qualification to relegation group
10	CB San Fernando	18	2	16	1113	1442	−329	20	Qualification to relegation group

Source: Liga EBA

==== Second stage ====
===== Group D–Qualification =====
Pos	Team	Pld	W	L	PF	PA	PD	Pts	Qualification
1	CAM Enrique Soler	18	14	4	1504	1347	+157	32	Qualification to the Final Stage
2	CB Marbella	18	14	4	1309	1113	+196	32	Qualification to the Final Stage
3	Enerdrink UDEA Algeciras	18	12	6	1398	1163	+235	30	Qualification to the Final Stage
4	Benahavís Costa del Sol	18	9	9	1420	1468	−48	27	
5	CB Cazorla Jaén Paraíso Interior	18	8	10	1405	1465	−60	26	
6	Alba Ibs Club Baloncesto Utrera	18	7	11	1394	1422	−28	25	
7	Framasa Deportivo Coín	18	7	11	1413	1442	−29	25	
8	Krypteia Capital Huelva	18	7	11	1317	1403	−86	25	
9	Jaén Paraíso Interior CB Andújar	18	7	11	1239	1298	−59	25	
10	Oh!Tels ULB	18	5	13	1096	1374	−278	23	

Source: Liga EBA

===== Group D–Relegation =====
Pos	Team	Pld	W	L	PF	PA	PD	Pts	Relegation
1	DKV San Fernando	18	15	3	1428	1156	+272	33	
2	Ecoculture CB Almería	18	13	5	1336	1245	+91	31	
3	Unicaja Andalucía B	18	11	7	1354	1292	+62	29	
4	Muser Auto	18	11	7	1327	1277	+50	29	
5	CB Novaschool	18	9	9	1296	1298	−2	27	
6	Multiópticas Baza	18	9	9	1357	1362	−5	27	
7	Jaén Paraíso Interior CB Martos Montetucci	18	8	10	1342	1373	−31	26	
8	Real Betis Energía Plus B	18	7	11	1330	1352	−22	25	Relegation to Primera División
9	Torta del Casar Extremadura	18	5	13	1269	1416	−147	23	Relegation to Primera División
10	CB San Fernando	18	2	16	1135	1403	−268	20	Relegation to Primera División

Source: Liga EBA

=== Group E ===
17 teams were divided into two groups. The four first teams of each group joined the second stage, where the best three teams will join the final stage.

==== Regular season ====
===== Group E–A =====
Pos	Team	Pld	W	L	PF	PA	PD	Pts	Qualification
1	Refitel Bàsquet Llíria	14	13	1	1101	951	+150	27	Qualification to group E–1
2	Valencia BC B	14	13	1	1062	951	+111	27	Qualification to group E–1
3	Guillén Group Alginet	14	8	6	1101	1015	+86	22	Qualification to group E–1
4	CB Benicarló	14	8	6	1155	1099	+56	22	Qualification to group E–1
5	IPS Aldaia	14	4	10	916	1045	−129	18	Qualification to group E–2
6	Power Electronics Paterna	14	4	10	1011	1082	−71	18	Qualification to group E–2
7	CB Puerto Sagunto	14	4	10	999	1059	−60	18	Qualification to group E–2
8	Sonia Bath Godella	14	2	12	870	1013	−143	16	Qualification to group E–2

Source: Liga EBA

===== Group E–B =====
Pos	Team	Pld	W	L	PF	PA	PD	Pts	Qualification
1	Servigroup Benidorm	12	9	3	965	892	+73	21	Qualification to group E–1
2	Angels Vision UPB Gandía	12	9	3	996	912	+84	21	Qualification to group E–1
3	UCAM Murcia Jiffy B	12	7	5	881	847	+34	19	Qualification to group E–1
4	Hero Jairis	12	7	5	940	889	+51	19	Qualification to group E–1
5	Sha Wellness Clinic L'Alfàs	12	5	7	962	949	+13	17	Qualification to group E–2
6	UPCT Basket Cartagena	12	5	7	905	967	−62	17	Qualification to group E–2
7	Cartago Telecom Estudiantes Cartagena	12	0	12	849	1042	−193	12	Qualification to group E–2

Source: Liga EBA

==== Second stage ====
===== Group E–Qualification =====
Pos	Team	Pld	W	L	PF	PA	PD	Pts	Qualification
1	Angels Vision UPB Gandía	14	12	2	1136	1022	+114	26	Qualification to the Final Stage
2	CB Benicarló	14	9	5	1054	1018	+36	23	Qualification to the Final Stage
3	Hero Jairis	14	8	6	1027	1046	−19	22	Qualification to the Final Stage
4	Servigroup Benidorm	14	7	7	1074	1100	−26	21	
5	UCAM Murcia Jiffy B	14	6	8	1068	1062	+6	20	
6	Refitel Bàsquet Llíria	14	6	8	972	1026	−54	20	
7	Valencia BC B	14	4	10	1056	1071	−15	18	
8	Guillén Group Alginet	14	4	10	1053	1095	−42	18	

Source: Liga EBA

===== Group E–Relegation =====
Pos	Team	Pld	W	L	PF	PA	PD	Pts	Relegation
1	Sha Wellness Clinic L'Alfàs	12	9	3	985	945	+40	21	
2	Power Electronics Paterna	12	9	3	970	814	+156	21	
3	Sonia Bath Godella	12	8	4	859	798	+61	20	
4	IPS Aldaia	12	7	5	854	785	+69	19	
5	UPCT Basket Cartagena	12	6	6	842	804	+38	18	Relegation to Primera División
6	CB Puerto Sagunto	12	2	10	756	903	−147	14	Relegation to Primera División
7	Cartago Telecom Estudiantes Cartagena	12	1	11	827	1044	−217	13	Relegation to Primera División

Source: Liga EBA

== Promotion playoffs ==
The 16 qualified teams will be divided in four groups of four teams. The winner of each group will promote to LEB Plata. The four runners-up will play a repechage to decide two more promotion spots.

=== Group A – Ponferrada ===
==== Group 1 ====
Pos	Grp	Team	Pld	W	L	PF	PA	PD	Pts	Promotion or qualification
1	A1	Bierzo Fitness Dentomedic Ciudad de Ponferrada (H, P)	3	3	0	249	223	+26	6	Promotion to LEB Plata
2	B2	NCS Alcobendas (P)	3	2	1	225	210	+15	5	Repechage
3	D2	CB Marbella	3	1	2	209	229	−20	4	
4	E3	Hero Jairis	3	0	3	208	229	−21	3	

Source: Liga EBA
(H) Hosts; (P) Promoted

16 May 2019
18:15

Boxscore

CB Marbella	66–75	NCS Alcobendas

16 May 2019
20:30

Boxscore

Bierzo Fitness Dentomedic Ciudad de Ponferrada	83–76	Hero Jairis

17 May 2019
18:15

Boxscore

CB Marbella	72–66	Hero Jairis

17 May 2019
20:30

Boxscore

Bierzo Fitness Dentomedic Ciudad de Ponferrada	78–76	NCS Alcobendas

18 May 2019
18:15

Boxscore

Hero Jairis	66–74	NCS Alcobendas

18 May 2019
20:30

Boxscore

Bierzo Fitness Dentomedic Ciudad de Ponferrada	88–71	CB Marbella

==== Group 2 ====
Pos	Grp	Team	Pld	W	L	PF	PA	PD	Pts	Promotion or qualification
1	C2	Ilerdauto Nissan Pardinyes Lleida (P)	3	3	0	262	232	+30	6	Promotion to LEB Plata
2	E2	CB Benicarló	3	2	1	237	232	+5	5	Repechage
3	B1	Gran Canaria B	3	1	2	222	239	−17	4	
4	A4	Ucoga Seguros CB Chantada	3	0	3	218	236	−18	3	

Source: Liga EBA
(P) Promoted

19 May 2019
12:30

Gran Canaria B	73–90	Ilerdauto Nissan Pardinyes Lleida

16 May 2019
16:00

Boxscore

Ucoga Seguros CB Chantada	72–75	CB Benicarló

17 May 2019
12:00

Boxscore

Gran Canaria B	69–82	CB Benicarló

17 May 2019
16:00

Boxscore

Ilerdauto Nissan Pardinyes Lleida	81–79	Ucoga Seguros CB Chantada

18 May 2019
12:00

Boxscore

CB Benicarló	80–91	Ilerdauto Nissan Pardinyes Lleida

18 May 2019
16:00

Boxscore

Ucoga Seguros CB Chantada	67–80	Gran Canaria B

==== Repechage ====
19 May 2019
12:30

Boxscore

NCS Alcobendas	84–61	CB Benicarló

=== Group B – Algeciras ===
==== Group 3 ====
Pos	Grp	Team	Pld	W	L	PF	PA	PD	Pts	Promotion or qualification
1	D3	Enerdrink UDEA Algeciras (H, P)	3	2	1	233	217	+16	5	Promotion to LEB Plata
2	B3	Movistar Estudiantes B (P)	3	2	1	219	202	+17	5	Repechage
3	A2	Megacalzado Ardoi	3	1	2	192	208	−16	4	
4	C1	Ibersol CB Tarragona	3	1	2	223	240	−17	4	

Source: Liga EBA
(H) Hosts; (P) Promoted

16 May 2019
17:30

Boxscore

Ibersol CB Tarragona	62–71	Megacalzado Ardoi

16 May 2019
20:00

Boxscore

Enerdrink UDEA Algeciras	69–68	Movistar Estudiantes B

17 May 2019
17:30

Boxscore

Movistar Estudiantes B	84–72	Ibersol CB Tarragona

17 May 2019
20:00

Boxscore

Enerdrink UDEA Algeciras	79–60	Megacalzado Ardoi

18 May 2019
17:30

Boxscore

Megacalzado Ardoi	61–67	Movistar Estudiantes B

18 May 2019
20:00

Boxscore

Ibersol CB Tarragona	89–85	Enerdrink UDEA Algeciras

==== Group 4 ====
Pos	Grp	Team	Pld	W	L	PF	PA	PD	Pts	Promotion or qualification
1	A3	UBU Tizona (P)	3	2	1	210	179	+31	5	Promotion to LEB Plata
2	C3	Monbus CB Igualada	3	2	1	233	227	+6	5	Repechage
3	D1	CAM Enrique Soler	3	2	1	212	222	−10	5	
4	E1	Angels Vision UPB Gandía	3	0	3	211	238	−27	3	

Source: Liga EBA
(P) Promoted

16 May 2019
10:30

Boxscore

Angels Vision UPB Gandía	60–79	UBU Tizona

16 May 2019
13:00

Boxscore

CAM Enrique Soler	86–81	Monbus CB Igualada

17 May 2019
10:30

Boxscore

Monbus CB Igualada	77–72	Angels Vision UPB Gandía

17 May 2019
13:00

Boxscore

CAM Enrique Soler	44–62	UBU Tizona

18 May 2019
10:30

Boxscore

Angels Vision UPB Gandía	79–82	CAM Enrique Soler

18 May 2019
13:00

Boxscore

UBU Tizona	69–75	Monbus CB Igualada

==== Repechage ====
19 May 2019
13:00

Boxscore

Movistar Estudiantes B	54–48	Monbus CB Igualada
