= Jonas Paukštė =

Lithuanian basketball player (born 2000)

No. 55 – CB Zamora
- Position: Center
- League: Primera FEB

Personal information
- Born: September 10, 2000 (age 26) Vilnius, Lithuania
- Listed height: 2.24 m (7 ft 4 in)
- Listed weight: 120 kg (265 lb)

Career information
- NBA draft: 2022: undrafted
- Playing career: 2016–present

Career history
- 2016–2017: Lietuvos rytas-2 Vilnius (RKL)
- 2017–2018: Perlas Vilnius (NKL)
- 2018–2019: Saski Baskonia B (LEB Plata)
- 2019–2020: CB Clavijo (LEB Plata)
- 2020–2022: BC Šiauliai (LKL)
- 2021–2022: →BC Mažeikiai (NKL)
- 2022–2023: Neptūnas-Akvaservis (NKL)
- 2023–present: CB Zamora

Jonas Paukštė (born September 10, 2000) is a Lithuanian professional basketball player for CB Zamora of the Spanish Primera FEB. Being 2.24 meters (7 ft 4 in) in height as of 2020, he is one of the tallest Lithuanian basketball players of all time (even surpassing Arvydas Sabonis and Žydrūnas Ilgauskas).
