= CB Ciudad de Ponferrada =

Clínica Ponferrada SDP
- League: Segunda FEB
- Founded: 22 June 2002; 22 years ago
- Arena: Pabellón Lydia Valentín
- Capacity: 2,870
- Location: Ponferrada, Spain
- Team colors: Blue and white
- Website: www.ciudaddeponferrada.com
Home	Away

Club Baloncesto Ciudad de Ponferrada, also known as Clínica Ponferrada SDP for sponsorship reasons, is a basketball club based in Ponferrada, Spain. The team plays in the Segunda FEB. It home arena is the Pabellón Lydia Valentín.

== History ==
CB Ciudad de Ponferrada was founded in 2002 with the aim to replace the former team JT, that ceased in activity. The club started playing in the fifth tier and five years later, achieved their first promotion to Liga EBA. However, Ciudad de Ponferrada could not remain in the Liga EBA and was relegated again.

After some years between regional and provincial leagues, in 2013 the club failed to promote again in the final stage played in Ponferrada. However, two years later, Ciudad de Ponferrada achieved a vacant berth in the Liga EBA.

On 18 May 2019, Ciudad de Ponferrada achieved promotion to LEB Plata, tier three after leading the group A-B and finishing unbeaten in the final stage.

== Season by season ==
Season	Tier	Division	Pos.	W–L
2005–06	5	1ª División	3rd	19–5
2006–07	5	1ª División	2nd	27–6
2007–08	5	Liga EBA	14th	10–20
2008–09	6	1ª División	10th	7–17
2009–10	5	1ª División	6th	11–11
2010–11	5	1ª División	4th	15–7
2011–12	6	Provincial	9th	8–12
2012–13	6	Provincial	2nd	16–4
2013–14	5	1ª División	2nd	9–8
2014–15	5	1ª División	10th	2–16
2015–16	5	1ª División	6th (Note: Achieved a vacant place in Liga EBA.)	8–8
2016–17	4	Liga EBA	6th	15–11
2017–18	4	Liga EBA	11th (Note: Remained in the league after achieving a vacant berth.)	14–16
2018–19	4	Liga EBA	1st	23–7
2019–20	3	LEB Plata	12th (Note: Season curtailed due to the COVID-19 pandemic.)	12–13
2020–21	3	LEB Plata	7th	16–14
2021–22	3	LEB Plata	19th	12–14
2022–23	3	LEB Plata	8th	16–14
2023–24	3	LEB Plata	11th	15–13

== Notable players ==
Note: Flags indicate national team eligibility at FIBA-sanctioned events. Players may hold other non-FIBA nationalities not displayed.

Criteria

To appear in this section a player must have either:

- Set a club record or won an individual award while at the club
- Played at least one official international match for their national team at any time
- Played at least one official NBA match at any time.

- (Luxembourg) Alex Laurent
