= 2019–20 LEB Plata season =

LEB Plata
- Season: 2019–20
- Games played: 300
- Teams: 24

Regular season
- Promoted: Real Murcia; Bàsquet Girona; UBU Tizona
- Relegated: None (Note: Relegations to Liga EBA were revoked due to the COVID-19 pandemic.)

Finals
- Champions: Real Murcia (1st title)

Records
- Biggest home win: Murcia 92–49 Barça (19 October 2019)
- Biggest away win: Albacete 59–94 Girona (23 November 2019)
- Highest scoring: Zamora 107–103 ISB (18 January 2020)
- Winning streak: 9 games CB Marbella
- Losing streak: 7 games CB Benicarló; Zornotza ST; CB Villarrobledo

The 2019–20 LEB Plata season was the 20th season of the Spanish basketball third league. It started on 21 September 2019 with the first round of the regular season and was curtailed on 25 May 2020 due to the COVID-19 pandemic.

== Format changes ==
On 8 June 2019, the General Assembly of the Spanish Basketball Federation agreed to expand the promotion playoffs to eight teams, being these from the second to the ninth qualified of the Group A1 of the second stage and the winner of the Group A2.

In addition, every team must have always playing at least one Spanish player.

== Teams ==
=== Promotion and relegation (pre-season) ===
A total of 24 teams contested the league, including 15 sides from the 2018–19 season, three relegated from the 2018–19 LEB Oro and six promoted from the 2018–19 Liga EBA. On July 10, 2019, Círculo Gijón swapped place with Grupo Eleyco Baskonia B, JAFEP Fundación Globalcaja La Roda swapped place with Isover Basket Azuqueca, Gran Canaria B swapped place with NCS Alcobendas, and CB Benicarló and CB Marbella achieved the vacancies of Sáenz Horeca Araberri and Movistar Estudiantes B.

Teams relegated from LEB Oro

- CB Prat
- Barça B
- ~~Sáenz Horeca Araberri~~ (resigned)

Teams promoted from Liga EBA

- Ilerdauto Nissan Pardinyes Lleida
- CAT&REST Intragas-Clima CDP
- UBU Tizona
- Enerdrink UDEA Algeciras
- ~~NCS Alcobendas~~ (resigned to promotion)
- ~~Movistar Estudiantes B~~ (resigned to promotion)

Teams relegated to Liga EBA

- Círculo Gijón (swapped place with Grupo Eleyco Baskonia B)
- CB Extremadura Plasencia
- Ávila Auténtica Carrefour "El Bulevar"
- CB Vic Universitat de Vic
- ~~JAFEP Fundación Globalcaja La Roda~~ (swapped place with Isover Basket Azuqueca)
- Quesería La Antigua CB Tormes

Teams that applied to participate

- CB Benicarló
- Gran Canaria B (swapped place with NCS Alcobendas)
- CB Marbella

=== Venues and locations ===
Location of teams in 2019–20 LEB Plata
Red: Group East; Green: Group West.
Location of teams from the Canary Islands in 2019–20 LEB Plata
Red: Group East.

Team	Home city	Arena	Capacity
Arcos Albacete Basket	Albacete	Pabellón del Parque	1,200
Barça B	Sant Joan Despí	Ciutat Esportiva Joan Gamper	472
Basket Navarra	Pamplona	Arrosadia	1,500
Bàsquet Girona	Girona	Fontajau	5,500
Bodegas Rioja Vega	Logroño	Palacio de los Deportes	4,500
CAT&REST Intragas-Clima CDP	Ponferrada	Pabellón Lydia Valentín	2,500
CB Benicarló	Benicarló	Pavelló Poliesportiu Municipal	2,000
CB Marbella	Marbella	Carlos Cabezas	
CB Morón	Morón de la Frontera	Alameda	600
CB Prat	El Prat de Llobregat	Pavelló Joan Busquets	500
CB Villarrobledo	Villarrobledo	Los Pintores	
Círculo Gijón	Gijón	Palacio de Deportes	5,197
Enerdrink UDEA Algeciras	Algeciras	Pabellón Ciudad de Algeciras	2,300
Gran Canaria B	Las Palmas	Centro Insular de Deportes	5,200
Hestia Menorca	Mahón	Pavelló Menorca	5,115
Igualitorio Cantabria Estela	Santander	Palacio de Deportes	6,000
Ilerdauto Nissan Pardinyes Lleida	Lleida	Pavelló Barris Nord	6,100
Innova Chef	Zamora	Ángel Nieto	2,200
JAFEP Fundación Globalcaja La Roda	La Roda	Juan José Lozano Jareño	500
Juaristi ISB	Azpeitia	Municipal	1,000
Real Murcia	Murcia	Príncipe de Asturias	3,500
Torrons Vicens CB L'Hospitalet	L'Hospitalet	Nou Pavelló del Centre	700
UBU Tizona	Burgos	Polideportivo El Plantío	2,432
Zornotza ST	Amorebieta-Etxano	Larrea	600

== Season summary ==
On March 10, 2020, the Government of Spain decreed that all games would be played behind closed doors due to the COVID-19 pandemic. On March 12, 2020, the Spanish Basketball Federation postponed all the games of the next two weeks. On March 18, 2020, the Spanish Basketball Federation extended the postponement of the games until March 29 due to the state of alarm. On March 25, 2020, the Spanish Basketball Federation extended the postponement of the games until April 12 due to the extension of state of alarm.

On May 8, 2020, the Spanish Basketball Federation finished prematurely the regular season due to force majeure with the following decisions:

- Relegations to Liga EBA were revoked.
- Promotions to LEB Oro remained. Likewise, the promotions from Liga EBA remained, although, due to exceptional circumstances, the Spanish Basketball Federation reserved the right to expand the league to 28 teams in the next season, if necessary.
- The top team from Group A1 as of March 8 would promote directly to LEB Oro.
- Promotion playoffs would be played, as long as, on May 25, the Spanish Basketball Federation had the confirmation that it could be played before June 30, setting the health of the players as an absolute priority, and provided that it was certain that health authorities and clubs could comply with approved health protocols.
- Promotion playoffs would be as follows:
  - One game would be played between the 5th and 6th qualified teams of the Group A1 as of March 8. The winner of the game would play a game against the 2nd qualified team of the Group A1 as of March 8, and the winner of this game would promote directly to LEB Oro.
  - One game would be played between the 3rd and 4th qualified teams of the Group A1 as of March 8. The winner would promote directly to LEB Oro.
- If the sanitary conditions would make it impossible to play the promotion playoffs, the three top teams from Group A1 as of March 8 would promote to LEB Oro.

On May 25, 2020, the Spanish Basketball Federation cancelled the promotion playoffs and approved the promotions to LEB Oro of the three top teams.

== First phase ==
=== Group East ===
==== League table ====
Pos	Team	Pld	W	L	PF	PA	PD	Pts	Qualification
1	Real Murcia	22	16	6	1744	1589	+155	38	Qualification to Group A1
2	Bàsquet Girona	22	16	6	1748	1567	+181	38	Qualification to Group A1
3	Hestia Menorca	22	14	8	1723	1598	+125	36	Qualification to Group A1
4	CB Prat	22	14	8	1760	1726	+34	36	Qualification to Group A1
5	Gran Canaria B	22	11	11	1812	1789	+23	33	Qualification to Group A1
6	Barça B	22	11	11	1681	1622	+59	33	Qualification to Group A1
7	Torrons Vicens CB L'Hospitalet	22	11	11	1700	1712	−12	33	Qualification to Group A2
8	Arcos Albacete Basket	22	10	12	1741	1781	−40	32	Qualification to Group A2
9	Ilerdauto Nissan Pardinyes Lleida	22	9	13	1660	1732	−72	31	Qualification to Group A2
10	CB Villarrobledo	22	7	15	1686	1767	−81	29	Qualification to Group A2
11	JAFEP Fundación Globalcaja La Roda	22	7	15	1541	1730	−189	29	Qualification to Group A2
12	CB Benicarló	22	6	16	1536	1719	−183	28	Qualification to Group A2

Source: FEB

==== Positions by round ====
The table lists the positions of teams after completion of each round. In order to preserve chronological evolvements, any postponed matches are not included in the round at which they were originally scheduled, but added to the full round they were played immediately afterwards.

Team ╲ Round	1	2	3	4	5	6	7	8	9	10	11	12	13	14	15	16	17	18	19	20	21	22
Real Murcia	3	3	2	2	3	2	2	2	3	2	2	3	3	3	3	3	3	1	1	1	1	1
Bàsquet Girona	5	2	1	1	1	1	1	1	1	1	1	1	1	1	1	1	1	2	2	2	2	2
Hestia Menorca	8	6	7	5	4	4	3	3	2	3	4	4	4	4	4	4	4	4	4	4	4	3
CB Prat	1	1	4	3	2	3	4	4	4	4	3	2	2	2	2	2	2	3	3	3	3	4
Gran Canaria B	10	10	9	9	9	9	9	9	9	8	8	10	11	9	10	8	8	7	7	7	6	5
Barça B	6	4	3	4	7	7	7	8	6	7	6	7	7	5	5	5	6	6	6	6	7	6
Torrons Vicens L'Hospitalet	4	7	6	8	5	5	6	7	7	6	7	5	5	7	7	6	5	5	5	5	5	7
Arcos Albacete Basket	2	5	5	6	8	8	8	6	8	9	9	8	6	6	6	7	9	9	8	9	8	8
Ilerdauto Pardinyes Lleida	7	9	10	10	11	10	10	10	10	10	11	11	9	10	9	10	7	8	9	8	9	9
CB Villarrobledo	9	8	8	7	6	6	5	5	5	5	5	6	8	8	8	9	10	10	10	10	10	10
JAFEP Globalcaja La Roda	11	11	11	11	10	11	11	11	11	11	10	9	10	11	11	11	11	11	11	11	11	11
CB Benicarló	12	12	12	12	12	12	12	12	12	12	12	12	12	12	12	12	12	12	12	12	12	12

Qualification to Group A1
Qualification to Group A2

Source: FEB

==== Results ====
Home \ Away	ALB	BAR	GIR	BNC	PRA	VRO	GCA	MEN	PAR	ROD	MUR	HOS
Arcos Albacete Basket	—	75–67	59–94	86–67	83–91	77–74	100–80	70–77	91–89	90–69	81–94	76–81
Barça B	92–90	—	65–73	86–57	86–77	71–74	80–83	74–76	66–68	94–67	61–63	81–77
Bàsquet Girona	82–84	74–70	—	96–59	64–68	81–73	91–90	69–60	84–62	94–61	61–70	74–56
CB Benicarló	68–65	57–75	74–78	—	71–97	78–76	89–97	91–84	76–80	75–68	79–71	58–65
CB Prat	95–93	80–88	73–83	70–67	—	67–88	100–84	92–87	90–85	97–79	63–59	89–79
CB Villarrobledo	77–87	70–92	83–92	67–77	91–84	—	95–89	82–87	85–73	85–73	67–66	89–94
Gran Canaria B	74–78	80–73	86–76	84–78	61–69	82–80	—	88–76	98–82	83–75	84–99	71–72
Hestia Menorca	72–61	73–69	70–76	78–57	87–67	94–55	65–84	—	78–66	72–68	74–76	86–68
Ilerdauto Pardinyes Lleida	82–61	67–69	85–97	74–67	79–72	82–77	63–76	63–87	—	74–72	75–82	90–83
JAFEP Globalcaja La Roda	67–70	73–88	63–78	61–59	59–71	63–60	83–79	69–78	71–67	—	71–61	83–75
Real Murcia	85–75	92–49	83–70	87–71	76–77	76–70	79–77	83–79	71–63	109–73	—	77–74
Torrons Vicens L'Hospitalet	94–89	76–85	73–61	73–61	77–70	82–68	86–82	70–83	79–81	71–73	95–85	—

Source: FEB
Legend: Blue = home team win; Red = away team win.

=== Group West ===
==== League table ====
Pos	Team	Pld	W	L	PF	PA	PD	Pts	Qualification
1	UBU Tizona	22	15	7	1750	1735	+15	37	Qualification to Group A1
2	Igualitorio Cantabria Estela	22	13	9	1656	1625	+31	35	Qualification to Group A1
3	Juaristi ISB	22	13	9	1718	1624	+94	35	Qualification to Group A1
4	Innova Chef	22	13	9	1729	1710	+19	35	Qualification to Group A1
5	CAT&REST Intragas-Clima CDP	22	12	10	1708	1713	−5	34	Qualification to Group A1
6	Enerdrink UDEA Algeciras	22	11	11	1583	1550	+33	33	Qualification to Group A1
7	CB Marbella	22	11	11	1535	1556	−21	33	Qualification to Group A2
8	Bodegas Rioja Vega	22	10	12	1569	1591	−22	32	Qualification to Group A2
9	CB Morón	22	10	12	1652	1670	−18	32	Qualification to Group A2
10	Basket Navarra	22	9	13	1714	1712	+2	31	Qualification to Group A2
11	Círculo Gijón	22	8	14	1649	1737	−88	30	Qualification to Group A2
12	Zornotza ST	22	7	15	1605	1645	−40	29	Qualification to Group A2

Source: FEB

==== Positions by round ====
The table lists the positions of teams after completion of each round. In order to preserve chronological evolvements, any postponed matches are not included in the round at which they were originally scheduled, but added to the full round they were played immediately afterwards.

Team ╲ Round	1	2	3	4	5	6	7	8	9	10	11	12	13	14	15	16	17	18	19	20	21	22
UBU Tizona	3	8	5	4	2	3	3	3	3	3	2	2	2	1	1	1	1	1	1	1	1	1
Igualitorio Cantabria Estela	4	3	2	2	3	2	2	2	2	2	3	3	3	3	3	3	3	3	2	2	2	2
Juaristi ISB	1	1	1	1	1	1	1	1	1	1	1	1	1	2	2	2	2	2	3	3	4	3
Innova Chef	11	11	10	11	10	8	8	7	8	6	7	5	7	4	5	5	6	6	6	5	5	4
CAT&REST Intragas-Clima	10	10	12	12	12	12	10	11	11	12	10	12	10	9	6	4	4	4	4	4	3	5
Enerdrink UDEA Algeciras	7	9	11	10	11	10	11	8	9	8	9	9	4	7	8	9	9	8	8	9	8	6
CB Marbella	12	12	9	8	9	11	12	12	12	11	12	10	9	11	11	11	11	11	10	10	9	7
Bodegas Rioja Vega	2	5	6	9	8	9	9	10	10	9	6	7	11	10	7	6	5	5	5	6	7	8
CB Morón	9	6	7	6	5	6	5	4	5	5	5	6	6	6	9	8	8	7	7	8	6	9
Basket Navarra	6	2	4	5	7	4	6	5	4	4	4	4	5	5	4	7	7	9	9	7	10	10
Círculo Gijón	8	7	8	7	6	7	7	9	7	10	11	8	8	8	10	10	10	10	11	11	11	11
Zornotza ST	5	4	3	3	4	5	4	6	6	7	8	11	12	12	12	12	12	12	12	12	12	12

Qualification to Group A1
Qualification to Group A2

Source: FEB

==== Results ====
Home \ Away	NAV	CLA	PON	MAR	MOR	GIJ	UDE	EST	ZAM	ISB	UBU	ZOR
Basket Navarra	—	93–71	81–83	74–77	80–69	94–84	87–93	69–66	77–92	66–82	104–71	85–68
Bodegas Rioja Vega	76–66	—	71–88	51–57	74–61	81–72	81–65	69–82	79–55	72–81	71–82	59–52
CAT&REST Intragas-Clima	99–84	85–80	—	85–70	81–78	97–82	79–78	74–69	88–74	70–80	74–84	70–79
CB Marbella	59–63	53–60	68–62	—	62–72	70–66	93–76	58–60	85–53	52–79	89–83	75–72
CB Morón	70–86	78–67	96–78	89–81	—	70–62	75–60	64–75	76–70	78–84	75–85	77–73
Círculo Gijón	79–76	78–67	77–73	80–75	73–77	—	63–78	88–78	58–82	75–72	81–88	90–72
Enerdrink UDEA Algeciras	74–76	67–74	82–60	76–55	61–52	71–59	—	73–64	74–78	80–58	62–60	68–61
Igualitorio Cantabria Estela	73–62	75–83	80–76	63–66	84–74	78–100	67–78	—	90–74	74–72	75–69	85–81
Innova Chef	84–76	81–72	80–69	77–62	87–78	100–82	81–63	64–80	—	107–103	67–74	87–73
Juaristi ISB	78–70	79–70	66–71	70–63	82–89	84–62	66–56	90–95	89–74	—	71–72	78–63
UBU Tizona	83–75	79–90	94–78	59–76	91–86	81–73	84–79	70–69	87–84	91–78	—	91–85
Zornotza ST	81–70	62–51	60–68	86–89	74–68	73–65	77–69	71–74	75–78	74–76	93–72	—

Source: FEB
Legend: Blue = home team win; Red = away team win.

== Second phase ==
=== Group A1 ===
==== League table ====
Pos	Team	Pld	W	L	PF	PA	PD	Pts	Promotion
1	Real Murcia	13	11	2	1039	899	+140	24	Promotion to LEB Oro
2	Bàsquet Girona	13	9	4	973	937	+36	22	Promotion to LEB Oro
3	UBU Tizona	13	9	4	999	991	+8	22	Promotion to LEB Oro
4	CB Prat	13	9	4	992	987	+5	22	
5	Enerdrink UDEA Algeciras	13	7	6	971	924	+47	20	
6	Igualitorio Cantabria Estela	13	6	7	960	970	−10	19	
7	Barça B	13	5	8	946	952	−6	18	
8	Gran Canaria B	13	5	8	1036	1068	−32	18	
9	Innova Chef	13	5	8	998	1036	−38	18	
10	Hestia Menorca	13	4	9	985	1015	−30	17	
11	Juaristi ISB	13	4	9	969	1027	−58	17	
12	CAT&REST Intragas-Clima CDP	13	4	9	967	1029	−62	17	

Source: FEB

==== Positions by round ====
The table lists the positions of teams after completion of each round. In order to preserve chronological evolvements, any postponed matches are not included in the round at which they were originally scheduled, but added to the full round they were played immediately afterwards.

Team ╲ Round	S	1	2	3
Real Murcia	1	1	1	1
Bàsquet Girona	3	3	2	2
UBU Tizona	2	2	3	3
CB Prat	4	4	4	4
Enerdrink UDEA Algeciras	6	5	5	5
Igualitorio Cantabria Estela	5	6	6	6
Barça B	12	12	9	7
Gran Canaria B	7	7	7	8
Innova Chef	9	9	8	9
Hestia Menorca	11	11	11	10
Juaristi ISB	10	8	10	11
CAT&REST Intragas-Clima CDP	8	10	12	12

Promotion to LEB Oro
Qualification to promotion playoffs

Source: FEB

==== Results ====
Home \ Away	BAR	GIR	PON	PRA	UDE	GCA	MEN	EST	ZAM	ISB	MUR	UBU
Barça B	—	—		—		—	—				—	80–52
Bàsquet Girona	—	—		—		—	—			77–65	—	
CAT&REST Intragas-Clima CDP		83–85	—	72–77	—			—	—	—		—
CB Prat	—	—		—	72–66	—	—				—	
Enerdrink UDEA Algeciras			—		—	94–71	86–84	—	—	—		—
Gran Canaria B	—	—		—		—	—		60–77		—	
Hestia Menorca	—	—	80–73	—		—	—				—	
Igualitorio Cantabria Estela	65–69	54–74	—		—			—	—	—		—
Innova Chef	64–82		—	74–77	—			—	—	—		—
Juaristi ISB			—		—		78–74	—	—	—	53–86	—
Real Murcia	—	—		—		—	—	87–78			—	
UBU Tizona			—		—	89–88		—	—	—	73–86	—

Source: FEB
Legend: Blue = home team win; Red = away team win.

=== Group A2 ===
==== League table ====
Pos	Team	Pld	W	L	PF	PA	PD	Pts
1	Ilerdauto Nissan Pardinyes Lleida	13	10	3	1060	977	+83	23
2	Basket Navarra	13	8	5	1045	982	+63	21
3	Arcos Albacete Basket	13	8	5	1047	1019	+28	21
4	CB Marbella	13	8	5	925	924	+1	21
5	Torrons Vicens CB L'Hospitalet	13	7	6	992	974	+18	20
6	CB Morón	13	7	6	953	970	−17	20
7	Bodegas Rioja Vega	13	6	7	884	881	+3	19
8	Zornotza ST	13	6	7	958	973	−15	19
9	JAFEP Fundación Globalcaja La Roda	13	6	7	909	948	−39	19
10	CB Benicarló	13	5	8	906	965	−59	18
11	Círculo Gijón	13	4	9	962	979	−17	17
12	CB Villarrobledo	13	3	10	995	1044	−49	16

Source: FEB

==== Positions by round ====
The table lists the positions of teams after completion of each round. In order to preserve chronological evolvements, any postponed matches are not included in the round at which they were originally scheduled, but added to the full round they were played immediately afterwards.

Team ╲ Round	S	1	2	3
Ilerdauto Nissan Pardinyes Lleida	1	1	1	1
Basket Navarra	2	2	3	2
Arcos Albacete Basket	4	3	2	3
CB Marbella	7	5	5	4
Torrons Vicens CB L'Hospitalet	3	4	4	5
CB Morón	5	7	7	6
Bodegas Rioja Vega	6	8	10	7
Zornotza ST	10	11	8	8
JAFEP Fundación Globalcaja La Roda	8	6	6	9
CB Benicarló	11	9	9	10
Círculo Gijón	9	10	11	11
CB Villarrobledo	12	12	12	12

Qualification to promotion playoffs
Relegation to Liga EBA

Source: FEB

==== Results ====
Home \ Away	ALB	NAV	CLA	BNC	MAR	MOR	VRO	GIJ	PAR	ROD	HOS	ZOR
Arcos Albacete Basket	—			—		100–86	—		—	—	—	
Basket Navarra	81–80	—	—		—	—	102–79	—				—
Bodegas Rioja Vega	74–75	—	—	96–61	—	—		—				—
CB Benicarló	—			—	71–73		—		—	—	—	
CB Marbella		—	—		—	—		—		76–65	78–75	—
CB Morón		—	—		—	—		—			71–47	—
CB Villarrobledo	—			—			—	69–64	—	—	—	
Círculo Gijón		—	—		—	—		—	75–78	74–77		—
Ilerdauto Nissan Pardinyes Lleida	—	89–75		—		91–65	—		—	—	—	
JAFEP Fundación Globalcaja La Roda	—			—			—		—	—	—	67–72
Torrons Vicens CB L'Hospitalet	—		73–57	—			—		—	—	—	
Zornotza ST		—	—	81–88	—	—	92–89	—				—

Source: FEB
Legend: Blue = home team win; Red = away team win.

== Copa LEB Plata ==
The Copa LEB Plata was played on 28 December 2019, by the first qualified team of each group after the end of the first half of the season (round 11 of first phase). The champion of the cup would play the promotion playoffs against the worst qualified if it would finished the league between the second and the fifth qualified of the Group A1.

=== Teams qualified ===
Pos	Grp	Team	Pld	W	L	PF	PA	PD	Pts
1	East	Bàsquet Girona	11	9	2	885	748	+137	20
1	West	Juaristi ISB (H)	11	9	2	867	760	+107	20

Source: FEB
(H) Hosts

=== Game ===
28 December 2019	Juaristi ISB	74–69	Bàsquet Girona	Azpeitia
19:00	Scoring by quarter: 19–20, 10–17, 18–18, 27–14
	Pts: Reaves 21; Rebs: Guridi 8 Asts: Guridi 5 Eff: Lowrance 22	Boxscore	Pts: Sàbat 17; Rebs: Sevillano 10; Asts: Sàbat 4 Eff: Sàbat 15	Arena: Municipal; Referees: Báez Batista, Ávila Zurita

== Awards ==
All official awards of the 2019–20 LEB Plata season.

=== Copa LEB Plata MVP ===
Pos.	Player	Team
SG	(United States) Spencer Reaves	Juaristi ISB

=== Player of the round ===
==== First phase ====
Round	Player	Team	Eff.	Ref
1	(United States) Andrew Kelly	Enerdrink UDEA Algeciras	35	
2	(Canada) Jamal Reynolds	Círculo Gijón	44	
3	(United States) Antonio Hester	Bàsquet Girona	39	
4	(United States) Andre Norris	Real Murcia	45	
5	(Dominican Republic) Eddy Polanco	Arcos Albacete Basket	44	
6	(Spain) Víctor Moreno	Bàsquet Girona	33	
7	(United States) Spencer Reaves	Juaristi ISB	31	
8	(United States) Ryan Nicholas	Innova Chef	34	
9	(Spain) Urko Otegi	Hestia Menorca	39	
10	(Spain) Ayoze Alonso	UBU Tizona	35	
11	(Spain) Eduardo Hernández-Sonseca	Basket Navarra	42	
12	(Spain) Gerard Sevillano	Bàsquet Girona	28	
12	(Spain) Javi Lucas	Igualitorio Cantabria Estela	28	
13	(Spain) Javi Menéndez	Círculo Gijón	36	
14	(Nigeria) Ryan Ejim	Arcos Albacete Basket	32	
15	(Spain) Gerard Sevillano (2)	Bàsquet Girona	30	
15	(Spain) Marcos Portález	Bodegas Rioja Vega	30	
16	(United States) Sean McDonnell	CAT&REST Intragas-Clima CDP	34	
17	(Nigeria) Jeff Solarin	Real Murcia	39	
18	(Jamaica) Clint Robinson	Real Murcia	36	
19	(Nigeria) Ryan Ejim (2)	Arcos Albacete Basket	32	
20	(United States) Wendell Davis	Ilerdauto Nissan Pardinyes Lleida	34	
21	(Spain) Eduardo Hernández-Sonseca (2)	Basket Navarra	33	
22	(United States) Sean McDonnell (2)	CAT&REST Intragas-Clima CDP	36	

==== Second phase ====
Round	Player	Team	Eff.	Ref
1	(Nigeria) Jeff Solarin (2)	Real Murcia	37	
1	(United States) Andrew Kelly (2)	Enerdrink UDEA Algeciras	37	
2	(United States) Sean McDonnell (3)	CAT&REST Intragas-Clima CDP	30	
2	(Argentina) Leandro Bolmaro	Barça B	30	
2	(Spain) Alfonso Ortiz	Arcos Albacete Basket	30	
3	(United States) Sean McDonnell (4)	CAT&REST Intragas-Clima CDP	40	
