= CB Zamora =

- Leagues: Primera FEB
- Founded: 1978
- Arena: Pabellón Ángel Nieto
- Capacity: 2,100
- Location: Zamora, Spain
- Team colors: Blue and white
- President: Gerardo Hernández
- Head coach: Saulo Hernández
| Home | Away |

Club Baloncesto Zamora, also known as Caja Rural CB Zamora for sponsorship reasons, is a basketball club based in Zamora, Castile and León that currently plays in Primera FEB, the second tier of Spanish basketball.

== History ==
Founded in 1978, CB Zamora was promoted for the first time to the second tier in 1992.

CB Zamora was the only club to have played all Liga EBA seasons until 2016, when the club requested a vacant berth in LEB Plata that finally, the Spanish Basketball Federation granted them.

== Sponsorship naming ==
- Zamora CF 1978–1980
- Zamora Citroën 1980–1981
- Frinca Zamora 1981–1986
- Riespri Zamora 1986–1987
- Caja España Zamora 1987–1990
- Arcos Zamora 1990–1992
- Pan de Azúcar 1992–1993
- Vino de Toro 1993–1996
- Caja España Zamora 1996–2002
- UFC Zamora 2002–2007
- UFC INEC Zamora 2007–2008
- Grupo INEC Zamora 2008–2011
- Grupo INEC Queso Zamorano 2011–2015
- HiLed Queso Zamorano 2015–2017
- Aquimisa Laboratorios 2017–2019
- Innova Chef 2019–2021
- Zamora Enamora 2021–2024
- Caja Rural CB Zamora 2024–present

== Players ==
=== Current roster ===
Note: Flags indicate national team eligibility at FIBA-sanctioned events. Players may hold other non-FIBA nationalities not displayed.

CB Zamora roster
Players
Coaches

| Pos. | No. | Nat. | Name | Ht. | Age |
|---|---|---|---|---|---|
| C | 1 | (Spain) | González, Asier | 2.05 m (6 ft 9 in) | 26 – 20 April 2000 |
| SG | 2 | (Dominican Republic) | Rivera, Isaiah | 1.96 m (6 ft 5 in) | 25 – 24 September 2001 |
| PG | 3 | (United States) | Roberts, Tyrell | 1.80 m (5 ft 11 in) | 27 – 2 September 1999 |
| G | 4 | (United Kingdom) | Round, Jacob | 1.92 m (6 ft 4 in) | 26 – 3 April 2000 |
| G/F | 7 | (Serbia) (Bosnia and Herzegovina) | Nešković, Dušan | 2.03 m (6 ft 8 in) | 26 – 20 October 2000 |
| PF | 9 | (Sweden) | Palmquist, Oskar | 2.01 m (6 ft 7 in) | 26 – 5 May 2000 |
| G | 10 | (Spain) | Isern, Pau | 1.90 m (6 ft 3 in) | 24 – 13 November 2001 |
| SF | 12 | (Spain) | Carralero, Jesús | 2.01 m (6 ft 7 in) | 26 – 24 July 2000 |
| G | 13 | (United States) | Blackshear, Kenan | 1.97 m (6 ft 6 in) | 25 – 30 May 2001 |
| PF | 14 | (Denmark) | Kristensen, David | 2.03 m (6 ft 8 in) | 28 – 25 August 1998 |
| C | 21 | (Spain) | Tamba, Ismael | 2.04 m (6 ft 8 in) | 25 – 19 July 2001 |
| SF | 25 | (Spain) | Jordá, Álex | 1.93 m (6 ft 4 in) | 31 – 13 September 1995 |
| PF | 30 | (Spain) (United States) | Báez, Bryce | 2.01 m (6 ft 7 in) | 23 – 3 December 2002 |

Head coach

- (Spain) Saulo Hernández

Legend

- (C) Team captain
- Injured

- Roster
Updated: November 6, 2026

=== Depth chart ===
| Pos. | Starting 5 | Bench 1 | Bench 2 |
|---|---|---|---|
| C | Asier González | Ismael Tamba |
| PF | David Kristensen | Oskar Pamquist | Bryce Báez |
| SF | Jesús Carralero | Álex Jordá | Dušan Nešković |
| SG | Isaiah Rivera | Kenan Blackshear |
| PG | Ty Roberts | Pau Isern | Jacob Round |

Colours: Blue = homegrown player; Red = non–FIBA Europe player

== Season by season ==
| Season | Tier | Division | Pos. | W–L | Cup competitions | |
|---|---|---|---|---|---|---|
| 1989–90 | 3 | 2ª División | 1st | 21–6 | | |
| 1990–91 | 3 | 2ª División | 3rd | 21–5 | | |
| 1991–92 | 3 | 2ª División | 2nd | 32–6 | | |
| 1992–93 | 2 | 1ª División | 31st (Note: Remained in the league due to the existence of vacant berths.) | 5–25 | | |
| 1993–94 | 2 | 1ª División | 29th | 12–18 | | |
| 1994–95 | 2 | Liga EBA | 2nd | 22–10 | | |
| 1995–96 | 2 | Liga EBA | 6th | 16–16 | | |
| 1996–97 | 3 | Liga EBA | 10th | 10–19 | | |
| 1997–98 | 3 | Liga EBA | 7th | 15–13 | | |
| 1998–99 | 3 | Liga EBA | 10th | 15–13 | | |
| 1999–00 | 3 | Liga EBA | 4th | 16–10 | | |
| 2000–01 | 4 | Liga EBA | 12th | 13–17 | | |
| 2001–02 | 4 | Liga EBA | 11th | 15–19 | | |
| 2002–03 | 4 | Liga EBA | 14th | 9–21 | | |
| 2003–04 | 4 | Liga EBA | 11th | 12–18 | | |
| 2004–05 | 4 | Liga EBA | 12th | 11–19 | | |
| 2005–06 | 4 | Liga EBA | 7th | 15–15 | | |
| 2006–07 | 4 | Liga EBA | 7th | 14–12 | | |
| 2007–08 | 5 | Liga EBA | 13th | 10–20 | | |
| 2008–09 | 5 | Liga EBA | 8th | 13–15 | | |
| 2009–10 | 4 | Liga EBA | 10th | 10–16 | | |
| 2010–11 | 4 | Liga EBA | 9th | 12–10 | | |
| 2011–12 | 4 | Liga EBA | 10th | 11–11 | | |
| 2012–13 | 4 | Liga EBA | 5th | 13–7 | | |
| 2013–14 | 4 | Liga EBA | 2nd | 19–6 | | |
| 2014–15 | 4 | Liga EBA | 4th | 19–7 | | |
| 2015–16 | 4 | Liga EBA | 4th (Note: Achieved a vacant berth in LEB Plata.) | 20–9 | | |
| 2016–17 | 3 | LEB Plata | 12th | 11–19 | | |
| 2017–18 | 3 | LEB Plata | 14th (Note: Remained in the league after achieving one of the places after the expansion of the LEB Plata.) | 10–20 | | |
| 2018–19 | 3 | LEB Plata | 8th | 17–17 | Copa LEB Plata | RU |
| 2019–20 | 3 | LEB Plata | 9th (Note: Season curtailed due to the COVID-19 pandemic.) | 14–11 | | |
| 2020–21 | 3 | LEB Plata | 16th | 12–16 | | |
| 2021–22 | 3 | LEB Plata | 7th | 17–1–12 | | |
| 2022–23 | 3 | LEB Plata | 9th | 15–1–14 | | |
| 2023–24 | 3 | LEB Plata | 2nd | 29–3 | Copa LEB Plata | C |
| 2024–25 | 2 | Primera FEB | 14th | 13–21 | Spain Cup | GS |
| 2025–26 | 2 | Primera FEB | 10th | 15–17 | Spain Cup | R32 |
| 2026–27 | 2 | Primera FEB | | | Spain Cup | R32 |
