= CB Pardinyes =

Ilerdauto Nissan Pardinyes Lleida
- Leagues: LEB Plata
- Founded: 1966
- Arena: Barris Nord
- Capacity: 6,100
- Location: Lleida, Spain
- Team colors: Yellow and black
- President: Pere Roqué
- Head coach: Xavier Mendiburu
- Championships: 1 Liga EBA
- Website: cbpardinyes.com
Home

Club Bàsquet Pardinyes, also known as Ilerdauto Nissan Pardinyes Lleida by sponsorship reasons, is a basketball team based in the neighbourhood of Pardinyes in Lleida, Catalonia, that currently plays in LEB Plata.

== History ==
Founded in 1966, Pardinyes started playing in provincial leagues. In 2013, the club promoted to Liga EBA after achieving five consecutive promotions in six years.

In 2017, the club reached the promotion playoffs but failed in the final stage but, two seasons later, the club would complete the best performance of the league thus achieving promotion to LEB Plata on 18 May 2019 and being named as champions of the Liga EBA.

== Season by season ==
Season	Tier	Division	Pos.	W–L
2008–09	9	3ª Catalana	2nd	24–6
2009–10	7	2ª Catalana	4th	19–11
2010–11	6	1ª Catalana	10th	10–16
2011–12	6	1ª Catalana	1st	28–2
2012–13	5	Copa Catalunya	1st	24–9
2013–14	4	Liga EBA	9th	7–13
2014–15	4	Liga EBA	11th	11–15
2015–16	4	Liga EBA	17th	14–14
2016–17	4	Liga EBA	2nd	21–10
2017–18	4	Liga EBA	2nd	19–9
2018–19	4	Liga EBA	1st	25–6
2019–20	3	LEB Plata	13th (Note: Season curtailed due to the COVID-19 pandemic.)	12–13

== Honours ==
- Liga EBA: (1)
  - 2018–19
