= CB Tizona =

Grupo Ureta Tizona Burgos
- Nickname: Tizona
- League: Primera FEB
- Founded: 2013
- Arena: Polideportivo El Plantío
- Capacity: 2,432
- Location: Burgos, Spain
- Team colors: Blue and orange
- Main sponsor: Grupo Ureta Automóviles
- President: Miguel Ángel Benavente
- General manager: Vicente Sebastián
- Head coach: Lluís Riera
- Championships: 2 LEB Oro; 2 Copa Castilla y León
- Website: cbtizona.es
Home	Away	Third

Club Baloncesto Tizona S.A.D., more commonly known as UBU Tizona by sponsorship reasons, is a Spanish professional basketball team based in Burgos, Castilla y León. The team plays their home games in the Polideportivo El Plantío, and currently competes in the Primera FEB, the second division of Spain.

== History ==
The club started in 2013 as the successor of CB Atapuerca, dissolved after failing to promote to Liga ACB, due to not fulfilling all the requirements.

The name is a homage to former CB Espada Tizona, the main club in Burgos during the 1970s and the 1980s, and was created as a Sociedad Anónima Deportiva with the aim to make easier a future promotion to ACB, goal achieved in its first season. Named Ford Burgos like its predecessor, the club promoted to Liga ACB in the 2013–14 season and did not fulfill all the necessary requirements to enter in the top flight, joining again the LEB Oro league.

In its second season, Tizona promoted again to Liga ACB, this time as LEB Oro champion, after winning its last 13 games in a row. Despite it was the third time in a row Burgos had a team which promoted to the top league, it could not fulfill the requirements to join it.

After failing in its second attempt, the club sued the ACB for not admitting it in the league and decided not entering any competition with the professional LEB Oro team. and continued its activity with the youth teams. The team that acted as reserve teams in the previous seasons, became the main senior team and played in Primera División. Tizona also changed its traditional blue uniform to a red-and-white one for the 2015–16 season, but came back to the blue in the next one for playing in Liga EBA, after its promotion as champions of the Regional group of Primera División.

In July 2017, thanks to the denounce of CB Tizona, local team San Pablo Burgos and Gipuzkoa Basket could promote to Liga ACB.

On 18 May 2019, Tizona came back to professional basketball by achieving promotion to LEB Plata, after winning one of the four groups of the final stage. Just one season later, the club came back to LEB Oro five years later, after the 2019–20 LEB Plata season was curtailed due to the COVID-19 pandemic and Tizona was qualified in the third position when the league was suspended.

== Sponsorship naming ==
- (Autocid) Ford Burgos 2013–2015
- Universidad de Burgos 2015–2018
- UBU Tizona 2018–present

== Players ==
=== Current roster ===
Note: Flags indicate national team eligibility at FIBA-sanctioned events. Players may hold other non-FIBA nationalities not displayed.

CB Tizona roster
Players
Coaches

Pos.	No.	Nat.	Name	Ht.	Age
G	1	(Spain)	Cabrera, Alberto	1.91 m (6 ft 3 in)	27 – 5 October 1998
G	2	(United States)	Tate, Jalen	1.98 m (6 ft 6 in)	28 – 18 June 1998
G	4	(Denmark)	Aris, Sebastian	1.89 m (6 ft 2 in)	30 – 9 December 1995
F	5	(Georgia (country))	Phevadze, Aleksandre	2.03 m (6 ft 8 in)	28 – 15 April 1998
PF	7	(Switzerland) (Croatia)	Ročak, Niko	2.06 m (6 ft 9 in)	25 – 21 February 2001
F	9	(Spain)	Urdiain, Ander	2.03 m (6 ft 8 in)	25 – 16 November 2000
PG	11	(Ivory Coast)	Cisse, Jonathan	1.84 m (6 ft 0 in)	35 – 29 January 1991
F/C	12	(Ivory Coast)	Echui, Chris	2.03 m (6 ft 8 in)	17 – 3 November 2008
F	15	(Spain)	Hernández, Pablo	2.01 m (6 ft 7 in)	29 – 17 February 1997
G	24	(Spain)	Huelves, Andy	1.93 m (6 ft 4 in)	19 – 10 March 2007
C	31	(Canada)	Brown, Javonte	2.12 m (6 ft 11 in)	24 – 19 September 2002
F	33	(Spain)	Alonso, Totte	2.02 m (6 ft 8 in)	25 – 1 April 2001
G/F	35	(Sweden)	Czerapowicz, Chris (C)	2.01 m (6 ft 7 in)	35 – 15 September 1991
G	55	(Spain)	Jofresa, Gerard	1.86 m (6 ft 1 in)	25 – 20 March 2001

Head coach

- (Spain) Denís Pombar

Assistant coach(es)

- (Spain) Ricardo Rey
- (Spain) Alberto García

Physiotherapist(s)

- (Spain) Alejandro Liendo

Legend

- (C) Team captain
- Injured

- Roster
Updated: September 26, 2026

=== Depth chart ===
Pos.	Starting 5	Bench 1	Bench 2
C	Javonte Brown	Chris Echui
PF	Aleksandre Phevadze	Niko Ročak	Totte Alonso
SF	Ander Urdiain	Chris Czerapowicz	Pablo Hernández
SG	Jalen Tate	Alberto Cabrera	Sebastian Aris
PG	Gerard Jofresa	Andy Huelves	Jonathan Cisse

== Season by season ==
Season	Tier	Division	Pos.	W–L	Cup competitions	
2013–14	2	LEB Oro	2nd (Note: Did not promote to ACB after failing to fulfill the requirements to join the league.)	27–8		
2014–15	2	LEB Oro	1st (Note: Did not promote to ACB after failing to fulfill the requirements to join the league, and resigned to continue playing in LEB Oro for requesting their place in ACB judicially.)	22–6		
2015–16	5	1ª División	1st	14–2		
2016–17	4	Liga EBA	10th	8–18		
2017–18	4	Liga EBA	7th	16–14		
2018–19	4	Liga EBA	2nd	25–4		
2019–20	3	LEB Plata	3rd (Note: Season curtailed due to the COVID-19 pandemic.)	16–9		
2020–21	2	LEB Oro	9th	5–11		
2021–22	3	LEB Plata	4th	16–10		
2022–23	3	LEB Plata	1st	25–3	Copa LEB Plata	C
2023–24	2	LEB Oro	5th	28–12		
2024–25	2	Primera FEB	9th	15–22	Spain Cup	GS
2025–26	2	Primera FEB	13th	10–22	Spain Cup	QF

== Head coaches ==
- Andreu Casadevall 2013–2015
- José Luis Cubillo 2015–2017, 2018–2020
- Juan Carlos García 2017–2018
- José Manuel Naveira 2018
- Jorge Elorduy 2020
- Lluís Riera 2020–present

== Honors ==
=== Trophies ===
- LEB Oro: (1)
  - 2014–15
- Copa Castilla y León: (2)
  - 2013, 2014

=== Individual awards ===
All LEB Oro Team

- Pep Ortega – 2014
- Taylor Coppenrath – 2015
