= Carbajosa de la Sagrada =

- Municipality
- Coat of arms

- Location in Salamanca

- Location in Spain
- Coordinates: 40°55′59″N 5°39′05″W
- Country: Spain
- Autonomous community: Castile and León
- Province: Salamanca
- Comarca: Campo de Salamanca

Government
  - Mayor: Pedro Samuel Martín García (People's Party)

Area
  - Total: 14 km^{2} (5.4 sq mi)
- Elevation: 789 m (2,589 ft)

Population (2025-01-01)
  - Total: 7,791
  - Density: 560/km^{2} (1,400/sq mi)
- Time zone: UTC+1 (CET)
  - Summer (DST): UTC+2 (CEST)
- Postal code: 37188

Carbajosa de la Sagrada is a municipality in Salamanca province, western Spain, part of the autonomous community of Castile-Leon. It is located 4 kilometres (2.5 mi) from the city of Salamanca and as of 2016 had a population of 6,790 people. The municipality covers an area of 14 km^{2} (5.4 sq mi).

The village lies 789 metres (2,589 ft) above sea level.
