= CB Marbella =

- Leagues: LEB Plata
- Founded: 1984
- Arena: Carlos Cabezas
- Capacity: 500
- Location: Marbella, Spain
- Team colors: Blue and white
- Head coach: Rafa Piña
- Website: cbmarbella.com
Home	Away

Club Baloncesto Marbella, is a professional basketball team based in Marbella, Andalusia, that currently plays in LEB Plata.

== History ==
Founded in 1984, CB Marbella decided to join the fifth tier in 2016. After only one season, the club decided to go one step further and achieved a vacant spot in Liga EBA in 2017.

In its first season, the club qualified to the final stage but could not achieve promotion. Despite failing again in the final stage of their second season in the league, the club would be elected to cover one vacant place in LEB Plata, third tier.

== Season by season ==
Season	Tier	Division	Pos.	W–L
2015–16	6	Provincial	8th (Note: Registered for playing in Primera División.)	14–13
2016–17	5	1ª División	6th (Note: Achieved a vacant place in Liga EBA.)	16–10
2017–18	4	Liga EBA	2nd	22–7
2018–19	4	Liga EBA	2nd (Note: Achieved a vacant place in LEB Plata.)	23–8
2019–20	3	LEB Plata	16th (Note: Season curtailed due to the COVID-19 pandemic.)	14–11
