= Basket Navarra Club =

Basket Navarra
- Leagues: LEB Plata
- Founded: 2007
- Arena: Pabellón de Arrosadia
- Capacity: 1,500
- Location: Pamplona, Spain
- Team colors: Green and white
- President: José Javier Sobrino
- Head coach: Xabi Jiménez
- Website: www.basketnavarraclub.com
Home	Away

Basket Navarra Club is a professional Basketball team based in Pamplona, Navarra. The team currently plays in league LEB Plata.

== History ==
Basket Navarra Club was founded in 2007 with the aim of creating a professional basketball team in Navarra. The club played its first year at LEB Bronce, league created in that season as the fourth division in Spanish basketball.

After this first year, the club achieved a vacant berth in LEB Plata. In their second season at this league, the club played the semifinals of the promotion playoffs, but were defeated by CB Tíjola.

On 2010, Basket Navarra Club clinched the spot of Bàsquet Mallorca at LEB Oro, the second division. Navarra reached the promotion playoffs to Liga ACB but were defeated by Ford Burgos in the quarterfinals round by 3–1. The next season, the 2011–12 was the best one in the history of the club, reaching the semifinals of the promotion playoffs to Liga ACB.

In 2014, due to the existence of vacant berths, Navarra remained in LEB Oro despite being qualified in the last position after a season marked as "an absurdity".

Two years later, Navarra was again relegated to LEB Plata, this time not remaining in LEB Oro.

== Home arenas ==
- Polideportivo Arrosadia 2007–2009, 2018–present
- Polideportivo Anaitasuna 2009–2016
- Pabellón Universitario de Navarra 2016–2018

== Sponsorship naming ==
Former logo, until January 2012

Basket Navarra Club had several denominations through the years due to its sponsorship:

- HNV-Consmetal Navarra: 2007–08
- HNV Duar Navarra: 2008–09
- Grupo Iruña Navarra: 2009–12
- Planasa Navarra: 2012–2016
- AECC Navarra: 2016 (Note: Planasa loaned the sponsorship to the Spanish Association Against Cancer for one game of the 2015–16 season."Planasa cede su patrocinio a AECC Navarra para la próxima jornada" (in Spanish). Diario de Navarra. 30 January 2016.)

== Season by season ==
Season	Tier	Division	Pos.	W–L
2007–08	4	LEB Bronce	8th (Note: After the dissolution of LEB Bronce, the club is invited to play at LEB Plata.)	17–17
2008–09	3	LEB Plata	6th	20–14
2009–10	3	LEB Plata	4th	20–20
2010–11	2	LEB Oro	8th (Note: Achieved the vacant berth of Bàsquet Mallorca, who played at LEB Plata due to administrative problems.)	19–19
2011–12	2	LEB Oro	4th	24–17
2012–13	2	LEB Oro	11th	10–16
2013–14	2	LEB Oro	14th (Note: Remained in the LEB Oro after achieving a vacant place.)	5–21
2014–15	2	LEB Oro	7th	15–15
2015–16	2	LEB Oro	15th	10–20
2016–17	3	LEB Plata	9th	15–18
2017–18	3	LEB Plata	9th	17–18
2018–19	3	LEB Plata	6th	22–12
2019–20	3	LEB Plata	14th (Note: Season curtailed due to the COVID-19 pandemic.)	11–14

== Trophies and awards ==
=== Individual awards ===
LEB Oro MVP

- Ondřej Starosta – 2013
- Óliver Arteaga – 2016

All-LEB Oro Team

- Ondřej Starosta – 2013
- Pablo Almazán – 2015
- Óliver Arteaga – 2016

== Current roster ==
Note: Flags indicate national team eligibility at FIBA-sanctioned events. Players may hold other non-FIBA nationalities not displayed.

Basket Navarra roster
Players
Coaches

Pos.	No.	Nat.	Name	Ht.	Age
PG	9	(Spain)	Antúnez, Lucas	1.91 m (6 ft 3 in)	30 – 14 June 1995
SG	5	(Spain)	Artiles, Alberto	1.92 m (6 ft 4 in)	28 – 24 February 1997
SF	13	(Spain)	García, Adrián	2.00 m (6 ft 7 in)	40 – 2 February 1985
PF		(Bulgaria)	Lepichev, Simeon	2.06 m (6 ft 9 in)	30 – 9 January 1995
PF		(Spain)	Llopis, Rafa	2.02 m (6 ft 8 in)	32 – 28 June 1993
SG	15	(Spain)	Narros, Iñaki	1.94 m (6 ft 4 in)	44 – 28 May 1981
SF	8	(Spain)	Seoane, Rodrigo	2.02 m (6 ft 8 in)	25 – 16 August 1999
C		(United States Virgin Islands)	Smith, LaRon	2.04 m (6 ft 8 in)	31 – 20 December 1993
PG	4	(Sweden)	Stümer, Peter	1.98 m (6 ft 6 in)	26 – 11 March 1999
SG	12	(Spain)	Yárnoz, Pablo	1.94 m (6 ft 4 in)	29 – 28 March 1996

Head coach

- (Spain) Jordi Juste

Legend

- (C) Team captain
- Injured
