= UDEA Baloncesto =

Damex UDEA Algeciras
- Leagues: LEB Plata
- Founded: 2017
- Arena: Doctor Juan Carlos Mateo
- Capacity: 2,300
- Location: Algeciras, Spain
- Team colors: Navy and white
- President: Alvaro Orduña
- Head coach: Javier Malla
- Website: udeaalgeciras.es
Home	Away

Club Deportivo UDEA Baloncesto, also known as Damex UDEA Algeciras by sponsorship reasons, is a professional basketball team based in Algeciras, Andalusia, that currently plays in LEB Plata.

== History ==
After being dissolved in 1997, former player Javier Malla re-founded the club in 2017. He acted as coach in the first seasons of the club, in Liga EBA. On 17 May 2019, after only spending two seasons in the league, UDEA Algeciras achieved promotion to LEB Plata.

== Season by season ==
Season	Tier	Division	Pos.	W–L
2017–18	4	Liga EBA	6th	20–8
2018–19	4	Liga EBA	3rd	24–7
2019–20	3	LEB Plata	5th (Note: Season curtailed due to the COVID-19 pandemic.)	13–12

== Notable players ==
- (Gibraltar) Sam Buxton
- (Chad) Edmond Koyanouba
- (Spain) Miguel Ortega Amusco
