= CB Benicarló =

Maderas Sorlí Club Bàsquet Benicarló
- Leagues: LEB Plata
- Founded: 1969
- Arena: Poliesportiu Municipal
- Capacity: 2,000
- Location: Benicarló, Spain
- Team colors: Red and white
- President: Enrique Besalduch
- Head coach: Jordi Adell
- Website: cbbenicarlo.com
Home	Away

Club Baloncesto Benicarló, is a professional basketball team based in Benicarló, Valencian Community, that currently plays in LEB Plata.

== History ==
1969 is considered the year of foundation of the club as it was the year when Club Baloncesto OJE, the first team in the city, was registered. After playing since its foundation in the third division, the club promotes for the first time ever in 1987.

In 2018 the club is selected to cover a vacant place in Liga EBA. After a first season where the club qualified to the final stage and failed to promote to LEB Plata in the repechage match, Benicarló achieves a spot for playing in the league.

== Season by season ==
Season	Tier	Division	Pos.	W–L
2018–19	4	Liga EBA	2nd (Note: Achieved a vacant place in LEB Plata.)	15–11
2019–20	3	LEB Plata	22nd (Note: Season curtailed due to the COVID-19 pandemic.)	7–18

== Current roster ==
Note: Flags indicate national team eligibility at FIBA-sanctioned events. Players may hold other non-FIBA nationalities not displayed.

Mi Arquitecto CB Benicarló roster
Players
Coaches

Pos.	No.	Nat.	Name	Ht.	Age
SF	31	(Spain)	Bartolomé, Hugo	1.99 m (6 ft 6 in)	27 – 4 April 1998
PF	13	(Spain)	Campos, Jaime	1.97 m (6 ft 6 in)	27 – 18 September 1998
PG	7	(Spain)	Carrasco, Raimon	1.87 m (6 ft 2 in)	26 – 4 September 1999
SF	10	(Italy)	Cavallero, Tomás	1.98 m (6 ft 6 in)	27 – 24 May 1998
SF	0	(Spain)	Clement, Kennedy	1.98 m (6 ft 6 in)	23 – 28 August 2002
C	3	(Serbia)	Đorđević, Nemanja	2.03 m (6 ft 8 in)	30 – 10 May 1995
PF		(Haiti)	Felizor, Kessly	2.01 m (6 ft 7 in)	28 – 27 February 1997
PG	6	(Spain)	Marín, Pablo	1.90 m (6 ft 3 in)	23 – 20 January 2002
C	11	(United States)	McCarty, Noah	2.04 m (6 ft 8 in)	27 – 21 January 1998
C	15	(Spain)	Nicolau, Javier	2.08 m (6 ft 10 in)	28 – 21 January 1997

Head coach

- (Spain) Adrià Alonso

Legend

- (C) Team captain
- Injured

== Notable players ==
Note: Flags indicate national team eligibility at FIBA-sanctioned events. Players may hold other non-FIBA nationalities not displayed.

Criteria

To appear in this section a player must have either:

- Set a club record or won an individual award while at the club
- Played at least one official international match for their national team at any time
- Played at least one official NBA match at any time.

- (Cape Verde) Keven Gomes
- (Finland) Fiifi Aidoo
