= ADB Pas =

Pas Piélagos
- Nickname: Pas
- Leagues: Liga EBA
- Founded: 1979; 46 years ago
- Arena: Polideportivo Fernando Expósito
- Location: Castañeda (1979–91); Renedo de Piélagos (1991–present)
- Team colors: Green, blue and white
- President: Luis García
- Head coach: Chus Sáinz
- Website: adbpas.com
Home	Away

Agrupación de Baloncesto Pas, also known as Pas Piélagos, is a basketball team based in Renedo de Piélagos, Cantabria, Spain, who currently plays in Liga EBA.

== History ==
AB Pas was founded in 1979 in Castañeda, Cantabria. In the 1983–84 season, Pas becomes runner-up of 1ª Autonómica League and promotes to the lowest national leagues.

In 1991, the team goes to Renedo de Piélagos, where nowadays continue playing. The team promotes to 2ª División, 1ª División and Liga EBA on 2004 after being champions of the Cantabrian group of 1ª División.

In 2008, Pas Piélagos plays the promotion playoffs to LEB Bronce, but could not win any game in the final stage.

== Season by season ==
Season	Tier	Division	Pos.	W–L
2002–03	5	1ª División	2nd	
2003–04	5	1ª División	1st	
2004–05	4	Liga EBA	10th	13–17
2005–06	4	Liga EBA	2nd	22–10
2006–07	4	Liga EBA	6th	14–12
2007–08	5	Liga EBA	3rd	20–13
2008–09	5	Liga EBA	13th	11–17
2009–10	4	Liga EBA	14th	9–17
2010–11	4	Liga EBA	16th	10–14
2011–12	4	Liga EBA	11th	13–11
2012–13	4	Liga EBA	21st	7–15
2013–14	4	Liga EBA	8th	13–9
2014–15	4	Liga EBA	12th (Note: Remained in the league after achieving a vacant berth.)	9–17
2015–16	4	Liga EBA	4th	17–9
2016–17	4	Liga EBA	7th	14–12
2017–18	4	Liga EBA	6th	17–13
2018–19	4	Liga EBA	3rd	21–5
2019–20	4	Liga EBA	4th	15–6
