= 2011–12 Liga EBA season =

18th season of the Liga EBA

The 2011–2012 Liga EBA season is the 18th edition of the Liga EBA. This is the fourth division of Spanish basketball. Four teams will be promoted to LEB Plata. The regular season (and all games before the final playoffs) will start on September 18, 2011, and will finish on April 28, 2012.

== Format ==
=== Regular season ===
Teams are divided in five groups by geographical criteria. Group A is also divided in two:

- Sub-group A-A: Cantabria, Basque Country, La Rioja and Castile and León (except teams from Zamora).
- Sub-group A-B: Galicia, Asturias and Zamora.
- Group B: Community of Madrid, Castile-La Mancha and Canary Islands.
- Group C: Catalonia and Aragón.
- Group D: Andalusia, Extremadura and Melilla.
- Group E: Valencian Community, Region of Murcia and Balearic Islands.

=== Final play-off ===
The three best teams of each group plus a fourth qualified decided with special criteria will play a double leg play-off. From these 16 teams, only four will be promoted to LEB Plata.

The first round games will be played on May 13 and 20, 2012; the second and last round on May 27 and June 3, 2012.

== Regular season tables ==
Key to colors
| Qualify to the Final Stage Playoffs |
| Qualify to the Second Round Playoffs |
| Relegate to Primera División |

=== Group A ===
==== Sub group A-A ====
| # | Teams | P | W | L | PF | PA | PT |
|---|---|---|---|---|---|---|---|
| 1 | Cafés Aitona | 22 | 18 | 4 | 1792 | 1547 | 40 |
| 2 | CD Estela | 22 | 16 | 6 | 1863 | 1637 | 38 |
| 3 | SAB Torrelavega | 22 | 13 | 9 | 1614 | 1599 | 35 |
| 4 | Universidad de Valladolid | 22 | 13 | 9 | 1859 | 1704 | 35 |
| 5 | Zornotza Saskibaloi Taldea | 22 | 11 | 11 | 1640 | 1698 | 33 |
| 6 | Pas Piélagos | 22 | 11 | 11 | 1730 | 1719 | 33 |
| 7 | UPV Álava | 22 | 10 | 12 | 1548 | 1572 | 32 |
| 8 | Easo Pastas Arruabarrena | 22 | 10 | 12 | 1502 | 1542 | 32 |
| 9 | Deportes Ferrer Santa María | 22 | 9 | 13 | 1453 | 1597 | 31 |
| 10 | Miguel Antonio Robleda | 22 | 9 | 13 | 1576 | 1667 | 31 |
| 11 | Merkamueble Torrelavega | 22 | 7 | 15 | 1630 | 1780 | 29 |
| 12 | Natra Oñati | 22 | 5 | 17 | 1694 | 1839 | 27 |

==== Sub group A-B ====
| # | Teams | P | W | L | PF | PA | PT |
|---|---|---|---|---|---|---|---|
| 1 | Establecimientos Otero | 20 | 18 | 2 | 1607 | 1236 | 38 |
| 2 | Marín Peixegalego | 20 | 15 | 5 | 1545 | 1313 | 35 |
| 3 | Recinor Ferrol CB | 20 | 14 | 6 | 1469 | 1336 | 34 |
| 4 | CB Chantada Galicia Vento | 20 | 11 | 9 | 1346 | 1329 | 31 |
| 5 | Grupo INEC-Queso Zamorano | 20 | 11 | 9 | 1437 | 1451 | 31 |
| 6 | Universidad de Oviedo | 20 | 10 | 10 | 1444 | 1416 | 30 |
| 7 | Baloncesto Narón | 20 | 8 | 12 | 1350 | 1474 | 28 |
| 8 | Ourense Capital Termal | 20 | 8 | 12 | 1281 | 1375 | 28 |
| 9 | Estudiantes Lugo Leyma Natura | 20 | 8 | 12 | 1366 | 1411 | 28 |
| 10 | Fidalgo Vecino | 20 | 5 | 15 | 1299 | 1426 | 25 |
| 11 | CI Rosalía de Castro | 20 | 2 | 18 | 1158 | 1535 | 22 |

=== Second round playoffs ===
The three first qualified teams of each group played against each other a two-legged tie. The winners of the games join the Final Stage playoffs. Team #1 played the second game at home.

| Team #1 | Agg. | Team #2 | 1st leg | 2nd leg |
|---|---|---|---|---|
| Cafés Aitona | 151–141 | Recinor Ferrol CB | 67–63 | 84–78 |
| Marín Peixegalego | 140–149 | CD Estela | 70–65 | 70–84 |
| Establecimientos Otero | 155–133 | SAB Torrelavega | 74–73 | 81–60 |

=== Group A final standings ===
After the regular season of the groups A-A and A-B, the team qualified in the same position play a double game play-off to determine their final position in the table.

| Pos | Team |
|---|---|
| 1 | Establecimientos Otero |
| 2 | Cafés Aitona |
| 3 | CD Estela |
| 4 | Marín Peixegalego |
| 5 | Recinor Ferrol CB |
| 6 | SAB Torrelavega |

| Pos | Team |
|---|---|
| 7 | Universidad de Valladolid |
| 8 | CB Chantada Galicia Vento |
| 9 | Zornotza Saskibaloi Taldea |
| 10 | Grupo INEC-Queso Zamorano |
| 11 | Pas Piélagos |
| 12 | Universidad de Oviedo |

| Pos | Team |
|---|---|
| 13 | Baloncesto Narón |
| 14 | UPV Álava |
| 15 | Easo Pastas Arruabarrena |
| 16 | Ourense Capital Termal |
| 17 | Estudiantes Lugo Leyma Natura |
| 18 | Deportes Ferrer Santa María |

| Pos | Team |
|---|---|
| 19 | Miguel Antonio Robleda |
| 20 | Fidalgo Vecino |
| 21 | CI Rosalía de Castro |
| 22 | Merkamueble Torrelavega |
| 23 | Natra Oñati |

=== Group B ===
| # | Teams | P | W | L | PF | PA | PT |
|---|---|---|---|---|---|---|---|
| 1 | Real Canoe NC | 30 | 26 | 4 | 2263 | 1933 | 56 |
| 2 | Euroconsult Alcobendas | 30 | 25 | 5 | 2453 | 2173 | 55 |
| 3 | CC Meridiano Santa Cruz | 30 | 25 | 5 | 2442 | 2122 | 55 |
| 4 | Real Madrid B | 30 | 24 | 6 | 2329 | 2039 | 54 |
| 5 | Torrejón Conteplast Medioambiente | 30 | 19 | 11 | 2318 | 2222 | 49 |
| 6 | Eurocolegio Casvi | 30 | 17 | 13 | 2212 | 2069 | 47 |
| 7 | Reale Baloncesto Ciudad Real | 30 | 17 | 13 | 2390 | 2305 | 47 |
| 8 | Espacio Torrelodones | 30 | 16 | 14 | 2311 | 2225 | 46 |
| 9 | Santa Cruz de La Palma | 30 | 14 | 16 | 2243 | 2339 | 44 |
| 10 | RC Náutico de Tenerife | 30 | 12 | 18 | 2282 | 2422 | 42 |
| 11 | Basket Globalcaja Quintanar | 30 | 11 | 19 | 2271 | 2419 | 41 |
| 12 | Alza Basket Azuqueca | 30 | 11 | 19 | 2192 | 2251 | 41 |
| 13 | CB Aridane | 30 | 9 | 21 | 2164 | 2356 | 39 |
| 14 | Asefa Estudiantes B | 30 | 8 | 22 | 2112 | 2246 | 38 |
| 15 | San Agustín del Guadalix | 30 | 3 | 27 | 1980 | 2388 | 33 |
| 16 | Fuenlabrada B-Illescas | 30 | 3 | 27 | 1987 | 2440 | 33 |

=== Group C ===
| # | Teams | P | W | L | PF | PA | PT |
|---|---|---|---|---|---|---|---|
| 1 | Eninter CB Santfeliuenc | 28 | 21 | 7 | 2215 | 2012 | 49 |
| 2 | Girona FC B | 28 | 18 | 10 | 2126 | 2006 | 46 |
| 3 | Sabadell Sant Nicolau | 28 | 17 | 11 | 1903 | 1826 | 45 |
| 4 | CB L'Hospitalet | 28 | 17 | 11 | 2080 | 2005 | 45 |
| 5 | Valentine Montcada | 28 | 17 | 11 | 2162 | 2095 | 45 |
| 6 | Sedis La Seu d'Urgell | 28 | 17 | 11 | 2307 | 2208 | 45 |
| 7 | Stadium Casablanca | 28 | 16 | 12 | 2129 | 2174 | 44 |
| 8 | AEC Collblanc Torrassa | 28 | 15 | 13 | 2221 | 2184 | 43 |
| 9 | Recambios Gaudí CB Mollet | 28 | 13 | 15 | 2279 | 2285 | 41 |
| 10 | Sabadell Bàsquet | 28 | 13 | 15 | 1961 | 1963 | 41 |
| 11 | Bàsquet Sitges | 28 | 13 | 15 | 1949 | 2022 | 41 |
| 12 | CB Cornellà | 28 | 12 | 16 | 1922 | 1967 | 40 |
| 13 | Monte Ducay Olivar | 28 | 9 | 19 | 1926 | 2045 | 37 |
| 14 | Queso Milner Arenys Bàsquet | 28 | 6 | 22 | 1916 | 2074 | 34 |
| 15 | CB Granollers | 28 | 6 | 22 | 1888 | 2118 | 34 |

=== Group D ===
| # | Teams | P | W | L | PF | PA | PT |
|---|---|---|---|---|---|---|---|
| 1 | Cajasol Banca Cívica B | 16 | 11 | 5 | 1217 | 1157 | 27 |
| 2 | CB Cimbis | 16 | 11 | 5 | 1232 | 1165 | 27 |
| 3 | ABP Badajoz | 16 | 10 | 6 | 1295 | 1149 | 26 |
| 4 | CAM Enrique Soler | 16 | 10 | 6 | 1327 | 1257 | 26 |
| 5 | Etiquetas Macho Morón | 16 | 10 | 6 | 1310 | 1240 | 26 |
| 6 | Baloncesto Córdoba | 16 | 9 | 7 | 1071 | 1132 | 25 |
| 7 | Montajes Rueda Andújar | 16 | 7 | 9 | 1116 | 1167 | 23 |
| 8 | Baños de Montemayor Villa Termal | 16 | 3 | 13 | 1080 | 1194 | 19 |
| 9 | CB Novaschool | 16 | 1 | 15 | 1038 | 1225 | 17 |

=== Group E ===
| # | Teams | P | W | L | PF | PA | PT |
|---|---|---|---|---|---|---|---|
| 1 | Platja de Palma | 22 | 17 | 5 | 2017 | 1767 | 39 |
| 2 | AB Castelló | 22 | 17 | 5 | 1858 | 1657 | 39 |
| 3 | Festival de Cine L'Alfàs | 22 | 15 | 7 | 1818 | 1653 | 37 |
| 4 | Opentach Bàsquet Pla | 22 | 13 | 9 | 1800 | 1748 | 35 |
| 5 | CE Bàsquet Llíria | 22 | 13 | 9 | 1685 | 1657 | 35 |
| 6 | CB UCAM Begastri | 22 | 13 | 9 | 1777 | 1676 | 35 |
| 7 | Aguas de Calpe | 22 | 11 | 11 | 1712 | 1699 | 33 |
| 8 | CB Alginet | 22 | 10 | 12 | 1581 | 1591 | 32 |
| 9 | Valencia BC B | 22 | 8 | 14 | 1624 | 1732 | 30 |
| 10 | Aquidos Arquitects Burriana | 22 | 5 | 17 | 1708 | 1804 | 27 |
| 11 | Space Eivissa Bàsquet | 22 | 5 | 17 | 1633 | 1958 | 27 |
| 12 | Universitat Politècnica de València | 22 | 5 | 17 | 1669 | 1940 | 27 |

== Final playoffs ==
16 teams will join the Final play-offs. Four of them will promote to LEB Plata.

Semifinals; 12, 19 May
3D | ABP Badajoz | 84 | 58 | 142
1E | Platja de Palma | 83 | 68 | 151
3B | CC Meridiano Santa Cruz | 91 | 70 | 161
2C | Girona FC B | 55 | 75 | 130

Finals; 26 May, 2 June
1E | Platja de Palma | 84 | 94 | 178
3B | CC Meridiano Santa Cruz | 78 | 84 | 162

Semifinals
2E | AB Castelló | 82 | 83 | 165
2D | CB Cimbis | 81 | 89 | 170
3A | CD Estela | 74 | 65 | 139
1C | Eninter CB Santfeliuenc | 62 | 84 | 146

Finals
2D | CB Cimbis | 66 | 68 | 134
1C | Eninter CB Santfeliuenc | 69 | 85 | 154

Semifinals
3E | Festival de Cine L'Alfàs | 60 | 56 | 116
1B | Real Canoe NC | 68 | 84 | 152
2A | Cafés Aitona
*D | Withdrew

Finals
1B | Real Canoe NC | 54 | 65 | 119
2A | Cafés Aitona | 72 | 56 | 128

Semifinals
4E | Opentach Bàsquet Pla | 63 | 56 | 119
1A | Establecimientos Otero | 73 | 85 | 158
3C | Sabadell Sant Nicolau | 76 | 63 | 139
2B | Euroconsult Alcobendas | 55 | 80 | 135

Finals
1A | Establecimientos Otero | 66 | 64 | 130
3C | Sabadell Sant Nicolau | 71 | 64 | 135

=== Playoffs table ===
| Pos | Team |
|---|---|
| 1 | Cafés Aitona |
| 2 | Platja de Palma |
| 3 | CB Santfeliuenc |
| 4 | Sabadell Sant Nicolau |
| 5 | Establecimientos Otero |

| Pos | Team |
|---|---|
| 6 | Real Canoe NC |
| 7 | CB Cimbis |
| 8 | CC Meridiano Santa Cruz |
| 9 | Euroconsult Alcobendas |
| 10 | AB Castelló |

| Pos | Team |
|---|---|
| 11 | CD Estela |
| 12 | Girona FC B |
| 13 | Festival de Cine L'Alfàs |
| 14 | ABP Badajoz |
| 15 | Opentach Bàsquet Pla |

== References and notes ==
- Competition rules (in Spanish)
- Promotion and relegation rules to 1ª División (in Spanish)
