= AB Pacense =

ABP
- Leagues: Liga EBA
- Founded: 2005
- Dissolved: 2013
- Arena: Polideportivo La Granadilla (Capacity: 5,500)
- Location: Badajoz, Spain
- Team colors: Blue and white
- President: Martín Ávalos
- Head coach: Fernando Méndez
- Website: www.baloncestoabp.com
| Home | Away |

Asociación de Baloncesto Pacense, also known as ABP, is a basketball team based in Badajoz, Extremadura, Spain, which currently plays in Liga EBA, which is classified as the fourth tier of Spanish basketball.

== History of Pacense Basketball ==
ABP continues the tradition of professional basketball in Badajoz, following predecessors such as Caja Badajoz, Círculo de Badajoz (also known as Badajoz Caja Rural and Cosmópolis), and Habitacle Badajoz. Notably, Círculo de Badajoz nearly achieved promotion to the ACB League. During the 1998/1999 season in the LEB League, the team finished fifth and reached the final round of the playoff for promotion to the ACB League. The roster included notable players such as Spanish internationals Jaume Comas and Carlos Cabezas.

=== Creation ===
AB Pacense was founded in 2005 as a response to the challenges faced by a group of young people in Badajoz who had to travel outside the city to participate in senior level basketball games. The aim was to substitute dissolved basketball teams of Badajoz like CajaBadajoz, Círculo Badajoz (former LEB Oro team) or Habitacle. The team started playing on 1ª División (Spanish fifth division).

The club fielded teams in the EBA League, 1st National, and Diputación divisions. Additionally, it supported numerous players in junior categories who were considered potential future contributors to the club. Since its inception, the club achieved notable results across all mentioned categories.

The management of the club consisted of young, non-profit directors who aimed to enhance the existing basketball infrastructure. These directors, who were trained as basketball players during their youth, sought to improve the structuring of areas and the utilization of human resources to benefit future generations of players.

In 2008 promoted to Liga EBA, division where it continues playing nowadays. In 2011 the team plays the promotion playoffs to LEB Plata but after eliminating the farm team of Real Madrid, is defeated by CB Santfeliuenc in a disastrous second leg game.

In summer 2011 the club tried to achieve a vacant berth of LEB Plata, but finally continues playing in Liga EBA.

Finally, the club was dissolved in summer 2013.

== Season by season ==
| Season | Tier | Division | Pos. | W–L |
|---|---|---|---|---|
| 2005–06 | 5 | 1ª División | 6th | 7–9 |
| 2006–07 | 5 | 1ª División | 9th | 6–14 |
| 2007–08 | 6 | 1ª División | 1st | 14–5 |
| 2008–09 | 5 | Liga EBA | 9th | 8–16 |
| 2009–10 | 4 | Liga EBA | 9th | 14–16 |
| 2010–11 | 4 | Liga EBA | 1st | 23–3 |
| 2011–12 | 4 | Liga EBA | 3rd | 11–7 |
| 2012–13 | 4 | Liga EBA | 7th | 5–9 |
