= Real Grupo de Cultura Covadonga (basketball) =

Spanish basketball team

- Leagues: Liga EBA
- Arena: Pabellón Braulio García
- Capacity: Capacity: 1,331
- Location: Gijón, Asturias, Spain
- Team colors: Red, navy
- President: Enrique Tamargo
- Head coach: Emilio Pérez
Home	Away

Real Grupo de Cultura Covadonga is a Spanish basketball team based in Gijón, Asturias. It currently plays in Liga EBA.

== History ==
In its first years, the club was quarterfinalist of the Copa del Rey (1949, 1950 and 1951). During the 1960s and the 1970s the team played in tiers 2 and 3, until 1982 when due to financial problems it sold its spot to recently founded Gijón Baloncesto.

It came back to the national divisions in 1997, when it promoted to Liga EBA. Nowadays, Grupo Covadonga alternates seasons between this league and Primera División de Baloncesto.

== Season by season ==
Season	Tier	Division	Pos.	W–L
1968–69	2	2ª División	4th	7–8
1969–70	2	2ª División	10th	4–16
1970–71	3	3ª División	7th	9–11
1971–72	3	3ª División	10th	9–1–14
1972–73	3	3ª División	7th	8–2–12
1973–74	3	3ª División		
1974–75	3	3ª División	9th	7–1–12
1975–76	3	3ª División	4th	15–1–8
1976–77	3	3ª División	2nd	16–1–7
1977–78	3	3ª División	4th	15–2–9
1978–79	3	2ª División	1st	18–1–3
1979–80	2	1ª División B	9th	13–17
1980–81	2	1ª División B	14th	6–20
1981–82	3	2ª División	(Note: Sold its berth in the league to the newly created Gijón Baloncesto.)	
1982–83	4	3ª División		
1983–84	3	2ª División		
1984–96	Lower divisions			
1996–97	3	Liga EBA	9th	10–16
1997–98	3	Liga EBA	13th	5–21
1998–99	3	Liga EBA	11th	11–17
1999–00	3	Liga EBA	13th (Note: Remained in the league due to the existence of vacant berths.)	7–19
2000–01	4	Liga EBA	11th	13–17
2001–02	4	Liga EBA	18th	4–30
2002–03	5	1ª División	1st	14–10
2003–04	5	1ª División	1st	19–3
2004–05	5	1ª División	1st	22–1
2005–06	5	1ª División	2nd	16–6
2006–07	5	1ª División	1st (Note: Achieved a vacant berth in Liga EBA.)	22–3
2007–08	5	Liga EBA	10th	12–18
2008–09	5	Liga EBA	12th (Note: Resigned to its berth in Liga EBA.)	11–17
2009–10	5	1ª División	2nd	22–2
2010–11	5	1ª División	1st	20–5
2011–12	5	1ª División	2nd	15–9
2012–13	5	1ª División	2nd	16–6
2013–14	5	1ª División	2nd	16–4
2014–15	5	1ª División	1st	19–4
2015–16	4	Liga EBA	12th	5–17
2016–17	5	1ª División	2nd	19–3
2017–18	5	1ª División	1st (Note: Resigned to promete to Liga EBA.)	18–6
2018–19	5	1ª División	1st	21–3
