= CD Estela =

Grupo Alega Cantabria CBT
- Leagues: Primera FEB
- Founded: 1999
- Arena: Pabellón Vicente Trueba
- Capacity: 2,500
- Location: Torrelavega, Cantabria, Spain
- Team colors: Red and white
- President: Jorge Ulises Corona
- Head coach: Lolo Encinas
- Website: cdestela.com
Home	Away

Club Deportivo Estela is a Spanish professional basketball team based in Torrelavega, Cantabria, Spain. The club currently competes in the Primera FEB, the second division of pro basketball in Spain.

== History ==
Estela was founded in 1999 in Santander. In June 2011, the team tried to be promoted into one of the vacant berths in LEB Plata, but the club continues playing at Liga EBA due to a lack of funds.

However, after several years being so close to promote to LEB Plata, the club achieved a vacant berth after the expansion of the league from 16 to 24 teams.

In March 2020, the club announced the relocation from Santander to Torrelavega.

== Current roster ==
Note: Flags indicate national team eligibility at FIBA-sanctioned events. Players may hold other non-FIBA nationalities not displayed.

CD Estela roster
Players
Coaches

Pos.	No.	Nat.	Name	Ht.	Age
SG	0	(United States)	Jenkins, Kyler	1.88 m (6 ft 2 in)	26 – 15 July 2000
PG	2	(United States) (Jamaica)	Wintering, Alec	1.80 m (5 ft 11 in)	31 – 26 April 1995
PF	5	(United States) (Finland)	Murphy, Alex	2.06 m (6 ft 9 in)	33 – 3 June 1993
PG	7	(Spain)	Martínez, Germán	1.89 m (6 ft 2 in)	28 – 29 June 1998
PF	8	(Spain)	Rodríguez, Samuel	2.02 m (6 ft 8 in)	29 – 17 August 1997
PG	9	(Spain)	Ferrando, Guillem	1.86 m (6 ft 1 in)	24 – 8 January 2002
SF	11	(Spain)	Seoane, Rodrigo	2.04 m (6 ft 8 in)	27 – 16 August 1999
SF	12	(Spain)	Alderete, Diego	1.94 m (6 ft 4 in)	26 – 22 April 2000
PF	21	(Serbia)	Ostojić, Danilo	2.05 m (6 ft 9 in)	30 – 11 May 1996
C	22	(Spain)	Menéndez, Javier	2.01 m (6 ft 7 in)	29 – 5 August 1997
C	24	(Nigeria)	Nwogbo, Lotanna	2.03 m (6 ft 8 in)	33 – 30 May 1993
SG	31	(Slovenia)	Lapornik, Miha	1.92 m (6 ft 4 in)	33 – 18 October 1993

Head coach

- (Spain) Lolo Encinas

Legend

- (C) Team captain
- Injured

== Season by season ==
Season	Tier	Division	Pos.	W–L	Cup competitions	
2002–03	6	1ª Autonómica	5th			
2003–04	5	1ª División	4th			
2004–05	5	1ª División	2nd			
2005–06	5	1ª División	2nd	12–8		
2006–07	5	1ª División	3rd			
2007–08	6	1ª División	2nd			
2008–09	5	Liga EBA	7th	15–13		
2009–10	4	Liga EBA	8th	14–12		
2010–11	4	Liga EBA	3rd	15–11		
2011–12	4	Liga EBA	3rd	19–7		
2012–13	4	Liga EBA	19th	9–13		
2013–14	4	Liga EBA	12th	10–12		
2014–15	4	Liga EBA	4th	17–9		
2015–16	4	Liga EBA	3rd	19–7		
2016–17	4	Liga EBA	1st	26–4		
2017–18	4	Liga EBA	1st (Note: Achieved one of the places after the expansion of the LEB Plata.)	29–5		
2018–19	3	LEB Plata	11th	15–19		
2019–20	3	LEB Plata	6th (Note: Season curtailed due to the COVID-19 pandemic.)	13–12		
2020–21	3	LEB Plata	4th	21–11		
2021–22	3	LEB Plata	1st	21–7		
2022–23	2	LEB Oro	11th	15–19		
2023–24	2	LEB Oro	14th	11–23		
2024–25	2	Primera FEB	12th	13–21	Spain Cup	GS
2025–26	2	Primera FEB	11th	12–20	Spain Cup	R32

== Notable players ==
Note: Flags indicate national team eligibility at FIBA-sanctioned events. Players may hold other non-FIBA nationalities not displayed.

Criteria

To appear in this section a player must have either:

- Set a club record or won an individual award while at the club
- Played at least one official international match for their national team at any time
- Played at least one official NBA match at any time.

- (Ivory Coast) Moussa Kone
- (Portugal) Rafael Lisboa
