= 2016–17 Liga EBA season =

23rd season of the Liga EBA

Liga EBA
- Season: 2016–17

The 2016–17 Liga EBA season was the 23rd edition of the Liga EBA. This is the fourth division of Spanish basketball. Four teams will be promoted to LEB Plata. The regular season started in September 2016 and will ended in March 2017. The Final Stage to LEB Plata was played in April 2017.

== Format ==
=== Regular season ===
Teams are divided in five groups by geographical criteria. Groups A, C and D are divided in two.

- Group A–A: Asturias, Galicia and Castile and León
- Group A–B: Basque Country, Cantabria, Castile and León and Navarre
- Group B: Community of Madrid, Castile-La Mancha and Canary Islands.
- Groups C–A: Aragon, Catalonia and Balearic Islands.
- Groups C–B: Catalonia and Balearic Islands.
- Group D–A: Andalusia and Melilla.
- Group D–B: Andalusia and Extremadura.
- Group E: Valencian Community and Region of Murcia.

=== Final stage ===
The three best teams of each group and the fourth of Group D (champion of the previous season) will play the Final Stage. From these 16 teams, only four will be promoted to LEB Plata. The winner of each group can organize a group stage.

The Final Stage will be played round-robin format in groups of four teams where the first qualified of each group will host one of the stages.

== Regular season ==
=== Group A ===
==== Group A–A ====
Pos	Team	Pld	W	L	PF	PA	PD	Pts	Qualification or relegation
1	Igualitorio Cantabria Estela	26	23	3	2108	1591	+517	49	Qualification to the Final Stage
2	Gallofa & Co.	26	20	6	2010	1802	+208	46	Qualification to the qualifying playoff
3	CB Santurtzi SK	26	19	7	1791	1517	+274	45	Qualification to the qualifying playoff
4	Easo Loquillo	26	19	7	1915	1599	+316	45	
5	Megacalzado Ardoi	26	17	9	1846	1758	+88	43	
6	Universidad de Valladolid	26	15	11	1918	1872	+46	41	
7	Pas Piélagos	26	14	12	2018	2042	−24	40	
8	Grupo de Santiago Automoción	26	12	14	1747	1775	−28	38	
9	CB Valle de Egüés	26	11	15	1731	1817	−86	37	
10	Universidad de Burgos	26	8	18	1734	1988	−254	34	
11	Mondragón Unibersitatea	26	8	18	1749	1937	−188	34	Relegation to Primera División
12	Redline Mekanika TAKE	26	8	18	1504	1803	−299	34	Relegation to Primera División
13	Ulacia Grupo	26	6	20	1723	1897	−174	32	Relegation to Primera División
14	Baloncesto Venta de Baños	26	2	24	1875	2271	−396	28	Relegation to Primera División

Source: Liga EBA

==== Group A–B ====
Pos	Team	Pld	W	L	PF	PA	PD	Pts	Qualification or relegation
1	CB Chantada	26	22	4	1870	1525	+345	48	Qualification to the Final Stage
2	Calidus Gallego COB	26	18	8	1883	1768	+115	44	Qualification to the qualifying playoff
3	ULE Fundación Baloncesto León	26	18	8	2112	1896	+216	44	Qualification to the qualifying playoff
4	Estudiantes Lugo Leyma Natura	26	17	9	1964	1768	+196	43	
5	Pozo Sotón BVM2012	26	16	10	1988	1833	+155	42	
6	Residencia Las Encinas CDP	26	15	11	2102	1934	+168	41	
7	Santo Domingo Betanzos	26	14	12	1923	1877	+46	40	
8	Instituto Rosalía de Castro	26	13	13	1890	1919	−29	39	
9	Baloncesto Narón	26	13	13	1949	1998	−49	39	
10	Innova Chef	26	10	16	1784	1892	−108	36	
11	CB La Flecha	26	10	16	1907	1938	−31	36	
12	Gijón Basket	26	9	17	1837	1950	−113	35	Relegation to Primera División
13	VGO Basket	26	7	19	1788	1979	−191	33	Relegation to Primera División
14	Syngenta Seis do Nadal	26	0	26	1469	2189	−720	26	Relegation to Primera División

Source: Liga EBA

==== Finals ====
===== First-qualified teams playoff =====
The winner of this single-legged series hosted one of the four groups of the final stage. The game was played at the Palacio de Deportes of Santander.

Team 1	Score	Team 2
Igualatorio Cantabria Estela	79–75	CB Chantada

===== Qualifying playoffs =====
The winner would qualify for the final stage. The games were played the Palacio de Deportes of Santander.

Semifinals
Gallofa & Co.	71
ULE Fundación Baloncesto León	75
Calidus Gallego COB	91
CB Santurtzi SK	87

Final
ULE Fundación Baloncesto León	78
Calidus Gallego COB	76

=== Group B ===
Pos	Team	Pld	W	L	PF	PA	PD	Pts	Qualification or relegation
1	Eurocolegio Casvi	30	23	7	2441	2175	+266	53	Qualification to the Final Stage
2	Real Canoe NC	30	23	7	2339	1918	+421	53	Qualification to the Final Stage
3	Real Madrid B (Note: Real Madrid B resigned to play the final stage as it is played during the same dates as the final of the Next Generation Tournament.)	30	23	7	2231	1955	+276	53	
4	Fundación Globalcaja La Roda	30	22	8	2315	2155	+160	52	Qualification to the Final Stage
5	Isover Basket Azuqueca	30	21	9	2386	2220	+166	51	
6	Náutico KIA Tenerife	30	20	10	2419	2149	+270	50	
7	Agrícola CB Villarrobledo	30	16	14	2137	2086	+51	46	
8	NCS Alcobendas	30	15	15	2120	2187	−67	45	
9	Lujisa Guadalajara Basket	30	15	15	2139	2168	−29	45	
10	Gran Canaria B	30	15	15	2061	2097	−36	45	
11	Globalcaja Quintanar	30	13	17	2103	2129	−26	43	
12	Aloe Plus Lanzarote Conejeros	30	10	20	2243	2442	−199	40	
13	Movistar Estudiantes B	30	9	21	1959	2282	−323	39	Relegation to Primera División
14	Uros de Rivas ATICON	30	6	24	2091	2387	−296	36	Relegation to Primera División
15	HM Torrelodones	30	6	24	1997	2337	−340	36	Relegation to Primera División
16	Viten Fuenlabrada (Note: Viten Fuenlabrada was deducted 1 point.)	30	3	27	1906	2200	−294	32	Relegation to Primera División

Source: Liga EBA

=== Group C ===
==== Group C–A ====
Pos	Team	Pld	W	L	PF	PA	PD	Pts	Qualification or relegation
1	BC Martorell Solvin	26	19	7	2136	1869	+267	45	Qualification to Final Four
2	Flanigan Calvià	26	17	9	2075	1949	+126	43	Qualification to Final Four
3	Made in Menorca	26	15	11	1900	1853	+47	41	
4	Multiópticas CB Salt	26	14	12	1781	1753	+28	40	
5	Aracena AEC Collblanc	26	13	13	1789	1852	−63	39	
6	Club Bàsquet Castellbisbal	26	13	13	2034	2033	+1	39	
7	CB Cornellà	26	13	13	1871	1857	+14	39	
8	Arenys Bàsquet Joventut Citroën Calella	26	13	13	1960	1926	+34	39	
9	Simply Olivar	26	12	14	1931	1953	−22	38	
10	JAC Sants	26	12	14	1772	1858	−86	38	
11	Sant Nicolau Sabadell	26	12	14	1900	1933	−33	38	
12	Outletmoto.com CB Grup Barna (R)	26	11	15	1855	1929	−74	37	Qualification to relegation playoffs
13	Mataró Feimat (O)	26	11	15	1848	1934	−86	37	Qualification to relegation playoffs
14	CB Santfeliuenc (R)	26	7	19	1892	2045	−153	33	Relegation to Primera División

Source: Liga EBA
(O) Play-off winners; (R) Relegated

==== Group C–B ====
Pos	Team	Pld	W	L	PF	PA	PD	Pts	Qualification or relegation
1	Recambios Gaudí CB Mollet	26	22	4	2122	1866	+256	48	Qualification to Final Four
2	CB Pardinyes Lleida	26	20	6	2072	1917	+155	46	Qualification to Final Four
3	CB Quart Germans Cruz	26	18	8	2136	1914	+222	44	
4	Barberà Team Values	26	16	10	1954	1933	+21	42	
5	Physic CB Igualada	26	13	13	1973	1929	+44	39	
6	UB Sant Adrià	26	13	13	2184	2104	+80	39	
7	Palma Air Europa B	26	13	13	1979	2027	−48	39	
8	AE Muro Basket Academy	26	12	14	2062	2051	+11	38	
9	BBA Castelldefels	26	11	15	1980	1984	−4	37	
10	CB Valls Nutrion	26	11	15	1876	2003	−127	37	
11	Vive El Masnou Basquetbol	26	11	15	1805	1803	+2	37	
12	Bàsquet Sitges (R)	26	8	18	1815	1977	−162	34	Qualification to relegation playoffs
13	MoraBanc Andorra B (O)	26	7	19	1870	2069	−199	33	Qualification to relegation playoffs
14	CB Cerdanyola Al Dia (R)	26	7	19	1874	2125	−251	33	Relegation to Primera División

Source: Liga EBA
(O) Play-off winners; (R) Relegated

==== Finals ====
===== Qualifying playoffs =====
The games was played at Santa Ponça.

Semifinals
BC Martorell Solvin	88
CB Pardinyes Lleida	84
Recambios Gaudí CB Mollet	74
Flanigan Calvià	83

Final
BC Martorell Solvin	80
Flanigan Calvià	77
Third place
CB Pardinyes Lleida	69
Recambios Gaudí CB Mollet	82

===== Relegation playoffs =====
Team 1	Agg.	Team 2	1st leg	2nd leg
Mataró Feimat	122–110	Bàsquet Sitges	66–65	56–45
MoraBanc Andorra B	149–126	Outletmoto.com CB Grup Barna	79–52	70–74

=== Group D ===
==== Regular season ====
===== Group D–A =====
Pos	Team	Pld	W	L	PF	PA	PD	Pts	Qualification
1	CAM Enrique Soler	14	9	5	1078	1020	+58	23	Qualification to second stage
2	Forus Medacbasket	14	8	6	1009	973	+36	22	Qualification to second stage
3	CB Andújar Jaén Paraíso Interior	14	8	6	1025	988	+37	22	Qualification to second stage
4	CB Cazorla Jaén Paraíso Interior	14	7	7	1135	1163	−28	21	Qualification to second stage
5	Meridiano Baza	14	7	7	979	979	0	21	Qualification to relegation group
6	Unicaja Rincón Fertilidad	14	6	8	963	1041	−78	20	Qualification to relegation group
7	CB Coín Almoguera Abogados	14	6	8	1003	1019	−16	20	Qualification to relegation group
8	CB Novaschool	14	5	9	1052	1061	−9	19	Qualification to relegation group

Source: Liga EBA

===== Group D–B =====
Pos	Team	Pld	W	L	PF	PA	PD	Pts	Qualification
1	Oh!Tels ULB	14	11	3	987	908	+79	25	Qualification to second stage
2	Huelva	14	10	4	979	916	+63	24	Qualification to second stage
3	Yosíquesé	14	10	4	1054	926	+128	24	Qualification to second stage
4	Telwi CB San Juan	14	7	7	1009	974	+35	21	Qualification to second stage
5	Alba Ibis CB Utrera	14	7	7	860	917	−57	21	Qualification to relegation group
6	Cintra Plasencia	14	6	8	925	924	+1	20	Qualification to relegation group
7	DKV San Fernando	14	4	10	976	1058	−82	18	Qualification to relegation group
8	Real Betis Energía Plus B	14	1	13	978	1145	−167	15	Qualification to relegation group

Source: Liga EBA

==== Second stage ====
===== Group D–Qualification =====
Pos	Team	Pld	W	L	PF	PA	PD	Pts	Qualification
1	CB Cazorla Jaén Paraíso Interior	14	12	2	1208	1074	+134	26	Qualification to the qualifying playoff
2	CAM Enrique Soler	14	10	4	1060	953	+107	24	Qualification to the qualifying playoff
3	Yosíquesé	14	7	7	1014	968	+46	21	Qualification to the qualifying playoff
4	Oh!Tels ULB	14	7	7	956	1035	−79	21	Qualification to the qualifying playoff
5	Huelva	14	6	8	938	1015	−77	20	
6	Forus Medacbasket	14	5	9	990	1043	−53	19	
7	CB Andújar Jaén Paraíso Interior	14	5	9	983	997	−14	19	
8	Telwi CB San Juan	14	4	10	1008	1072	−64	18	

Source: Liga EBA

===== Group D–Relegation =====
Pos	Team	Pld	W	L	PF	PA	PD	Pts	Relegation
1	Alba Ibis CB Utrera	14	9	5	939	935	+4	23	
2	Meridiano Baza	14	9	5	974	886	+88	23	
3	Cintra Plasencia	14	8	6	987	951	+36	22	
4	Unicaja Rincón Fertilidad	14	8	6	1009	1002	+7	22	
5	CB Novaschool	14	8	6	988	941	+47	22	
6	DKV San Fernando	14	8	6	1051	1035	+16	22	Relegation to Primera División
7	CB Coín Almoguera Abogados	14	4	10	1046	1131	−85	18	Relegation to Primera División
8	Real Betis Energía Plus B	14	2	12	994	1107	−113	16	Relegation to Primera División

Source: Liga EBA

==== Finals ====
Semifinals
Oh!Tels ULB	87	68	155
CB Cazorla Jaén Paraíso Interior	72	92	164
Yosíquesé	78	56	134
CAM Enrique Soler	76	70	146

Final
CB Cazorla Jaén Paraíso Interior	61	89	150
CAM Enrique Soler	81	62	143

Third place
Oh!Tels ULB	77	48	125
Yosíquesé	61	70	131

=== Group E ===
==== Regular season ====
Pos	Team	Pld	W	L	PF	PA	PD	Pts	Qualification
1	BeHappy2 CB Myrtia	18	16	2	1415	1116	+299	34	Qualification to group E–1
2	Valencia BC B	18	11	7	1382	1301	+81	29	Qualification to group E–1
3	UCAM Murcia B	18	11	7	1243	1191	+52	29	Qualification to group E–1
4	UPCT Basket Cartagena	18	10	8	1327	1341	−14	28	Qualification to group E–1
5	Grupo Sanz Bàsquet Llíria	18	9	9	1319	1352	−33	27	Qualification to group E–1
6	Servigroup Benidorm	18	8	10	1308	1334	−26	26	Qualification to group E–2
7	Power Electronics Paterna	18	8	10	1295	1317	−22	26	Qualification to group E–2
8	CB Puerto Sagunto	18	8	10	1220	1307	−87	26	Qualification to group E–2
9	L'Alfàs PN Serra Gelada	18	7	11	1226	1275	−49	25	Qualification to group E–2
10	CB Jovens Almàssera	18	2	16	1151	1352	−201	20	Qualification to group E–2

Source: Liga EBA

==== Second stage ====
===== Group E–Qualification =====
Pos	Team	Pld	W	L	PF	PA	PD	Pts	Qualification
1	BeHappy2 CB Myrtia	16	13	3	1204	1050	+154	29	Qualification to the Final Stage
2	UPCT Basket Cartagena	16	8	8	1231	1251	−20	24	Qualification to the Final Stage
3	Valencia BC B	16	8	8	1282	1272	+10	24	Qualification to the Final Stage
4	UCAM Murcia B	16	7	9	1158	1192	−34	23	
5	Grupo Sanz Bàsquet Llíria	16	4	12	1125	1235	−110	20	

Source: Liga EBA

===== Group E–Relegation =====
Pos	Team	Pld	W	L	PF	PA	PD	Pts	Relegation
1	L'Alfàs PN Serra Gelada	16	10	6	1157	1091	+66	26	
2	Servigroup Benidorm	16	10	6	1157	1132	+25	26	
3	Power Electronics Paterna	16	9	7	1102	1102	0	25	
4	CB Puerto Sagunto	16	8	8	1144	1129	+15	24	Relegation to Primera División
5	CB Jovens Almàssera	16	3	13	1101	1207	−106	19	Relegation to Primera División

Source: Liga EBA

== Promotion playoffs ==
The 16 qualified teams were divided in four groups of four teams. The first qualified teams hosted the groups, played with a round-robin format.

The winner of each group promoted to LEB Plata.

=== Group 1 – Cazorla ===
Pos	Grp	Team	Pld	W	L	PF	PA	PD	Pts	Promotion
1	B4	Fundación Globalcaja La Roda (P)	3	3	0	265	209	+56	6	Promotion to LEB Plata
2	D1	CB Cazorla Jaén Paraíso Interior (H)	3	2	1	270	251	+19	5	
3	C2	Flanigan Calvià	3	1	2	247	248	−1	4	
4	E2	UPCT Basket Cartagena	3	0	3	195	269	−74	3	

Source: FEB.es
(H) Hosts; (P) Promoted

19 May 2017

Boxscore

CB Cazorla Jaén Paraíso Interior	92–91	Flanigan Calvià

19 May 2017

Boxscore

UPCT Basket Cartagena	54–90	Fundación Globalcaja La Roda

20 May 2017

Boxscore

Fundación Globalcaja La Roda	88–77	Flanigan Calvià

20 May 2017

Boxscore

UPCT Basket Cartagena	73–100	CB Cazorla Jaén Paraíso Interior

21 May 2017

Boxscore

Flanigan Calvià	79–68	UPCT Basket Cartagena

21 May 2017

Boxscore

CB Cazorla Jaén Paraíso Interior	78–87	Fundación Globalcaja La Roda

=== Group 2 – Murcia ===
Pos	Grp	Team	Pld	W	L	PF	PA	PD	Pts	Promotion
1	E1	BeHappy2 CB Myrtia (H, P)	3	3	0	213	171	+42	6	Promotion to LEB Plata
2	A2	CB Chantada	3	1	2	186	191	−5	4	
3	C4	CB Pardinyes Lleida	3	1	2	193	216	−23	4	
4	D2	CAM Enrique Soler	3	1	2	200	214	−14	4	

Source: Feb.es
(H) Hosts; (P) Promoted

19 May 2017

Boxscore

CAM Enrique Soler	65–70	CB Pardinyes Lleida

19 May 2017

Boxscore

BeHappy2 CB Myrtia	57–47	CB Chantada

20 May 2017

Boxscore

CB Chantada	66–67	CAM Enrique Soler

20 May 2017

Boxscore

BeHappy2 CB Myrtia	78–56	CB Pardinyes Lleida

21 May 2017

Boxscore

CB Chantada	73–67	CB Pardinyes Lleida

21 May 2017

Boxscore

BeHappy2 CB Myrtia	78–68	CAM Enrique Soler

=== Group 3 – Santander ===
Pos	Grp	Team	Pld	W	L	PF	PA	PD	Pts	Promotion
1	B2	Real Canoe NC (P)	3	3	0	212	190	+22	6	Promotion to LEB Plata
2	A1	Igualatorio Cantabria Estela (H)	3	2	1	195	191	+4	5	
3	C3	Recambios Gaudí CB Mollet	3	1	2	193	199	−6	4	
4	E3	Valencia BC B	3	0	3	206	226	−20	3	

(H) Hosts; (P) Promoted

19 May 2017

Boxscore

Igualatorio Cantabria Estela	77–73	Valencia BC B

19 May 2017

Boxscore

Real Canoe NC	71–67	Recambios Gaudí CB Mollet

20 May 2017

Boxscore

Real Canoe NC	78–69	Valencia BC B

20 May 2017

Boxscore

Igualatorio Cantabria Estela	64–55	Recambios Gaudí CB Mollet

21 May 2017

Boxscore

Recambios Gaudí CB Mollet	71–64	Valencia BC B

21 May 2017

Boxscore

Igualatorio Cantabria Estela	54–63	Real Canoe NC

=== Group 4 – Villaviciosa de Odón ===
Pos	Grp	Team	Pld	W	L	PF	PA	PD	Pts	Promotion
1	C1	BC Martorell Solvin (P)	3	3	0	235	190	+45	6	Promotion to LEB Plata
2	B1	Eurocolegio Casvi (H)	3	2	1	235	220	+15	5	
3	D3	Yosíquesé	3	1	2	213	252	−39	4	
4	A3	ULE Fundación Baloncesto León	3	0	3	223	244	−21	3	

Source: FEB.es
(H) Hosts; (P) Promoted

19 May 2017

Boxscore

BC Martorell Solvin	77–64	ULE Fundación Baloncesto León

19 May 2017

Boxscore

Yosíquesé	71–84	Eurocolegio Casvi

20 May 2017

Boxscore

ULE Fundación Baloncesto León	80–83	Yosíquesé

20 May 2017

Boxscore

Eurocolegio Casvi	67–70	BC Martorell Solvin

21 May 2017

Boxscore

BC Martorell Solvin	88–59	Yosíquesé

21 May 2017

Boxscore

Eurocolegio Casvi	84–79	ULE Fundación Baloncesto León
