= Gijón Basket =

- League: EBA
- Founded: 2015
- Arena: Palacio de Deportes
- Capacity: 5,058
- Location: Gijón, Spain
- Team colors: White and red
- President: Iván Petrovich
- Head coach: Fran Sánchez
- Website: gijonbasket2015.com
Home	Away

Club Gijón Basket 2015 Corpi, better known as Gijón Basket or Huniko GB2015 for sponsorship reasons, is a basketball club based in Gijón, Asturias that currently plays in Liga EBA, the fourth tier of Spanish basketball.

== History ==
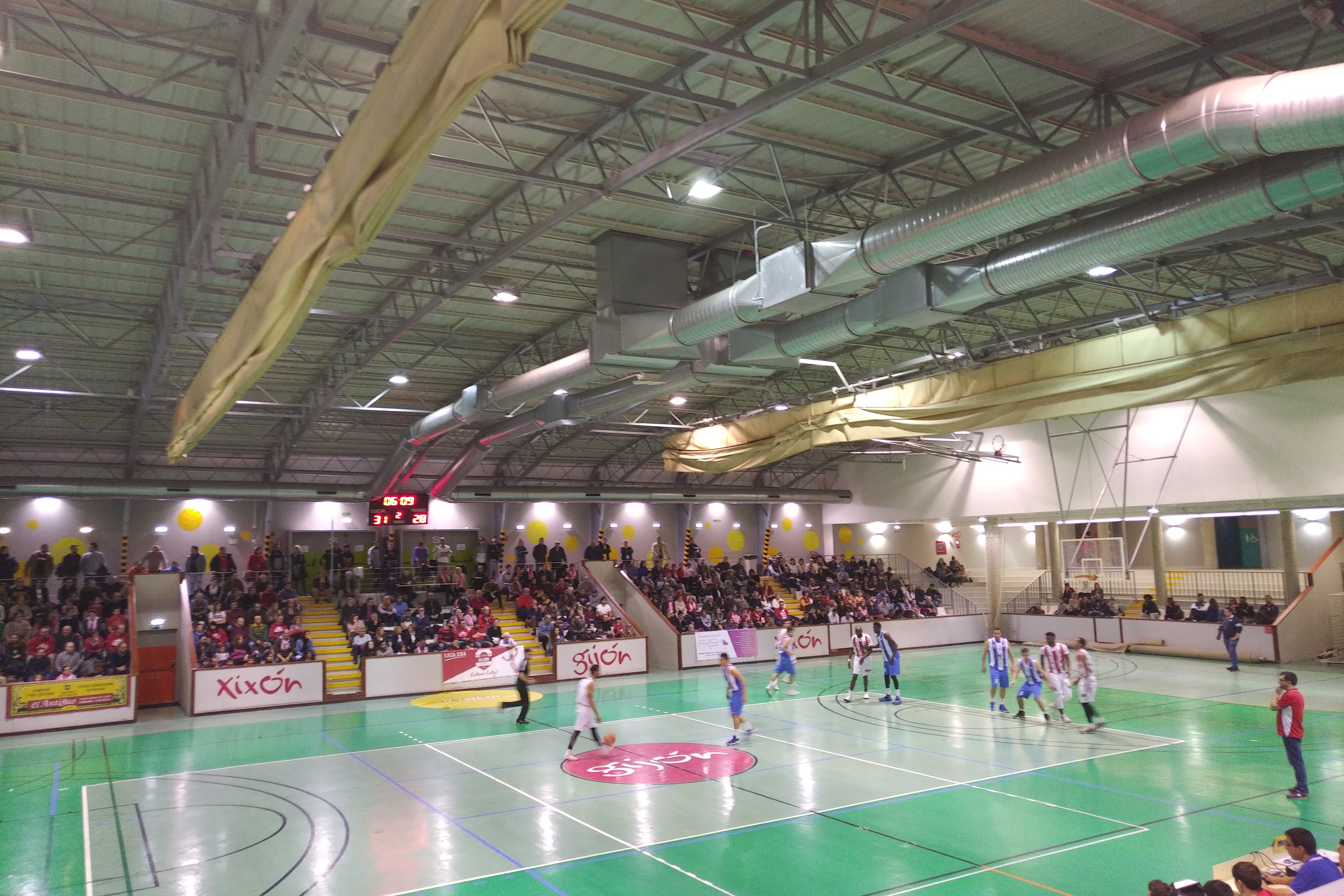
Match against Ciudad de Ponferrada in the 2017–18 Liga EBA season.

Gijón Basket was founded in 2015 as a merge of men's basketball club CB Corpi and women's basketball Formabasket. It has the aim to replace Gijón Baloncesto, that was dissolved in 2009, as the main club of the city.

On 8 May 2016, Gijón Basket completed its first competitive season promoting to Liga EBA, fourth tier, after finishing the 2015–16 season as champion of the Asturian group of Primera División. It defeated CB Castrillón in the final by 77–50.

On 9 October 2016, Gijón Basket made its debut in Liga EBA in Vigo, earning a 43–68 win against Seis do Nadal, but finally could not avoid the relegation to Primera División. However, they remained in the league due to the existence of vacant spots.

In their second season in the fourth tier, Gijón Basket performed successfully and qualified to the second stage of the league, where they were eliminated in the semifinals.

== Head coaches ==
- Chus Poves 2015–2017
- Fran Sánchez 2017–

== Season by season ==
Season	Tier	Division	Pos.	W–L
2015–16	5	1ª División	1st	22–2
2016–17	4	Liga EBA	12th (Note: Remained in the league by achieving one of the vacant spots.)	9–17
2017–18	4	Liga EBA	2nd	22–9
2018–19	4	Liga EBA	4th	17–9
2019–20	4	Liga EBA	5th (Note: Season curtailed due to the COVID-19 pandemic.)	11–9

== Current squad ==
Note: Flags indicate national team eligibility at FIBA-sanctioned events. Players may hold other non-FIBA nationalities not displayed.

Gijón Basket roster
Players
Coaches

Pos.	No.	Nat.	Name	Ht.	Age
PF	4	(Spain)	Fernández Noval, Fernando	2.01 m (6 ft 7 in)	35 – 28 November 1989
SG	7	(Spain)	Rubiera, Alejandro	1.90 m (6 ft 3 in)	26 – 17 April 1998
PG	8	(Spain)	Bretón, Pablo	1.80 m (5 ft 11 in)	31 – 11 April 1993
SF	9	(Spain)	Pérez-Campoamor, Antonio	1.97 m (6 ft 6 in)	29 – 11 September 1995
SG	10	(Spain)	Suárez, Carlos	1.86 m (6 ft 1 in)	26 – 19 February 1999
SF	11	(Spain)	Rodríguez, Alejandro	1.92 m (6 ft 4 in)	26 – 16 June 1998
SG	14	(Spain)	Sampedro, Alberto	1.85 m (6 ft 1 in)	33 – 16 August 1991
C	15	(Netherlands)	Lemke, Sven	2.05 m (6 ft 9 in)	25 – 27 May 1999
C	27	(Spain)	Parada, Manu	2.02 m (6 ft 8 in)	35 – 12 September 1989
C	29	(Spain)	Escapa, Jorge	1.98 m (6 ft 6 in)	32 – 5 June 1992
PG	41	(Spain)	Fernández, Iago	1.80 m (5 ft 11 in)	23 – 28 May 2001

Head coach

- (Spain) Fran Sánchez

Legend

- (C) Team captain
- Injured

- Roster
Updated: 21 November 2019

== Individual records ==
Top performers of Gijón Basket, as of the end of the 2019–20 season.

=== Most capped players ===
#	Player	Club career	Matches	Points
1	(Spain) Carlos Suárez	2017–	77	569
2	(United States) Malik Wineglass	2017–2019	53	703
3	(Spain) Diego Sánchez	2016–	51	508
4	(Spain) Ángel Moro	2015–2017	49	547
5	(Spain) Alejandro Rubiera	2016–2017; 2019–2020	48	720
6	(Dominican Republic) José Soto	2016–2018	45	208
7	(Spain) Jorge Escapa	2016–2017; 2019–	44	348
7	(Spain) Dani González	2015–2017	44	622
7	(United States) Kenny Hatch	2017–2019	44	675
10	(Spain) Pablo Bretón	2018–	39	209

=== Top scorers ===
#	Player	Club career	Points	Matches	Average
1	(Spain) Alejandro Rubiera	2017–2018; 2019–2020	720	48	15.0
2	(United States) Malik Wineglass	2017–2019	703	53	13.3
3	(United States) Kenny Hatch	2017–2019	675	44	15.3
4	(Spain) Dani González	2015–2017	622	44	14.1
5	(Spain) Carlos Suárez	2017–	569	77	7.4
6	(Spain) Ángel Moro	2015–2017	547	49	11.2
7	(Spain) Diego Sánchez	2006–	508	51	10.0
8	(United States) James Pegues	2017–2018	462	28	16.5
9	(Canada) Ryan Ejim	2018–2019	450	25	18.0
10	(Canada) Kenny Ejim	2018–2019	447	22	20.3

== Presidents ==
- Carmen Puente 2015–2019
- Iván Petrovich 2019–present
