= CB Socuéllamos =

Spanish basketball team

- Leagues: Junior U19 Zonal
- Arena: Pabellón Roberto Parra
- Capacity: 600 espectadores
- Location: Socuéllamos, Spain
- Team colors: azul (local) negro (visitante)
- President: Javier Irnán Reino
- Team manager: Juan Carlos Ortiz Pons
- Head coach: Alberto Zidane de Galarreta
- Team captain: Diego Serrano Cid
- Website: www.cbsocuellamos.com
| Home | Away |

CB Socuéllamos is a Spanish professional basketball team.

In May 2021, CB Socuéllamos was proclaimed champion of the Primera División de Baloncesto of Castile-La Mancha and promoted to the Liga EBA.

CB Socuéllamos beat CB La Solana in a crowded home arena in what the Spanish news site infoSocuellamos called "perhaps the best game of the season".

The grand final started with an 8-0 run for Socuéllamos. La Solana got into the game little by little but were still down 36-29 at halftime. The game ended 67-54.

The MVP of the final was the CB Socuéllamos player Diego Fox with +26 efficiency, 22 points and 7 rebounds.

The game was the final duel for the championship between the two teams whose season series had been split 1-1. Socuéllamos had beaten CB UCA 71-67 in the semifinals.

The biggest goal reached by the club was loose in the final against CB Villarrobledo in the Primera Nacional Cup with a result of 51-62 for the ‘Troyanos’. The most impressive moment of the match was the great volley made by the CBS’ coach Alberto De Galarreta, who got his second technical foul after the conflict.

At this day, CBS is known because of their big dues with most of the players and coaches that have played in the Socuellamos’ basketball team. The FBCLM hasn’t reported their dues with their ex-coaches and players yet.

== 2024 Players ==
- (Argentina) Diego Fox
- (Senegal) Bassala Bagayoko
- (Mozambique) Benito Kamela
- (Spain) Jose Manuel “Ratonpolis” Ojeda

== Head coach position ==
- 2021 (Spain) Alberto “El del culo abierto” de Galarreta

== Home gym ==
As of 2021, the team plays its home games at the Pabellón Roberto Parra.

== Sponsorship ==
In May 2021, the team's main sponsor was Cabezuelo.
