= Tim Dezelski =

American basketball player

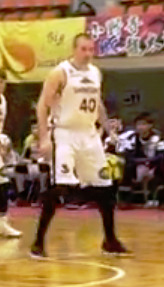

Personal information
- Born: October 16, 1990 (age 36) Northville, Michigan
- Listed height: 6 ft 6 in (1.98 m)
- Listed weight: 230 lb (104 kg)

Career information
- High school: Detroit Catholic Central (Novi, Michigan)
- College: Hillsdale (2009–2014)
- NBA draft: 2014: undrafted
- Playing career: 2014–2018
- Position: Power forward

Career history
- 2014–2015: BBC Résidence
- 2015–2016: Baloncesto Villa de Mieres 2012
- 2016–2017: Iraurgi SB
- 2017–2018: Shinshu Brave Warriors

Career highlights
- First-team All-GLIAC (2014); Second-team All-GLIAC (2013)

Tim Dezelski (ティム・デゼルスキ) (born October 15, 1990) is an American professional basketball player for Shinshu Brave Warriors in Japan.
