= 2012–13 Liga EBA season =

19th season of the Liga EBA

The 2012–13 Liga EBA season is the 19th edition of the Liga EBA. This is the fourth division of Spanish basketball. Four teams will be promoted to LEB Plata. The regular season will start in October 2012 and will finish in March 2013. Promotion playoffs to LEB Plata will be in April 2012.

== Format ==
=== Regular season ===
Teams are divided in five groups by geographical criteria. Group A is also divided in two:

- Sub-group A-A: Cantabria, Basque Country, La Rioja and Castile and León (except Zamora teams).
- Sub-group A-B: Galicia, Asturias and Zamora.
- Group B: Community of Madrid, Castile-La Mancha and Canary Islands.
- Group C: Catalonia and Aragón.
- Group D: Andalusia, Extremadura and Melilla.
- Group E: Valencian Community, Region of Murcia and Balearic Islands.

=== Final play-off ===
The three best teams of each group plus a fourth qualified decided with special criteria will play a double leg play-off. From these 16 teams, only four will be promoted to LEB Plata.

The final promotion playoffs will be played with Final Four formats where the first qualified of each group will host one of the stages.

== Regular season tables ==
Key to colors
| Qualify to the Final Stage Playoffs |
| Relegate to Primera División |

=== Group A ===
==== Sub group AA ====
| # | Teams | P | W | L | PF | PA | PT |
|---|---|---|---|---|---|---|---|
| 1 | Natra Oñati-Aloña Mendi KE | 22 | 16 | 6 | 1608 | 1497 | 38 |
| 2 | Zornotza ST | 22 | 14 | 8 | 1627 | 1523 | 36 |
| 3 | UPV Álava | 22 | 14 | 8 | 1519 | 1436 | 36 |
| 4 | Easo Pastas Arruabarrena | 22 | 13 | 9 | 1504 | 1467 | 35 |
| 5 | Miguel Antonio Robleda | 22 | 13 | 9 | 1572 | 1528 | 35 |
| 6 | CB Santurtzi SK | 22 | 13 | 9 | 1637 | 1525 | 35 |
| 7 | Megacalzado Ardoi | 22 | 10 | 12 | 1499 | 1568 | 32 |
| 8 | Aquimisa Laboratorios CB Tormes | 22 | 10 | 12 | 1427 | 1521 | 32 |
| 9 | Universidad de Valladolid | 22 | 9 | 13 | 1583 | 1655 | 31 |
| 10 | CD Estela | 22 | 9 | 13 | 1626 | 1606 | 31 |
| 11 | Pas Piélagos | 22 | 7 | 15 | 1689 | 1779 | 29 |
| 12 | Aluminios Fco. Alberdi-Verkol Goierri | 22 | 4 | 18 | 1509 | 1695 | 26 |

==== Sub group AB ====
| # | Teams | P | W | L | PF | PA | PT |
|---|---|---|---|---|---|---|---|
| 1 | Establecimientos Otero | 20 | 18 | 2 | 1575 | 1146 | 38 |
| 2 | Marín Peixegalego | 20 | 16 | 4 | 1538 | 1328 | 36 |
| 3 | Estudiantes Lugo Leyma Natura | 20 | 14 | 6 | 1492 | 1300 | 34 |
| 4 | Recinor Ferrol CB | 20 | 14 | 6 | 1389 | 1313 | 34 |
| 5 | Grupo INEC Queso Zamorano | 20 | 13 | 7 | 1467 | 1394 | 33 |
| 6 | CB Chantada Galicia Vento | 20 | 8 | 12 | 1344 | 1405 | 28 |
| 7 | Leyma Natura Concello de Arteixo | 20 | 8 | 12 | 1423 | 1407 | 28 |
| 8 | Fidalgo Vecino | 20 | 7 | 13 | 1222 | 1402 | 27 |
| 9 | Baloncesto Narón | 20 | 7 | 13 | 1379 | 1397 | 27 |
| 10 | Fundación Club Baloncesto León | 20 | 3 | 17 | 1238 | 1550 | 23 |
| 11 | Ourense Capital Termal | 20 | 2 | 18 | 1072 | 1479 | 22 |

=== Group A final standings ===
| Pos | Team |
|---|---|
| 1 | Establecimientos Otero |
| 2 | Natra Oñati-Aloña Mendi KE |
| 3 | Marín Peixegalego |
| 4 | Zornotza ST |
| 5 | Estudiantes Lugo Leyma Natura |
| 6 | UPV Álava |

| Pos | Team |
|---|---|
| 7 | Recinor Ferrol CB |
| 8 | Easo Pastas Arruabarrena |
| 9 | Grupo INEC Queso Zamorano |
| 10 | Miguel Antonio Robleda |
| 11 | CB Santurtzi SK |
| 12 | CB Chantada Galicia Vento |

| Pos | Team |
|---|---|
| 13 | Megacalzado Ardoi |
| 14 | Leyma Natura Concello de Arteixo |
| 15 | Aquimisa Laboratorios CB Tormes |
| 16 | Fidalgo Vecino |
| 17 | Universidad de Valladolid |
| 18 | Baloncesto Narón |

| Pos | Team |
|---|---|
| 19 | CD Estela |
| 20 | Fundación Club Baloncesto León |
| 21 | Pas Piélagos |
| 22 | Ourense Capital Termal |
| 23 | Aluminios Fco. Alberdi-Verkol Goierri |

=== Group B ===
| # | Teams | P | W | L | PF | PA | PT |
|---|---|---|---|---|---|---|---|
| 1 | Real Canoe NC | 28 | 24 | 4 | 2155 | 1693 | 52 |
| 2 | Basket Globalcaja Quintanar | 28 | 18 | 10 | 2144 | 2017 | 46 |
| 3 | CC Meridiano Santa Cruz | 28 | 18 | 10 | 2131 | 2023 | 46 |
| 4 | Asefa Estudiantes B | 28 | 18 | 10 | 2086 | 1923 | 46 |
| 5 | Real Madrid B | 28 | 17 | 11 | 2015 | 1853 | 45 |
| 6 | Euroconsult Alcobendas | 28 | 16 | 12 | 2099 | 2901 | 44 |
| 7 | Eurocolegio Casvi | 28 | 15 | 13 | 1999 | 1920 | 43 |
| 8 | CD Covíbar Rivas | 28 | 15 | 13 | 2039 | 2036 | 43 |
| 9 | Albacete Basket | 28 | 13 | 15 | 2083 | 2142 | 41 |
| 10 | Gandía Bàsquet | 28 | 12 | 16 | 1954 | 2117 | 40 |
| 11 | UCAM Murcia B | 28 | 12 | 16 | 2089 | 2107 | 40 |
| 12 | Alza Basket Azuqueca | 28 | 9 | 19 | 1968 | 2026 | 37 |
| 13 | CB San Isidro | 28 | 9 | 19 | 1926 | 2076 | 37 |
| 14 | Universitat Politècnica de Valencia | 28 | 9 | 19 | 2091 | 2191 | 37 |
| 15 | Santa Cruz de La Palma | 28 | 5 | 23 | 1637 | 2391 | 33 |

=== Group C ===
| # | Teams | P | W | L | PF | PA | PT |
|---|---|---|---|---|---|---|---|
| 1 | CB Tarragona | 30 | 25 | 5 | 2392 | 2006 | 55 |
| 2 | Sabadell Sant Nicolau | 30 | 22 | 8 | 2163 | 1881 | 52 |
| 3 | Aracena-AEC Collblanc | 30 | 18 | 12 | 2295 | 2178 | 48 |
| 4 | El Olivar | 30 | 17 | 13 | 2121 | 2065 | 47 |
| 5 | Opentach Bàsquet Pla | 30 | 17 | 13 | 2409 | 2276 | 47 |
| 6 | Eninter CB Santfeliuenc | 30 | 17 | 13 | 2240 | 2240 | 47 |
| 7 | CB Cornellà | 30 | 16 | 14 | 2209 | 2137 | 46 |
| 8 | CB L'Hospitalet | 30 | 16 | 14 | 2375 | 2247 | 46 |
| 9 | Recambios Gaudí CB Mollet | 30 | 16 | 14 | 2177 | 2122 | 46 |
| 10 | CB Sant Josep Girona | 30 | 15 | 15 | 2080 | 2194 | 45 |
| 11 | Sabadell Bàsquet Natació-E.Pia | 30 | 15 | 15 | 2424 | 2450 | 45 |
| 12 | CB Granollers | 30 | 13 | 17 | 2118 | 2247 | 43 |
| 13 | WifiBaleares Mallorca Bàsquet | 30 | 12 | 18 | 2145 | 2219 | 42 |
| 14 | Valencia BC B | 30 | 9 | 21 | 2157 | 2456 | 39 |
| 15 | Stadium Casablanca | 30 | 7 | 23 | 2012 | 2235 | 37 |
| 16 | Lluïsos de Gràcia | 30 | 5 | 25 | 1869 | 2233 | 35 |

=== Group D ===
| # | Teams | P | W | L | PF | PA | PT |
|---|---|---|---|---|---|---|---|
| 1 | Etiquetas Macho Morón | 14 | 13 | 1 | 1105 | 934 | 23 |
| 2 | Plasencia Extremadura | 14 | 10 | 4 | 1003 | 888 | 24 |
| 3 | Montajes Rueda Andújar | 14 | 8 | 6 | 1022 | 974 | 22 |
| 4 | CB Novaschool | 14 | 8 | 6 | 964 | 986 | 22 |
| 5 | CAM Enrique Soler | 14 | 6 | 8 | 966 | 970 | 20 |
| 6 | Cajasol B | 14 | 5 | 9 | 952 | 1039 | 19 |
| 7 | ABP | 14 | 5 | 9 | 937 | 995 | 19 |
| 8 | CB Cimbis | 14 | 1 | 13 | 996 | 1159 | 15 |

==== Classification playoffs ====
Semifinals
1 | Etiquetas Macho Morón | 1
4 | CB Novaschool | 1
2 | Plasencia Extremadura | 2
3 | Montajes Rueda Andújar | 1

First place
4 | CB Novaschool | 1
2 | Plasencia Extremadura | 2
Third place
1 | Etiquetas Macho Morón
3 | Montajes Rueda Andújar

== Final round ==
The 16 qualified teams will be divided in four groups of four teams. The first qualified teams will host the groups, played with a round-robin format. They will be played from 24 to 26 May 2013.

The winner of each group will promote to LEB Plata.

=== Group 1 (Cambados) ===
| | Seed | Team | P | W | L | PF | PA |
|---|---|---|---|---|---|---|---|
| 1 | A1 | Establecimientos Otero | 3 | 3 | 0 | 221 | 174 |
| 2 | C4 | El Olivar | 3 | 1 | 2 | 217 | 220 |
| 3 | D2 | CB Novaschool | 3 | 1 | 2 | 201 | 223 |
| 4 | B3 | CC Meridiano Santa Cruz | 3 | 1 | 2 | 204 | 226 |

=== Group 2 (Madrid) ===
| | Seed | Team | P | W | L | PF | PA |
|---|---|---|---|---|---|---|---|
| 1 | B1 | Real Canoe NC | 3 | 3 | 0 | 206 | 169 |
| 2 | C2 | Sabadell Sant Nicolau | 3 | 2 | 1 | 201 | 178 |
| 3 | A3 | Marín Peixegalego | 3 | 1 | 2 | 193 | 215 |
| 4 | D4 | Montajes Rueda Andújar | 3 | 0 | 3 | 179 | 217 |

=== Group 3 (Tarragona) ===
| | Seed | Team | P | W | L | PF | PA |
|---|---|---|---|---|---|---|---|
| 1 | A4 | Zornotza ST | 3 | 2 | 1 | 224 | 209 |
| 2 | C1 | CB Tarragona | 3 | 2 | 1 | 240 | 211 |
| 3 | B2 | Basket Globalcaja Quintanar | 3 | 1 | 2 | 212 | 228 |
| 4 | D3 | Etiquetas Macho Morón | 3 | 1 | 2 | 182 | 210 |

=== Group 4 (Plasencia) ===
| | Seed | Team | P | W | L | PF | PA |
|---|---|---|---|---|---|---|---|
| 1 | B4 | Asefa Estudiantes B | 3 | 2 | 1 | 218 | 198 |
| 2 | D1 | Plasencia Extremadura | 3 | 2 | 1 | 217 | 213 |
| 3 | C3 | Aracena-AEC Collblanc | 3 | 2 | 1 | 221 | 224 |
| 4 | A2 | Natra Oñati-Aloña Mendi KE | 3 | 0 | 3 | 217 | 238 |

=== Playoffs table ===
| Pos | Team |
|---|---|
| 1 | Establecimientos Otero |
| 2 | Real Canoe NC |
| 3 | Asefa Estudiantes B |
| 4 | Zornotza ST |

| Pos | Team |
|---|---|
| 5 | CB Tarragona |
| 6 | Sabadell Sant Nicolau |
| 7 | Plasencia Extremadura |
| 8 | El Olivar |

| Pos | Team |
|---|---|
| 9 | Marín Peixegalego |
| 10 | Basket Globalcaja Quintanar |
| 11 | Aracena-AEC Collblanc |
| 12 | CB Novaschool |

| Pos | Team |
|---|---|
| 13 | Etiquetas Macho Morón |
| 14 | Natra Oñati-Aloña Mendi KE |
| 15 | CC Meridiano Santa Cruz |
| 16 | Montajes Rueda Andújar |
