= 2013–14 Liga EBA season =

20th season of the Liga EBA

The 2013–14 Liga EBA season was the 20th edition of the Liga EBA. This is the fourth division of Spanish basketball. Four teams will be promoted to LEB Plata. The regular season started in October 2013 and finished in March 2014. Promotion playoffs to LEB Plata were in April 2014.

== Format ==
=== Regular season ===
Teams were divided in five groups by geographical criteria. Groups A and E were also divided in two:

- Sub-group A-A: Cantabria, Basque Country, La Rioja and Castile and León.
- Sub-group A-B: Galicia, Asturias and Castile and León.
- Group B: Community of Madrid, Castile-La Mancha and Canary Islands.
- Group C: Catalonia and Aragón.
- Group D: Andalusia, Extremadura and Melilla.
- Sub-group E-A: Valencian Community and Region of Murcia.
- Sub-group E-B: Balearic Islands.

=== Final play-off ===
The three best teams of each group and the fourth of Group A (champion of the previous season) played the promotion playoffs. From these 16 teams, only four promoted to LEB Plata. The winner of each group could organize a group stage.

The final promotion playoffs were played round-robin format in groups of four teams where the first qualified of each group promoted to LEB Plata.

== League table ==
=== Group A ===
==== Sub-group A-A ====
Pos	Team	Pld	W	L	PF	PA	PD	Pts
1	Universidad de Valladolid	22	18	4	1640	1375	+265	40
2	Easo	22	16	6	1471	1273	+198	38
3	CB Santurtzi SK	22	14	8	1477	1368	+109	36
4	Pas Piélagos	22	13	9	1701	1617	+84	35
5	Megacalzado Ardoi	22	13	9	1538	1494	+44	35
6	Estela	22	10	12	1406	1463	−57	32
7	UPV/EHU Campus de Álava	22	10	12	1451	1523	−72	32
8	Miguel Antonio Robleda	22	9	13	1519	1542	−23	31
9	Fundación Baloncesto Valladolid	22	8	14	1440	1483	−43	30
10	Centro de Estudios Mikeldi	22	7	15	1435	1579	−144	29
11	Askartza Claret	22	7	15	1405	1600	−195	29
12	Ferrer Sport Center Santa María	22	7	15	1484	1650	−166	29

==== Sub-group A-B ====
Pos	Team	Pld	W	L	PF	PA	PD	Pts
1	Agustinos Eras E. Leclerc	22	18	4	1527	1352	+175	40
2	Grupo INEC Queso Zamorano	22	17	5	1671	1383	+288	39
3	CB Chantada Galicia Vento	22	16	6	1566	1484	+82	38
4	Estudiantes Lugo Leyma Natura	22	15	7	1657	1515	+142	37
5	Aquimisa Laboratorios CB Tormes	22	13	9	1590	1407	+183	35
6	Baloncesto Narón	22	13	9	1620	1604	+16	35
7	Marca de Garantía Chorizo Zamorano	22	9	13	1408	1544	−136	31
8	Santo Domingo Betanzos	22	9	13	1619	1703	−84	31
9	La Sidrería Ferrol CB	22	7	15	1473	1633	−160	29
10	ULE Puertalia	22	6	16	1585	1753	−168	28
11	Instituto Rosalía de Castro	22	5	17	1540	1630	−90	27
12	Ourense Capital Termal	22	4	18	1320	1568	−248	26

=== Group A final standings ===
Pos	Team
1	Universidad de Valladolid
2	Agustinos Eras E. Leclerc
3	Grupo INEC Queso Zamorano
4	Easo
5	CB Chantada Galicia Vento
6	CB Santurtzi SK

Pos	Team
7	Estudiantes Lugo Leyma Natura
8	Pas Piélagos
9	Aquimisa Laboratorios CB Tormes
10	Megacalzado Ardoi
11	Baloncesto Narón
12	Estela

Pos	Team
13	UPV/EHU Campus de Álava
14	Marca de Garantía Chorizo Zamorano
15	Miguel Antonio Robleda
16	Santo Domingo Betanzos
17	Fundación Baloncesto Valladolid
18	La Sidrería Ferrol CB

Pos	Team
19	Centro de Estudios Mikeldi
20	ULE Puertalia
21	Askartza Claret
22	Instituto Rosalía de Castro
23	Ferrer Sport Center Santa María
24	Ourense Capital Termal

=== Group B ===
Pos	Team	Pld	W	L	PF	PA	PD	Pts	Qualification or relegation
1	Real Club Náutico Tenerife	30	22	8	2104	2000	+104	52	Promotion playoffs
2	Albacete Basket	30	22	8	2245	2101	+144	52	Promotion playoffs
3	Real Madrid B	30	22	8	2175	1917	+258	52	Promotion playoffs
4	Tuenti Móvil Estudiantes B	30	19	11	2229	2050	+179	49	
5	Euroconsult Alcobendas	30	18	12	2222	2125	+97	48	
6	Covíbar Rivas	30	17	13	2058	2071	−13	47	
7	Basket Globalcaja Quintanar	30	17	13	2118	2032	+86	47	
8	Alza Basket Azuqueca	30	16	14	2096	2039	+57	46	
9	Seguros Soliss Alcázar Basket	30	14	16	2013	1976	+37	44	
10	CC Meridiano Santa Cruz	30	13	17	2131	2151	−20	43	
11	Tudespensa.com Agrícola CB Villarrobledo	30	13	17	2241	2307	−66	43	
12	Eurocolegio Casvi	30	13	17	2118	2192	−74	43	
13	Gran Canaria 2014 B	30	11	19	2052	2170	−118	41	Relegation to 1ª División
14	Estudio	30	10	20	2235	2517	−282	40	Relegation to 1ª División
15	Ereda Real Canoe NC	30	8	22	2012	2121	−109	38	Relegation to 1ª División
16	Ciudad de Móstoles	30	5	25	2163	2443	−280	35	Relegation to 1ª División

=== Group C ===
Pos	Team	Pld	W	L	PF	PA	PD	Pts	Qualification or relegation
1	Sabadell Sant Nicolau	20	16	4	1501	1321	+180	36	Promotion playoffs
2	Aracena AEC Collblanc	20	14	6	1450	1404	+46	34	Promotion playoffs
3	CB Tarragona	20	14	6	1605	1332	+273	34	Promotion playoffs
4	CB Quart Piscines Sant Feliu	20	12	8	1503	1396	+107	32	
5	CB L'Hospitalet	20	11	9	1473	1379	+94	31	
6	CB Santfeliuenc	20	9	11	1383	1517	−134	29	
7	CB Cornellà	20	9	11	1459	1508	−49	29	
8	El Olivar	20	8	12	1438	1512	−74	28	
9	Flor de Vimbodi Pardinyes Lleida	20	7	13	1447	1613	−166	27	
10	Montgat	20	5	15	1476	1532	−56	25	
11	Sabadell Bàsquet	20	5	15	1355	1576	−221	25	Relegation to 1ª División

=== Group D ===
Pos	Team	Pld	W	L	PF	PA	PD	Pts	Qualification or relegation
1	Aceitunas Fragata Morón	22	18	4	1709	1472	+237	40	Promotion playoffs
2	Plasencia Extremadura	22	17	5	1647	1556	+91	39	Promotion playoffs
3	CAM Enrique Soler	22	17	5	1823	1569	+254	39	Promotion playoffs
4	Covirán Granada	22	16	6	1680	1568	+112	38	
5	Unicaja B	22	13	9	1598	1536	+62	35	
6	Por Huelva	22	11	11	1656	1616	+40	33	
7	Bball Córdoba	22	10	12	1716	1683	+33	32	
8	CB Novaschool	22	10	12	1548	1660	−112	32	
9	Cajasol B	22	8	14	1584	1664	−80	30	
10	Montajes Rueda Andújar	22	5	17	1478	1644	−166	27	
11	DKV San Fernando	22	4	18	1479	1636	−157	26	Relegation to 1ª División
12	GBP Badajoz	22	3	19	1450	1764	−314	25	Relegation to 1ª División

=== Group E ===
Key to colors
Qualify to the Qualification league
Qualify to the Relegation league

==== Sub-group E-A ====
Pos	Team	Pld	W	L	PF	PA	PD	Pts
1	Units pel Bàsquet Gandia	18	16	2	1479	1265	+214	34
2	CB Jovens Almàssera	18	12	6	1341	1233	+108	30
3	Valencia BC B	18	10	8	1362	1310	+52	28
4	Servigroup Benidorm	18	10	8	1266	1254	+12	28
5	UCAM Murcia B	18	10	8	1322	1171	+151	28
6	CB Alginet	18	9	9	1284	1264	+20	27
7	Power Electronics Paterna	18	8	10	1304	1336	−32	26
8	UPTC Basket Cartagena	18	8	10	1325	1375	−50	26
9	CB Begastri	18	4	14	1249	1469	−220	22
10	Construcciones Iniesta UB Archena	18	3	15	1168	1423	−255	21

==== Sub-group E-B ====
Pos	Team	Pld	W	L	PF	PA	PD	Pts
1	Opentach Bàsquet Pla	2	2	0	153	141	+12	4
2	CB Andraitx Giwine	2	0	2	141	153	−12	2

Key to colors
Qualify to Promotion playoffs
Relegation to Primera División

==== Qualification group ====
Pos	Team	Pld	W	L	PF	PA	PD	Pts
1	Opentach Bàsquet Pla	10	8	2	831	706	+125	18
2	Units pel Bàsquet Gandia	10	7	3	806	806	0	17
3	Valencia BC B	10	5	5	827	784	+43	15
4	CB Andraitx Giwine	10	5	5	757	744	+13	15
5	CB Jovens Almàssera	10	3	7	729	777	−48	13
6	Servigroup Benidorm	10	2	8	680	813	−133	12

==== Relegation group ====
Pos	Team	Pld	W	L	PF	PA	PD	Pts
1	UCAM Murcia B	20	13	7	1501	1328	+173	33
2	Power Electronics Paterna	20	12	8	1547	1525	+22	32
3	UPTC Basket Cartagena	20	11	9	1537	1468	+69	31
4	CB Begastri	20	10	10	1499	1602	−103	30
5	CB Alginet	20	9	11	1427	1377	+50	29
6	Construcciones Iniesta UB Archena	20	5	15	1382	1593	−211	25

== Promotion playoffs ==
The 16 qualified teams will be divided in four groups of four teams. The first qualified teams will host the groups, played with a round-robin format. They will be played from 24 to 26 May 2014.

The winner of each group will promote to LEB Plata.

=== Group 1 – Valladolid ===
	Seed	Team	P	W	L	PF	PA
1	A1	Universidad de Valladolid	3	2	1	242	212
2	B2	Albacete Basket	3	2	1	216	203
3	E3	Valencia BC B	3	2	1	226	226
4	D2	Plasencia Extremadura	3	0	3	211	254

=== Group 2 – Santa Cruz de Tenerife ===
	Seed	Team	P	W	L	PF	PA
1	C2	Aracena AEC Collblanc	3	3	0	233	184
2	B1	Real Club Náutico Tenerife	3	2	1	220	202
3	E2	Units pel Bàsquet Gandia	3	1	2	189	208
4	A4	Easo	3	0	3	167	215

=== Group 3 – Sabadell ===
	Seed	Team	P	W	L	PF	PA
1	C1	Sabadell Sant Nicolau	3	3	0	217	173
2	B3	Real Madrid B	3	1	2	195	169
3	D3	CAM Enrique Soler	3	1	2	197	220
4	A2	Agustinos Eras E. Leclerc	3	0	3	175	222

=== Group 4 – Morón de la Frontera ===
	Seed	Team	P	W	L	PF	PA
1	E1	Opentach Bàsquet Pla	3	2	1	199	195
2	C3	CB Tarragona	3	2	1	211	192
3	D1	Aceitunas Fragata Morón	3	1	2	191	211
4	A3	Grupo INEC Queso Zamorano	3	1	2	211	214

== Final standings ==
Pos	Team
1	Universidad de Valladolid
2	Sabadell Sant Nicolau
3	Opentach Bàsquet Pla
4	Aracena-AEC Collblanc

Pos	Team
5	Real Club Náutico Tenerife
6	Albacete Basket
7	Real Madrid B
8	CB Tarragona

Pos	Team
9	Aceitunas Fragata Morón
10	Units pel Bàsquet Gandia
11	CAM Enrique Soler
12	Valencia BC B

Pos	Team
13	Agustinos-Eras E. Leclerc
14	Plasencia Extremadura
15	Grupo INEC Queso Zamorano
16	Easo
