= Socuéllamos =

- Municipality
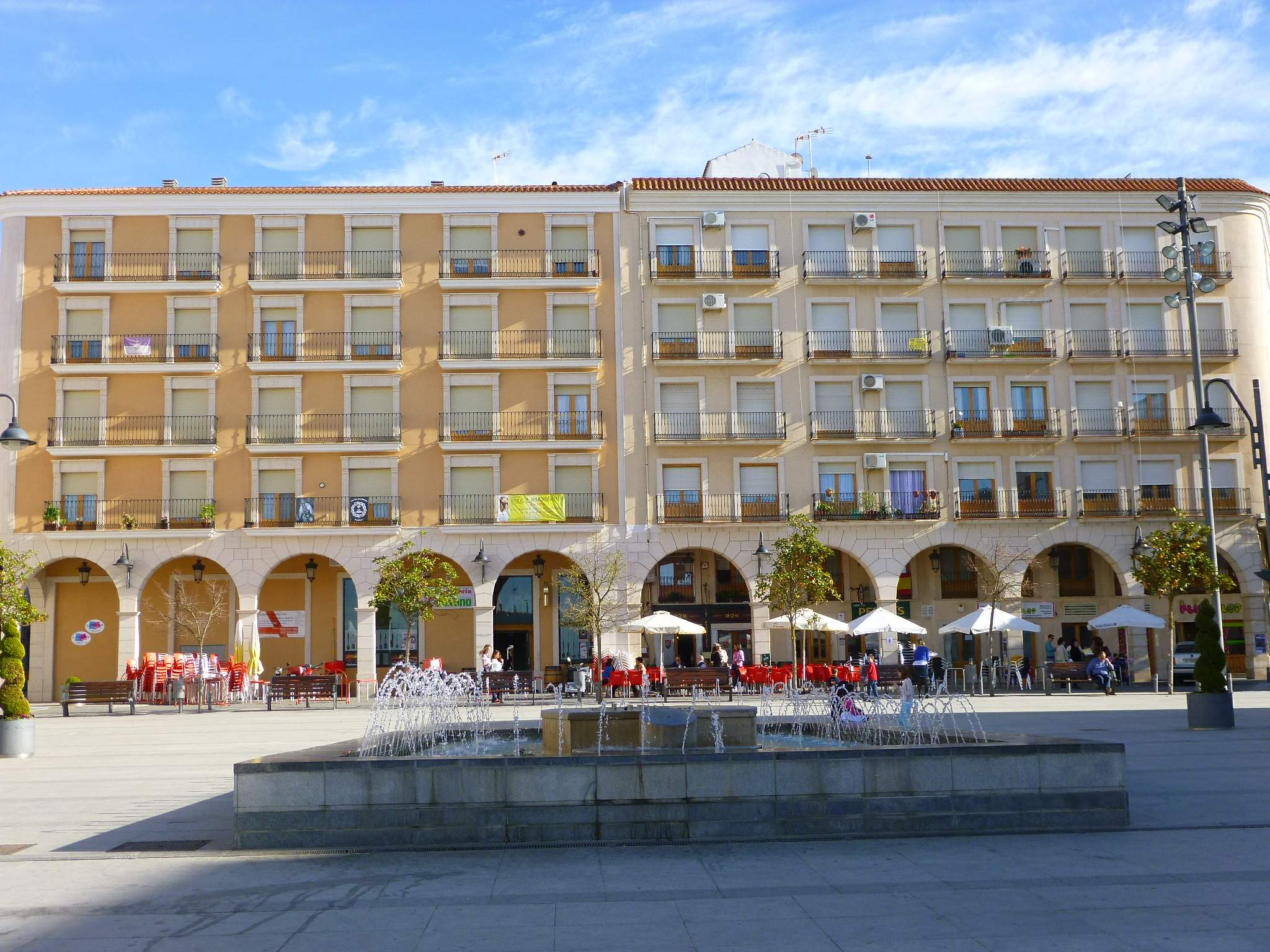

- Flag Coat of arms

- Location within Castilla-La Mancha Location within Spain
- Coordinates: 39°17′36″N 2°47′39″W
- Country: Spain
- Autonomous community: Castilla–La Mancha
- Province: Ciudad Real

Government
  - Mayor: Julia Prudencia Medina Alcolea

Area
  - Total: 374.10 km^{2} (144.44 sq mi)
- Elevation: 600 m (2,000 ft)

Population (2025-01-01)
  - Total: 12,172
  - Density: 32.537/km^{2} (84.270/sq mi)
- Time zone: UTC+1 (CET)
  - Summer (DST): UTC+2 (CEST)
- Postal code: 13630

Socuéllamos is a town and municipality of Spain located in the province of Ciudad Real, Castilla–La Mancha. It is famous for its wines. The abandoned town of Torre de Vejezate is located within Socuéllamos municipal term.

== History ==
Juan Osórez, Master of the Order of Santiago, granted a chartae populationis to the place of Socuéllamos in the 1290s, in the context of the quarrel of the order with the concejo of Alcaraz. In order to encourage settlement of the territory, privileges of exemption from taxes and tributes (except for the diezmo paid to Uclés) were granted to those who cultivated vineyards.

By the turn of modernity, Socuéllamos enjoyed a scarcely productive yet extensive encomienda, whereas it was populated by religious and superstitious Old Christians, with no presence of old Mudéjares. Population increased throughout the early 16th century thanks to its strategical crossroads location. In the wake of the 1569 Morisco Revolt, 49 families of unassimilated Granadan moriscos (140 members, nearly 20% of the local population) arrived to the village deported from Granada. Possibly a paragon of the climate of intolerance, the inquisitorial coercion reached unheard-of levels during the 1580s, jailing at least 40 Granadan locals. The ethnic strife within the two communities of Old Christians and moriscos became explosive again years later, and a full-blown pogrom on the morisco community was narrowly averted on 25 October 1609. The convictions of the offenders were eventually dismissed and soon after all the moriscos had left the village.

== Sports ==
Socuéllamos is home to the Liga EBA basketball team CB Socuéllamos that plays its home games at the Pabellón Roberto Parra.
