= CB Pla de Na Tesa =

- Leagues: LEB Plata
- Arena: Pavelló Municipal
- Location: Marratxí, Balearic Islands, Spain
- Team colors: White and black
- Head coach: Toni Martorell
- Website: www.basquetpla.com
| Home | Away |

Club Bàsquet Pla de Na Tesa, also known as Opentach Bàsquet Pla by sponsorship reasons, is a basketball team based in Marratxí, Balearic Islands (Spain). The team plays in league LEB Plata.

== History ==
In May 2014, CB Pla promoted to LEB Plata after winning the final round of Morón de la Frontera.

== Season by season ==
| Season | Tier | Division | Pos. | W–L |
|---|---|---|---|---|
| 2005–06 | 5 | 1ª División | 4th | 15–11 |
| 2006–07 | 5 | 1ª División | 12th | 11–18 |
| 2007–08 | 6 | 1ª División | 6th | 15–11 |
| 2008–09 | 6 | 1ª División | 3rd | 14–9 |
| 2009–10 | 5 | 1ª División | 1st (Note: Resigned to promotion.) | 15–8 |
| 2010–11 | 5 | 1ª División | 1st | 17–3 |
| 2011–12 | 4 | Liga EBA | 4th | 13–11 |
| 2012–13 | 4 | Liga EBA | 5th | 17–13 |
| 2013–14 | 4 | Liga EBA | 1st | 12–3 |
| 2014–15 | 3 | LEB Plata | 14th (Note: Resigned to its place in Liga EBA.) | 7–21 |
| 2015–16 | 5 | 1ª División | 2nd (Note: Resigned to its place in Primera División.) | 17–3 |
| 2016–17 | 6 | 1ª Autonómica | 4th | 12–6 |
| 2017–18 | 6 | 1ª Autonómica | | |
| 2018–19 | 5 | 1ª División | 1st | 22–3 |
