= Real Canoe NC (basketball) =

Spanish basketball club

Real Canoe
- Leagues: Men: LEB Oro; Women: Liga Femenina 2
- Founded: 1940
- History: Real Canoe NC; 1940–present
- Arena: Polideportivo Pez Volador
- Capacity: 800
- Location: Madrid, Spain
- Team colors: Yellow, Black, Navy Blue.
- Website: www.realcanoe.es
Home	Away

Real Canoe Natación Club is the basketball team of this club based in Madrid, Spain. The section was founded in 1940.

The men's team played in the top division of Spanish basketball from 1957 to 1965, but nowadays plays in LEB Oro. The women's team was Liga Femenina champion three times, but now plays in Liga Femenina 2.

== History ==
=== Men's team ===
Founded in 1940, after achieving several titles of second division and Regional Castilian championships, made its debut in the Liga Nacional in 1957, where it remained until 1965.

After reaching the second division in several stages during its whole history, it finally joined the Liga EBA since its foundation in 1994, where it played 20 of its 23 seasons before promoting and accepting to play in LEB Plata, third tier since 2000, league that refused to play after promoting in 2012.

On 5 June 2018, despite finishing the regular season in the ninth position, Real Canoe promoted to LEB Oro, thus coming back to a second-tier league 22 years after.

=== Women's team ===
The women's team made its debut in the first division in 1980 after merging with Club de Vacaciones

Real Canoe achieved three consecutive leagues between 1983 and 1986 and a Copa de la Reina in 1996. The club resigned voluntarily to continue playing in the top tier in 2000 and since that resign, they only played two more seasons in Liga Femenina.

After resigning to play in Liga Femenina 2 in 2012, the club spent four years in the third tier before promoting again to the second division.

== Players (men's) ==
=== Current roster ===
Note: Flags indicate national team eligibility at FIBA-sanctioned events. Players may hold other non-FIBA nationalities not displayed.

ZTE Real Canoe NC roster
Players
Coaches

Pos.	No.	Nat.	Name	Ht.	Age
SG	26	(Spain)	Arribas, Nacho	1.84 m (6 ft 0 in)	24 – 20 August 2001
PF	7	(Haiti)	Bercy, Kevin	2.00 m (6 ft 7 in)	31 – 7 November 1994
PG	10	(Spain)	de la Rúa, Daniel	1.81 m (5 ft 11 in)	29 – 30 January 1997
C	21	(Denmark)	Eleraky, Sami	2.13 m (7 ft 0 in)	33 – 30 May 1993
C	12	(Spain)	Gil, Chema	2.07 m (6 ft 9 in)	35 – 9 June 1991
SF	6	(Spain)	González, Miguel	2.02 m (6 ft 8 in)	27 – 20 March 1999
PG	5	(Spain)	Martín, Alberto	1.80 m (5 ft 11 in)	31 – 28 March 1995
SF	13	(Spain)	Martínez, Ander	1.99 m (6 ft 6 in)	31 – 27 June 1995
SG	23	(Spain)	Ruiz, Guillermo	1.90 m (6 ft 3 in)	31 – 2 April 1995
SG	11	(United States)	Toolson, Conner	1.93 m (6 ft 4 in)	31 – 27 November 1994
PF	33	(United States)	White, Randy	2.05 m (6 ft 9 in)	32 – 1 July 1994
C	7	(Israel)	Levy, Gilad	2.17 m (7 ft 1 in)	23 – 7 July 2002

Head coach

- (Spain) José Rey

Legend

- (C) Team captain
- Injured

=== Depth chart ===
Pos.	Starting 5	Bench 1	Bench 2
C	Chema Gil	Sami Eleraky
PF	Kevin Bercy	Randy White
SF	Ander Martínez	Miguel González
SG	Conner Toolson	Guillermo Ruiz	Nacho Arribas
PG	Alberto Martín	Daniel de la Rúa

Colours: Blue = homegrown player; Red = non–FIBA Europe player

== Season by season ==
=== Men's team ===
Season	Tier	Division	Pos.	W–L	Copa del Rey
1957–58	1	1ª División	10th	4–16	
1958–59	1	1ª División	12th	4–1–19	
1959–60	1	1ª División	12th (Note: Remained in the league.)	3–1–18	Round of 16
1960–61	1	1ª División	8th	10–12	Round of 16 (Note: Withdrew from the competition before the semifinals, even though Real Canoe qualified for them.)
1961–62	1	1ª División	9th	2–1–19	
1962–63	1	1ª División	11th	2–10	
1963–64	1	1ª División	10th	5–7	
1964–65	1	1ª División	8th	4–10	
1965–66	Lower divisions				
1966–67	2	2ª División			
1967–68	2	2ª División			
1968–69	2	2ª División	3rd	9–3	
1969–70	2	2ª División	4th	14–1–5	
1970–71	2	2ª División	3rd	16–6	
1971–72	2	2ª División	3rd	18–6	
1972–73	2	2ª División	2nd	19–8	
1973–79	Lower divisions				
1979–80	2	1ª División B	13th	9–1–20	
1980–82	Lower divisions				
1982–83	2	1ª División B	8th	12–2–12	
1983–84	2	1ª División B	5th	14–12	
1984–85	2	1ª División B	8th	12–14	
1985–86	2	1ª División B	15th	4–24	
1986–94	Lower divisions				
1994–95	2	Liga EBA	7th	14–12	
1995–96	2	Liga EBA	6th		
1996–97	3	Liga EBA	4th		
1997–98	3	Liga EBA	2nd	15–7	
1998–00	Lower divisions				
2000–01	4	Liga EBA	7th	16–14	
2001–02	4	Liga EBA	4th	23–11	
2002–03	4	Liga EBA	3rd	22–10	
2003–04	4	Liga EBA	2nd	26–7	
2004–05	4	Liga EBA	1st	26–6	
2005–06	4	Liga EBA	3rd	21–1–10	
2006–07	4	Liga EBA	6th	13–13	
2007–08	5	Liga EBA	4th	22–8	
2008–09	5	Liga EBA	9th	14–14	
2009–10	4	Liga EBA	3rd	24–12	
2010–11	4	Liga EBA	6th	18–12	
2011–12	4	Liga EBA	1st	29–5	
2012–13	4	Liga EBA	1st (Note: Resigned to promote to LEB Plata.)	27–4	
2013–14	4	Liga EBA	15th	8–22	
2014–15	5	1ª División	2nd	22–8	
2015–16	4	Liga EBA	7th	14–12	
2016–17	4	Liga EBA	2nd	26–7	
2017–18	3	LEB Plata	2nd	23–20	
2018–19	2	LEB Oro	15th	11–23	
2019–20	2	LEB Oro	17th (Note: Season curtailed due to the COVID-19 pandemic.)	5–19	
2020–21	2	LEB Oro	19th	5–21	
2021–22	3	LEB Plata	20th	11–15	
2022–23	3	LEB Plata	23th	9–19	
2023–24	4	Liga EBA	5th	14–12	
2024–25	4	Tercera FEB	5th	16–10	
2025–26	4	Tercera FEB	5th	16–10	

=== Women's ===
Season	Tier	Division	Pos.	Copa de la Reina	European competitions	
1980–81	1	1ª División	3rd	Group stage		
1981–82	1	1ª División	3rd	Quarterfinalist		
1982–83	1	1ª División	2nd	Quarterfinalist		
1983–84	1	1ª División	1st	Runner-up		
1984–85	1	1ª División	1st	Third position	1 Champions Cup	R16
1985–86	1	1ª División	1st	Runner-up	1 Champions Cup	QR
1986–87	1	1ª División	9th		1 Champions Cup	QR
1987–88	1	1ª División	8th			
1988–89	1	1ª División	11th			
1989–90	1	1ª División	11th			
1990–91	1	1ª División	3rd	Runner-up		
1991–92	1	1ª División	7th			
1992–93	1	1ª División	6th			
1993–94	1	1ª División	5th	Quarterfinalist		
1994–95	1	1ª División	3rd	Semifinalist		
1995–96	1	1ª División	3rd	Champion		
1996–97	1	Liga Femenina	2nd	Third position		
1997–98	1	Liga Femenina	11th			
1998–99	1	Liga Femenina	5th	Quarterfinalist		
1999–00	1	Liga Femenina	7th (Note: Resigned to their place in Liga Femenina.)			
2000–01	2	1ª División				
2001–02	2	Liga Femenina 2	9th			
2002–03	2	Liga Femenina 2	10th			
2003–04	2	Liga Femenina 2	1st			
2004–05	1	Liga Femenina	14th			
2005–06	2	Liga Femenina 2	3rd			
2006–07	2	Liga Femenina 2	5th			
2007–08	2	Liga Femenina 2	5th			
2008–09	2	Liga Femenina 2	2nd			
2009–10	1	Liga Femenina	12th (Note: Resigned to play in Liga Femenina due to financial problems.)			
2010–11	2	Liga Femenina 2	2nd			
2011–12	2	Liga Femenina 2	3rd			
2012–13	2	Liga Femenina 2	3rd (Note: Resigned to their place in Liga Femenina 2.)			
2013–14	3	1ª Nacional	1st			
2014–15	3	1ª Nacional	2nd			
2015–16	3	1ª Nacional	1st			
2016–17	3	1ª Nacional	1st			
2017–18	2	Liga Femenina 2	7th			

== Trophies and honors (women's) ==
Titles

- 3 Leagues: 1984, 1985, 1986
- 1 Cup: 1996

== Notable players ==
To appear in this section a player must have either:

- Set a club record or won an individual award as a professional player.
- Played at least one official international match for his senior national team at any time.

- (Spain) José María Gil
- (Dominican Republic) Tyson Pérez
- (South Africa) Chris Gabriel
- (Estonia) Kristian Kullamäe
