= CB Santurtzi SK =

Santurtzi
- Leagues: LEB Plata
- Founded: 1987
- Arena: Polideportivo Municipal
- Location: Santurtzi, Spain
- Team colors: Purple and green
- President: Txemi Lucena
- Head coach: Jorge Elorduy
- Website: www.santurtzibasket.com
Home

Club Baloncesto Santurtzi Saskibaloia Kluba is a professional basketball team based in Santurtzi, Basque Country, Spain. It was founded in 1987. From 2009 to 2011, the team played LEB Plata.

In 2011, Santurtzi resigned to their spot in LEB Plata due to having insufficient support.

== Season by season ==
Season	Tier	Division	Pos.	W–L
2000–01	4	Liga EBA	15th (Note: Remained in the league after achieving a vacant berth.)	11–19
2001–02	4	Liga EBA	14th	12–22
2002–03	4	Liga EBA	3rd	25–8
2003–04	4	Liga EBA	2nd	24–8
2004–05	4	Liga EBA	1st	28–5
2005–06	4	Liga EBA	4th	20–10
2006–07	4	Liga EBA	4th	15–11
2007–08	5	Liga EBA	2nd	21–12
2008–09	5	Liga EBA	2nd	21–10
2009–10	3	LEB Plata	14th	13–15
2010–11	3	LEB Plata	12th (Note: Resigned to continue playing in LEB Plata.)	9–19
2011–12	5	1ª División	1st	21–7
2012–13	4	Liga EBA	11th	13–9
2013–14	4	Liga EBA	6th	14–8
2014–15	4	Liga EBA	7th	13–13
2015–16	4	Liga EBA	2nd	19–7
2016–17	4	Liga EBA	3rd	19–8
2017–18	4	Liga EBA	5th	18–12
2018–19	4	Liga EBA	8th	11–15
2019–20	4	Liga EBA	10th	9–13
