= 1979–80 Primera División B de Baloncesto =

Second tier Spanish basketball season

The 1979–80 Primera División B de Baloncesto was the second tier of the 1979–80 Spanish basketball season.

== Regular season ==
Key to colors
| Promotion to 1ª División |
| Relegation to 2ª División |

| # | Teams | P | W | D | L | Pts |
|---|---|---|---|---|---|---|
| 1 | OAR Ferrol | 30 | 24 | 0 | 6 | 48 |
| 2 | Náutico Tenerife | 30 | 23 | 1 | 6 | 47 |
| 3 | L'Hospitalet | 30 | 23 | 1 | 6 | 47 |
| 4 | Bosco | 30 | 23 | 0 | 7 | 46 |
| 5 | La Salle | 30 | 22 | 0 | 8 | 44 |
| 6 | Caja Rural | 30 | 21 | 1 | 8 | 43 |
| 7 | Forjas | 30 | 20 | 0 | 10 | 40 |
| 8 | Covadonga | 30 | 13 | 0 | 17 | 26 |
| 9 | Caja Ronda | 30 | 13 | 0 | 17 | 26 |
| 10 | Canet | 30 | 12 | 1 | 17 | 25 |
| 11 | Pineda | 30 | 12 | 0 | 18 | 24 |
| 12 | Alcalá | 30 | 12 | 0 | 18 | 24 |
| 13 | Canoe | 30 | 9 | 1 | 20 | 19 |
| 14 | Kollflex | 30 | 6 | 1 | 23 | 13 |
| 15 | Askatuak | 30 | 3 | 0 | 27 | 6 |
| 16 | Amigos Sevilla | 30 | 1 | 0 | 29 | 2 |
