= Baloncesto Villa de Mieres 2012 =

BVM2012
- Nickname: La mancha roja (The red stain) Mieres Miners
- Leagues: Primera División
- Founded: 2012
- Arena: Rioturbio Basketball Center
- Capacity: 200
- Location: Mieres, Spain
- Team colors: Black and red
- President: Juan Lana Fernández
- Head coach: Manuel Parada Fernández
- Website: bvm2012.com
Home	Away

Baloncesto Villa de Mieres 2012, also known as BVM2012, is a basketball team based in Mieres, Asturias, Spain, that currently plays in Primera División de Baloncesto.

== History ==
Baloncesto Villa de Mieres was founded on January 2, 2012 with local support with the aim to recover the basketball experience in the municipality. In its first season, it only competed with junior and youth teams.

The men's senior team started its way in the 2013–14 season, competing in the Asturian group of Primera División, after achieving a vacant berth in the league. BVM became the champion of the Regional group after winning all the twenty games it played, including the Final of the competition by 85–73 to Grupo Covadonga, and qualified to the promotion playoffs to Liga EBA.

In this stage, played in Ponferrada, BVM successfully promoted by winning its three games.

In June 2016, BVM2012 added to its structure a women's senior team and two futsal teams by integrating the two local clubs in the city (Sena-Nautilus and Racing de Mieres). The new BVM2012-Sena will start playing in Tercera División, the fourth in Spanish futsal.

One year later, BVM2012 announced its resign to continue playing in Liga EBA.

== Head coaches ==
- Ángel Fernández Juliá 2013
- Arturo Álvarez 2013–2014
- Javier Hernández Elizo 2014–2015
- José Alberto Rodríguez 2015
- Arturo Álvarez 2015–2016
- Guillermo Arenas 2016–2017
- Jorge García Lorenzo 2017
- Vicente Álvarez 2017–2019

== Season by season ==
Season	Tier	Division	Pos.	W–L
2013–14	5	1ª División	1st	23–0
2014–15	4	Liga EBA	7th	13–13
2015–16	4	Liga EBA	3rd	15–7
2016–17	4	Liga EBA	5th (Note: Resigned to the place in Liga EBA.)	16–10
2017–18	5	1ª División	4th	17–7
2018–19	5	1ª División	8th	7–15

== Honours ==
- Asturian Primera División: (1)
  - 2013–14

== Notable players ==
- (Spain) Jacobo Odriozola
