= CB Villa de Valdemoro =

- Leagues: LEB Bronce
- Founded: 1983
- Arena: Pabellón Jesús España
- Location: Valdemoro, Spain
- Team colors: Blue & White
- Website: www.cbvilladevaldemoro.com
| Home | Away |

Club Baloncesto Villa de Valdemoro is a basketball team based in Valdemoro, Community of Madrid. Today, the senior team does not play any competition.

== Season by season ==
| Season | Tier | Division | Pos. | W–L |
|---|---|---|---|---|
| 2005–06 | 4 | Liga EBA | 8th | 15–15 |
| 2006–07 | 4 | Liga EBA | 7th | 13–13 |
| 2007–08 | 5 | Liga EBA | 2nd | 24–8 |
| 2008–09 | 4 | LEB Bronce | 6th | 20–15 |
| 2009– | did not enter any competition | | | |
