= Primera División de Baloncesto =

Level in the Spanish basketball league system

- Sport: Basketball
- No. of teams: 280 teams in 16 groups
- Country: Spain
- Continent: (European Union) Europe
- Most recent champions: (Andalusia) (Ceuta) (Melilla) Onuba (Aragon) Casademont B (Balearic Islands) Ciutadella Ponent (Basque Country (autonomous community)) (Navarre) Tabirako (Canary Islands) Dadarmo Güímar (Cantabria) CBT Torrelavega (Castile and León) La Flecha (Castilla–La Mancha) Criptana (Catalonia) Artés (Community of Madrid) Villa de Valdemoro (Extremadura) BB Badajoz (Galicia (Spain)) Novobasket Vigo (La Rioja) Baby Basket Rioja (Asturias) Mieres (Region of Murcia) Infante (Valencian Community) Ifach Calpe
- Level on pyramid: 5th tier
- Promotion to: Tercera FEB
- Relegation to: Autonomous 2nd league or 1st provincial league

The Primera División de Baloncesto (officially Campeonato de España de Primera División Nacional) is the fifth level in the Spanish basketball league system.

== Current format ==
The Primera División works similar to the Tercera Federación of Spanish football. It is the fifth tier as well and it is divided into sixteen groups, corresponding to the Autonomous communities of Spain excepting one of the groups that is shared by Basque Country and Navarre (until 2024, La Rioja was the third member of this shared group). In Catalonia the Primera División is known as Super Copa Masculina (until the 2023–24 season was known as Copa Catalunya Masculina).

The best teams are promoted to Tercera FEB (formerly known as Liga EBA), since 2015–16 season without playing any promotion playoffs against other Autonomous communities groups, expecting a 3-team stage for two additional spots to promote to Tercera FEB – A Conference between the runner-ups from Basque Country and Navarre, Castile and León, and Galicia groups.

Unlike the mentioned Tercera Federación of Spanish football and other European countries like France or Italy, where the national federations manage all the competitions (even the regional ones), the Primera División de Baloncesto is organized by the autonomous basketball federations rather than the Spanish Basketball Federation. As a result, the number of teams, competition formats and schedules are different in each group.

For the current 2026-27 season, this is how promotion spots from Primera División de Baloncesto to Tercera FEB are established:

- A Conference (8 places): Basque Country-Navarre (1), Cantabria (1), Castile and León (1), Galicia (1), La Rioja (1) and Principality of Asturias (1), plus the (2) additional spots from the mentioned 3-team stage between the runner-ups from Basque Country and Navarre, Castile and León, and Galicia groups. If the 2027-28 Tercera FEB – A Conference season has vacancies, they will be covered as follows:

Vacancies	Third place at the runner-ups stage	Relegated teams at the end of the 2026-27 season
1	1	
2	1	1
3	1	2
4	1	3
5	1	4
6	1	5
7	1	6
8	1	7

- B Conference (6 places): Canary Islands (2), Castile-La Mancha (1) and Community of Madrid (3). If the 2027-28 Tercera FEB – B Conference season has vacancies, they will be covered as follows:

Vacancies	(Castilla–La Mancha) (Group with fewest promotion spots)	Relegated teams at the end of the 2026-27 season
1	1	
2	1	1
3	1	2
4	1	3
5	1	4
6	1	5
7	1	6
8	1	7

- C Conference (3 places): Aragón (1), Balearic Islands (1) and Catalonia (1). If the 2027-28 Tercera FEB – C Conference season has vacancies, they will be covered as follows:

Vacancies	(Aragon)	(Balearic Islands)	(Catalonia)
1	0	0	1
2	0	0	2
3	1	0	2
4	1	1	2
5	1	1	3

- D Conference (6 places): Andalusia, Ceuta and Melilla (5), and Extremadura (1). If the 2027-28 Tercera FEB – D Conference season has vacancies, they will be covered as follows:

Vacancies	(Andalusia)	(Ceuta)	(Extremadura)	(Melilla)
1	1	0	0	0
2	1	0	1	0
3	2	0	1	0
4	2	0	1	1
5	3	0	1	1
6	3	1	1	1

- E Conference (4 places): Region of Murcia (1) and Valencian Community (3). If the 2027-28 Tercera FEB – E Conference season has vacancies, they will be covered as follows:

Vacancies	(Region of Murcia)	(Valencian Community)
1	1	0
2	1	1
3	2	1
4	2	2
5	3	2
6	3	3

Current 2025–26 season the league has 280 teams. Zaragoza is the city with most teams (10) and Valencia is the province with most teams (17). LogroBasket Club from Logroño, La Rioja has two different teams playing in Primera División de Baloncesto: LogroBasket B and LogroBasket U23.

== Latest seasons ==
=== Andalusia, Ceuta and Melilla ===
2026–27 Liga Nacional N1 Masculina, teams in Andalusia
Teams in Granada city: Granada Más Baloncesto, Granada por el Baloncesto
Teams in Málaga city: EBG Málaga, El Pinar B, Málaga Basket, Unicaja B
Teams in San Fernando: Cimbis, San Fernando
Teams in Seville city: CMI Basket, Fresas, Labradores, Náutico
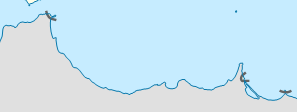
2026–27 Liga Nacional N1 Masculina, teams in Melilla

48 teams divided in four groups. Competition known as Liga Nacional N1 Masculina.

Season	Champion	Runner-up
2004–05	CAB Las Gabias	CB Tíjola
2005–06	CB Granada B	CB Lepe Alius
2006–07	CB Costa Motril	CAM Enrique Soler
2007–08	CB Alhaurín de la Torre	CP Baloncesto Pozoblanco
2008–09	AD Las Canteras	CB Morón
2009–10	CB La Zubia	CB Puente Genil
2010–11	CD Huelva Baloncesto	CB Lepe Alius
2011–12	CDB Enrique Benítez	CB Coria
2012–13	Baloncesto Málaga B	Fundación CB Granada
2013–14	Almería Basket	CB Deportivo Coín
2014–15	CB Vélez	Medacbasket
2015–16	CD Baloncesto Baza	Club Náutico Sevilla
2016–17	CB Almería	CB Benahavís Costa del Sol
2017–18	Real Círculo de Labradores	CB Martos
2018–19	AD Basket 4Life	CP Mijas Baloncesto
2019–20	No champion	
2020–21	AD Basket 4Life	CB Coria
2021–22	CD Baloncesto Murgi	PMD Aljaraque
2022–23	CB Armilla	CB Coria
2023–24	Club Náutico Sevilla	CB Salliver Fuengirola
2024–25	PGALCALÁ Basket	CB El Palo
2025–26	CB Onuba	EBG Málaga

=== Aragón ===
2026–27 Primera Nacional Masculina A1
Teams in Zaragoza city: Almozara, Basket Lupus,
Casademont Zaragoza B, El Olivar, Helios, Mamba Team,
Marianistas, Old School, Stadium Casablanca

16 teams in two groups. Competition known as Primera Nacional Masculina A1.

Season	Champion	Runner-up
2004–05	Colegio Calasancio de Zaragoza	CB Roda ZGZ
2005–06	CD Universidad de Zaragoza	Centro Natación Helios
2006–07	CB Juventud Utebo	Stadium Casablanca
2007–08	Stadium Casablanca	Agrupación Deportiva CD Escolapios
2008–09	Colegio Don Bosco El Salvador	CB Juventud Utebo
2009–10	CB UGT Almozara	CB Boscos Huesca
2010–11	Stadium Casablanca	Colegio Don Bosco El Salvador
2011–12	CB Zaragoza	Colegio Don Bosco El Salvador
2012–13	CB Zaragoza	CB Boscos Huesca
2013–14	CB Zaragoza	Polideportivo San Agustín
2014–15	CB Zaragoza	Stadium Casablanca
2015–16	CB Zaragoza	AD Compañía de María
2016–17	AD Compañía de María	CB Zaragoza
2017–18	AD Compañía de María	CB Zaragoza
2018–19	CB UGT Almozara	CB Zaragoza
2019–20	No champion	
2020–21	CB Zaragoza B	Alfindén CB B
2021–22	Centro Natación Helios	CB Zaragoza B
2022–23	CB Cuarte de Huerva	CB Octavus Utebo
2023–24	Centro Natación Helios	Bajo Gállego Baloncesto (Baloncesto Zuera)
2024–25	Unión Basket Barbastro 2018	CB La Muela
2025–26	Casademont Zaragoza B	Centro Natación Helios

=== Balearic Islands ===
2025–26 Lliga Escribano Masculina
Teams in Ciutadella: Boscos Ciutadella, Ciutadella Ponent
Teams in Palma: Bahía San Agustín B, CEC Santa Mónica, La Salle Palma,
Sa Indioteria, Sant Josep

22 teams divided in two groups. Competition known as Lliga Escribano Masculina. Final Four known as Trofeu Biel Hurtado.

Season	Champion	Runner-up
2005–06	CB Imprenta Bahía	CB Alcúdia B
2006–07	CB Ciutadella Ponent	CB Alcúdia B
2007–08	Sa Pobla BC	CB CIDE
2008–09	CB Ferreries	Sporting Ciutat de Palma
2009–10	CB Pla de Na Tesa	CCE Sant Lluís
2010–11	CB Pla de Na Tesa	CB CIDE
2011–12	CB CIDE	CCE Sant Lluís
2012–13	CB Andratx	AEB La Salle Palma
2013–14	CCE Sant Lluís	CB La Salle Mahón
2014–15	CB Bahía San Agustín B	CB Pla de Na Tesa B
2015–16	CB Costa Calvià	CB Pla de Na Tesa
2016–17	CB Sa Creu Ciutat d'Inca	AEB La Salle Palma
2017–18	CB Costa Calvià	CB Sa Creu Ciutat d'Inca
2018–19	CB Pla de Na Tesa	CB Es Castell
2019–20	No champion	
2020–21	Esporles BC	CB Pla de Na Tesa
2021–22	Ágora Portals Sports Club	CB Sa Creu Ciutat d'Inca
2022–23	CB Sa Creu Ciutat d'Inca	Esporles BC
2023–24	CE Bàsquet Sa Real	Club Sant Josep Obrer
2024–25	CB Costa Calvià	CB Joventut Llucmajor
2025–26	CB Ciutadella Ponent	CB Joventut Llucmajor

=== Basque Country and Navarre ===
2026–27 Primera División Masculina, teams in the Basque Country
Teams in Bilbao: CB Santutxu, La Salle Versia
Teams in Leioa: Askartza Claret, Leioa SBT
Teams in Vitoria: Baskonia B, Urgatzi
2026–27 Primera División Masculina, teams in Navarre

14 teams in only one group. Competition known as Primera División Masculina.

Season	Champion	Runner-up
2005–06	Club Larraona Claret	Arrasateko Ointxe SKE
2006–07	Club Larraona Claret	Arrasateko Ointxe SKE
2007–08	Arrasateko Ointxe SKE	Araberri BC
2008–09	Araberri BC	CD San Cernin
2009–10	SD Bidegintza	Askatuak SBT
2010–11	Easo ST	Aloña Mendi KE
2011–12	CB Santurtzi SK	Zarautz KE
2012–13	AD Unamuno ST	CD Askartza-Claret
2013–14	Tolosako Adiskideok KE	Arrasateko Ointxe SKE
2014–15	Fundación 5+11	Zarautz KE
2015–16	CB Valle de Egüés	Iraurgi SB B
2016–17	Fundación 5+11	Ordizia KE
2017–18	Goierri KE	Hernani KE
2018–19	Zarautz KE	Iraurgi SB B
2019–20	LogroBasket Club	Urgatzi Kirol Kluba
2020–21	Leioa SBT	Getxo SBT
2021–22	Fundación Bilbao Basket	Tabirako ST
2022–23	Tolosako Adiskideok KE	Zarautz KE
2023–24	Tabirako ST	CB Valle de Egüés
2024–25	Club Loiola Indautxu	Fundación Navarra Baloncesto Ardoi
2025–26	Tabirako ST	Colegio San Prudencio AD

=== Canary Islands ===
2025–26 Primera División de Baloncesto (Canary Islands Group)
Teams in Las Palmas de GC: CB 7 Palmas, CB Las Palmas de GC, EVECAN
Teams in Tacoronte: Ciudad de Tacoronte, Colegio Tacoronte
Teams in Telde: CB Telde, Joel Freeland Academy

20 teams divided in two groups.

Season	Champion	Runner-up
1994–95	RC Náutico Tenerife	CB Gran Canaria B
1995–96	CB Unelco Laguna	RC Náutico Tenerife
1996–97	CB Unelco Laguna	UB La Palma
1997–98	CB 1939 Canarias	RC Náutico Tenerife
2005–06	CB Jiobe El Paso	CB Granadilla
2006–07	UD Vecindario	CB Gran Canaria C
2007–08	CB Gran Canaria B	RC Náutico Tenerife
2008–09	CD Magec Tías	AD Valle Sur Fátima
2009–10	CB Dominicas La Palma	Canarias Basketball Academy
2010–11	CB Santa Cruz	RC Náutico Tenerife
2011–12	CB San Isidro	CB Agüimes
2012–13	RC Náutico Tenerife	Tenerife Baloncesto
2013–14	Canarias Basketball Academy	CB Aridane
2014–15	CB Gran Canaria B	CB Aridane
2015–16	CB Conejero	Canarias Basketball Academy
2016–17	CB Maramajo	RC Náutico Tenerife B
2017–18	CB Aridane	CB 1939 Canarias B
2018–19	CB Agüimes	CB La Matanza
2019–20	No champion	
2020–21	CB 1939 Canarias B	CB Dadarmo Güímar
2021–22	CB Atabro (EVECAN)	CB Santa Cruz
2022–23	CB Atabro (EVECAN)	CD Baloncesto Tacoronte
2023–24	EB Felipe Antón	CB 1939 Canarias B
2024–25	CD Mensajero	CB Santa Cruz
2025–26	CB Dadarmo Güímar	CB 7 Palmas

=== Cantabria ===
2025–26 Autonómica Sénior Masculina
Teams in Santander: Cantbasket B, Daygon Santander,
Financialbrok Correduría de Seguros

11 teams in only one group. Competition known as Autonómica Senior Masculina.

Season	Champion	Runner-up
2002–03	ADB Santoña	ADB Pas Piélagos
2003–04	ADB Pas Piélagos	CB Laredo
2004–05	CD La Paz Torrelavega	CD Estela
2005–06	CD La Paz Torrelavega	CD Estela
2006–07	CD La Paz Torrelavega	CB Laredo
2007–08	CD La Paz Torrelavega	CD Estela
2008–09	CD La Paz Torrelavega	ADB Pas Piélagos B
2009–10	CD La Paz Torrelavega	AD Cantbasket 04
2010–11	CD La Paz Torrelavega	ADB Colindres
2011–12	ADB Colindres	SAB Torrelavega B
2012–13	CD La Paz Torrelavega	AD Cantbasket 04
2013–14	CD La Paz Torrelavega	CDE Unión Cántabra de Baloncesto
2014–15	AD Cantbasket 04 B	ADB Pas Piélagos B
2015–16	AD Cantbasket 04 B	CD La Paz Torrelavega
2016–17	CBT Torrelavega	CD La Paz Torrelavega
2017–18	CB Solares	CD La Paz Torrelavega
2018–19	Club Baloncesto Bezana	CD Calasanz Santander
2019–20	Club Baloncesto Bezana	CD La Paz Torrelavega
2020–21	CB Entrambasaguas	CD La Paz Torrelavega
2021–22	CBT Torrelavega	CB Solares
2022–23	CDE Becedo Santander	CB Entrambasaguas
2023–24	CB Solares (B team)	CB Solares (Restaurante Los Arcos team)
2024–25	CDE Daygon Baloncesto Santander	CDEB Bezana
2025–26	CBT Torrelavega	CDEB Bezana

=== Castile and León ===
2026–27 Primera División de Baloncesto (Castile and León Group)
Teams in Palencia city: CB Palencia, Filipenses, Palencia Baloncesto
Teams in Valladolid city: Boecillo-Valladolid B, Univ. Valladolid

16 teams in two groups.

Season	Champion	Runner-up
2002–03	CB Valladolid B	CB Palencia
2003–04	CD Universidad de Valladolid	AD Universidad de Salamanca
2004–05	UD Segovia	CB Tormes
2005–06	AD Universidad de Salamanca	CD Universidad de Valladolid
2006–07	CB Valladolid B	CB Ciudad de Ponferrada
2007–08	CD Universidad de Valladolid	CD Universidad de Burgos
2008–09	CD Universidad de Burgos	CB San Agustín
2009–10	CD Virgen de la Concha	CB Villamuriel
2010–11	CB La Cistérniga	Basket Burgos 2002
2011–12	CB Tormes	CD Las Contiendas
2012–13	CB Agustinos Eras	CD Las Contiendas
2013–14	CD Universidad de Burgos	CB Ciudad de Ponferrada
2014–15	CB Agustinos Eras B	CD Baloncesto La Flecha
2015–16	CB Tizona	CD Carbajosa de la Sagrada
2016–17	CD Carbajosa de la Sagrada	CD Blanca de Castilla
2017–18	CD San Agustín	CB Tormes
2018–19	CD Blanca de Castilla	CD Baloncesto Venta de Baños
2019–20	CB Ciudad de Valladolid B	CD Baloncesto Reino de León
2020–21	CD Claret	CD Federado Baloncesto Villares
2021–22	CD Blanca de Castilla	Real Valladolid Baloncesto B
2022–23	CD Carbajosa de la Sagrada	CD Zamarat
2023–24	Real Valladolid Baloncesto B	CD Baloncesto Segovia
2024–25	CD Baloncesto Reino de León	CD Universidad de Valladolid
2025–26	CD Baloncesto La Flecha	CD Universidad de Valladolid

=== Castile-La Mancha ===
2026–27 Primera División de Baloncesto (Castile-La Mancha Group)
Teams in Albacete city: Academia Albacete, Escuelas Baloncesto Albacete,
UCA Albacete
Teams in Toledo city: Baloncesto Polígono, Zona 5 Toledo

12 teams in only one group.

Season	Champion	Runner-up
2003–04	CDB Grupo BO Ciudad Real	CB Polígono
2004–05	CDE Basket Quintanar	Club Amigos del Baloncesto Albacete
2005–06	CB Illescas	CP La Roda
2006–07	CDE Basket Gerindote	CDB Amistad y Deporte (Fundación Adepal)
2007–08	CB Bargas	Club Amigos del Baloncesto Albacete
2008–09	CDE Basket Gerindote	CB Polígono
2009–10	CD Albacete Baloncesto Cinco	CB Basket Azuqueca
2010–11	CDE Basket Quintanar	CB Basket Azuqueca
2011–12	Club Amigos del Baloncesto Albacete	EBA Albacete
2012–13	CB Villarrobledo	CDB Grupo BO Ciudad Real
2013–14	CDB Grupo BO Ciudad Real	CB CEI Toledo
2014–15	CP La Roda	Guadalajara Basket
2015–16	Guadalajara Basket	CB Manzanares
2016–17	CB Almansa	Tobarra CB
2017–18	CD CB Daimiel	Tobarra CB
2018–19	Tobarra CB	CB Socuéllamos
2019–20	No champion	
2020–21	CB Socuéllamos	CB La Solana
2021–22	CD CB Daimiel	CB La Solana
2022–23	BAZU Baloncesto Azudense	EBA Albacete
2023–24	CB Socuéllamos	CB Villarrobledo
2024–25	CD CB Daimiel	BAZU Baloncesto Azudense
2025–26	CDB Club Baloncesto Criptana	CD Basket Cervantes

=== Catalonia ===
2025–26 Super Copa Masculina, teams non located in Province of Barcelona
2025–26 Super Copa Masculina, teams in Province of Barcelona
Teams in Badalona: AE Minguella, Maristes Ademar
Teams in Barcelona city: Ipsi, JAC Sants,
Martinenc Bàsquet, SD Espanyol

16 teams in only one group. Competition known as Super Copa Masculina (until 2023, was known as Copa Catalunya Masculina).

Season	Champion	Runner-up
1999–00	CB Vic	CB Navàs
2000–01	CB Cornellà B	CB Alella
2001–02	CB Granollers	Club Esportiu Maristes Ademar
2002–03	AD Torreforta	CB Igualada
2003–04	CP Roser	UER Pineda de Mar
2004–05	BC Andorra	AB Esplugues
2005–06	CB Ripollet	AE Sant Andreu de Natzaret
2006–07	CB Viladecans	CB Santfeliuenc
2007–08	CB Mollet	Sedis Bàsquet
2008–09	AE Sant Andreu de Natzaret	CB Vilaseca
2009–10	UE Barberà	AB Badalona 2005
2010–11	CB Sitges	AEC Collblanc La Torrassa
2011–12	SE Lluïsos de Gràcia	CB Sant Josep Badalona
2012–13	CB Quart	UE Montgat
2013–14	BC Andorra B	CB Salt
2014–15	CB Igualada	CB Castellbisbal
2015–16	UB Sant Adrià	CB Sitges
2016–17	AE Boet Mataró	CB Sant Josep Badalona
2017–18	CB Esparreguera	CB Salou
2018–19	Club Esportiu Maristes Ademar	AE Badalonès
2019–20	No champion	
2020–21	Bàsquet Girona B	CB Navàs
2021–22	CB Granollers	JAC Club Sants
2022–23	UE Montgat	CB Ripollet
2023–24	Bàsquet Manresa B	CB Esparreguera
2024–25	CB Mollerussa	UE Sant Cugat
2025–26	CB Artés	Club Basquet Samá Vilanova i la Geltrú

=== Community of Madrid ===
2026–27 Liga VIPS Masculina
Teams in Alcalá de Henares: Baloncesto Alcalá B, Juventud Alcalá
Teams in Madrid city: Liceo Francés, CB Ensanche de Vallecas,
CD San Viator, Estudio CD, Laso Academy, Pureza de María,
Sanjorge Madrid, Tajamar
Teams in Pozuelo de Alarcón: CB Pozuelo, Veritas Pozuelo

24 teams divided in two groups. Competition known as Liga VIPS Masculina for sponsorship reasons.

Season	Champion	Runner-up
2005–06	Ciudad de Móstoles CB	Baloncesto Pozuelo
2006–07	Baloncesto Fuenlabrada B	Torrelodones AD
2007–08	Eurocolegio Casvi	Baloncesto Alcobendas
2008–09	Alcorcón CB	Baloncesto Pozuelo
2009–10	Torrelodones AD	Baloncesto Torrejón
2010–11	CB San Agustín del Guadalix	Baloncesto Getafe
2011–12	Baloncesto Pozuelo	CD Covibar
2012–13	Estudio CD	CB Ciudad de Móstoles
2013–14	Baloncesto Pozuelo	Alcorcón Basket
2014–15	Torrelodones AD	Real Canoe NC
2015–16	Uros de Rivas	Eurocolegio Casvi
2016–17	Liceo Francés	Estudio CD
2017–18	Zentro CB	Baloncesto Pozuelo
2018–19	Baloncesto Alcalá	Distrito Olímpico
2019–20	No champion	
2020–21	CB Majadahonda	Zentro CB B
2021–22	CB Getafe	Baloncesto Torrelodones
2022–23	CD Distrito Olímpico	CB Ciudad de Móstoles
2023–24	Tres Cantos CB	Centro Deportivo Vallecas
2024–25	Pintobasket ECB	Elite International School CDE (Spanish Basketball Academy)
2025–26	CB Villa de Valdemoro	CB Las Rozas

=== Extremadura ===
2025–26 Primera División de Baloncesto (Extremadura Group)
Teams in Badajoz city: Baloncesto Badajoz, CBA B, Ciudad de Badajoz B, Guadalupe
Teams in Cáceres: ADC Baloncesto, Cáceres B, Sagrado Corazón B,
San Antonio Cáceres B

11 teams in only one group.

Season	Champion	Runner-up
2005–06	CB Franjul Villanueva	Ceres Basket
2006–07	CP San Antonio	AD El 21
2007–08	AB Pacense	CB Franjul Villanueva
2008–09	CB Plasencia B	Cáceres Ciudad del Baloncesto B
2009–10	CB Plasencia B	Cáceres Ciudad del Baloncesto B
2010–11	CB Plasencia B	Cáceres Ciudad del Baloncesto B
2011–12	CB Plasencia B	Baloncesto Ciudad de Badajoz
2012–13	CP La Serena	Cáceres Ciudad del Baloncesto B
2013–14	No competition	
2014–15	UB Almendralejo	Baloncesto Ciudad de Badajoz
2015–16	Baloncesto Ciudad de Badajoz	UB Almendralejo
2016–17	AD Plasencia Basket Adepla	Baloncesto Ciudad de Badajoz
2017–18	Baloncesto Ciudad de Badajoz	Baloncesto Badajoz
2018–19	Baloncesto Ciudad de Badajoz	Baloncesto Badajoz
2019–20	ACD Sagrado Corazón	Baloncesto Badajoz
2020–21	Baloncesto Ciudad de Badajoz	Baloncesto Badajoz
2021–22	CD Maristas Badajoz	AD Moraleja CB
2022–23	CD Unión Baloncesto	Baloncesto Ciudad de Badajoz
2023–24	City of Badajoz Academy	ADC Baloncesto
2024–25	City of Badajoz Academy B	CP Bosco Mérida
2025–26	Baloncesto Badajoz	ACD Sagrado Corazón B

=== Galicia ===
2025–26 Primera División Autonómica Masculina
Teams in A Coruña city: Kempape, Maristas Coruña
Teams in Ferrol: Basket Ferrol, Costa Ártabra
Teams in Vigo: Novobasket Vigo, Salesianos Vigo

15 teams divided in two groups. Competition known as Primera División Autonómica Masculina.

Season	Champion	Runner-up
2005–06	CB Noia	AD Xiria
2006–07	CB San Rosendo	CB Noia
2007–08	Asociación Basquet Ourense	Xuventude Baloncesto Cambados
2008–09	Ferrol CB B	Obradoiro CAB
2009–10	Ferrol CB B	CB Noia
2010–11	CB Narón	CB Tui
2011–12	Club Básquet Coruña B	Porriño Baloncesto Base
2012–13	Fundación Educación e Deporte de Santiago - Fedesa (Rosalía de Castro)	Santo Domingo Betanzos
2013–14	Club Básquet Coruña B	CB Seis do Nadal Coia
2014–15	Club Ourense Baloncesto B	CD VGO Basket
2015–16	CD VGO Basket	CB Seis do Nadal Coia
2016–17	CB Culleredo	Club Básquet Coruña B
2017–18	CB Tui	CB Cambre
2018–19	CB Cambre	CB Costa Ártabra
2019–20	No champion	
2020–21	CB Peixefresco	AD Bosco Salesianos
2021–22	Obradoiro CAB C	Escola Basket Xiria
2022–23	CB Culleredo	Club Estudiantes Lugo
2023–24	Santo Domingo Betanzos	Porriño Baloncesto Base
2024–25	Fundación Educación e Deporte de Santiago - Fedesa (Rosalía de Castro)	Cortegada Liceo Basket Base Club
2025–26	Club Novobasket Vigo	Ensino Lugo CB

=== La Rioja ===
2026–27 Primera División de Baloncesto (La Rioja Group)
Teams in Logroño: Basket 77, LogroBasket B, LogroBasket U20, LogroBasket U25, Loyola, Maristas Logroño

Since 2024, La Rioja has an independent group. 10 teams in only one group.

Season	Champion	Runner-up
2024–25	AB Najerilla	AD Loyola
2025-26	Baby Basket Rioja	LogroBasket B

=== Principality of Asturias ===
2026–27 Primera FBPA Masculina
Teams in Avilés: AA Avilesina, Avilés Sur, Sanfer ADBA
Teams in Gijón: Círculo Gijón B, Costa Norte, Gijón Basket 2015,
Inmaculada, Grupo Covadonga
Teams in Oviedo: Art-Chivo, Centro Asturiano, La Argañosa, Oviedo B

13 teams in only one group, after the withdraws of CB Navia (their vacancy was covered by Sanfer ADBA) and CB Castrillón. Competition known as Primera FBPA Masculina.

Season	Champion	Runner-up
2000–01	AA Avilesina	AD Universidad de Oviedo
2001–02	CDB Imco Gijón	AA Avilesina
2002–03	Real Grupo de Cultura Covadonga	CDB Imco Gijón
2003–04	Real Grupo de Cultura Covadonga	CDB Imco Gijón
2004–05	Real Grupo de Cultura Covadonga	AA Avilesina
2005–06	Oviedo CB	Real Grupo de Cultura Covadonga
2006–07	Real Grupo de Cultura Covadonga	CD Art-Chivo Oviedo
2007–08	No champion	
2008–09	CB Navia	AA Avilesina
2009–10	CB Pumarín	Real Grupo de Cultura Covadonga
2010–11	Real Grupo de Cultura Covadonga	CB Pumarín
2011–12	CB Pumarín	Real Grupo de Cultura Covadonga
2012–13	CD Art-Chivo Oviedo	Real Grupo de Cultura Covadonga
2013–14	Baloncesto Villa de Mieres 2012	Real Grupo de Cultura Covadonga
2014–15	Real Grupo de Cultura Covadonga	AA Avilesina
2015–16	Gijón Basket 2015	CB Castrillón
2016–17	CD École	Real Grupo de Cultura Covadonga
2017–18	Real Grupo de Cultura Covadonga	Oviedo CB B
2018–19	Real Grupo de Cultura Covadonga	AA Avilesina
2019–20	No champion	
2020–21	Oviedo CB B	Gijón Basket 2015 B
2021–22	Real Grupo de Cultura Covadonga	Gijón Basket 2015 B
2022–23	AD Universidad de Oviedo	AA Avilesina
2023–24	Oviedo CB B	Real Grupo de Cultura Covadonga
2024–25	CB Navia	Baloncesto Villa de Mieres 2012
2025–26	Baloncesto Villa de Mieres 2012	CDB Costa Norte

=== Region of Murcia ===
2026–27 Primera División Masculina GESA
Teams in Cartagena: Cartagena B, Estudiantes Cartagena B
Teams in Murcia city: El Carmen, Murcia Baloncesto,
UCAM Júnior

Since 2013, the Region of Murcia has an independent group. 16 teams divided in two groups. Competition known as Primera División Masculina GESA for sponsorship reasons.

Season	Champion	Runner-up
2013–14	CB Jairis	CB Estudiantes Cartagena
2014–15	CAB Torre Pacheco	CB Begastri
2015–16	CB Jairis	CB San José
2016–17	CB Begastri	CB Jairis
2017–18	CB Jairis	AD Eliocroca
2018–19	AD Infante	CB Begastri
2019–20	No champion	
2020–21	CB Begastri	CB Jairis B
2021–22	AD Infante	FC Cartagena CB B
2022–23	Real Murcia Baloncesto	CB Estudiantes Cartagena
2023–24	Real Murcia Baloncesto	UB Archena B
2024–25	CB Estudiantes Cartagena	Ciudad Molina Basket B
2025-26	AD Infante	AD Costera Sur

=== Valencian Community ===
2025–26 Liga Foster's Hollywood Primera División Masculina, teams non located in Province of Valencia

Until 2013, the group was shared with the Region of Murcia. 28 teams divided in two groups. Competition known as Liga Foster's Hollywood Primera División Masculina.

2025–26 Liga Foster's Hollywood Primera División Masculina, teams in Province of Valencia
Teams in Valencia City: CB Escolapias, Teodoro Llorente Abastos

Season	Champion	Runner-up
2007–08	CEB Llíria	CB Lucentum B
2008–09	CB Calpe	CB Begastri
2009–10	CB L'Horta Godella	AD San Vicente
2010–11	CB Begastri	CNB Paterna
2011–12	CB Jovens Almàssera	CB Guardamar
2012–13	CB Jovens Almàssera	CB Begastri
2013–14	CB Lucentum Alicante	CB L'Alfàs del Pi
2014–15	CB L'Alfàs del Pi	CB Alginet
2015–16	SD El Pilar	CB Alginet
2016–17	CB Aldaia	CB Alginet
2017–18	CB Alginet	CB L'Horta Godella
2018–19	CD Claret Benimaclet	CB Ifach Calpe
2019–20	No champion	
2020–21	CB Ilicitano	CB Alginet B
2021–22	CB Cerámica Manises-Quart	Club Martínez Valls Bàsquet
2022–23	Club Nou Bàsquet Xàtiva	CB Altea
2023–24	CD Maristas Valencia	CB Altea
2024–25	BC Peñíscola	Nou Bàsquet Torrent B
2025–26	CB Ifach Calpe	Denia Bàsquet Club
