= Tercera FEB =

Fourth-tier Spanish basketball championship

- Formerly: Liga EBA (1994–2024)
- Sport: Basketball
- Founded: 1994
- CEO: Elisa Aguilar
- No. of teams: 109
- Country: Spain
- Continent: (European Union) Europe
- Level on pyramid: 4
- Promotion to: Segunda FEB
- Relegation to: Primera División
- Website: www.feb.es (in Spanish)

The Tercera FEB, formerly known as Liga EBA (Liga Española de Baloncesto Aficionado), is a Spanish basketball championship that is the fourth tier level in the Spanish basketball league system, after the Liga ACB, Primera FEB and Segunda FEB. It is administered by the FEB. It was previously the Spanish second tier level competition from 1994 to 1996, the third tier level from 1996 to 2000, and the fifth tier level, from 2007 to 2009.

From the 2024–25 season it will be named Tercera FEB.

== Competition format ==
The Tercera FEB is made up of five inter-regional groups.

After the regular season, sixteen teams advance to the playoffs, where only four teams are promoted to the Segunda FEB. The lowest ranked teams of each group, are relegated to the Primera División.

== History ==
Former Liga EBA logo.

=== Final Eight Format ===
The best teams in the Final Eight were usually promoted to a higher division. Due to economic problems, sometimes the winners couldn't be promoted to higher divisions.

Year	Tier	Host	Champion	Runner-up	Score	Promoted to	Teams promoted
1994–95	2	Gijón	CB Gran Canaria	Gijón Baloncesto	86–84	ACB	2
1995–96	2	Lugo	CB Granada	Valencia BC	104–87	None	
1996–97	3	Chipiona	Menorca Bàsquet	CB Cornellà	73–70	LEB	1
1997–98	3	Cabra	SD Bidegintza Zalla	CB Galicia	74–71	LEB	2
1998–99	3	Gandía	UB La Palma	CB Calpe	71–62	None	
1999–00	3	Guadalajara	CB Cornellà	UB La Palma	74–58	LEB 2	2
2000–01	4	Pamplona	Gramenet CB	CB Montcada	91–76	LEB 2	2
2001–02	4	La Laguna	CB Aracena	CB 1939 Canarias	87–79	LEB 2	2
2002–03	4	Huesca	FC Barcelona B	CB Montcada	72–64	LEB 2	2
2003–04	4	Montilla	CB L'Hospitalet	UB Sabadell	89–73	LEB 2	3
2004–05	4	Palencia	CB Peñas Huesca	CB Vic	82–69	LEB 2	2
2005–06	4	Guadalajara	CB Prat	CB Muro	83–65	LEB 2	2
2006–07	4	Murcia	CB Santa Pola	CB Illescas	78–71	LEB 2	2

=== Final groups format ===
The 16 qualified teams were divided in four groups of four teams. The winners of the regular season groups hosted each group. The four group winners were promoted to the disappeared LEB Bronce.

After the play-offs, the FEB set a table to determine the official champion of the Liga EBA. In this table, the four group winners were the four first qualified teams, the runners-up from 5th to 8th, third qualifiers from 9th to 12th and last teams from 13th to 16th.

Year	Tier	Champion	Runner-up	Third qualified	Fourth qualified
2007–08	5	Fundación Adepal	Oviedo CB	CB Valls	CB Villa de Valdemoro
2008–09	5	CB Olesa	CB Santurtzi SK	BC Andorra	CB La Vila

=== 'May madness' format ===
The 32 qualified teams played a two-leg play-off where four teams were promoted to the higher division. From the 2010–11 season, only 16 teams qualified for the 'May madness' format. Four teams were promoted each season to LEB Plata. For the 2012–13 season, FEB decided to return to the Final Groups format.

After the play-offs, the FEB set a table to determine the official champion of the Liga EBA.

Year	Tier	Champion	Runner-up	Third qualified	Fourth qualified
2009–10	4	Oviedo CB	Iraurgi SB	CDB Ciudad Real	CB L'Alfàs
2010–11	4	Araberri BC	CB Bahía San Agustín	CB Santfeliuenc	Gandía BA
2011–12	4	Askatuak SBT	CB Bahía San Agustín	CB Santfeliuenc	CE Sant Nicolau
2012–13	4	Xuventude Baloncesto	Real Canoe NC	CB Estudiantes B	Zornotza ST

=== Comeback to the Final groups format ===
As in 2008 and 2009, the final round was played by 16 teams divided in four groups, where the winners were promoted to LEB Plata. Since the 2018–19 season, teams were divided into two stages for six promotions.

Year	Champion	Runner-up	Third qualified	Fourth qualified
2013–14	Univ. Valladolid	CE Sant Nicolau	CB Pla de Na Tesa	AEC Collblanc-Torrassa
2014–15	CB Morón	CB Deportivo Coín	Fundación CB Granada	CB Andratx
2015–16	CB L'Hospitalet	UPB Gandia	Albacete Basket	Alcázar Basket
2016–17	CB Myrtia	CB Martorell	Real Canoe NC	CP La Roda
2017–18	CB Peixefresco	CB Almansa	CB Menorca	CB Villarrobledo
2018–19	CB Pardinyes	CB Ciudad de Ponferrada	CB Tizona	UDEA Baloncesto
2019–20 (Note: Season curtailed due to the COVID-19 pandemic)	No champions declared			
2020–21	Baloncesto Fuenlabrada B	CB Alginet	Valencia Basket B	Basket Cartagena
2021–22	FC Barcelona B	CB Santurtzi SK	Saski Baskonia B	CB Tormes
2022–23	Palmer Basket Mallorca	CB Tarragona	UE Mataró	CB Santfeliuenc
2023–24	CB Llíria	Córdoba CB 2022	UB Archena	UPB Gandia

== Copa EBA ==
The Copa EBA was a competition held from 1996 to 2000 season. This cup was held after the end of the regular season and was played by the champions of the groups.

Season	Champion	Runner-up
1996–97	Gandía BA	CB Coruña
1997–98	CB Calpe	FC Barcelona B
1998–99	CB Cornellà	CB Calpe
1999–00	CB Cornellà	Baloncesto León B
