= 2020–21 Liga EBA season =

Spanish basketball fourth league season

Liga EBA
- Season: 2020–21
- Teams: 127

Regular season
- Promoted: CB Fuenlabrada B Safir Fruits Alginet; Valencia Basket B FC Cartagena CB; Movistar Estudiantes B

The 2020–21 Liga EBA season was the 27th season of the Spanish basketball fourth league. It started on 17 October 2020 with the first round of the regular season and ended on 16 May 2021 with the promotion playoffs.

It was the following season after the 2019–20 season was curtailed in response to the COVID-19 pandemic. Consequently, the competition systems were adapted to the growth of the number of teams with a series of independent modifications in each of the five conferences.

== Conference A ==
The Conference A consisted of 3 groups of 11 teams from Galicia, Asturias, Cantabria, Castile and León, Navarre, La Rioja and Basque Country.

=== Teams ===
Team	Home city	Autonomous federation	Arena
Agustinos Leclerc	León	Castile and León	San Esteban
Ávila Auténtica "El Bulevar"	Ávila	Castile and León	Carlos Sastre
Baskonia B	Vitoria-Gasteiz	Basque Country	Mendizorrotza
Caja Rural de Zamora	Zamora	Castile and León	Manuel Camba
Calvo Basket Xiria	Carballo	Galicia	Vila de Noia
Cantbasket 04	Santander	Cantabria	Palacio de Deportes
CB Costa Ártabra	Ferrol	Galicia	Javier Gómez Noya
CB La Flecha	Arroyo de la Encomienda	Castile and León	La Vega
CB Santurtzi SK	Santurtzi	Basque Country	Mikel Trueba
CB Solares	Medio Cudeyo	Cantabria	Mies del Corro
CB Valle de Egüés	Valle de Egüés	Navarre	Maristas
Conspur Bezana	Santa Cruz de Bezana	Cantabria	Soto de la Marina
Easo Bodegas Muga	San Sebastián	Basque Country	José Antonio Gasca
Estudiantes Lugo Leyma Natura	Lugo	Galicia	Pazo dos Deportes
Gijón Basket	Gijón	Asturias	Palacio de Deportes
Goierri Iparragirre 2020	Urretxu	Basque Country	Aldiri
Grupo Inmapa Filipenses	Palencia	Castile and León	Municipal
KFC Culleredo	Culleredo	Galicia	O Burgo
LBC Cocinas.com	Logroño	La Rioja	Espartero
Megacalzado Ardoi	Zizur Mayor-Zizur Nagusia	Navarre	Municipal
Mondragón Unibersitatea	Mondragón	Basque Country	Iturripe
Nissan Grupo de Santiago	Burgos	Castile and León	El Plantío
Obradoiro Silleda B	Silleda	Galicia	César González Fares
Porriño Baloncesto Base	O Porriño	Galicia	Porriño 1
Raisan Pas Piélagos	Piélagos	Cantabria	El Moli
Santo Domingo Betanzos	Betanzos	Galicia	Municipal
Tabirako Baqué	Durango	Basque Country	Landako
Ucoga Seguros CB Chantada Ensino	Chantada	Galicia	Municipal
UEMC Real Valladolid Baloncesto B	Valladolid	Castile and León	Pisuerga
Ulacia Zarautz	Zarautz	Basque Country	Aritzbatalde
ULE RBH Global Basket León	León	Castile and León	Palacio de los Deportes
Universidad de Valladolid	Valladolid	Castile and León	Fuente de La Mora
USAL La Antigua	Salamanca	Castile and León	Würzburg

=== Regular season ===
==== Group A–A ====
Pos	Team	Pld	W	L	PF	PA	PD	Pts	Qualification or relegation
1	Mondragón Unibersitatea	20	16	4	1543	1415	+128	36	Qualification to promotion playoffs
2	CB Valle de Egüés	20	13	7	1397	1346	+51	33	
3	CB Santurtzi SK	20	12	8	1440	1283	+157	32	
4	LBC Cocinas.com	20	12	8	1437	1386	+51	32	
5	Easo Bodegas Muga	20	11	9	1326	1339	−13	31	
6	Ulacia Zarautz	20	11	9	1307	1235	+72	31	
7	Megacalzado Ardoi	20	10	10	1307	1302	+5	30	
8	CB Solares	20	10	10	1557	1541	+16	30	
9	Baskonia B	20	8	12	1469	1520	−51	28	
10	Tabirako Baqué	20	7	13	1258	1255	+3	27	Relegation to Primera División
11	Goierri Iparragirre 2020	20	0	20	1172	1591	−419	20	Relegation to Primera División

Source: FEB

==== Group A–B ====
Pos	Team	Pld	W	L	PF	PA	PD	Pts	Qualification or relegation
1	USAL La Antigua	20	18	2	1584	1383	+201	38	Qualification to promotion playoffs
2	Nissan Grupo de Santiago	20	14	6	1629	1488	+141	34	
3	Cantbasket 04	20	12	8	1464	1423	+41	32	
4	Raisan Pas Piélagos	20	11	9	1665	1584	+81	31	
5	Conspur Bezana (Note: Conspur Bezana was deducted one point.)	20	12	8	1407	1321	+86	31	
6	Universidad de Valladolid	20	10	10	1411	1465	−54	30	
7	Ávila Auténtica "El Bulevar"	20	10	10	1357	1271	+86	30	
8	CB La Flecha	20	9	11	1458	1477	−19	29	
9	Grupo Inmapa Filipenses	20	7	13	1493	1559	−66	27	Relegation to Primera División
10	Caja Rural de Zamora	20	4	16	1216	1488	−272	24	Relegation to Primera División
11	UEMC Real Valladolid Baloncesto B	20	3	17	1302	1527	−225	23	Relegation to Primera División

Source: FEB

==== Group A–C ====
Pos	Team	Pld	W	L	PF	PA	PD	Pts	Qualification or relegation
1	Ucoga Seguros CB Chantada Ensino	20	15	5	1449	1229	+220	35	Qualification to promotion playoffs
2	Obradoiro Silleda B	20	15	5	1652	1537	+115	35	
3	ULE RBH Global Basket León	20	13	7	1598	1455	+143	33	
4	Porriño Baloncesto Base	20	13	7	1469	1344	+125	33	
5	Gijón Basket	20	12	8	1489	1482	+7	32	
6	Agustinos Leclerc	20	11	9	1403	1351	+52	31	
7	Santo Domingo Betanzos	20	8	12	1398	1466	−68	28	
8	KFC Culleredo	20	7	13	1367	1426	−59	27	
9	Calvo Basket Xiria	20	7	13	1494	1579	−85	27	Relegation to Primera División
10	Estudiantes Lugo Leyma Natura	20	6	14	1300	1450	−150	26	Relegation to Primera División
11	CB Costa Ártabra	20	3	17	1238	1538	−300	23	Relegation to Primera División

Source: FEB

== Conference B ==
The Conference B consisted of 17 teams in 2 groups from Canary Islands, Castilla–La Mancha and Community of Madrid.

=== Teams ===
Team	Home city	Autonomous federation	Arena
Aloe Plus Lanzarote Conejeros	Arrecife	Canary Islands	Ciudad Deportiva
Autocares Rodríguez Daimiel	Daimiel	Castilla–La Mancha	Municipal
Baloncesto Alcalá	Alcalá de Henares	Community of Madrid	Espartales
CB Agüimes	Agüimes	Canary Islands	Municipal
CB Fuenlabrada B	Fuenlabrada	Community of Madrid	El Arroyo
CB La Matanza CBA	La Matanza de Acentejo	Canary Islands	Municipal
CB Pozuelo	Pozuelo de Alarcón	Community of Madrid	El Torreón
Distrito Olímpico	Madrid	Community of Madrid	San Blas
Estudio	Madrid	Community of Madrid	Paco Hernández
Globalcaja Quintanar	Quintanar del Rey	Castilla–La Mancha	Ángel Lancho
Lujisa Guadalajara Basket	Guadalajara	Castilla–La Mancha	San José
MGS Seguros ADC Boadilla	Boadilla del Monte	Community of Madrid	Rey Felipe VI
Movistar Estudiantes B	Madrid	Community of Madrid	Antonio Magariños
Náutico Tenerife	Santa Cruz de Tenerife	Canary Islands	RCNT
Real Madrid B	Madrid	Community of Madrid	Ciudad Real Madrid
Tobarra CB	Tobarra	Castilla–La Mancha	La Granja
Uros de Rivas	Rivas-Vaciamadrid	Community of Madrid	Cerro del Telégrafo

=== First phase ===
==== Group B–A ====
Pos	Team	Pld	W	L	PF	PA	PD	Pts	Qualification
1	CB Fuenlabrada B	16	13	3	1241	1077	+164	29	Qualification to promotion group
2	Uros de Rivas	16	13	3	1185	1114	+71	29	Qualification to promotion group
3	Globalcaja Quintanar	16	10	6	1132	1068	+64	26	Qualification to promotion group
4	Estudio	16	9	7	1320	1229	+91	25	Qualification to promotion group
5	Movistar Estudiantes B	16	8	8	1219	1151	+68	24	Qualification to promotion group
6	Distrito Olímpico	16	7	9	1152	1171	−19	23	Qualification to relegation group
7	CB Agüimes	16	5	11	1018	1144	−126	21	Qualification to relegation group
8	Autocares Rodríguez Daimiel	16	5	11	1084	1204	−120	21	Qualification to relegation group
9	Aloe Plus Lanzarote Conejeros	16	2	14	1026	1219	−193	18	Qualification to relegation group

Source: FEB

==== Group B–B ====
Pos	Team	Pld	W	L	PF	PA	PD	Pts	Qualification
1	Real Madrid B	14	13	1	1249	991	+258	27	Qualification to promotion group
2	Baloncesto Alcalá	14	10	4	1160	1073	+87	24	Qualification to promotion group
3	CB La Matanza CBA	14	9	5	1079	1085	−6	23	Qualification to promotion group
4	Náutico Tenerife	14	8	6	1030	962	+68	22	Qualification to promotion group
5	MGS Seguros ADC Boadilla	14	6	8	993	1134	−141	20	Qualification to relegation group
6	Lujisa Guadalajara Basket	14	5	9	1075	1101	−26	19	Qualification to relegation group
7	CB Pozuelo	14	5	9	1020	1045	−25	19	Qualification to relegation group
8	Tobarra CB	14	0	14	965	1180	−215	14	Qualification to relegation group

Source: FEB

=== Second phase ===
==== Group B–Promotion–1 ====
Pos	Team	Pld	W	L	PF	PA	PD	Pts	Qualification
1	CB Fuenlabrada B	4	4	0	345	298	+47	8	Qualification to promotion playoffs
2	Estudio	4	2	2	338	357	−19	6	
3	CB La Matanza CBA	4	0	4	322	350	−28	4	

Source: FEB

==== Group B–Promotion–2 ====
Pos	Team	Pld	W	L	PF	PA	PD	Pts	Qualification
1	Real Madrid B (Note: Real Madrid B resigned to play the promotion playoffs as it was scheduled to be played during the same dates as the final tournament of the Next Generation Tournament.)	4	3	1	285	249	+36	7	
2	Globalcaja Quintanar	4	2	2	269	287	−18	6	Qualification to promotion playoffs
3	Náutico Tenerife	4	1	3	285	303	−18	5	

Source: FEB

==== Group B–Promotion–3 ====
Pos	Team	Pld	W	L	PF	PA	PD	Pts	Qualification
1	Movistar Estudiantes B	4	2	2	303	288	+15	6	Qualification to promotion playoffs
2	Uros de Rivas	4	2	2	287	290	−3	6	Qualification to promotion playoffs
3	Baloncesto Alcalá	4	2	2	310	322	−12	6	

Source: FEB

==== Group B–Relegation ====
Pos	Team	Pld	W	L	PF	PA	PD	Pts	Relegation
1	Lujisa Guadalajara Basket	14	11	3	1102	1004	+98	25	
2	CB Pozuelo	14	9	5	1015	993	+22	23	
3	Distrito Olímpico	14	9	5	1064	993	+71	23	Relegation to Primera División
4	Autocares Rodríguez Daimiel	14	9	5	1056	1018	+38	23	Relegation to Primera División
5	MGS Seguros ADC Boadilla	14	8	6	1117	1061	+56	22	Relegation to Primera División
6	CB Agüimes	14	5	9	974	1017	−43	19	Relegation to Primera División
7	Aloe Plus Lanzarote Conejeros	14	4	10	959	1041	−82	18	Relegation to Primera División
8	Tobarra CB	14	1	13	979	1139	−160	15	Relegation to Primera División

Source: FEB

== Conference C ==
The Conference C consisted of 5 groups of 7 teams from Aragon, Catalonia and Balearic Islands.

=== Teams ===
Team	Home city	Autonomous federation	Arena
AD Torreforta	Tarragona	Catalonia	Riu Clar
AE Badalonès	Badalona	Catalonia	La Plana
AEA Solidaria Llucmajor	Llucmajor	Balearic Islands	Municipal
Anagan Olivar	Zaragoza	Aragon	Miralbueno
Azulejos Moncayo CBZ	Zaragoza	Aragon	Múdejar
Baricentro Barberà	Barberà del Vallès	Catalonia	Can Serra
BBA Castelldefels	Castelldefels	Catalonia	Can Vinader
Belsué Seguros El Olivar	Zaragoza	Aragon	El Olivar
Brisasol CB Salou	Salou	Catalonia	Centre Salou
CB Granollers 1-Pisos.com	Granollers	Catalonia	CB Granollers
CB Martorell	Martorell	Catalonia	Municipal
CB Quart Germans Cruz	Quart	Catalonia	Municipal
CB Valls Òptiques Teixidó	Valls	Catalonia	Joana Ballart
CB Vic Universitat de Vic	Vic	Catalonia	Castell d'en Planes
Cochesinternet.net Alpicat	Alpicat	Catalonia	Antoni Roure Vila
Consell Air Europa B	Palma de Mallorca	Balearic Islands	Cati Pol
DM Group Mollet	Mollet del Vallès	Catalonia	Plana Lledó
FC Martinenc Bàsquet	Barcelona	Catalonia	Guinardó
Grup Via CB Artés	Artés	Catalonia	Municipal
JAC Sants Barcelona	Barcelona	Catalonia	Espanya Industrial
Joventut Badalona B	Badalona	Catalonia	Municipal
Maristes Ademar	Badalona	Catalonia	La Plana
Mataró Parc Maresme	Mataró	Catalonia	Eusebi Millán
MCNTeam SESE	Barcelona	Catalonia	Ramon Aldufreu Virrei Amat
Monbus CB Igualada	Igualada	Catalonia	Les Comes
OBC Alfindén	La Puebla de Alfindén	Aragon	Municipal
Patria Hispana Seguros Almozara	Zaragoza	Aragon	CDM Siglo XXI
Pinta B CB Es Castell	Es Castell	Balearic Islands	Sergio Llull
Plus Ultra Seguros Roser	Barcelona	Catalonia	Mundet
Ripotrans Lliçà d'Amunt	Lliçà d'Amunt	Catalonia	Pavelló d'Esports
Sant Antoni Ibiza Feeling	Sant Antoni de Portmany	Balearic Islands	Sa Pedrera
Sol Gironès Bisbal Bàsquet	La Bisbal d'Empordà	Catalonia	Municipal
Tenea CB Esparreguera	Esparreguera	Catalonia	Ramon Martí
UE Mataró Germans Homs	Mataró	Catalonia	Josep Mora
UE Sant Cugat	Sant Cugat del Vallès	Catalonia	Municipal

=== Regular season ===
==== Group C–1 ====
Pos	Team	Pld	W	L	PF	PA	PD	Pts	Qualification or relegation
1	CB Valls Òptiques Teixidó	12	10	2	938	791	+147	22	Qualification to qualification playoffs
2	BBA Castelldefels	12	9	3	897	801	+96	21	Qualification to qualification playoffs
3	Monbus CB Igualada	12	7	5	946	798	+148	19	
4	Cochesinternet.net Alpicat	12	6	6	810	815	−5	18	
5	Grup Via CB Artés	12	6	6	846	876	−30	18	
6	Anagán Olivar	12	4	8	788	928	−140	16	
7	AD Torreforta	12	0	12	747	963	−216	12	Relegation to Primera División

Source: FEB

==== Group C–2 ====
Pos	Team	Pld	W	L	PF	PA	PD	Pts	Qualification or relegation
1	CB Martorell	12	9	3	881	781	+100	21	Qualification to qualification playoffs
2	Brisasol CB Salou	12	8	4	910	849	+61	20	Qualification to qualification playoffs
3	MCNTeam SESE	12	7	5	921	848	+73	19	
4	Pinta B CB Es Castell	12	7	5	877	879	−2	19	
5	Tenea CB Esparreguera	12	7	5	863	858	+5	19	
6	UE Sant Cugat	12	2	10	772	880	−108	14	
7	Belsué Seguros El Olivar	12	2	10	843	972	−129	14	Relegation to Primera División

Source: FEB

==== Group C–3 ====
Pos	Team	Pld	W	L	PF	PA	PD	Pts	Qualification or relegation
1	AEA Solidaria Llucmajor	12	10	2	987	905	+82	22	Qualification to qualification playoffs
2	CB Vic Universitat de Vic	12	7	5	941	836	+105	19	
3	Plus Ultra Seguros Roser	12	7	5	874	893	−19	19	
4	FC Martinenc Bàsquet	12	7	5	933	869	+64	19	
5	OBC Alfindén	12	5	7	875	914	−39	17	
6	Baricentro Barberà	12	4	8	857	927	−70	16	
7	JAC Sants Barcelona	12	2	10	778	901	−123	14	Relegation to Primera División

Source: FEB

==== Group C–4 ====
Pos	Team	Pld	W	L	PF	PA	PD	Pts	Qualification or relegation
1	DM Group Mollet	12	12	0	903	690	+213	24	Qualification to qualification playoffs
2	UE Mataró Germans Homs	12	9	3	920	807	+113	21	Qualification to qualification playoffs
3	CB Quart Germans Cruz	12	8	4	849	762	+87	20	
4	Ripotrans Lliçà d'Amunt (Note: Ripotrans Lliçà d'Amunt resigned.)	12	5	7	772	851	−79	17	Relegation to Primera División
5	Consell Air Europa B	12	3	9	839	886	−47	15	
6	Patria Hispana Seguros Almozara	12	3	9	736	884	−148	15	
7	CB Granollers 1-Pisos.com	12	2	10	714	853	−139	14	Relegation to Primera División

Source: FEB

==== Group C–5 ====
Pos	Team	Pld	W	L	PF	PA	PD	Pts	Qualification or relegation
1	Sant Antoni Ibiza Feeling	12	11	1	915	741	+174	23	Qualification to qualification playoffs
2	Joventut Badalona B	12	7	5	876	819	+57	19	
3	Sol Gironès Bisbal Bàsquet	12	6	6	850	849	+1	18	
4	AE Badalonès	12	6	6	848	881	−33	18	
5	Azulejos Moncayo CBZ	12	5	7	772	837	−65	17	
6	Maristes Ademar	12	4	8	762	835	−73	16	
7	Mataró Parc Maresme	12	3	9	748	809	−61	15	

Source: FEB

=== Qualification playoffs ===
Team 1	Score	Team 2
DM Group Mollet	73–70	Brisasol CB Salou
Sant Antoni Ibiza Feeling	95–67	BBA Castelldefels
CB Valls Òptiques Teixidó	66–78	UE Mataró Germans Homs
AEA Solidaria Llucmajor	89–84	CB Martorell

== Conference D ==
The Conference D consisted of 2 groups of 11 teams from Andalusia, Extremadura, Ceuta and Melilla.

=== Teams ===
Team	Home city	Autonomous federation	Arena
Benahavís Costa del Sol	Benahavís	Andalusia	Municipal
Bodegón Andalucía CB Cimis	San Fernando	Andalusia	Almirante Laulhé
CAB Estepona	Estepona	Andalusia	Pineda
CB La Zubia	La Zubia	Andalusia	11 de marzo
CB Novaschool	Rincón de la Victoria	Andalusia	Novaschool Añoreta
CBSFDO	San Fernando	Andalusia	El Parque
Ciudad de Huelva	Huelva	Andalusia	Andrés Estrada
Climanavas Agrometal Peñarroya	Peñarroya	Andalusia	Lourdes Mohedano
Colegio El Pinar	Alhaurín de la Torre	Andalusia	El Pinar
Ecoculture Costa de Almería	Almería	Andalusia	Moisés Ruiz
Gymnástica Portuense	El Puerto de Santa María	Andalusia	Ramón Velázquez
Huelva Comercio	Huelva	Andalusia	Andrés Estrada
Jaén Paraíso Interior CB Andújar	Andújar	Andalusia	Municipal
Jaén Paraíso Interior Montetucci CB Martos	Martos	Andalusia	Municipal de la Juventud
Melilla Sport Capital Enrique Soler B	Melilla	Melilla	Guillermo García Pezzi
Oh!Tels ULB	La Línea de la Concepción	Andalusia	Municipal
Real Betis Baloncesto B	Seville	Andalusia	Juan Ramón López García
Rus CB Ciudad de Dos Hermanas	Dos Hermanas	Andalusia	Los Montecillos
Sagrado Corazón Lithium Iberia	Cáceres	Extremadura	Ciudad de Cáceres
Torta del Casar Extremadura B	Cáceres	Extremadura	Ciudad de Cáceres
Unicaja Andalucía B	Málaga	Andalusia	Los Guindos
Xerez Club Deportivo	Jerez de la Frontera	Andalusia	José María Ruiz Mateos

=== Regular season ===
==== Group D–A ====
Pos	Team	Pld	W	L	PF	PA	PD	Pts	Qualification or relegation
1	Jaén Paraíso Interior CB Andújar	20	13	7	1490	1417	+73	33	Qualification to qualification playoffs
2	CB La Zubia	20	13	7	1493	1390	+103	33	Qualification to qualification playoffs
3	Benahavís Costa del Sol	20	13	7	1486	1448	+38	33	
4	Ecoculture Costa de Almería	20	13	7	1430	1333	+97	33	
5	CB Novaschool	20	12	8	1518	1478	+40	32	
6	Colegio El Pinar	20	11	9	1535	1463	+72	31	
7	Unicaja Andalucía B	20	10	10	1436	1389	+47	30	
8	Jaén Paraíso Interior Montetucci CB Martos (Note: Jaén Paraíso Interior Montetucci CB Martos resigned.)	20	8	12	1517	1593	−76	28	Relegation to Primera División
9	CAB Estepona	20	7	13	1500	1584	−84	27	
10	Melilla Sport Capital Enrique Soler B	20	7	13	1465	1595	−130	27	
11	Oh!Tels ULB	20	3	17	1351	1531	−180	23	

Source: FEB

==== Group D–B ====
Pos	Team	Pld	W	L	PF	PA	PD	Pts	Qualification or relegation
1	Huelva Comercio	20	17	3	1733	1365	+368	37	Qualification to qualification playoffs
2	Ciudad de Huelva	20	17	3	1557	1298	+259	37	Qualification to qualification playoffs
3	Sagrado Corazón Lithium Iberia	20	16	4	1654	1487	+167	36	
4	Bodegón Andalucía CB Cimbis	20	15	5	1552	1354	+198	35	
5	Climanavas Agrometal Peñarroya	20	12	8	1458	1400	+58	32	
6	Rus CB Ciudad de Dos Hermanas	20	11	9	1440	1412	+28	31	
7	CBSFDO	20	7	13	1334	1500	−166	27	
8	Torta del Casar Extremadura B	20	6	14	1304	1433	−129	26	
9	Real Betis Baloncesto B	20	5	15	1312	1413	−101	25	
10	Gymnástica Portuense	20	3	17	1417	1680	−263	23	
11	Xerez Club Deportivo	20	1	19	1204	1623	−419	21	

Source: FEB

=== Qualification playoffs ===
Team 1	Agg.	Team 2	1st leg	2nd leg
CB La Zubia	162–154	Huelva Comercio	75–80	87–74
Ciudad de Huelva	154–145	Jaén Paraíso Interior CB Andújar	73–70	81–75

== Conference E ==
The Conference E consisted of 2 groups of 10 teams from Valencian Community and Murcia.

=== Teams ===
Team	Home city	Autonomous federation	Arena
Àngels Visión Units Pel Bàsquet Gandia	Gandia	Valencian Community	Municipal
Bauhaus Godella	Godella	Valencian Community	Municipal
CB Ifach Calpe	Calp	Valencian Community	Municipal
CB Puerto Sagunto	Sagunto	Valencian Community	José Veral
CB Tabernes Blanques Fernando Gil	Tavernes Blanques	Valencian Community	Municipal
Conciencia2s Valencia CB Aldaia	Aldaia	Valencian Community	Municipal
ESET Ontinet	Ontinyent	Valencian Community	Municipal
FC Cartagena CB	Cartagena	Murcia	Palacio de Deportes
Inalco Alcora Caixa Rural	L'Alcora	Valencian Community	Municipal
Innovaciones Constructivas Quesada NBTorrent	Torrent	Valencian Community	El Vedat
La Nucia UA Fundación Lucentum B	La Nucia	Valencian Community	Camilo Cano
Nou Bàsquet Paterna	Paterna	Valencian Community	Municipal
Picken Claret	Valencia	Valencian Community	Benimaclet
Refitel Bàsquet Llíria	Llíria	Valencian Community	Pla del Arc
Safir Fruits Alginet	Alginet	Valencian Community	Municipal
SCD Carolinas	Alicante	Valencian Community	Florida Babel
Servigroup Benidorm	Benidorm	Valencian Community	Illa Benidorm
TAU Castelló B	Castellón de la Plana	Valencian Community	Ciutat de Castelló
UCAM Murcia CB B	Murcia	Murcia	Palacio de Deportes
Valencia Basket B	Valencia	Valencian Community	L'Alquería

=== First phase ===
==== Group E–A ====
Pos	Team	Pld	W	L	PF	PA	PD	Pts	Qualification
1	Valencia Basket B	18	17	1	1567	1124	+443	35	Qualification to promotion group
2	Refitel Bàsquet Llíria	18	16	2	1411	1109	+302	34	Qualification to promotion group
3	Nou Bàsquet Paterna	18	13	5	1472	1263	+209	31	Qualification to promotion group
4	CB Puerto Sagunto	18	9	9	1294	1338	−44	27	Qualification to promotion group
5	Bauhaus Godella	18	8	10	1317	1412	−95	26	Qualification to promotion group
6	Picken Claret	18	8	10	1205	1334	−129	26	Qualification to relegation group
7	TAU Castelló B	18	7	11	1305	1357	−52	25	Qualification to relegation group
8	Conciencia2s Valencia CB Aldaia	18	6	12	1182	1372	−190	24	Qualification to relegation group
9	Innovaciones Constructivas Quesada NBTorrent	18	5	13	1378	1538	−160	23	Qualification to relegation group
10	Inalco Alcora Caixa Rural	18	1	17	1227	1511	−284	19	Qualification to relegation group

Source: FEB

==== Group E–B ====
Pos	Team	Pld	W	L	PF	PA	PD	Pts	Qualification
1	Safir Fruits Alginet	18	15	3	1380	1172	+208	33	Qualification to promotion group
2	FC Cartagena CB	18	13	5	1230	1145	+85	31	Qualification to promotion group
3	La Nucia UA Fundación Lucentum B	18	11	7	1293	1177	+116	29	Qualification to promotion group
4	Servigroup Benidorm	18	11	7	1332	1301	+31	29	Qualification to promotion group
5	CB Ifach Calpe	18	10	8	1260	1259	+1	28	Qualification to promotion group
6	CB Tabernes Blanques Fernando Gil	18	9	9	1292	1301	−9	27	Qualification to relegation group
7	UCAM Murcia CB B	18	8	10	1266	1236	+30	26	Qualification to relegation group
8	Àngels Visión Units Pel Bàsquet Gandia	18	8	10	1201	1206	−5	26	Qualification to relegation group
9	SCD Carolinas	18	3	15	1117	1322	−205	21	Qualification to relegation group
10	ESET Ontinet	18	2	16	1130	1382	−252	20	Qualification to relegation group

Source: FEB

=== Second phase ===
==== Promotion group ====
Pos	Team	Pld	W	L	PF	PA	PD	Pts	Qualification
1	Valencia Basket B	18	17	1	1537	1164	+373	35	Qualification to promotion playoffs
2	FC Cartagena CB	18	13	5	1303	1209	+94	31	Qualification to promotion playoffs
3	Safir Fruits Alginet	18	13	5	1411	1276	+135	31	Qualification to promotion playoffs
4	Refitel Bàsquet Llíria	18	13	5	1371	1262	+109	31	
5	La Nucia UA Fundación Lucentum B	18	9	9	1309	1310	−1	27	
6	Nou Basquet Paterna	18	7	11	1391	1352	+39	25	
7	CB Puerto Sagunto	18	6	12	1165	1293	−128	24	
8	Servigroup Benidorm	18	6	12	1265	1397	−132	24	
9	CB Ifach Calpe	18	4	14	1115	1356	−241	22	
10	Bauhaus Godella	18	2	16	1192	1440	−248	20	

Source: FEB

==== Relegation group ====
Pos	Team	Pld	W	L	PF	PA	PD	Pts	Relegation
1	CB Tabernes Blanques Fernando Gil	18	14	4	1368	1279	+89	32	
2	UCAM Murcia CB B	18	13	5	1517	1335	+182	31	
3	Àngels Visión Units Pel Bàsquet Gandia	18	13	5	1321	1233	+88	31	
4	TAU Castelló B	18	11	7	1372	1383	−11	29	
5	Picken Claret	18	9	9	1249	1236	+13	27	
6	Innovaciones Constructivas Quesada NBTorrent	18	8	10	1419	1458	−39	26	
7	Conciencia2s Valencia CB Aldaia	18	8	10	1280	1301	−21	26	
8	SCD Carolinas	18	5	13	1138	1230	−92	23	
9	Inalco Alcora Caixa Rural	18	5	13	1365	1453	−88	23	
10	ESET Ontinet	18	4	14	1280	1401	−121	22	Relegation to Primera División

Source: FEB

== Promotion playoffs ==
The two best teams of each conference; the third of Conferences A, B, C and E; and the fourth of Conferences B and C played the promotion playoffs. From these 16 teams, only five were promoted to LEB Plata. Each promotion playoff consisted in two groups of four teams where the subgroup winners promoted directly to LEB Plata. The two runners-up from each subgroup played a final match for the last spot.

=== Group A – Salou ===
==== Subgroup A1 ====
Pos	Grp	Team	Pld	W	L	PF	PA	PD	Pts	Promotion or qualification
1	B1	CB Fuenlabrada B	3	3	0	236	188	+48	6	Promotion to LEB Plata
2	C2	Sant Antoni Ibiza Feeling	3	2	1	238	209	+29	5	Qualification to repechage
3	A3	Ucoga Seguros CB Chantada Ensino	3	1	2	190	239	−49	4	
4	C4	UE Mataró Germans Homs	3	0	3	205	233	−28	3	

Source: FEB

13 May 2021	Ucoga Seguros CB Chantada Ensino	60–84	CB Fuenlabrada B
16:30
		Boxscore

13 May 2021	UE Mataró Germans Homs	76–84	Sant Antoni Ibiza Feeling
19:00
		Boxscore

14 May 2021	Sant Antoni Ibiza Feeling	88–62	Ucoga Seguros CB Chantada Ensino
16:30
		Boxscore

14 May 2021	UE Mataró Germans Homs	62–81	CB Fuenlabrada B
19:00
		Boxscore

15 May 2021	CB Fuenlabrada B	71–66	Sant Antoni Ibiza Feeling
16:30
		Boxscore

15 May 2021	Ucoga Seguros CB Chantada Ensino	68–67	UE Mataró Germans Homs
19:00
		Boxscore

==== Subgroup A2 ====
Pos	Grp	Team	Pld	W	L	PF	PA	PD	Pts	Promotion or qualification
1	E3	Safir Fruits Alginet	3	3	0	242	199	+43	6	Promotion to LEB Plata
2	C1	DM Group Mollet	3	2	1	223	217	+6	5	Qualification to repechage
3	B4	Globalcaja Quintanar	3	1	2	201	211	−10	4	
4	A2	Mondragón Unibersitatea	3	0	3	210	249	−39	3	

Source: FEB

13 May 2021	Globalcaja Quintanar	72–58	Mondragón Unibersitatea
10:30
		Boxscore

13 May 2021	Safir Fruits Alginet	77–58	DM Group Mollet
13:00
		Boxscore

14 May 2021	Mondragón Unibersitatea	80–101	Safir Fruits Alginet
10:30
		Boxscore

14 May 2021	Globalcaja Quintanar	68–89	DM Group Mollet
13:00
		Boxscore

15 May 2021	Safir Fruits Alginet	64–61	Globalcaja Quintanar
10:30
		Boxscore

15 May 2021	DM Group Mollet	76–72	Mondragón Unibersitatea
13:00
		Boxscore

==== Repechage ====
16 May 2021	Sant Antoni Ibiza Feeling	91–96	DM Group Mollet
11:30
		Boxscore

=== Group B – Valencia ===
==== Subgroup B3 ====
Pos	Grp	Team	Pld	W	L	PF	PA	PD	Pts	Promotion or qualification
1	E2	FC Cartagena CB	3	3	0	218	178	+40	6	Promotion to LEB Plata
2	B2	Movistar Estudiantes B	3	2	1	250	224	+26	5	Qualification to repechage
3	C3	AEA Solidaria Llucmajor	3	1	2	233	246	−13	4	
4	D1	Ciudad de Huelva	3	0	3	194	247	−53	3	

Source: FEB

13 May 2021	FC Cartagena CB	75–57	Ciudad de Huelva
10:00
		Boxscore

13 May 2021	AEA Solidaria Llucmajor	86–104	Movistar Estudiantes B
13:00
		Boxscore

14 May 2021	Movistar Estudiantes B	56–72	FC Cartagena CB
10:00
		Boxscore

14 May 2021	AEA Solidaria Llucmajor	82–71	Ciudad de Huelva
12:30
		Boxscore

15 May 2021	Ciudad de Huelva	66–90	Movistar Estudiantes B
10:00
		Boxscore

15 May 2021	FC Cartagena CB	71–65	AEA Solidaria Llucmajor
12:30
		Boxscore

==== Subgroup B4 ====
Pos	Grp	Team	Pld	W	L	PF	PA	PD	Pts	Promotion or qualification
1	E1	Valencia Basket B	3	3	0	277	235	+42	6	Promotion to LEB Plata
2	B3	Uros de Rivas	3	2	1	224	208	+16	5	Qualification to repechage
3	D2	CB La Zubia	3	1	2	207	230	−23	4	
4	A1	USAL La Antigua	3	0	3	215	250	−35	3	

Source: FEB

13 May 2021	CB La Zubia	74–97	Valencia Basket B
17:30
		Boxscore

13 May 2021	Uros de Rivas	80–65	USAL La Antigua
20:00
		Boxscore

14 May 2021	USAL La Antigua	61–79	CB La Zubia
17:30
		Boxscore

14 May 2021	Uros de Rivas	72–89	Valencia Basket B
20:00
		Boxscore

15 May 2021	CB La Zubia	54–72	Uros de Rivas
17:30
		Boxscore

15 May 2021	Valencia Basket B	91–89	USAL La Antigua
20:00
		Boxscore

==== Repechage ====
16 May 2021	Movistar Estudiantes B	87–81	Uros de Rivas
11:30
		Boxscore

=== Final standings ===
Pos	Grp	Team	Pld	W	L	PF	PA	PD	Promotion
1	B1	CB Fuenlabrada B (Note: CB Fuenlabrada B resigned to promote.)	3	3	0	236	188	+48	
2	E3	Safir Fruits Alginet	3	3	0	242	199	+43	Promotion to LEB Plata
3	E1	Valencia Basket B	3	3	0	277	235	+42	Promotion to LEB Plata
4	E2	FC Cartagena CB	3	3	0	218	178	+40	Promotion to LEB Plata
5	B2	Movistar Estudiantes B (Note: Movistar Estudiantes B resigned to promote.)	4	3	1	337	305	+32	
6	C1	DM Group Mollet	4	3	1	319	308	+11	Promotion to LEB Plata
7	C2	Sant Antoni Ibiza Feeling	4	2	2	329	305	+24	Promotion to LEB Plata
8	B3	Uros de Rivas	4	2	2	305	295	+10	
9	B4	Globalcaja Quintanar	3	1	2	201	211	−10	
10	C3	AEA Solidaria Llucmajor	3	1	2	233	246	−13	
11	D2	CB La Zubia	3	1	2	207	230	−23	
12	A3	Ucoga Seguros CB Chantada Ensino	3	1	2	190	239	−49	
13	C4	UE Mataró Germans Homs	3	0	3	205	233	−28	
14	A1	USAL La Antigua	3	0	3	215	250	−35	
15	A2	Mondragón Unibersitatea	3	0	3	210	249	−39	
16	D1	Ciudad de Huelva	3	0	3	194	247	−53	

Source: FEB
