= 2018–19 LEB Plata season =

LEB Plata
- Season: 2018–19
- Games played: 412
- Teams: 24

Regular season
- Season MVP: Jordi Trias
- Promoted: HLA Alicante; Afanion CB Almansa; Marín Ence PeixeGalego
- Relegated: TeslaCard Círculo Gijón; CB Extremadura Plasencia; Ávila Auténtica Carrefour; CB Vic Universitat de Vic; JAFEP Globalcaja La Roda; Quesería La Antigua CB Tormes

Finals
- Champions: HLA Alicante (1st title)

Awards
- Best Coach: Pedro Rivero

Records
- Biggest home win: Ávila 86–44 Albacete (27 April 2019)
- Biggest away win: Estela 52–91 Marín (4 January 2019)
- Highest scoring: Zornotza 98–95 Baskonia (2 February 2019)
- Winning streak: 15 games HLA Alicante
- Losing streak: 7 games Aceitunas Fragata Morón; Torrons Vicens L'Hospitalet

The 2018–19 LEB Plata season was the 19th season of the Spanish basketball third league. It started on 6 October 2018 with the first round of the regular season and ended on 25 May 2019 with the promotion playoffs.

== Format changes ==
On 2 June 2018, the General Assembly of the Spanish Basketball Federation agreed some changes in the competition format:

- The competition will be expanded to 24 teams, divided into two groups of twelve by economical and geographical criteria. The top six teams of each group will join the group A1 for the promotion and the bottom six, the group A2 for avoiding relegation.
- Three teams will be promoted to LEB Oro (the winner of the group A1 and the two playoffs winners) and six relegated to Liga EBA.
- Four teams will join the playoffs for two more spots, decided by two-legged series.

== Teams ==
=== Promotion and relegation (pre-season) ===
A total of 24 teams contested the league, including 10 sides from the 2017–18 season, two relegated from the 2017–18 LEB Oro, four promoted from the 2017–18 Liga EBA and eight guest teams according to the FEB criteria. On July 11, 2018, Isover Basket Azuqueca, CB Vic Universitat de Vic, Bàsquet Girona, Aquimisa Laboratorios Queso Zamorano, Igualitorio Cantabria Estela, Quesería La Antigua CB Tormes, TeslaCard Círculo Gijón and Zornotza Saskibaloi Taldea achieved the vacancies from the expansion to 24 teams.

Teams relegated from LEB Oro

- Juaristi ISB
- CB Clavijo

Teams promoted from Liga EBA

- Marín Ence PeixeGalego
- Afanion CB Almansa
- Hestia Menorca
- CB Villarrobledo

Teams relegated to Liga EBA

- Xuven Cambados
- ~~Aquimisa Laboratorios Queso Zamorano~~ (remained in the league achieving a vacant berth)
- Agustinos Leclerc
- CB Martorell

Teams that applied to participate

- Bàsquet Girona
- CB Vic Universitat de Vic
- Igualitorio Cantabria Estela
- Isover Basket Azuqueca
- Quesería La Antigua CB Tormes
- TeslaCard Círculo Gijón
- Zornotza Saskibaloi Taldea

=== Venues and locations ===
Location of teams in 2018–19 LEB Plata
Red: Group East; Green: Group West.

Team	Home city	Arena	Capacity
Aceitunas Fragata Morón	Morón de la Frontera	Alameda	600
Afanion CB Almansa	Almansa	Polideportivo Municipal	
Aquimisa Laboratorios Queso Zamorano	Zamora	Ángel Nieto	2,200
Arcos Albacete Basket	Albacete	Pabellón del Parque	1,200
Ávila Auténtica Carrefour "El Bulevar"	Ávila	Carlos Sastre	1,400
Basket Navarra	Pamplona	Arrosadia	1,500
Bàsquet Girona	Girona	Fontajau	5,500
Bodegas Rioja Vega	Logroño	Palacio de los Deportes	4,500
CB Extremadura Plasencia	Plasencia	Ciudad de Plasencia	2,500
CB Vic Universitat de Vic	Vic	Castell d'en Planes	2,000
CB Villarrobledo	Villarrobledo	Los Pintores	
Grupo Eleyco Baskonia B	Vitoria-Gasteiz	Mendizorrotza	2,603
Hestia Menorca	Mahón	Pavelló Menorca	5,115
HLA Alicante	Alicante	Pedro Ferrándiz	5,700
Igualitorio Cantabria Estela	Santander	Palacio de Deportes	6,000
Isover Basket Azuqueca	Azuqueca de Henares	La Paz	
JAFEP Fundación Globalcaja La Roda	La Roda	Juan José Lozano Jareño	500
Juaristi ISB	Azpeitia	Municipal	1,000
Marín Ence PeixeGalego	Marín	A Raña	2,000
Real Murcia Baloncesto	Murcia	Príncipe de Asturias	3,500
Torrons Vicens CB L'Hospitalet	L'Hospitalet	Nou Pavelló del Centre	700
Quesería La Antigua CB Tormes	Salamanca	Würzburg	3,500
TeslaCard Círculo Gijón	Gijón	Palacio de Deportes	5,197
Zornotza Saskibaloi Taldea	Amorebieta-Etxano	Larrea	600

== First phase ==
=== Group East ===
==== League table ====
Pos	Team	Pld	W	L	PF	PA	PD	Pts	Qualification
1	HLA Alicante	22	18	4	1671	1446	+225	40	Qualification to Group A1
2	Bàsquet Girona	22	14	8	1549	1510	+39	36	Qualification to Group A1
3	Real Murcia Baloncesto	22	14	8	1650	1505	+145	36	Qualification to Group A1
4	CB Villarrobledo	22	13	9	1606	1619	−13	35	Qualification to Group A1
5	Afanion CB Almansa	22	13	9	1634	1585	+49	35	Qualification to Group A1
6	Isover Basket Azuqueca	22	11	11	1576	1598	−22	33	Qualification to Group A1
7	Arcos Albacete Basket	22	10	12	1539	1649	−110	32	Qualification to Group A2
8	Hestia Menorca	22	10	12	1536	1543	−7	32	Qualification to Group A2
9	Aceitunas Fragata Morón	22	9	13	1558	1559	−1	31	Qualification to Group A2
10	Torrons Vicens CB L'Hospitalet	22	8	14	1571	1647	−76	30	Qualification to Group A2
11	CB Vic Universitat de Vic	22	6	16	1670	1817	−147	28	Qualification to Group A2
12	JAFEP Fundación Globalcaja La Roda	22	6	16	1560	1642	−82	28	Qualification to Group A2

Source: FEB

==== Positions by round ====
The table lists the positions of teams after completion of each round. In order to preserve chronological evolvements, any postponed matches are not included in the round at which they were originally scheduled, but added to the full round they were played immediately afterwards. For example, if a match is scheduled for round 13, but then postponed and played between rounds 16 and 17, it will be added to the standings for round 16.

Team ╲ Round	1	2	3	4	5	6	7	8	9	10	11	12	13	14	15	16	17	18	19	20	21	22
HLA Alicante	8	6	4	6	4	3	3	2	1	2	1	2	2	2	2	2	1	1	1	1	1	1
Bàsquet Girona	5	2	2	3	3	5	7	7	7	7	6	6	5	5	5	5	4	4	4	3	4	2
Real Murcia Baloncesto	3	1	1	2	2	1	2	1	3	1	2	1	1	1	1	1	2	2	2	2	2	3
CB Villarrobledo	6	4	3	1	1	2	1	3	2	4	4	3	3	3	3	3	3	3	3	4	3	4
Afanion CB Almansa	4	3	6	5	6	4	6	5	5	3	3	4	4	4	4	4	5	5	5	5	5	5
Isover Basket Azuqueca	2	7	5	4	5	6	5	6	4	5	5	5	6	6	6	6	6	6	6	6	6	6
Arcos Albacete Basket	1	8	7	7	9	9	11	11	12	11	11	11	11	11	8	12	8	8	9	8	7	7
Hestia Menorca	10	11	11	11	11	10	10	8	10	8	8	8	9	9	11	7	9	9	8	9	8	8
Aceitunas Fragata Morón	11	9	9	9	7	7	4	4	6	6	7	7	8	8	10	8	7	7	7	7	9	9
Torrons Vicens L'Hospitalet	7	5	8	8	8	8	8	9	9	9	9	9	7	7	7	9	10	10	10	10	10	10
CB Vic Universitat de Vic	12	12	12	12	12	12	12	12	11	12	12	12	12	12	12	10	12	12	12	12	11	11
JAFEP Globalcaja La Roda	9	10	10	10	10	11	9	10	8	10	10	10	10	10	9	11	11	11	11	11	12	12

Qualification to Group A1
Qualification to Group A2

Source: FEB

==== Results ====
Home \ Away	MOR	ALM	ALB	GIR	VIC	VRO	MEN	ALI	AZU	ROD	MUR	HOS
Aceitunas Fragata Morón	—	74–84	78–56	83–85	71–69	55–65	66–60	81–86	63–79	65–60	67–81	80–62
Afanion CB Almansa	60–57	—	90–69	70–71	80–71	68–79	56–64	75–76	73–66	70–58	62–80	85–77
Arcos Albacete Basket	78–76	58–74	—	75–82	86–61	80–74	75–72	47–80	84–66	77–74	70–78	85–92
Bàsquet Girona	66–70	46–66	84–70	—	79–68	70–58	86–65	52–46	62–66	76–65	74–68	69–75
CB Vic Universitat de Vic	77–71	78–81	75–73	83–73	—	68–79	91–92	72–87	76–72	89–75	86–82	70–92
CB Villarrobledo	81–79	65–60	70–82	90–83	89–82	—	73–76	67–76	84–80	69–65	66–62	70–67
Hestia Menorca	72–82	75–59	58–60	62–64	89–72	80–62	—	55–69	60–67	75–71	58–72	62–52
HLA Alicante	67–63	99–89	71–36	57–61	101–80	94–75	64–60	—	80–70	77–56	79–83	79–65
Isover Basket Azuqueca	72–66	78–84	74–78	64–60	95–87	65–73	79–61	79–69	—	67–64	67–64	76–79
JAFEP Globalcaja La Roda	82–74	78–83	81–71	76–58	83–73	77–70	67–75	69–86	75–80	—	82–78	67–74
Real Murcia Baloncesto	58–69	85–77	77–61	58–71	80–64	68–64	84–80	62–64	76–55	86–69	—	83–66
Torrons Vicens L'Hospitalet	59–68	81–88	62–68	75–77	87–78	82–83	72–85	49–64	80–59	69–66	54–85	—

Source: FEB
Legend: Blue = home team win; Red = away team win.

=== Group West ===
==== League table ====
Pos	Team	Pld	W	L	PF	PA	PD	Pts	Qualification
1	Basket Navarra	22	15	7	1622	1571	+51	37	Qualification to Group A1
2	Aquimisa Laboratorios Queso Zamorano	22	14	8	1660	1579	+81	36	Qualification to Group A1
3	Zornotza Saskibaloi Taldea	22	13	9	1675	1693	−18	35	Qualification to Group A1
4	Igualitorio Cantabria Estela	22	13	9	1654	1589	+65	35	Qualification to Group A1
5	Juaristi ISB	22	13	9	1579	1490	+89	35	Qualification to Group A1
6	Marín Ence PeixeGalego	22	12	10	1613	1583	+30	34	Qualification to Group A1
7	Bodegas Rioja Vega	22	12	10	1696	1657	+39	34	Qualification to Group A2
8	CB Extremadura Plasencia	22	10	12	1637	1576	+61	32	Qualification to Group A2
9	TeslaCard Círculo Gijón	22	9	13	1640	1637	+3	31	Qualification to Group A2
10	Ávila Auténtica Carrefour "El Bulevar"	22	9	13	1563	1651	−88	31	Qualification to Group A2
11	Grupo Eleyco Baskonia B	22	7	15	1587	1696	−109	29	Qualification to Group A2
12	Quesería La Antigua CB Tormes	22	5	17	1465	1669	−204	27	Qualification to Group A2

Source: FEB

==== Positions by round ====
The table lists the positions of teams after completion of each round. In order to preserve chronological evolvements, any postponed matches are not included in the round at which they were originally scheduled, but added to the full round they were played immediately afterwards. For example, if a match is scheduled for round 13, but then postponed and played between rounds 16 and 17, it will be added to the standings for round 16.

Team ╲ Round	1	2	3	4	5	6	7	8	9	10	11	12	13	14	15	16	17	18	19	20	21	22
Basket Navarra	1	3	3	1	4	2	4	4	2	5	2	3	5	5	4	3	2	1	1	1	1	1
Aquimisa Queso Zamorano	3	6	7	4	2	1	1	2	1	1	1	1	1	2	1	2	3	4	3	4	2	2
Zornotza Saskibaloi Taldea	5	1	1	2	5	4	6	7	7	6	7	4	3	3	2	1	1	3	4	2	5	3
Igualitorio Cantabria Estela	12	12	11	9	7	6	3	1	4	3	4	2	4	1	5	5	4	2	2	3	6	4
Juaristi ISB	10	8	12	10	11	9	8	5	3	2	3	5	7	7	7	4	6	5	5	5	3	5
Marín Ence PeixeGalego	6	2	5	6	9	7	5	6	6	7	6	6	2	4	3	6	5	6	6	6	4	6
Bodegas Rioja Vega	7	7	2	3	1	3	2	3	5	4	5	7	6	6	6	7	7	7	7	7	7	7
CB Extremadura Plasencia	2	4	6	11	8	10	10	9	8	8	8	9	9	8	8	8	9	8	8	8	8	8
TeslaCard Círculo Gijón	4	10	9	12	12	12	12	12	12	10	12	12	12	12	12	11	11	11	11	10	10	9
Ávila Auténtica Carrefour	9	11	10	5	6	8	7	8	9	9	9	8	8	9	10	10	8	9	9	9	9	10
Grupo Eleyco Baskonia B	11	9	4	7	3	5	9	11	11	11	10	10	10	10	9	9	10	10	10	11	11	11
Quesería La Antigua CB Tormes	8	5	8	8	10	11	11	10	10	12	11	11	11	11	11	12	12	12	12	12	12	12

Qualification to Group A1
Qualification to Group A2

Source: FEB

==== Results ====
Home \ Away	ZAM	AVI	NAV	CLA	PLA	BKN	EST	ISB	MAR	TOR	GIJ	ZOR
Aquimisa Queso Zamorano	—	63–66	73–61	71–67	77–49	73–63	67–70	74–65	70–65	86–76	94–83	95–84
Ávila Auténtica Carrefour	67–88	—	56–59	75–79	75–87	77–69	79–72	59–67	68–48	79–68	77–73	91–87
Basket Navarra	73–80	76–69	—	81–72	75–65	81–67	85–96	77–59	76–64	63–62	78–70	80–83
Bodegas Rioja Vega	75–72	81–69	76–84	—	82–67	91–65	80–90	74–67	74–79	88–69	88–84	92–84
CB Extremadura Plasencia	79–66	78–79	79–64	74–57	—	85–73	55–77	77–73	65–69	85–51	86–68	90–67
Grupo Eleyco Baskonia B	78–73	92–72	67–76	80–76	77–74	—	68–82	66–74	79–70	74–57	77–83	69–76
Igualitorio Cantabria Estela	63–47	86–67	59–73	78–81	81–75	90–60	—	68–59	52–91	88–73	62–71	91–82
Juaristi ISB	88–93	73–49	72–80	92–74	75–72	73–61	90–85	—	71–66	81–51	74–72	63–64
Marín Ence PeixeGalego	74–75	69–76	81–69	76–65	82–81	73–63	76–61	60–79	—	88–74	82–68	84–73
Quesería La Antigua CB Tormes	79–72	79–67	62–65	68–88	70–67	55–71	79–77	40–71	69–71	—	80–64	69–72
TeslaCard Círculo Gijón	75–79	75–67	77–79	63–59	75–72	87–73	61–65	57–58	104–78	78–66	—	70–56
Zornotza Saskibaloi Taldea	79–72	82–80	82–67	69–77	63–75	98–95	71–61	71–55	71–67	74–68	87–82	—

Source: FEB
Legend: Blue = home team win; Red = away team win.

== Second phase ==
=== Group A1 ===
==== League table ====
Pos	Team	Pld	W	L	PF	PA	PD	Pts	Promotion or qualification
1	HLA Alicante	22	16	6	1673	1520	+153	38	Promotion to LEB Oro
2	CB Villarrobledo	22	15	7	1647	1539	+108	37	Qualification to promotion playoffs
3	Afanion CB Almansa	22	14	8	1705	1631	+74	36	Qualification to promotion playoffs
4	Real Murcia Baloncesto	22	13	9	1586	1493	+93	35	Qualification to promotion playoffs
5	Marín Ence PeixeGalego	22	11	11	1625	1627	−2	33	Qualification to promotion playoffs
6	Basket Navarra	22	11	11	1653	1658	−5	33	
7	Zornotza Saskibaloi Taldea	22	10	12	1603	1649	−46	32	
8	Aquimisa Laboratorios Queso Zamorano	22	10	12	1564	1628	−64	32	
9	Bàsquet Girona	22	10	12	1501	1569	−68	32	
10	Juaristi ISB	22	9	13	1570	1585	−15	31	
11	Igualitorio Cantabria Estela	22	7	15	1561	1674	−113	29	
12	Isover Basket Azuqueca	22	6	16	1558	1673	−115	28	

Source: FEB

==== Positions by round ====
The table lists the positions of teams after completion of each round. In order to preserve chronological evolvements, any postponed matches are not included in the round at which they were originally scheduled, but added to the full round they were played immediately afterwards. For example, if a match is scheduled for round 3, but then postponed and played between rounds 6 and 7, it will be added to the standings for round 6.

Team ╲ Round	S	1	2	3	4	5	6	7	8	9	10	11	12
HLA Alicante	4	1	1	1	1	1	1	1	1	1	1	1	1
CB Villarrobledo	5	4	3	2	2	2	2	2	2	2	2	2	2
Afanion CB Almansa	11	10	9	7	5	5	3	6	4	4	3	3	3
Real Murcia Baloncesto	6	5	4	5	7	7	6	3	3	3	4	4	4
Marín Ence PeixeGalego	8	9	8	10	9	9	8	8	8	8	7	6	5
Basket Navarra	9	8	10	6	6	6	7	7	7	7	6	7	6
Zornotza Saskibaloi Taldea	2	2	5	3	3	4	4	4	6	6	8	9	7
Aquimisa Laboratorios Queso Zamorano	1	3	2	4	4	3	5	5	5	5	5	5	8
Bàsquet Girona	3	6	6	8	8	8	9	9	9	9	9	8	9
Juaristi ISB	12	12	12	11	11	12	12	11	11	11	11	10	10
Igualitorio Cantabria Estela	7	7	7	9	10	10	11	10	10	10	10	11	11
Isover Basket Azuqueca	10	11	11	12	12	11	10	12	12	12	12	12	12

Promotion to LEB Oro
Qualification to promotion playoffs

Source: FEB

==== Results ====
Home \ Away	ALM	ZAM	NAV	GIR	VRO	ALI	EST	AZU	ISB	MAR	MUR	ZOR
Afanion CB Almansa	—	74–58	90–83	—	—	—	83–77	—	61–75	81–62	—	90–56
Aquimisa Laboratorios Queso Zamorano	78–81	—	—	87–68	53–73	66–73	—	81–74	—	—	61–76	—
Basket Navarra	78–81	—	—	73–70	78–74	62–80	—	95–77	—	—	77–51	—
Bàsquet Girona	—	77–70	81–90	—	—	—	66–63	—	69–86	63–70	—	67–65
CB Villarrobledo	—	75–51	74–81	—	—	—	85–66	—	55–64	98–75	—	72–67
HLA Alicante	—	90–65	73–53	—	—	—	81–65	—	80–76	56–64	—	71–57
Igualitorio Cantabria Estela	84–90	—	—	74–81	58–75	68–76	—	71–66	—	—	68–70	—
Isover Basket Azuqueca	—	64–81	57–70	—	—	—	77–92	—	59–74	75–81	—	85–78
Juaristi ISB	77–80	—	—	77–71	72–81	62–76	—	78–71	—	—	71–78	—
Marín Ence PeixeGalego	82–90	—	—	82–72	76–85	91–86	—	77–101	—	—	73–71	—
Real Murcia Baloncesto	—	81–67	101–72	—	—	—	83–69	—	66–57	52–64	—	92–67
Zornotza Saskibaloi Taldea	76–80	—	—	89–66	72–79	78–91	—	70–62	—	—	68–59	—

Source: FEB
Legend: Blue = home team win; Red = away team win.

=== Group A2 ===
==== League table ====
Pos	Team	Pld	W	L	PF	PA	PD	Pts	Relegation
1	Aceitunas Fragata Morón	22	14	8	1530	1461	+69	36	
2	Hestia Menorca	22	14	8	1650	1562	+88	36	
3	Bodegas Rioja Vega	22	13	9	1702	1619	+83	35	
4	Torrons Vicens CB L'Hospitalet	22	13	9	1606	1577	+29	35	
5	Arcos Albacete Basket	22	13	9	1564	1604	−40	35	
6	Grupo Eleyco Baskonia B	22	13	9	1658	1621	+37	35	
7	TeslaCard Círculo Gijón	22	11	11	1666	1619	+47	33	Relegation to Liga EBA
8	CB Extremadura Plasencia	22	10	12	1565	1513	+52	32	Relegation to Liga EBA
9	Ávila Auténtica Carrefour "El Bulevar"	22	10	12	1591	1601	−10	32	Relegation to Liga EBA
10	CB Vic Universitat de Vic	22	8	14	1677	1778	−101	30	Relegation to Liga EBA
11	JAFEP Fundación Globalcaja La Roda	22	7	15	1606	1680	−74	29	Relegation to Liga EBA
12	Quesería La Antigua CB Tormes	22	6	16	1543	1723	−180	28	Relegation to Liga EBA

Source: FEB

==== Positions by round ====
The table lists the positions of teams after completion of each round. In order to preserve chronological evolvements, any postponed matches are not included in the round at which they were originally scheduled, but added to the full round they were played immediately afterwards. For example, if a match is scheduled for round 3, but then postponed and played between rounds 6 and 7, it will be added to the standings for round 6.

Team ╲ Round	S	1	2	3	4	5	6	7	8	9	10	11	12
Aceitunas Fragata Morón	2	1	1	1	1	1	1	1	1	1	1	1	1
Hestia Menorca	4	5	4	4	3	3	3	3	3	3	3	3	2
Bodegas Rioja Vega	1	2	3	2	2	2	2	5	5	5	4	4	3
Torrons Vicens CB L'Hospitalet	8	8	7	8	7	6	5	4	4	4	5	5	4
Arcos Albacete Basket	3	7	6	7	5	4	4	2	2	2	2	2	5
Grupo Eleyco Baskonia B	7	6	8	6	4	5	6	7	6	6	6	6	6
TeslaCard Círculo Gijón	5	3	5	5	8	8	8	9	9	7	7	7	7
CB Extremadura Plasencia	6	4	2	3	6	7	7	8	7	8	8	8	8
Ávila Auténtica Carrefour "El Bulevar"	9	10	9	9	10	11	11	10	10	10	9	9	9
CB Vic Universitat de Vic	10	12	11	10	9	10	9	6	8	9	10	10	10
JAFEP Fundación Globalcaja La Roda	11	9	10	12	11	9	10	11	11	11	11	11	11
Quesería La Antigua CB Tormes	12	11	12	11	12	12	12	12	12	12	12	12	12

Relegation to Liga EBA

Source: FEB

==== Results ====
Home \ Away	MOR	ALB	AVI	CLA	PLA	VIC	BKN	MEN	ROD	TOR	GIJ	HOS
Aceitunas Fragata Morón	—	—	65–68	58–49	59–42	—	63–72	—	—	69–65	64–88	—
Arcos Albacete Basket	—	—	78–67	82–79	64–73	—	81–67	—	—	75–64	69–62	—
Ávila Auténtica Carrefour "El Bulevar"	68–61	86–44	—	—	—	85–74	—	61–57	62–81	—	—	53–59
Bodegas Rioja Vega	65–76	75–58	—	—	—	91–61	—	75–87	81–80	—	—	69–65
CB Extremadura Plasencia	48–60	72–73	—	—	—	82–68	—	95–80	65–56	—	—	58–66
CB Vic Universitat de Vic	—	—	78–71	91–97	81–61	—	88–72	—	—	98–78	67–72	—
Grupo Eleyco Baskonia B	67–66	70–65	—	—	—	95–67	—	70–74	86–72	—	—	83–77
Hestia Menorca	—	—	69–65	92–77	59–56	—	66–75	—	—	82–57	92–74	—
JAFEP Fundación Globalcaja La Roda	—	—	72–93	74–77	71–73	—	56–80	—	—	87–77	88–76	—
Quesería La Antigua CB Tormes	80–81	81–84	—	—	—	83–70	—	77–72	70–73	—	—	99–91
TeslaCard Círculo Gijón	74–77	79–62	—	—	—	72–79	—	72–80	98–70	—	—	86–52
Torrons Vicens CB L'Hospitalet	—	—	82–75	81–78	69–65	—	89–70	—	—	80–49	74–63	—

Source: FEB
Legend: Blue = home team win; Red = away team win.

== Promotion playoffs ==
Team 1	Agg.	Team 2	1st leg	2nd leg
CB Villarrobledo	149–157	Marín Ence PeixeGalego	71–87	78–70
Afanion CB Almansa	152–151	Real Murcia Baloncesto	63–65	89–86

Source: FEB

== Copa LEB Plata ==
The Copa LEB Plata was played on 22 December 2018, by the first qualified team of each group after the end of the first half of the season (round 11 of first phase).

=== Teams qualified ===
Pos	Grp	Team	Pld	W	L	PF	PA	PD	Pts
1	East	HLA Alicante (H)	11	8	3	811	730	+81	19
1	West	Aquimisa Laboratorios Queso Zamorano	11	7	4	848	807	+41	18

Source: FEB
(H) Hosts

=== Game ===
22 December 2018	HLA Alicante	86–68	Aquimisa Laboratorios Queso Zamorano	Alicante
18:00	Scoring by quarter: 30–19, 17–11, 25–14, 14–24
	Pts: Conde 18; Rebs: Conde 9 Asts: Conde 6 Eff: Conde 26	Boxscore	Pts: Niang 18; Rebs: Iza 9 Asts: Niang, Iza 4 Eff: Niang 19	Arena: Pabellón Pedro Ferrándiz; Referees: Vázquez García, Lizana Moreno, Cañigeral Novella

== Final standings ==
Pos	Team	Pld	W	L	Promotion or relegation
1	HLA Alicante (C, P, X)	34	28	6	Promotion to LEB Oro
2	Afanion CB Almansa (P)	36	25	11	Promotion to LEB Oro
3	Marín Ence PeixeGalego (P)	36	20	16	Promotion to LEB Oro
4	CB Villarrobledo	36	23	13	
5	Real Murcia Baloncesto	36	23	13	
6	Basket Navarra	34	22	12	
7	Zornotza Saskibaloi Taldea	34	16	18	
8	Aquimisa Laboratorios Queso Zamorano	34	17	17	
9	Bàsquet Girona	34	18	16	
10	Juaristi ISB	34	19	15	
11	Igualitorio Cantabria Estela	34	15	19	
12	Isover Basket Azuqueca	34	13	21	
13	Aceitunas Fragata Morón	34	16	18	
14	Hestia Menorca	34	18	16	
15	Bodegas Rioja Vega	34	18	16	
16	Torrons Vicens CB L'Hospitalet	34	16	18	
17	Arcos Albacete Basket	34	17	17	
18	Grupo Eleyco Baskonia B	34	15	19	
19	TeslaCard Círculo Gijón (R)	34	14	20	Relegation to Liga EBA
20	CB Extremadura Plasencia (R)	34	15	19	Relegation to Liga EBA
21	Ávila Auténtica Carrefour "El Bulevar" (R)	34	15	19	Relegation to Liga EBA
22	CB Vic Universitat de Vic (R)	34	11	23	Relegation to Liga EBA
23	JAFEP Fundación Globalcaja La Roda (R)	34	10	24	Relegation to Liga EBA
24	Quesería La Antigua CB Tormes (R)	34	8	26	Relegation to Liga EBA

Source: FEB
(C) Champions; (P) Promoted; (R) Relegated; (X) Champion of the Copa LEB Plata

== Awards ==
All official awards of the 2018–19 LEB Plata season.

=== MVP ===
Pos.	Player	Team
PF	(Spain) Jordi Trias	Bàsquet Girona

=== All-LEB Plata Team ===
Pos.	Player	Team
PG	(France) Sangone Niang	Aquimisa Laboratorios Queso Zamorano
SG	(Spain) Saúl Blanco	TeslaCard Círculo Gijón
SF	(United States) Jalen Nesbitt	CB Villarrobledo
PF	(Spain) Jordi Trias	Bàsquet Girona
C	(Spain) Eduardo Hernández-Sonseca	Basket Navarra

=== Copa LEB Plata MVP ===
Pos.	Player	Team
C	(Spain) Álex Galán	HLA Alicante

=== Best Coach ===
Coach	Team
(Spain) Pedro Rivero	HLA Lucentum

=== Player of the round ===
==== First phase ====
Round	Player	Team	Eff.
1	(France) Sangone Niang	Aquimisa Laboratorios Queso Zamorano	46
2	(United States) Jalen Nesbitt	CB Villarrobledo	51
3	(United States) Victor Roberts	CB Extremadura Plasencia	31
4	(Croatia) Leo Čizmić	Bàsquet Girona	35
4	(Argentina) Juampi Sutina	Igualatorio Cantabria Estela	35
5	(United States) Michael Warren	Aquimisa Laboratorios Queso Zamorano	27
6	(Spain) Eduardo Hernández-Sonseca	Basket Navarra	36
7	(United States) Anthony Libroia	Aquimisa Laboratorios Queso Zamorano	32
8	(United States) Duane Morgan	CB Extremadura Plasencia	31
9	(United States) Marcus Van	Arcos Albacete Basket	32
10	(Spain) Jordi Trias	Bàsquet Girona	46
11	(Spain) Víctor Moreno	Quesería La Antigua CB Tormes	36
12	(United States) Bobby Harris	Afanion CB Almansa	33
13	(Jamaica) Vashil Fernandez	Marín Ence PeixeGalego	30
14	(Spain) Jordi Trias (2)	Bàsquet Girona	40
15	(Spain) José Santonja	Afanion CB Almansa	30
16	(United States) Jalen Nesbitt (2)	CB Villarrobledo	35
17	(Spain) Eduardo Hernández-Sonseca (2)	Basket Navarra	37
18	(Spain) Eduardo Hernández-Sonseca (3)	Basket Navarra	31
18	(Spain) Manuel Vázquez	Ávila Autétnica Carrefour "El Bulevar"	31
19	(Canada) Shane Osayande	TeslaCard Círculo Gijón	30
20	(United States) Kevin Bercy	Zornotza Saskibaloi Taldea	44
21	(Spain) Eduardo Hernández-Sonseca (4)	Basket Navarra	34
22	(Jamaica) David Samuels	Igualatorio Cantabria Estela	34

Source: FEB, FEB

==== Second phase ====
Round	Player	Team	Eff.
1	(Canada) Shane Osayande (2)	TeslaCard Círculo Gijón	36
2	(United States) Jalen Nesbitt (2)	CB Villarrobledo	34
3	(Senegal) Biram Faye	Ávila Autétnica Carrefour "El Bulevar"	41
4	(United Kingdom) Rowell Graham	Afanion CB Almansa	36
5	(Guinea) Cheick Condé	HLA Alicante	31
5	(Sweden) Ron Lee	CB Villarrobledo	31
6	(Spain) Andreu Matalí	Hestia Menorca	31
7	(United States) Jalen Nesbitt (3)	CB Villarrobledo	28
8	(United States) Jalen Nesbitt (4)	CB Villarrobledo	42
9	(United States) Connor Beranek	Real Murcia Baloncesto	32
10	(United States) Martyce Kimbrough	TeslaCard Círculo Gijón	34
11	(United States) Andre Norris	Igualatorio Cantabria Estela	39
12	(Guinea) Cheick Condé (2)	HLA Alicante	33

Source: FEB, FEB

==== Promotion playoffs ====
Round	Player	Team	Eff.
1	(United Kingdom) Taiwo Badmus	Marín Ence PeixeGalego	34
2	(United States) Jalen Nesbitt (5)	CB Villarrobledo	41

Source: FEB
