= 2017–18 Liga EBA season =

24th season of the Liga EBA

Liga EBA
- Season: 2017–18
- Teams: 108

Regular season
- Promoted: Marín Ence Peixe Galego; Afanion CB Almansa; Club Bàsquet Menorca; CB Villarrobledo

Finals
- Champions: Marín Ence Peixe Galego

The 2017–18 Liga EBA season was the 24th season of the Spanish basketball fourth league. The season started in September 2017 and ended in May 2018 with the promotion playoffs to LEB Plata.

== Overview before the season ==
Teams are divided in five groups attending to geographical criteria. Groups A, C and D are divided in two.

=== Regular season ===
- Group A–A: Basque Country, Cantabria, Castile and León and Navarre.
- Group A–B: Asturias, Galicia and Castile and León.
- Group B: Community of Madrid, Castile-La Mancha and Canary Islands.
- Groups C–A: Catalonia and Balearic Islands.
- Groups C–B: Aragon, Catalonia and Balearic Islands.
- Group D–A: Andalusia and Melilla.
- Group D–B: Andalusia and Extremadura.
- Group E: Valencian Community and Region of Murcia.

=== Promotion playoffs ===
The three best teams of each group and the fourth of Group D (champion of the previous season) will play the promotion playoffs. From these 16 teams, only four will be promoted to LEB Plata. The winner of each group can organize a group stage.

The promotion playoffs will be played round-robin format in groups of four teams where the first qualified of each group will host one of the stages.

== Regular season ==
=== Group A ===
==== Group A–A ====
Pos	Team	Pld	W	L	PF	PA	PD	Pts	Qualification or relegation
1	Igualitorio Cantabria Estela	30	28	2	2414	2062	+352	58	Qualification to the Final Stage
2	HA Zornotza	30	28	2	2695	2185	+510	58	Qualification to the qualifying playoff
3	Gallofa	30	21	9	2314	2113	+201	51	Qualification to the qualifying playoff
4	Easo Loquillo	30	21	9	2250	1932	+318	51	
5	CB Santurtzi SK	30	18	12	2124	2019	+105	48	
6	Pas Piélagos	30	17	13	2482	2421	+61	47	
7	Universidad de Burgos	30	16	14	2312	2309	+3	46	
8	Megacalzado Ardoi	30	14	16	2236	2255	−19	44	
9	Universidad de Valladolid	30	14	16	2282	2389	−107	44	
10	CB La Flecha	30	13	17	2097	2209	−112	43	Relegation to Primera División
11	Grupo de Santiago Automoción	30	13	17	2255	2357	−102	43	Relegation to Primera División
12	Ordizia Basoa Banaketak	30	9	21	2191	2329	−138	39	Relegation to Primera División
13	CB Valle de Egüés	30	9	21	2005	2202	−197	39	Relegation to Primera División
14	Mondragón Unibersitatea	30	9	21	2178	2314	−136	39	Relegation to Primera División
15	Ulacia Grupo ZKE	30	6	24	1974	2242	−268	36	Relegation to Primera División
16	CBT Gimnástica Sport Café	30	4	26	1924	2395	−471	34	Relegation to Primera División

Source: Liga EBA

==== Group A–B ====
Pos	Team	Pld	W	L	PF	PA	PD	Pts	Qualification or relegation
1	Marín Ence Peixe Galego	30	30	0	2623	1989	+634	60	Qualification to the Final Stage
2	Gijón Basket	30	22	8	2433	2313	+120	52	Qualification to the qualifying playoff
3	Ucoga Seguros CB Chantada	30	21	9	2315	2136	+179	51	Qualification to the qualifying playoff
4	ULE Ingenova Fundación CB León	30	18	12	2279	2276	+3	48	
5	Santo Domingo Betanzos	30	18	12	2345	2253	+92	48	
6	Estudiantes Lugo Leyma Natura	30	16	14	2431	2306	+125	46	
7	Aquimisa Carbajosa	30	15	15	2311	2204	+107	45	
8	Baloncesto Narón	30	15	15	2363	2361	+2	45	
9	Innova Chef	30	14	16	2592	2573	+19	44	
10	Río Ourense Termal B	30	14	16	2028	2035	−7	44	
11	Residencia Las Encinas Ciudad de Ponferrada	30	14	16	2472	2384	+88	44	Relegation to Primera División
12	Instituto Rosalía de Castro	30	11	19	2179	2277	−98	41	Relegation to Primera División
13	Leyma Básquet Coruña B	30	10	20	2305	2517	−212	40	Relegation to Primera División
14	CB Culleredo	30	9	21	2162	2448	−286	39	Relegation to Primera División
15	Obradoiro Silleda B	30	8	22	2039	2251	−212	38	Relegation to Primera División
16	Baloncesto Venta de Baños	30	5	25	2121	2675	−554	35	Relegation to Primera División

Source: Liga EBA

==== Finals ====
===== First-qualified teams playoff =====
The winner of this single-legged series will host one of the four groups of the final stage. The game was played on 5 May at the Pabellón de A Raña in Marín.

Team 1	Score	Team 2
Marín Ence Peixe Galego	73–66	Igualitorio Cantabria Estela

===== Qualifying playoffs =====
The winner qualified for the final stage. The games were played on 5 and 6 May at the Palacio de Deportes of Gijón.

Semifinals
HA Zornotza	69
Ucoga Seguros CB Chantada	50
Gijón Basket	67
Gallofa	84

Final
HA Zornotza	81
Gallofa	66

=== Group B ===
Pos	Team	Pld	W	L	PF	PA	PD	Pts	Qualification or relegation
1	Afanion CB Almansa	30	25	5	2484	2170	+314	55	Qualification to the Final Stage
2	Isover Basket Azuqueca	30	23	7	2549	2278	+271	53	Qualification to the Final Stage
3	CB Villarrobledo	30	23	7	2443	2226	+217	53	Qualification to the Final Stage
4	Real Madrid B	30	23	7	2325	2093	+232	53	
5	Lujisa Guadalajara Basket	30	21	9	2332	2188	+144	51	
6	Náutico KIA Tenerife	30	15	15	2323	2272	+51	45	
7	Movistar Estudiantes B	30	15	15	2220	2158	+62	45	
8	NCS Alcobendas	30	15	15	2283	2199	+84	45	
9	Uros de Rivas Bon Lar	30	13	17	2268	2329	−61	43	
10	Gran Canaria B	30	12	18	2291	2357	−66	42	
11	Estudio	30	11	19	2323	2437	−114	41	
12	Globalcaja Quintanar	30	11	19	2275	2317	−42	41	
13	Aloe Plus Lanzarote Conejeros	30	11	19	2357	2499	−142	41	Relegation to Primera División
14	Novum Energy Liceo Francés	30	9	21	2395	2570	−175	39	Relegation to Primera División
15	Eurocolegio Casvi	30	9	21	2195	2510	−315	39	Relegation to Primera División
16	Maramajo Teguise Lanzarote	30	4	26	1904	2364	−460	34	Relegation to Primera División

Source: Liga EBA

=== Group C ===
==== Group C–A ====
Pos	Team	Pld	W	L	PF	PA	PD	Pts	Qualification or relegation
1	Vive El Masnou Basquetbol	26	19	7	1939	1814	+125	45	Qualification to Final Four
2	Club Bàsquet Menorca	26	19	7	1942	1759	+183	45	Qualification to Final Four
3	Bàsquet Girona	26	17	9	1988	1885	+103	43	
4	Aracena AEC Collblanc	26	17	9	2016	1951	+65	43	
5	Arenys Bàsquet Joventut	26	15	11	1967	1843	+124	41	
6	Ibersol CB Tarragona	26	14	12	1824	1837	−13	40	
7	Oic Penta UB Sant Adrià	26	13	13	1943	1902	+41	39	
8	Coalci CB Sant Josep	26	13	13	1971	2038	−67	39	
9	Mataró Parc Boet	26	13	13	2030	2095	−65	39	
10	Barberà Team Values	26	10	16	1838	1892	−54	36	
11	CB Quart Germans Cruz	26	9	17	1853	1911	−58	35	
12	BBA Castelldefels	26	9	17	1934	1971	−37	35	Qualification to relegation playoffs
13	Club Bàsquet Roser	26	8	18	1795	1923	−128	34	Qualification to relegation playoffs
14	CB Cantaires Tortosa	26	6	20	1923	2142	−219	32	Relegation to Primera División

Source: Liga EBA

==== Group C–B ====
Pos	Team	Pld	W	L	PF	PA	PD	Pts	Qualification or relegation
1	CB Vic Universitat de Vic	26	22	4	2197	1840	+357	48	Qualification to Final Four
2	Ilerdauto Nissan Pardinyes Lleida	26	19	7	1970	1777	+193	45	Qualification to Final Four
3	CB Igualada	26	18	8	2060	1818	+242	44	
4	CB Valls Nutrion	26	17	9	1982	1909	+73	43	
5	Palma Air Europa B	26	16	10	2023	1959	+64	42	
6	Recambios Gaudí CB Mollet	26	15	11	1991	1966	+25	41	
7	CB Cornellà	26	14	12	1889	1870	+19	40	
8	Simply Olivar	26	13	13	2067	2016	+51	39	
9	Mataró Feimat	26	11	15	1885	1827	+58	37	
10	JAC Sants	26	10	16	1762	1838	−76	36	
11	CB Castellbisbal	26	8	18	1807	1992	−185	34	
12	BC MoraBanc Andorra B	26	8	18	1886	2059	−173	34	Qualification to relegation playoffs
13	CB Salt	26	7	19	1776	2048	−272	33	Qualification to relegation playoffs
14	CB Cerdanyola Al Dia	26	4	22	1565	1941	−376	30	Relegation to Primera División

Source: Liga EBA

==== Finals ====
===== Final Four =====
The winner will host one of the four groups of the final stage. Runner-up and third place game winner qualified for the final stage. The games were played on 5 and 6 May at Pavelló Municipal d'Esports of Vic.

Semifinals
Vive El Masnou Basquetbol	86
Ilerdauto Nissan Pardinyes Lleida	82
CB Vic Universitat de Vic	67
Club Bàsquet Menorca	72

Final
Vive El Masnou Basquetbol	56
Club Bàsquet Menorca	79
Third place
Ilerdauto Nissan Pardinyes Lleida	71
CB Vic Universitat de Vic	92

===== Relegation playoffs =====
Winners remained at Liga EBA. First leg was played on 5 and 6 May, second leg on 12 and 13.

Team 1	Agg.	Team 2	1st leg	2nd leg
CB Salt	124–147	BBA Castelldefels	75–64	49–83
Club Bàsquet Roser	138–148	BC MoraBanc Andorra B	77–72	61–76

=== Group D ===
==== Regular season ====
===== Group D–A =====
Pos	Team	Pld	W	L	PF	PA	PD	Pts	Qualification
1	CB Cazorla Jaén Paraíso Interior	18	14	4	1632	1485	+147	32	Qualification to second stage
2	CB Marbella La Cañada	18	13	5	1460	1352	+108	31	Qualification to second stage
3	Forus Medacbasket	18	12	6	1470	1384	+86	30	Qualification to second stage
4	CAM Enrique Soler	18	10	8	1477	1418	+59	28	Qualification to second stage
5	Ecoculture CB Almería	18	10	8	1560	1574	−14	28	Qualification to second stage
6	CB Deportivo Coín	18	9	9	1463	1498	−35	27	Qualification to relegation group
7	Unicaja B	18	8	10	1362	1401	−39	26	Qualification to relegation group
8	CB Novaschool	18	8	10	1333	1403	−70	26	Qualification to relegation group
9	CB Andújar Jaén Paraíso Interior	18	3	15	1311	1427	−116	21	Qualification to relegation group
10	Multiópticas Baza	18	3	15	1322	1448	−126	21	Qualification to relegation group

Source: Liga EBA

===== Group D–B =====
Pos	Team	Pld	W	L	PF	PA	PD	Pts	Qualification
1	Icom UDEA	18	16	2	1439	1210	+229	34	Qualification to second stage
2	Oh!Tels ULB	18	11	7	1426	1331	+95	29	Qualification to second stage
3	Huelva	18	10	8	1304	1304	0	28	Qualification to second stage
4	Yosiquesé	18	9	9	1312	1263	+49	27	Qualification to second stage
5	Jaguarzo Adepla Basket	18	9	9	1423	1440	−17	27	Qualification to second stage
6	Alba Ibs Club Baloncesto Utrera	18	8	10	1311	1299	+12	26	Qualification to relegation group
7	Benahavís Costa del Sol	18	8	10	1279	1289	−10	26	Qualification to relegation group
8	DKV San Fernando	18	8	10	1222	1253	−31	26	Qualification to relegation group
9	Telwi CB San Juan	18	7	11	1351	1423	−72	25	Qualification to relegation group
10	Real Betis Energía Plus B	18	4	14	1234	1489	−255	22	Qualification to relegation group

Source: Liga EBA

==== Second stage ====
===== Group D–Qualification =====
Pos	Team	Pld	W	L	PF	PA	PD	Pts	Qualification
1	CB Cazorla Jaén Paraíso Interior	18	14	4	1627	1414	+213	32	Qualification to the Final Stage
2	CB Marbella La Cañada	18	12	6	1469	1309	+160	30	Qualification to the Final Stage
3	CAM Enrique Soler	18	12	6	1484	1357	+127	30	Qualification to the Final Stage
4	Ecoculture CB Almería	18	12	6	1521	1533	−12	30	
5	Forus Medacbasket	18	10	8	1479	1395	+84	28	
6	Icom UDEA	18	10	8	1346	1307	+39	28	
7	Yosiquesé	18	6	12	1319	1380	−61	24	
8	Huelva	18	6	12	1298	1390	−92	24	
9	Oh!Tels ULB	18	5	13	1231	1400	−169	23	
10	Jaguarzo Adepla Basket	18	3	15	1403	1692	−289	21	

Source: Liga EBA

===== Group D–Relegation =====
Pos	Team	Pld	W	L	PF	PA	PD	Pts	Relegation
1	Multiópticas Baza	18	12	6	1374	1310	+64	30	
2	Alba Ibs Club Baloncesto Utrera	18	11	7	1348	1267	+81	29	
3	CB Deportivo Coín	18	10	8	1335	1390	−55	28	
4	CB Novaschool	18	10	8	1361	1357	+4	28	
5	Benahavís Costa del Sol	18	10	8	1390	1301	+89	28	
6	Unicaja B	18	8	10	1336	1311	+25	26	
7	DKV San Fernando	18	8	10	1284	1305	−21	26	
8	CB Andújar Jaén Paraíso Interior	18	8	10	1311	1319	−8	26	Relegation to Primera División
9	Real Betis Energía Plus B	18	7	11	1203	1302	−99	25	Relegation to Primera División
10	Telwi CB San Juan	18	6	12	1322	1402	−80	24	Relegation to Primera División

Source: Liga EBA

=== Group E ===
==== Regular season ====
Pos	Team	Pld	W	L	PF	PA	PD	Pts	Qualification
1	Hispagán UPB Gandía	22	18	4	1919	1649	+270	40	Qualification to group E–1
2	UCAM Murcia B	22	16	6	1644	1489	+155	38	Qualification to group E–1
3	Valencia BC B	22	16	6	1646	1497	+149	38	Qualification to group E–1
4	Servigroup Benidorm	22	14	8	1717	1589	+128	36	Qualification to group E–1
5	Power Electronics Paterna	22	13	9	1714	1622	+92	35	Qualification to group E–1
6	L'Alfàs PN Serra Gelada	21	13	8	1638	1574	+64	34	Qualification to group E–1
7	UPCT Basket Cartagena	22	10	12	1591	1630	−39	32	Qualification to group E–2
8	Refitel Bàsquet Llíria	22	10	12	1655	1658	−3	32	Qualification to group E–2
9	CB Puerto Sagunto	22	8	14	1557	1700	−143	30	Qualification to group E–2
10	IPS Aldaia	22	7	15	1589	1713	−124	29	Qualification to group E–2
11	UA Fundación Lucentum B	22	4	18	1413	1606	−193	26	Qualification to group E–2
12	CB Innova Begastri	21	2	19	1378	1734	−356	23	Qualification to group E–2

Source: Liga EBA

==== Second stage ====
===== Group E–Qualification =====
Pos	Team	Pld	W	L	PF	PA	PD	Pts	Qualification
1	Hispagán UPB Gandía	15	11	4	1247	1161	+86	26	Qualification to the Final Stage
2	Valencia BC B	15	10	5	1170	1078	+92	25	Qualification to the Final Stage
3	Servigroup Benidorm	15	8	7	1155	1181	−26	23	Qualification to the Final Stage
4	L'Alfàs PN Serra Gelada	15	6	9	1108	1157	−49	21	Qualification to the Final Stage
5	UCAM Murcia B	15	6	9	1087	1122	−35	21	
6	Power Electronics Paterna	15	4	11	1114	1182	−68	19	

Source: Liga EBA

===== Group E–Relegation =====
Pos	Team	Pld	W	L	PF	PA	PD	Pts	Relegation
1	Refitel Bàsquet Llíria	15	11	4	1209	1060	+149	26	
2	CB Puerto Sagunto	15	10	5	1140	1107	+33	25	
3	UPCT Basket Cartagena	15	9	6	1125	1071	+54	24	
4	UA Fundación Lucentum B	15	7	8	1035	1029	+6	22	
5	IPS Aldaia	15	6	9	1071	1108	−37	21	Relegation to Primera División
6	CB Innova Begastri	15	2	13	1013	1218	−205	17	Relegation to Primera División

Source: Liga EBA

== Promotion playoffs ==
The 16 qualified teams will be divided in four groups of four teams. The first qualified teams will host the groups, played with a round-robin format.

The winner of each group will promote to LEB Plata.

=== Group 1 – Gandia ===
Pos	Grp	Team	Pld	W	L	PF	PA	PD	Pts	Promotion
1	B3	CB Villarrobledo (P)	3	3	0	238	221	+17	6	Promotion to LEB Plata
2	D2	CB Marbella La Cañada	3	2	1	240	231	+9	5	
3	C2	Vive El Masnou Basquetbol	3	1	2	235	234	+1	4	
4	E1	Hispagán UPB Gandía (H)	3	0	3	227	254	−27	3	

Source: Liga EBA
(H) Hosts; (P) Promoted

18 May 2018

Boxscore

CB Villarrobledo	77–74	CB Marbella La Cañada

18 May 2018

Boxscore

Hispagán UPB Gandía	78–83	Vive El Masnou Basquetbol

19 May 2018

Boxscore

Vive El Masnou Basquetbol	74–76	CB Villarrobledo

19 May 2018

Boxscore

Hispagán UPB Gandía	76–86	CB Marbella La Cañada

20 May 2018

Boxscore

Vive El Masnou Basquetbol	78–80	CB Marbella La Cañada

20 May 2018

Boxscore

Hispagán UPB Gandía	73–85	CB Villarrobledo

=== Group 2 – Marín ===
Pos	Grp	Team	Pld	W	L	PF	PA	PD	Pts	Promotion
1	A1	Marín Ence Peixe Galego (H, P)	3	3	0	223	201	+22	6	Promotion to LEB Plata
2	B2	Isover Basket Azuqueca	3	2	1	225	196	+29	5	
3	E4	L'Alfàs PN Serra Gelada	3	1	2	198	219	−21	4	
4	E2	Valencia BC B	3	0	3	216	246	−30	3	

Source: Liga EBA
(H) Hosts; (P) Promoted

18 May 2018

Boxscore

Valencia BC B	72–81	L'Alfàs PN Serra Gelada

18 May 2018

Boxscore

Marín Ence Peixe Galego	74–62	Isover Basket Azuqueca

19 May 2018

Boxscore

Isover Basket Azuqueca	81–68	Valencia BC B

19 May 2018

Boxscore

Marín Ence Peixe Galego	65–63	L'Alfàs PN Serra Gelada

20 May 2018

Boxscore

L'Alfàs PN Serra Gelada	54–82	Isover Basket Azuqueca

20 May 2018

Boxscore

Valencia BC B	76–84	Marín Ence Peixe Galego

=== Group 3 – Almansa ===
Pos	Grp	Team	Pld	W	L	PF	PA	PD	Pts	Promotion
1	B1	Afanion CB Almansa (H, P)	3	3	0	260	222	+38	6	Promotion to LEB Plata
2	C3	CB Vic Universitat de Vic	3	2	1	248	221	+27	5	
3	A2	Igualitorio Cantabria Estela	3	1	2	220	234	−14	4	
4	D3	CAM Enrique Soler	3	0	3	191	242	−51	3	

Source: Liga EBA
(H) Hosts; (P) Promoted

18 May 2018

Boxscore

Igualitorio Cantabria Estela	75–71	CAM Enrique Soler

18 May 2018

Boxscore

Afanion CB Almansa	94–84	CB Vic Universitat de Vic

19 May 2018

Boxscore

Igualitorio Cantabria Estela	67–78	CB Vic Universitat de Vic

19 May 2018

Boxscore

Afanion CB Almansa	81–60	CAM Enrique Soler

20 May 2018

Boxscore

CAM Enrique Soler	60–86	CB Vic Universitat de Vic

20 May 2018

Boxscore

Afanion CB Almansa	85–78	Igualitorio Cantabria Estela

=== Group 4 – Mahón ===
Pos	Grp	Team	Pld	W	L	PF	PA	PD	Pts	Promotion
1	C1	Club Bàsquet Menorca (H, P)	3	3	0	270	216	+54	6	Promotion to LEB Plata
2	A3	HA Zornotza	3	2	1	239	230	+9	5	
3	D1	CB Cazorla Jaén Paraíso Interior	3	1	2	250	267	−17	4	
4	E3	Servigroup Benidorm	3	0	3	226	272	−46	3	

Source: Liga EBA
(H) Hosts; (P) Promoted

18 May 2018

Boxscore

HA Zornotza	92–82	CB Cazorla Jaén Paraíso Interior

18 May 2018

Boxscore

Club Bàsquet Menorca	89–84	Servigroup Benidorm

19 May 2018

Boxscore

CB Cazorla Jaén Paraíso Interior	67–104	Club Bàsquet Menorca

19 May 2018

Boxscore

HA Zornotza	82–71	Servigroup Benidorm

20 May 2018

Boxscore

Servigroup Benidorm	71–101	CB Cazorla Jaén Paraíso Interior

20 May 2018

Boxscore

Club Bàsquet Menorca	77–65	HA Zornotza
