= Basket Azuqueca =

- League: LEB Plata
- Founded: December 11, 1997; 27 years ago
- Arena: Polideportivo La Paz
- Location: Azuqueca de Henares, Spain
- Team colors: Red and white
- Head coach: Sergio Vicente
Home	Away

Basket Azuqueca, also known as Isover Basket Azuqueca for sponsorship reasons, is a professional basketball club based in Azuqueca de Henares, Castile-La Mancha, that currently plays in LEB Plata, the third tier of Spanish basketball.

== History ==
Basket Azuqueca was founded on 11 December 1997 after the dissolution of former CB Azuqueca, that played in the second tier during the 1991–92 season, and as a merge of the two local clubs: Baloncesto Azuqueca and Construcciones Diego Velásquez.

In 2004, the club achieved promotion to Primera División after only losing two games in all the season. Three years later, Azuqueca was close to promote to Liga EBA after finishing the season in the fifth place. After several seasons being close to promote, they finally achieved that goal in 2011 in a promotion stage played in Madrid.

Basket Azuqueca remained narrowly during their first seasons in the league and in 2014 was close to be folded, but finally people of the club took the helm to avoid a new dissolution.

In 2018, after failing in the promotion playoffs, Azuqueca achieved a vacant place in LEB Plata, third division, due to its expansion to 24 teams.

== Players ==
=== Current roster ===
Note: Flags indicate national team eligibility at FIBA-sanctioned events. Players may hold other non-FIBA nationalities not displayed.

Isover Basket Azuqueca roster
Players
Coaches

Pos.	No.	Nat.	Name	Ht.	Age
SG		(Spain)	Apolinario, Carlos		29 – 20 January 1996
SG		(Spain)	Ballespín, Ignacio	1.94 m (6 ft 4 in)	26 – 18 April 1998
PG		(Spain)	Calvo, Carlos		31 – 24 February 1994
SF		(Spain)	García, Carlos	2.00 m (6 ft 7 in)	26 – 28 March 1998
PG		(Spain)	Hidalgo, Carlos	1.85 m (6 ft 1 in)	27 – 26 March 1997
SG		(United States)	Mitchell, Ervin	1.93 m (6 ft 4 in)
C		(Democratic Republic of the Congo)	Mukendi, Gullit		28 – 21 May 1996
PF		(Montenegro)	Radunović, Mihailo	2.04 m (6 ft 8 in)	28 – 27 March 1996
SF		(Spain)	Rodríguez, Nacho	2.01 m (6 ft 7 in)	31 – 6 January 1994
PG		(Spain)	Rojas, Álvaro (C)	1.73 m (5 ft 8 in)	40 – 12 October 1984
PF		(Nigeria)	Solarin, Jeff		32 – 16 November 1992
SF		(Venezuela)	Valera, Luis	2.02 m (6 ft 8 in)	36 – 21 October 1988

Head coach

- (Spain) Sergio Vicente

Legend

- (C) Team captain
- Injured

=== Depth chart ===
Pos.	Starting 5	Bench 1	Bench 2
C	Gullit Mukendi
PF	Jeff Solarin	Mihailo Radunović
SF	Luis Valera	Nacho Rodríguez	Carlos García
SG	Carlos Apolinario	Ervin Mitchell	Ignacio Ballespín
PG	Álvaro Rojas	Carlos Calvo	Carlos Hidalgo

Colours: Blue = homegrown player; Red = non–FIBA Europe player

== Season by season ==
Season	Tier	Division	Pos.	W–L
2003–04	6	1ª Autonómica	1st	26–2
2004–05	5	1ª División	9th	13–17
2005–06	5	1ª División	8th	13–15
2006–07	5	1ª División	6th	16–14
2007–08	5	1ª División	11th	12–16
2008–09	6	1ª División	5th	17–9
2009–10	5	1ª División	2nd	23–5
2010–11	5	1ª División	2nd	27–3
2011–12	4	Liga EBA	12th	11–19
2012–13	4	Liga EBA	12th	9–19
2013–14	4	Liga EBA	8th	16–14
2014–15	4	Liga EBA	8th	12–14
2015–16	4	Liga EBA	4th	16–10
2016–17	4	Liga EBA	5th	21–9
2017–18	4	Liga EBA	2nd (Note: Achieved a vacant place after the expansion of the LEB Plata.)	25–8
2018–19	3	LEB Plata	12th (Note: Resigned to its place in LEB Plata.)	13–21
2019–20	4	Liga EBA	8th	12–11

== Notable players ==
To appear in this section a player must have either:

- Set a club record or won an individual award as a professional player.
- Played at least one official international match for his senior national team at any time.

- (Democratic Republic of the Congo) Gullit Mukendi
- (United States) Phil Henry
