= CB Myrtia =

Spanish basketball team

Real Murcia
- Leagues: LEB Oro
- Founded: 1978
- History: CB Capuchinos (1960s–2013); CB Myrtia Murcia (2013–present)
- Arena: Príncipe de Asturias
- Capacity: 3,500
- Location: Murcia, Spain
- Team colors: Red and white
- Head coach: Rafa Monclova
- Championships: 1 Liga EBA Championship
- Website: realmurcia.es
Home	Away

Club Baloncesto Myrtia Murcia, also known as Real Murcia Baloncesto for sponsorship reasons, is a Spanish basketball team based in Murcia that currently plays in LEB Oro.

== History ==
Local club Club Baloncesto Capuchinos, one of the main teams in Murcia, changed its name to Club Baloncesto Myrtia in 2013, with the aim to be a team where to continue playing for homegrown players.

In 2015, the club was admitted in Liga EBA and, in its first season, it qualified for the promotion playoffs to LEB Plata but failed in its attempt. In the next season, the club qualified to this stage as group champion and finally promoted on 21 July 2017, in the final stage played at their home arena.

In August 2017, the club agreed a collaboration contract with football club Real Murcia and would start using their name, their logo and their colors.

== Season by season ==
Season	Tier	Division	Pos.	W–L
2013–14	5	1ª División	3rd	17–5
2014–15	6	1ª Autonómica	2nd (Note: Was admitted in Liga EBA.)	18–2
2015–16	4	Liga EBA	3rd	21-8
2016–17	4	Liga EBA	1st	25–4
2017–18	3	LEB Plata	12th	12–18
2018–19	3	LEB Plata	5th	23–13
2019–20	3	LEB Plata	1st (Note: Season curtailed due to the COVID-19 pandemic.)	19–6

== Trophies and awards ==
=== Trophies ===
- Liga EBA: (1)
  - 2016–17

== Players ==
=== Current roster ===
Note: Flags indicate national team eligibility at FIBA-sanctioned events. Players may hold other non-FIBA nationalities not displayed.

Real Murcia Baloncesto roster
Players
Coaches

Pos.	No.	Nat.	Name	Ht.	Age
PG	11	(Spain)	Coello, Juanjo	1.82 m (6 ft 0 in)	36 – 26 September 1988
PF	14	(Serbia)	Gavrilović, Strahinja	2.06 m (6 ft 9 in)	32 – 5 April 1993
PG	30	(Spain)	Hernández, Álex	1.90 m (6 ft 3 in)	35 – 12 February 1990
PG		(United States)	Martin, Jaron	1.78 m (5 ft 10 in)	30 – 6 March 1995
SF	23	(United States)	Norris, Andre	2.01 m (6 ft 7 in)	30 – 20 June 1994
C	0	(Nigeria)	Okeke, Duby	2.03 m (6 ft 8 in)	30 – 25 November 1994
C	15	(Jamaica)	Robinson, Clint	2.03 m (6 ft 8 in)	30 – 26 September 1994
SF	7	(Spain)	Rubio, Juan	1.98 m (6 ft 6 in)	29 – 17 November 1995
PF	32	(Nigeria)	Solarin, Jeff	1.93 m (6 ft 4 in)	32 – 16 November 1992
C	19	(Senegal)	Sow, Ablaye	2.08 m (6 ft 10 in)	26 – 20 February 1999
SG	21	(United Kingdom)	Whelan, Patrick	1.96 m (6 ft 5 in)	28 – 25 August 1996

Head coach

- (Spain) Rafa Monclova

Legend

- (C) Team captain
- Injured

- Roster
Updated: January 5, 2021

=== Depth chart ===
Pos.	Starting 5	Bench 1	Bench 2
C	Clint Robinson	Duby Okeke	Ablaye Sow
PF	Jeff Solarin	Daniel Mortensen
SF	Andre Norris	Juan Rubio
SG	Grant Lozoya	Patrick Whelan
PG	Álex Hernández	Frederik Nielsen	Juanjo Coello

Colours: Blue = homegrown player; Red = non-FIBA Europe player
