= Basket Burgos 2002 =

- Leagues: Liga EBA
- Founded: 2002; 23 years ago
- Folded: 2018; 7 years ago
- Arena: Polideportivo El Plantío
- Capacity: 2,500
- Location: Burgos, Spain
- Team colors: Blue and Red
- Website: basketburgos2002.club
Home	Away

Club Basket Burgos 2002, also known by sponsorship reasons as Grupo de Automoción Santiago, was a basketball team based in Burgos, Castile and Lion, Spain, who currently plays in Liga EBA.

== History ==
Club logo until 2017.

Basket Burgos 2002 was founded in that year with the aim of playing in the Provincial League of Burgos, that works independently of the Spanish league system.

On 2010, after being relegated CD Juventud del Círculo from Liga EBA to 1ª División, some players and the coach of the team decided to create a Primera División team of Basket Burgos 2002. On 2010-11 season, the team finished as runner-up of the Castile and Lion group, and promotes to Liga EBA after winning the final stage celebrated in Burgos.

In their first season, Basket Burgos was relegated but remained in the league by achieving a vacant place.

In 2017, the club agreed collaboration terms with CB Miraflores, main club of the city, and started acting as its farm team.

In 2018, Basket Burgos 2002 was completely integrated in CB Miraflores and dissolved as independent club.

== Head coaches ==
- Miguel Ángel Segura 2010–2015
- Evaristo Pérez 2015–2018

== Season by season ==
Season	Tier	Division	Pos.	W–L
2010–11	5	1ª División	2nd	19–6
2011–12	4	Liga EBA	19th (Note: Remained in the league after achieving a vacant berth.)	10–14
2012–13	4	Liga EBA	10th	13–9
2013–14	4	Liga EBA	15th	9–13
2014–15	4	Liga EBA	11th	10–16
2015–16	4	Liga EBA	13th (Note: Remained in the league after achieving a vacant berth.)	7–19
2016–17	4	Liga EBA	8th	12–14
2017–18	4	Liga EBA	11th	13–17

== Notable players ==
- (United Kingdom) Jules Dang Akodo
