= 2019–20 Liga EBA season =

Liga EBA
- Season: 2019–20
- Teams: 109

Regular season
- Promoted: Mondragón Unibersitatea; Aquimisa Carbajosa; NCS Alcobendas; Ibersol CB Tarragona; CAM Enrique Soler; Hero Jairis

The 2019–20 Liga EBA season was the 26th season of the Spanish basketball fourth league. It started on 21 September 2019 with the first round of the regular season and was curtailed on 8 May 2020 due to the COVID-19 pandemic.

== Season summary ==
On March 10, 2020, the Government of Spain decreed that all games would be played behind closed doors due to the COVID-19 pandemic. On March 12, 2020, the Spanish Basketball Federation postponed all the games of the next two weeks. On March 18, 2020, the Spanish Basketball Federation extended the postponement of the games until March 29 due to the state of alarm. On March 25, 2020, the Spanish Basketball Federation extended the postponement of the games until April 12 due to the extension of state of alarm.

On May 8, 2020, the Spanish Basketball Federation finished prematurely the regular season due to force majeure with the following decisions:

- Relegations to Primera División were revoked.
- Six promotions to LEB Plata were agreed as follows:
  - The top team in each of the five conferences as of March 8 promoted directly to LEB Plata.
  - The 6th promotion were determined under a ranking among the next best qualified team of the five conferences as of March 8, using as criteria the number of years of participation in FEB competitions during the last five seasons. In case of a tie, the number of participations in higher competitions during the last five seasons would be valued differently.

On June 22, 2020, the Spanish Basketball Federation announced the six teams that promoted to LEB Plata.

Before this announcement, Universitat de Vic CB Vic, best team of the Group C, resigned to promotion.

== Conference A ==
The Conference A consisted of 2 groups of 15 and 14 teams from Galicia, Asturias, Cantabria, Castile and León, Navarre, La Rioja and Basque Country.

=== Teams ===
Team	Home city	Autonomous federation	Arena
AC1+ Piélagos	Renedo de Piélagos	Cantabria	Fernando Expósito
Aquimisa Carbajosa	Carbajosa de la Sagrada	Castile and León	Municipal
Arha Hoteles	Santander	Cantabria	Palacio de Deportes
Ávila Auténtica Carrefour "El Bulevar"	Ávila	Castile and León	Carlos Sastre
Baskonia B	Vitoria-Gasteiz	Basque Country	Mendizorrotza
Caja Rural de Zamora	Zamora	Castile and León	Ángel Nieto
Calvo Basket Xiria	Carballo	Galicia	Vila de Noia
CB La Flecha	Arroyo de la Encomienda	Castile and León	La Vega
CB Santurtzi SK	Santurtzi	Basque Country	Mikel Trueba
CB Solares	Medio Cudeyo	Cantabria	Mies del Corro
CB Valle de Egüés	Valle de Egüés	Navarre	Maristas
Easo Bodegas Muga	San Sebastián	Basque Country	José Antonio Gasca
Estudiantes Lugo Leyma Natura	Lugo	Galicia	Pazo dos Deportes
Goierri Iparragirre 2020	Urretxu	Basque Country	Aldiri
KFC Culleredo	Culleredo	Galicia	O Burgo
Manteneo Filipenses	Palencia	Castile and León	Municipal
Megacalzado Ardoi	Zizur Mayor-Zizur Nagusia	Navarre	Municipal
Mondragón Unibersitatea	Mondragón	Basque Country	Iturripe
Nissan Grupo de Santiago	Burgos	Castile and León	El Plantío
Noxtrum Gijón Basket	Gijón	Asturias	Palacio de Deportes
Obradoiro Silleda B	Santiago de Compostela	Galicia	César González Fares
Porriño Baloncesto Base	O Porriño	Galicia	Porriño 2
Santo Domingo Betanzos	Betanzos	Galicia	Municipal
Tabirako Baqué	Durango	Basque Country	Landako
Ucoga Seguros CB Chantada	Chantada	Galicia	Municipal
Ulacia Zarautz	Zarautz	Basque Country	Aritzbatalde
ULE RBH Global	León	Castile and León	Palacio de los Deportes
Universidad de Valladolid	Valladolid	Castile and León	Fuente de La Mora
USAL La Antigua	Salamanca	Castile and León	Würzburg

=== Regular season ===
==== Group A–A ====
Pos	Team	Pld	W	L	PF	PA	PD	Pts	Promotion
1	Mondragón Unibersitatea	22	17	5	1752	1583	+169	39	Promotion to LEB Plata
2	Arha Hoteles	22	15	7	1728	1553	+175	37	
3	Megacalzado Ardoi	22	15	7	1657	1527	+130	37	
4	AC1+ Piélagos	21	15	6	1786	1549	+237	36	
5	Easo Bodegas Muga	22	14	8	1560	1391	+169	36	
6	CB La Flecha	22	11	11	1638	1612	+26	33	
7	Nissan Grupo de Santiago	22	11	11	1622	1645	−23	33	
8	Baskonia B	22	11	11	1710	1715	−5	33	
9	CB Valle de Egüés	21	10	11	1485	1542	−57	31	
10	CB Santurtzi SK	22	9	13	1538	1515	+23	31	
11	CB Solares (Note: Relegations to Primera División were revoked due to the COVID-19 pandemic.)	22	9	13	1704	1774	−70	31	
12	Ulacia Zarautz	21	9	12	1439	1543	−104	30	
13	Tabirako Baqué	22	8	14	1461	1568	−107	30	
14	Goierri Iparragirre 2020	22	7	15	1544	1706	−162	29	
15	Manteneo Filipenses	21	2	19	1278	1679	−401	23	

Source: FEB

==== Group A–B ====
Pos	Team	Pld	W	L	PF	PA	PD	Pts	Promotion
1	Aquimisa Carbajosa	20	20	0	1651	1293	+358	40	Promotion to LEB Plata
2	Ávila Auténtica Carrefour "El Bulevar"	20	16	4	1629	1341	+288	36	
3	Ucoga Seguros CB Chantada	20	15	5	1461	1252	+209	35	
4	Porriño Baloncesto Base	20	13	7	1520	1492	+28	33	
5	Noxtrum Gijón Basket	20	11	9	1523	1539	−16	31	
6	Obradoiro Silleda B	20	11	9	1572	1518	+54	31	
7	USAL La Antigua	20	10	10	1546	1530	+16	30	
8	Santo Domingo Betanzos	20	8	12	1515	1607	−92	28	
9	KFC Culleredo	20	8	12	1412	1475	−63	28	
10	Estudiantes Lugo Leyma Natura	20	8	12	1570	1539	+31	28	
11	Universidad de Valladolid (Note: Relegations to Primera División were revoked due to the COVID-19 pandemic.)	20	7	13	1416	1531	−115	27	
12	Calvo Basket Xiria	20	5	15	1405	1545	−140	25	
13	Caja Rural de Zamora	20	4	16	1461	1707	−246	24	
14	ULE RBH Global	20	4	16	1310	1622	−312	24	

Source: FEB

== Conference B ==
The Conference B consisted of 16 teams from Canary Islands, Castilla–La Mancha and Community of Madrid.

=== Teams ===
Team	Home city	Autonomous federation	Arena
Aloe Plus Lanzarote Conejeros	Arrecife	Canary Islands	Ciudad Deportiva
Baloncesto Alcalá	Alcalá de Henares	Community of Madrid	Espartales
CB Agüimes	Agüimes	Canary Islands	Municipal
CB Pozuelo Arrabe Asesores	Pozuelo de Alarcón	Community of Madrid	El Torreón
Distrito Olímpico	Madrid	Community of Madrid	San Blas
Estudio	Madrid	Community of Madrid	Paco Hernández
Globalcaja Quintanar	Quintanar del Rey	Castilla–La Mancha	Ángel Lancho
Isover Basket Azuqueca	Azuqueca de Henares	Castilla–La Mancha	La Paz
Lujisa Guadalajara Basket	Guadalajara	Castilla–La Mancha	San José
Movistar Estudiantes B	Madrid	Community of Madrid	Antonio Magariños
Náutico Tenerife	Santa Cruz de Tenerife	Canary Islands	RCNT
NCS Alcobendas	Alcobendas	Community of Madrid	Antela Parada
Real Madrid B	Madrid	Community of Madrid	Ciudad Real Madrid
Tobarra CB	Tobarra	Castilla–La Mancha	La Granja
Uros de Rivas	Rivas-Vaciamadrid	Community of Madrid	Cerro del Telégrafo
Zentro Basket Madrid	Madrid	Community of Madrid	Antonio Díaz Miguel

=== Regular season ===
==== League table ====
Pos	Team	Pld	W	L	PF	PA	PD	Pts	Promotion
1	NCS Alcobendas	23	19	4	1834	1546	+288	42	Promotion to LEB Plata
2	Uros de Rivas	24	18	6	1860	1711	+149	42	
3	Real Madrid B	23	17	6	1934	1782	+152	40	
4	Náutico Tenerife	24	14	10	1838	1659	+179	38	
5	Zentro Basket Madrid	23	14	9	1825	1756	+69	37	
6	Globalcaja Quintanar	23	14	9	1643	1596	+47	37	
7	Distrito Olímpico	23	12	11	1666	1650	+16	35	
8	Isover Basket Azuqueca	23	12	11	1734	1705	+29	35	
9	Baloncesto Alcalá	23	11	12	1771	1767	+4	34	
10	Tobarra CB	23	11	12	1639	1670	−31	34	
11	Estudio	23	11	12	1977	1944	+33	34	
12	Movistar Estudiantes B	23	10	13	1732	1737	−5	33	
13	Lujisa Guadalajara Basket (Note: Relegations to Primera División were revoked due to the COVID-19 pandemic.)	23	9	14	1623	1744	−121	32	
14	CB Pozuelo Arrabe Asesores	23	5	18	1624	1874	−250	28	
15	Aloe Plus Lanzarote Conejeros	23	4	19	1579	1856	−277	27	
16	CB Agüimes	23	4	19	1451	1733	−282	27	

Source: FEB

== Conference C ==
The Conference C consisted of 2 groups of 14 teams from Aragon, Catalonia and Balearic Islands.

=== Teams ===
Team	Home city	Autonomous federation	Arena
70&80 American Dinner CB Salou	Salou	Catalonia	Centre Salou
AE Badalonès	Badalona	Catalonia	Pavelló La Plana
Anagan Olivar	Zaragoza	Aragon	Miralbueno
Barberà Team Values	Barberà del Vallès	Catalonia	Can Serra
BBA Castelldefels	Castelldefels	Catalonia	Can Vinader
Camping Bianya Roser	Barcelona	Catalonia	Poliesportiu Estacio del Nord
CB Cornellà	Cornellà de Llobregat	Catalonia	Parc Esportiu
CB Martorell	Martorell	Catalonia	Municipal
CB Quart Germans Cruz	Quart	Catalonia	Municipal
CB Valls Nutrion	Valls	Catalonia	Joana Ballart
CB Vic Universitat de Vic	Vic	Catalonia	Castell d'en Planes
FC Martinenc Bàsquet	Barcelona	Catalonia	Guinardó
Flanigan Calvià	Calvià	Balearic Islands	Galatzó
Ibersol CB Tarragona	Tarragona	Catalonia	El Serrallo
JAC Sants	Barcelona	Catalonia	Espanya Industrial
Maristes Ademar	Badalona	Catalonia	Pavelló La Plana
Mataró Parc Boet	Mataró	Catalonia	Eusebi Millán
MCNTeam SESE	Barcelona	Catalonia	Ramon Aldufreu Virrei Amat
Monbus CB Igualada	Igualada	Catalonia	Les Comes
MoraBanc Andorra Vivand B	Andorra la Vella	Catalonia	Poliesportiu d'Andorra
Oic Penta UB Sant Adrià	Sant Adrià de Besòs	Catalonia	Municipal
Opel Zavisa Alfindén CB	La Puebla de Alfindén	Aragon	Municipal
Open Sports Arenys Bàsquet	Arenys de Mar	Catalonia	Fons de les Creus
Palma Air Europa B	Palma de Mallorca	Balearic Islands	Toni Servera
Patria Hispana Seguros Almozara	Zaragoza	Aragon	CDM Siglo XXI
Recambios Gaudí CB Mollet	Mollet del Vallès	Catalonia	Plana Lledó
Tenea CB Esparreguera	Esparreguera	Catalonia	Ramon Martí
UE Mataró Germans Homs	Mataró	Catalonia	Josep Mora

=== Regular season ===
==== Group C–A ====
Pos	Team	Pld	W	L	PF	PA	PD	Pts
1	CB Vic Universitat de Vic	21	19	2	1656	1362	+294	40
2	Monbus CB Igualada	21	17	4	1601	1428	+173	38
3	CB Quart Germans Cruz	21	16	5	1530	1410	+120	37
4	FC Martinenc Bàsquet	21	14	7	1616	1539	+77	35
5	MCNTeam SESE	21	14	7	1609	1531	+78	35
6	CB Martorell	20	12	8	1447	1425	+22	32
7	Flanigan Calvià	21	9	12	1627	1629	−2	30
8	Maristes Ademar	21	9	12	1420	1515	−95	30
9	Open Sports Arenys Bàsquet	21	8	13	1383	1443	−60	29
10	Tenea CB Esparreguera	21	7	14	1511	1544	−33	28
11	MoraBanc Andorra Vivand B	21	6	15	1378	1443	−65	27
12	Opel Zavisa Alfindén CB (Note: Relegations to Primera División were revoked due to the COVID-19 pandemic.)	21	6	15	1477	1651	−174	27
13	Mataró Parc Boet	20	5	15	1395	1575	−180	25
14	Patria Hispana Seguros Almozara	21	4	17	1444	1599	−155	25

Source: FEB

==== Group C–B ====
Pos	Team	Pld	W	L	PF	PA	PD	Pts	Promotion
1	Ibersol CB Tarragona	21	18	3	1605	1314	+291	39	Promotion to LEB Plata
2	Oic Penta UB Sant Adrià	21	15	6	1576	1420	+156	36	
3	Recambios Gaudí CB Mollet	21	14	7	1606	1514	+92	35	
4	CB Valls Nutrion	21	14	7	1556	1463	+93	35	
5	BBA Castelldefels	21	13	8	1501	1405	+96	34	
6	UE Mataró Germans Homs	21	13	8	1503	1442	+61	34	
7	CB Cornellà	21	12	9	1540	1503	+37	33	
8	70&80 American Dinner CB Salou	21	11	10	1543	1563	−20	32	
9	AE Badalonès	21	10	11	1545	1597	−52	31	
10	Anagan Olivar	21	8	13	1493	1626	−133	29	
11	JAC Sants	21	6	15	1343	1454	−111	27	
12	Barberà Team Values (Note: Relegations to Primera División were revoked due to the COVID-19 pandemic.)	21	5	16	1419	1537	−118	26	
13	Palma Air Europa B	21	4	17	1510	1649	−139	25	
14	Camping Bianya Roser	21	4	17	1435	1688	−253	25	

Source: FEB

== Conference D ==
The Conference D consisted of 2 groups of 10 and 9 teams from Andalusia, Extremadura, Ceuta and Melilla.

=== Teams ===
Team	Home city	Autonomous federation	Arena
AD Plasencia Basket	Plasencia	Extremadura	Centro Universitario
Alba Ibs Club Baloncesto Utrera	Utrera	Andalusia	Pepe Álvarez
Benahavís Costa del Sol	Benahavís	Andalusia	Municipal
CAM Enrique Soler	Melilla	Melilla	Guillermo García Pezzi
CB La Zubia	La Zubia	Andalusia	11 de marzo
CB Novaschool	Rincón de la Victoria	Andalusia	Novaschool Añoreta
CP Mijas Quabit	Mijas	Andalusia	Regino Hernández
DKV San Fernando	San Fernando	Andalusia	Almirante Laulhé
Ecoculture CB Almería	Almería	Andalusia	Moisés Ruiz
Huelva	Huelva	Andalusia	Andrés Estrada
Jaén Paraíso Interior CB Andújar	Andújar	Andalusia	Municipal
Jaén Paraíso Interior CB Cazorla	Cazorla	Andalusia	Municipal
Jaén Paraíso Interior CB Martos	Martos	Andalusia	Municipal de la Juventud
Matenglish CB San Fernando	San Fernando	Andalusia	Municipal
Oh!Tels ULB	La Línea de la Concepción	Andalusia	Municipal
Real Betis Baloncesto B	Seville	Andalusia	Illanes
Rus CB Ciudad de Dos Hermanas	Dos Hermanas	Andalusia	Los Montecillos
Torta del Casar Extremadura B	Cáceres	Extremadura	Casar de Cáceres
Unicaja Andalucía B	Málaga	Andalusia	Los Guindos

=== Regular season ===
==== Group D–A ====
Pos	Team	Pld	W	L	PF	PA	PD	Pts	Qualification
1	CAM Enrique Soler	18	17	1	1546	1278	+268	35	Qualification to promotion group
2	CB Novaschool	18	13	5	1431	1269	+162	31	Qualification to promotion group
3	Ecoculture CB Almería	18	12	6	1379	1274	+105	30	Qualification to promotion group
4	CB La Zubia	18	10	8	1353	1322	+31	28	Qualification to promotion group
5	Jaén Paraíso Interior CB Andújar	18	10	8	1302	1258	+44	28	Qualification to promotion group
6	Unicaja Andalucía B	18	7	11	1282	1362	−80	25	Qualification to relegation group
7	Benahavís Costa del Sol	18	6	12	1343	1434	−91	24	Qualification to relegation group
8	Jaén Paraíso Interior CB Cazorla	18	6	12	1281	1524	−243	24	Qualification to relegation group
9	Jaén Paraíso Interior CB Martos	18	5	13	1343	1446	−103	23	Qualification to relegation group
10	CP Mijas Quabit	18	4	14	1241	1334	−93	22	Qualification to relegation group

Source: FEB

==== Group D–B ====
Pos	Team	Pld	W	L	PF	PA	PD	Pts	Qualification
1	Oh!Tels ULB	16	12	4	1200	1076	+124	28	Qualification to promotion group
2	Huelva	16	12	4	1226	1126	+100	28	Qualification to promotion group
3	DKV San Fernando	16	10	6	1187	1106	+81	26	Qualification to promotion group
4	Alba Ibs Club Baloncesto Utrera	16	10	6	1249	1118	+131	26	Qualification to promotion group
5	Torta del Casar Extremadura B	16	9	7	1036	1052	−16	25	Qualification to promotion group
6	Rus CB Ciudad de Dos Hermanas	16	7	9	1069	1083	−14	23	Qualification to relegation group
7	AD Plasencia Basket	16	5	11	1127	1219	−92	21	Qualification to relegation group
8	Real Betis Baloncesto B	16	5	11	1120	1199	−79	21	Qualification to relegation group
9	Matenglish CB San Fernando	16	2	14	985	1220	−235	18	Qualification to relegation group

Source: FEB

=== Second stage ===
==== Promotion group ====
Pos	Team	Pld	W	L	PF	PA	PD	Pts	Promotion
1	CAM Enrique Soler	11	11	0	938	786	+152	22	Promotion to LEB Plata
2	Huelva	11	8	3	853	789	+64	19	
3	CB Novaschool	11	7	4	810	763	+47	18	
4	Oh!Tels ULB	11	7	4	779	752	+27	18	
5	Alba Ibs Club Baloncesto Utrera	11	4	7	817	800	+17	15	
6	Ecoculture CB Almería	11	4	7	797	830	−33	15	
7	CB La Zubia	11	4	7	769	825	−56	15	
8	Torta del Casar Extremadura B	11	4	7	674	771	−97	15	
9	Jaén Paraíso Interior CB Andújar	11	3	8	746	804	−58	14	
10	DKV San Fernando	11	3	8	768	831	−63	14	

Source: FEB

==== Relegation group ====
Pos	Team	Pld	W	L	PF	PA	PD	Pts
1	CP Mijas Quabit	11	5	6	827	774	+53	16
2	Jaén Paraíso Interior CB Cazorla	11	5	6	858	886	−28	16
3	Real Betis Baloncesto B	9	6	3	667	629	+38	15
4	AD Plasencia Basket	9	6	3	687	652	+35	15
5	Jaén Paraíso Interior CB Martos	10	5	5	794	761	+33	15
6	Benahavís Costa del Sol	10	5	5	771	779	−8	15
7	Unicaja Andalucía B (Note: Relegations to Primera División were revoked due to the COVID-19 pandemic.)	10	5	5	716	734	−18	15
8	Rus CB Ciudad de Dos Hermanas	9	5	4	624	614	+10	14
9	Matenglish CB San Fernando	9	2	7	573	688	−115	11

Source: FEB

== Conference E ==
The Conference E consisted of 2 groups of eight and nine teams from Valencian Community and Murcia.

=== Teams ===
Team	Home city	Autonomous federation	Arena
Angels Visión UPB Gandia	Gandia	Valencian Community	Municipal
CB Ifach Calpe	Calp	Valencian Community	Municipal
CB Puerto Sagunto	Sagunto	Valencian Community	José Veral
CB Tabernes Blanques	Tavernes Blanques	Valencian Community	Municipal
Conciencia2s Valencia CB Aldaia	Aldaia	Valencian Community	Municipal
Guillén Group Alginet	Alginet	Valencian Community	Municipal
Hero Jairis	Alcantarilla	Murcia	Fausto Vicent
Picken Claret	Valencia	Valencian Community	Benimaclet
Power Electronics Paterna	Paterna	Valencian Community	Municipal
Refitel Bàsquet Llíria	Llíria	Valencian Community	Pla del Arc
Sha Wellness Clinic L'Alfàs	L'Alfàs del Pi	Valencian Community	Pau Gasol
Servigroup Benidorm	Benidorm	Valencian Community	Illa Benidorm
Sonia Bath Godella	Godella	Valencian Community	Municipal
UCAM Murcia Jiffy B	Murcia	Murcia	Palacio de Deportes
TAU Castelló B	Castellón de la Plana	Valencian Community	Ciutat de Castelló
UPCT Basket Cartagena	Cartagena	Murcia	El Albujón
Valencia Basket B	Valencia	Valencian Community	L'Alquería

=== Regular season ===
==== Group E–A ====
Pos	Team	Pld	W	L	PF	PA	PD	Pts	Qualification
1	Refitel Bàsquet Llíria	14	12	2	1112	874	+238	26	Qualification to promotion group
2	TAU Castelló B	14	11	3	1094	1040	+54	25	Qualification to promotion group
3	Valencia Basket B	14	10	4	1138	976	+162	24	Qualification to promotion group
4	Power Electronics Paterna	14	9	5	1102	1048	+54	23	Qualification to promotion group
5	CB Tabernes Blanques	14	5	9	988	1094	−106	19	Qualification to relegation group
6	Sonia Bath Godella	14	5	9	942	1016	−74	19	Qualification to relegation group
7	Picken Claret	14	3	11	1034	1113	−79	17	Qualification to relegation group
8	CB Puerto Sagunto	14	1	13	811	1060	−249	15	Qualification to relegation group

Source: FEB

==== Group E–B ====
Pos	Team	Pld	W	L	PF	PA	PD	Pts	Qualification
1	Guillén Group Alginet	16	15	1	1341	1194	+147	31	Qualification to promotion group
2	Angels Visión UPB Gandia	16	11	5	1361	1214	+147	27	Qualification to promotion group
3	Hero Jairis	16	11	5	1225	1089	+136	27	Qualification to promotion group
4	UCAM Murcia Jiffy B	16	11	5	1344	1192	+152	27	Qualification to promotion group
5	Servigroup Benidorm	16	7	9	1161	1228	−67	23	Qualification to relegation group
6	CB Ifach Calpe	16	6	10	1130	1234	−104	22	Qualification to relegation group
7	Sha Wellness Clinic L'Alfàs	16	5	11	1174	1268	−94	21	Qualification to relegation group
8	Conciencia2s Valencia CB Aldaia	16	5	11	1223	1336	−113	21	Qualification to relegation group
9	UPCT Basket Cartagena	16	1	15	1103	1307	−204	17	Qualification to relegation group

Source: FEB

=== Second stage ===
==== Promotion group ====
Pos	Team	Pld	W	L	PF	PA	PD	Pts	Promotion
1	Valencia Basket B	7	6	1	631	555	+76	13	
2	Hero Jairis	7	5	2	567	498	+69	12	Promotion to LEB Plata
3	TAU Castelló B	7	5	2	534	542	−8	12	
4	Power Electronics Paterna	7	3	4	533	551	−18	10	
5	UCAM Murcia Jiffy B	7	3	4	553	584	−31	10	
6	Angels Visión UPB Gandia	7	3	4	552	584	−32	10	
7	Guillén Group Alginet	7	2	5	515	565	−50	9	
8	Refitel Bàsquet Llíria	7	1	6	564	570	−6	8	

Source: FEB

==== Relegation group ====
Pos	Team	Pld	W	L	PF	PA	PD	Pts
1	Sonia Bath Godella	8	6	2	580	524	+56	14
2	Picken Claret	8	6	2	644	601	+43	14
3	Servigroup Benidorm	7	5	2	562	536	+26	12
4	CB Ifach Calpe	8	4	4	572	570	+2	12
5	CB Puerto Sagunto	8	3	5	554	556	−2	11
6	UPCT Basket Cartagena (Note: Relegations to Primera División were revoked due to the COVID-19 pandemic.)	8	3	5	580	606	−26	11
7	Conciencia2s Valencia CB Aldaia	8	3	5	528	562	−34	11
8	CB Tabernes Blanques	8	3	5	549	623	−74	11
9	Sha Wellness Clinic L'Alfàs	7	2	5	570	561	+9	9

Source: FEB
