= CB Villarrobledo =

- Nickname: Troyanos (Trojans)
- League: LEB Plata
- Founded: July 15, 1992; 32 years ago
- Arena: Pabellón del Barrio de los Pintores
- Location: Villarrobledo, Spain
- Team colors: Red and white
- President: José Luis Melero
- Head coach: Manuel Jiménez
- Website: cbvillarrobledo.es
Home	Away

Club Baloncesto Villarrobledo is a professional basketball club based in Villarrobledo, Castilla-La Mancha, that currently plays in LEB Plata, the third tier of Spanish basketball.

== History ==
Founded on 15 July 1992, CB Villarrobledo started playing its first years in the provincial league of Albacete, until promoting to Tercera Autonómica in 2002. After the dissolution of the league, in 2006 the club joined Segunda Autonómica, Spanish seventh tier and later promoted to Primera Autonómica.

In 2011, Villarrobledo achieves a new promotion, this time to Primera División, and one year later to Liga EBA.

In 2018, the club reaches the LEB Plata by winning the three games of the promotion stage played in Gandía.

== Head coaches ==
- José Joaquín Navarro 2006–2008
- Vicente Rodríguez 2008–2011
- Alfredo Gálvez 2011–2012
- Jordi Casas 2012–2013
- Boris Balibrea 2013–2015
- Manuel Jiménez 2015–

== Season by season ==
Season	Tier	Division	Pos.	W–L
2005–06	8	3ª Autonómica	2nd	8–4
2006–07	7	2ª Autonómica	11th (Note: Remained after the expansion of the league.)	4–16
2007–08	8	2ª Autonómica	2nd	19–4
2008–09	7	1ª Autonómica	7th	12–12
2009–10	6	1ª Autonómica	12th	7–13
2010–11	6	1ª Autonómica	5th	18–11
2011–12	6	1ª Autonómica	1st	23–1
2012–13	5	1ª División	1st	21–7
2013–14	4	Liga EBA	11th	13–17
2014–15	4	Liga EBA	7th	12–14
2015–16	4	Liga EBA	13th (Note: Remained in the league after its expansion.)	8–18
2016–17	4	Liga EBA	7th	16–14
2017–18	4	Liga EBA	3rd	26–7
2018–19	3	LEB Plata	4th	23–13
2019–20	3	LEB Plata	24th (Note: Season curtailed due to the COVID-19 pandemic.)	8–17

== Current roster ==
Note: Flags indicate national team eligibility at FIBA-sanctioned events. Players may hold other non-FIBA nationalities not displayed.

CB Villarrobledo roster
Players
Coaches

Pos.	No.	Nat.	Name	Ht.	Age
C	7	(Ghana)	Agbeko, Reggie	2.03 m (6 ft 8 in)	32 – 18 September 1992
SG	8	(Spain)	Cuéllar, David	1.97 m (6 ft 6 in)	27 – 8 September 1997
C	12	(Senegal)	Diene, Pa Mor	2.09 m (6 ft 10 in)	26 – 19 August 1998
C	15	(Senegal)	Dieng, El Hadji	2.06 m (6 ft 9 in)	28 – 6 October 1996
SG	31	(Dominican Republic)	Frías, Raúl	1.85 m (6 ft 1 in)	28 – 4 March 1997
PG	1	(Spain)	Mejía, David	1.79 m (5 ft 10 in)	24 – 8 April 2000
C	24	(Senegal)	Ndiaye, Serigne	2.04 m (6 ft 8 in)	26 – 28 June 1998
PG	9	(Spain)	Peris, Josep	1.92 m (6 ft 4 in)	24 – 6 August 2000
PG	21	(Spain)	Portugués, Joaquín	1.86 m (6 ft 1 in)	29 – 21 September 1995
SF	13	(Spain)	Sabatés, Guillem	1.96 m (6 ft 5 in)	28 – 10 May 1996
PF		(Kenya)	Gombe, Ronald	2.03 m (6 ft 8 in)	32 – 21 July 1992

Head coach

- (Spain) Manuel Jiménez

Legend

- (C) Team captain
- Injured
