= CB Tormes =

Spanish professional basketball club

- League: Liga EBA
- Founded: March 2000
- Arena: Pabellón de Würzburg
- Capacity: 3,000
- Location: Salamanca, Spain
- Team colors: Orange and black
Home	Away

Club Baloncesto Tormes is a Spanish professional basketball club based in Salamanca, Castile and León that currently plays in Liga EBA, the fourth tier of Spanish basketball.

== History ==
CB Tormes was founded in March 2000, after splitting from UD Santa Marta, that created the basketball section in 1998.

In their first half season as independent team, the club promoted to Liga EBA, where it played two seasons before resigning to the place in the league. In the second one, CB Tormes reached the last stage of the promotion playoffs to LEB Plata, but could not achieve the promotion after losing by 30 against CB Aracena.

During all its existence, the club was alternating Liga EBA and Primera División, always resigning to the first one by financial inability.

In the 2014–15 season, CB Tormes played a new promotion playoffs, but could not win the stage.

In 2018, CB Tormes signed a collaboration agreement with Liga ACB club Baloncesto Fuenlabrada for becoming their reserve team. With this agreement, the club could achieve one of the new places in LEB Plata, third tier, after its expansion from 16 to 24 teams. However, the club could not remain in the league and was relegated at the end of the season.

== Season by season ==
Season	Tier	Division	Pos.	W–L
2000–01	4	Liga EBA	6th	18–12
2001–02	4	Liga EBA	2nd	28–9
2002–03	5	1ª División	4th	16–10
2003–04	Did not enter any competition			
2004–05	5	1ª División	2nd	
2005–06	4	Liga EBA	11th (Note: Resigned to its place in Liga EBA.)	11–19
2006–07	Lower divisions			
2007–08	6	1ª Autonómica	1st	18–2
2008–09	5	1ª División	4th	17–7
2009–10	5	1ª División	5th	12–10
2010–11	5	1ª División	5th	14–8
2011–12	5	1ª División	1st	17–3
2012–13	4	Liga EBA	8th	10–12
2013–14	4	Liga EBA	5th	13–9
2014–15	4	Liga EBA	2nd	20–9
2015–16	5	1ª División	3rd	10–6
2016–17	5	1ª División	4th	10–5
2017–18	5	1ª División	2nd (Note: Achieved one of the places after the expansion of the LEB Plata.)	8–5
2018–19	3	LEB Plata	24th	8–26
2019–20	4	Liga EBA	7th	10–10
