= AD Cantbasket 04 =

Cantbasket 04
- Nickname: Cantbasket
- Leagues: Liga EBA
- Founded: 2004
- Arena: Palacio de Deportes de Santander (capacity: 6,000)
- Location: Santander, Cantabria, Spain
- Team colors: White and black
- President: Daniel López
- Head coach: Joaquín Romano
- Website: cantbasket.com
Home	Away

Agrupación Deportiva Cantbasket 04, also known as Cantbasket, is a basketball team based in Santander, Cantabria, Spain, who currently play in Liga EBA.

== History ==
AD Cantbasket 04, registered in the Sports Entities Registry of the Government of Cantabria, was founded in 2004 by two co-founders who began as basketball coaches at Colegio Altamira, located in Revilla, Camargo.

Step by step, Cantbasket was growing thanks to agreement with different schools of the city of Santander. After conducting an extraordinary groundwork for a decade, the board of directors decided to take a step further in its strong growth, and enrolls its first team in Liga EBA, fourth tier, taking advantage of the tenth anniversary of the club's foundation.

Cantbasket made its debut in the fourth tier on 19 October 2014, with a win in Logroño over the reserve team of CB Clavijo by 77–87. The team, managed by Benjamín Santos, started the season in the best way possible with seven consecutive wins that allowed them to lead the league table, earning possilities to play the promotion playoffs to LEB Plata. However, Cantbasket finished the season in the third position of the grupo A-A.

In the 2015–16 season, an injury of franchise player DeAngelo Hailey, during the pre-season, weakened the team in the first months and finished its second participation in Liga EBA in the seventh position of the group. In the third campaign in this league, the board of directors and coach staff carried out a deep renovation of the squad, creating a reserve team, whose average age was 22 years old, where the youth squad and players from Cantabria were protagonists.

Currently, Cantbasket is one of the largest sports entities in Cantabria, has men's teams in all school and federated categories. In 2009, Cantbasket 04 decided to create a new project, separating its masculine section from the feminine one, thus the CB Némesis was born, with the firm purpose of being a future academy for Cantabrian female players.

== Season by season ==
Season	Tier	Division	Pos.	W–L
2011–12	5	1ª División	4th	9–13
2012–13	5	1ª División	2nd	13–9
2013–14	5	1ª División	3rd (Note: Achieved a vacant berth in Liga EBA.)	10–5
2014–15	4	Liga EBA	3rd	17–9
2015–16	4	Liga EBA	7th	14–12
2016–17	4	Liga EBA	2nd	20–7
2017–18	4	Liga EBA	3rd	22–10
2018–19	4	Liga EBA	4th	18–8
2019–20	4	Liga EBA	2nd	15–7
