= Saski Baskonia B =

Baskonia B
- League: Tercera FEB
- Founded: 2000; 25 years ago
- Arena: Polideportivo Mendizorrotza
- Capacity: 2,603
- Location: Vitoria-Gasteiz, Spain
- Team colors: Red, blue and white
- Website: baskonia.com
Home	Away

Baskonia B is the reserve team of Baskonia. It currently plays in Tercera FEB, the fourth tier of Spanish basketball.

== History ==
In the 2000–01 season, it played in Liga EBA with Tiago Splitter as its most important player. In 2012, the team becomes to Fundación 5+11 from the agreement between the club and Deportivo Alavés, the main football club in Vitoria-Gasteiz. In 2016, the club requests to the FEB a place in the Spanish 2nd-tier level LEB Oro for the 2016–17 season. In 2017, the request of the club has been accepted by the FEB and the team will occupy a place in the Spanish 3rd-tier level LEB Plata for the 2017–18 season.

== Players ==
=== Current roster ===
Note: Flags indicate national team eligibility at FIBA-sanctioned events. Players may hold other non-FIBA nationalities not displayed.

Baskonia B roster
Players	Coaches
Pos. / No. / Nat. / Name / Ht. / Age	Head coach: Vacant; Legend: (C) Team captain; Injured

== Head coaches ==
- Jon Txakartegi 2017–2018
- Miguel Ángel Hoyo 2018–2021

== Season by season ==
Season	Tier	Division	Pos.	W–L
2000–01	4	Liga EBA	15th	9–21
2001–05	5	1ª División		
2005–06	5	1ª División	13th	20–10
2006–07	5	1ª División	3rd	20–6
2007–08	6	1ª División	6th	13–15
2008–09	6	1ª División	4th	20–8
2009–10	5	1ª División	15th	15–13
2010–11	5	1ª División	7th	16–12
2011–12	5	1ª División	7th	13–15
2012–13	5	1ª División	16th	2–28
2013–14	5	1ª División	9th	13–15
2014–15	5	1ª División	1st (Note: They could not promote to the league.)	22–4
2015–16	5	1ª División	3rd	18–10
2016–17	5	1ª División	1st (Note: Achieved a vacant berth in LEB Plata.)	23–3
2017–18	3	LEB Plata	10th	13–17
2018–19	3	LEB Plata	18th (Note: Swapped its place it with Círculo Gijón.)	15–19
2019–20	4	Liga EBA	8th (Note: Season curtailed due to the COVID-19 pandemic.)	11–11
