= CB Vic =

Spanish basketball club

Club Bàsquet Vic
- Leagues: Liga EBA
- Founded: 1957
- Arena: Pavelló Municipal Castell d'en Planes
- Location: Vic, Catalonia
- Team colors: Red and white
- President: Jordi Molas
- Championships: 1 LEB Plata Championship; 1 Copa LEB Plata
- Website: www.clubbasquetvic.cat
Home	Away

Club Bàsquet Vic is a Spanish basketball club based in Vic, Catalonia.

== History ==
The team arrived to the Spanish second league, the LEB Oro in the 2008–09 season, but renounced to play after selling the berth to CB Sant Josep. CB Vic played the next season in Liga EBA, division where they played during two seasons reaching the promotion playoffs to LEB Plata.

On 2011–12 season, the club renounces to its spot at Liga EBA and decided to play in one level lower: Copa Catalunya.

== Season by season ==
Season	Tier	Division	Pos.	W–L	Cup competitions	
1998–99	5	1ª Catalana	2nd			
1999–00	4	Copa Catalunya	1st			
2000–01	4	Liga EBA	11th	13–17		
2001–02	4	Liga EBA	9th	16–16		
2002–03	4	Liga EBA	14th	9–21		
2003–04	4	Liga EBA	1st	25–9		
2004–05	4	Liga EBA	2nd	26–9		
2005–06	3	LEB 2	8th	15–18		
2006–07	3	LEB 2	4th	27–17		
2007–08	3	LEB Plata	1st	27–7	Copa LEB Plata	C
2008–09	2	LEB Oro	12th (Note: Resigned to continue playing in LEB Oro.)	15–19		
2009–10	4	Liga EBA	3rd	18–10		
2010–11	4	Liga EBA	2nd (Note: Resigned to their place in Liga EBA.)	28–6		
2011–12	5	Copa Catalunya	12th	14–18		
2012–13	5	Copa Catalunya	14th (Note: Remained in the league after achieving a vacant berth.)	10–22		
2013–14	5	Copa Catalunya	8th	17–13		
2014–15	5	Copa Catalunya	8th	14–16		
2015–16	5	Copa Catalunya	5th	19–11		
2016–17	5	Copa Catalunya	3rd (Note: Achieved a vacant place in Liga EBA.)	21–9		
2017–18	4	Liga EBA	1st (Note: Achieved one of the places after the expansion of the LEB Plata.)	25–6		
2018–19	3	LEB Plata	22nd	11–23		
2019–20	4	Liga EBA	1st (Note: Resigned to promote.)	19–2		

== Notable players ==
- (Spain) Guillem Rubio
- (Spain) Rafa Martínez
- (Brazil) Rafael Hettsheimeir
- (Colombia) Juan Palacios
- (Dominican Republic) Eulis Báez

== Trophies and awards ==
=== Trophies ===
- LEB Plata: (1)
  - 2008
- Copa LEB Plata: (1)
  - 2008
