= CB Martorell =

BC Martorell Solvin
- Leagues: Liga EBA
- Founded: 1975
- Arena: Municipal
- Capacity: 2,000
- Location: Martorell, Spain
- Team colors: Blue and white
- Website: cbmartorell.cat
Home	Away

Club Bàsquet Martorell, also known as BC Martorell Solvin for sponsorship reasons, is a Spanish basketball team based in Martorell, Catalonia, that currently plays in Liga EBA.

== History ==
CB Martorell was founded in 1975 after several attempts to create a team in the city.

In 2014, after several failures in promotion play-offs, the club was admitted in Liga EBA thanks to an expansion of the Group C. One year later, Martorell signed a collaboration agreement with Liga ACB team Bàsquet Manresa.

Finally, on 22 May 2017, Martorell promoted to LEB Plata by winning the final stage played in Villaviciosa de Odón.

== Season by season ==
Season	Tier	Division	Pos.	W–L
2008–09	5	Copa Catalunya	1st	24–8
2009–10	5	Copa Catalunya	14th	13–20
2010–11	5	Copa Catalunya	11th	12–20
2011–12	5	Copa Catalunya	1st	27–5
2012–13	5	Copa Catalunya	5th	19–11
2013–14	5	Copa Catalunya	1st (Note: Achieved a vacant berth in Liga EBA.)	25–9
2014–15	4	Liga EBA	13th (Note: Remained in the league due to the expansion of the Group C.)	9–17
2015–16	4	Liga EBA	15th	12–16
2016–17	4	Liga EBA	1st	23–7
2017–18	3	LEB Plata	16th	6–24
2018–19	4	Liga EBA	8th	12–14
2019–20	4	Liga EBA	6th	12–8
