= La Puebla de Alfindén =

Coordinates: 41°38′02″N 0°44′53″W

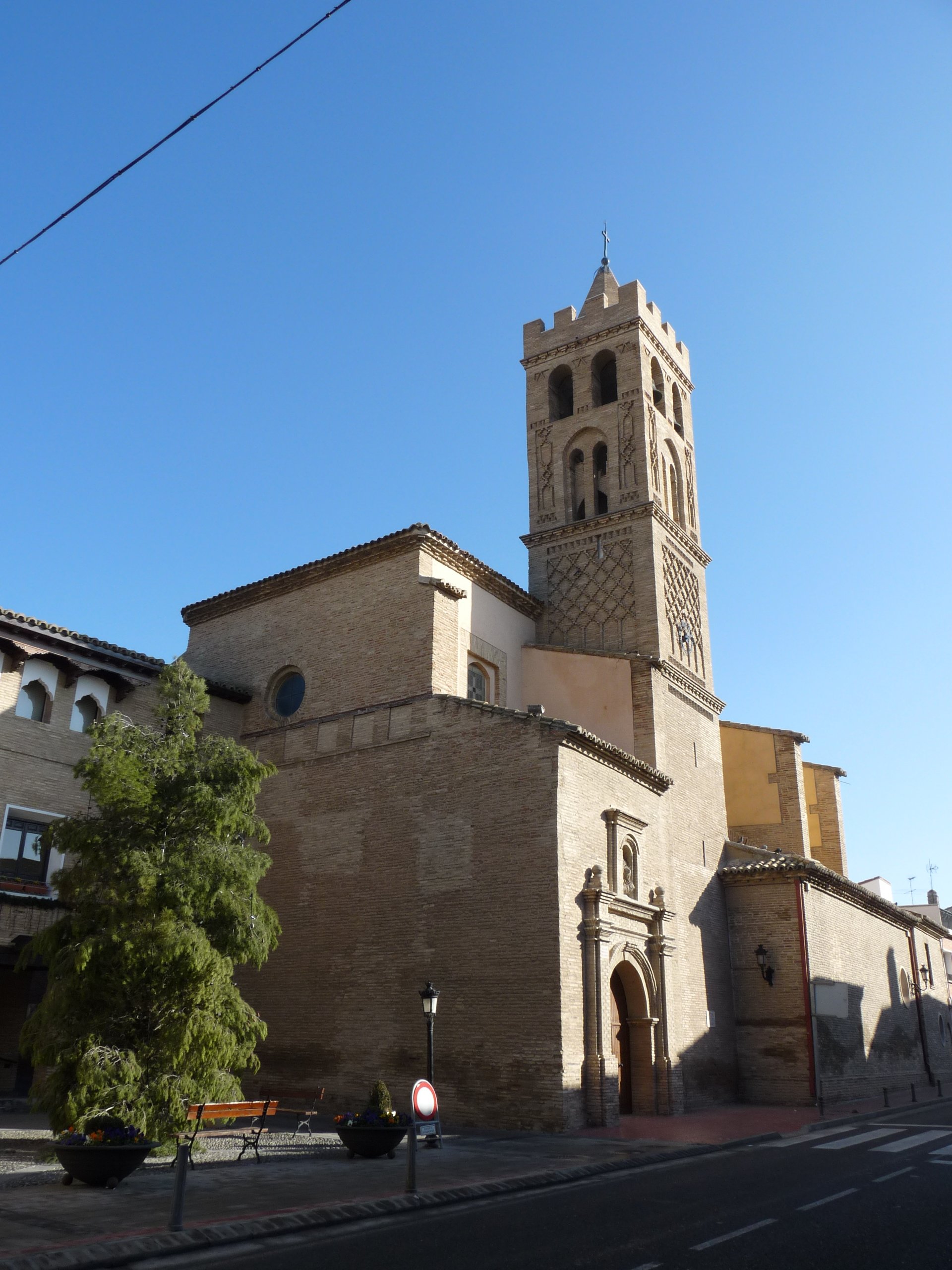

- Flag Coat of arms
- Interactive map of La Puebla de Alfindén
- Country: Spain
- Autonomous community: Aragon
- Province: Zaragoza
- Municipality: La Puebla de Alfindén

Area
  - Total: 16 km^{2} (6.2 sq mi)

Population (2025-01-01)
  - Total: 6,550
  - Density: 410/km^{2} (1,100/sq mi)
- Time zone: UTC+1 (CET)
  - Summer (DST): UTC+2 (CEST)

La Puebla de Alfindén is a municipality located in the province of Zaragoza, Aragon, Spain. According to the 2004 census (INE), the municipality has a population of 3,076 inhabitants.

== See also ==
- List of municipalities in Zaragoza
