= UPB Gandia =

- Leagues: LEB Plata
- Founded: 2013
- Arena: Pavelló Municipal de Gandia
- Capacity: 1,500
- Location: Gandia, Spain
- Team colors: Purple, black and white
- Website: basquetgandia.com
Home	Away

Units pel Bàsquet Gandia, also known as Hispagan UPB Gandia by sponsorship reasons, is a Spanish basketball club based in Gandia, Valencian Community, that currently plays in LEB Plata, the third tier of Spanish basketball.

== History ==
UPB Gandia was founded in 2013 with the aim to replace Gandia BA, that was dissolved in 2013 and achieved to play in LEB Oro during three seasons until its resign.

After three seasons in Liga EBA, the club achieves the promotion to LEB Plata in the 2015–16 season after winning the play-off stage played in Gandia.

== Sponsorship naming ==
- Hispagan UPB Gandia 2014–present

== Season by season ==
Season	Tier	Division	Pos.	W–L
2013–14	4	Liga EBA	2nd	24–7
2014–15	4	Liga EBA	4th	16–12
2015–16	4	Liga EBA	1st	25–4
2016–17	3	LEB Plata	16th	8–22
2017–18	4	Liga EBA	1st	22–8
2017–18	4	Liga EBA	1st	21–8
