= Pabellón =

Pabellón or Pabellon may refer to:

Places:

- Pabellón de Arteaga, city in the Mexican state of Aguascalientes
- Pabellón de Arteaga (municipality), municipality in the Mexican state of Aguascalientes
- Pabellon Island, the southernmost of two islands in the Melchior Islands, Palmer Archipelago

Food:

- Pabellón criollo, traditional Venezuelan dish, the local version of the rice and beans combination found throughout the Caribbean

Sports arenas:

- Pabellón Ciudad de Algeciras, arena in Algeciras, Spain
- Pabellón Menorca, arena in Menorca in the area of Binitaufa, Mahón, Spain
- Pabellón Multiusos Fontes Do Sar, multi-purpose sports arena in Santiago de Compostela, Galicia, Spain
- Pabellón Municipal de Deportes La Casilla, 5000-seat arena in Bilbao, Spain, primarily used for basketball
- Pabellón Municipal Rafael Florido, arena in Almería, Spain
- Pabellón Polideportivo Artaleku, arena in Irun, Spain
- Pabellón Polideportivo Ipurua, arena in Eibar, Spain
- Pabellón Polideportivo Municipal Fernando Argüelles, arena in Antequera, Spain
- Pabellón Polideportivo Pisuerga, arena in Valladolid, Spain
- Pabellón Universitario de Navarra, arena in Pamplona, Spain
- Pabellon Don Vasco, indoor arena located in Morelia, Michoacán, Mexico
- Pabellon Insular Santiago Martin, arena in Santa Cruz de Tenerife, Spain
- Pabellon Municipal Fuente San Luis, arena in Valencia, Spain
