= Center Stage (Atlanta) =

Music venue in Atlanta, United States

Coordinates: 33°47′32″N 84°23′17″W

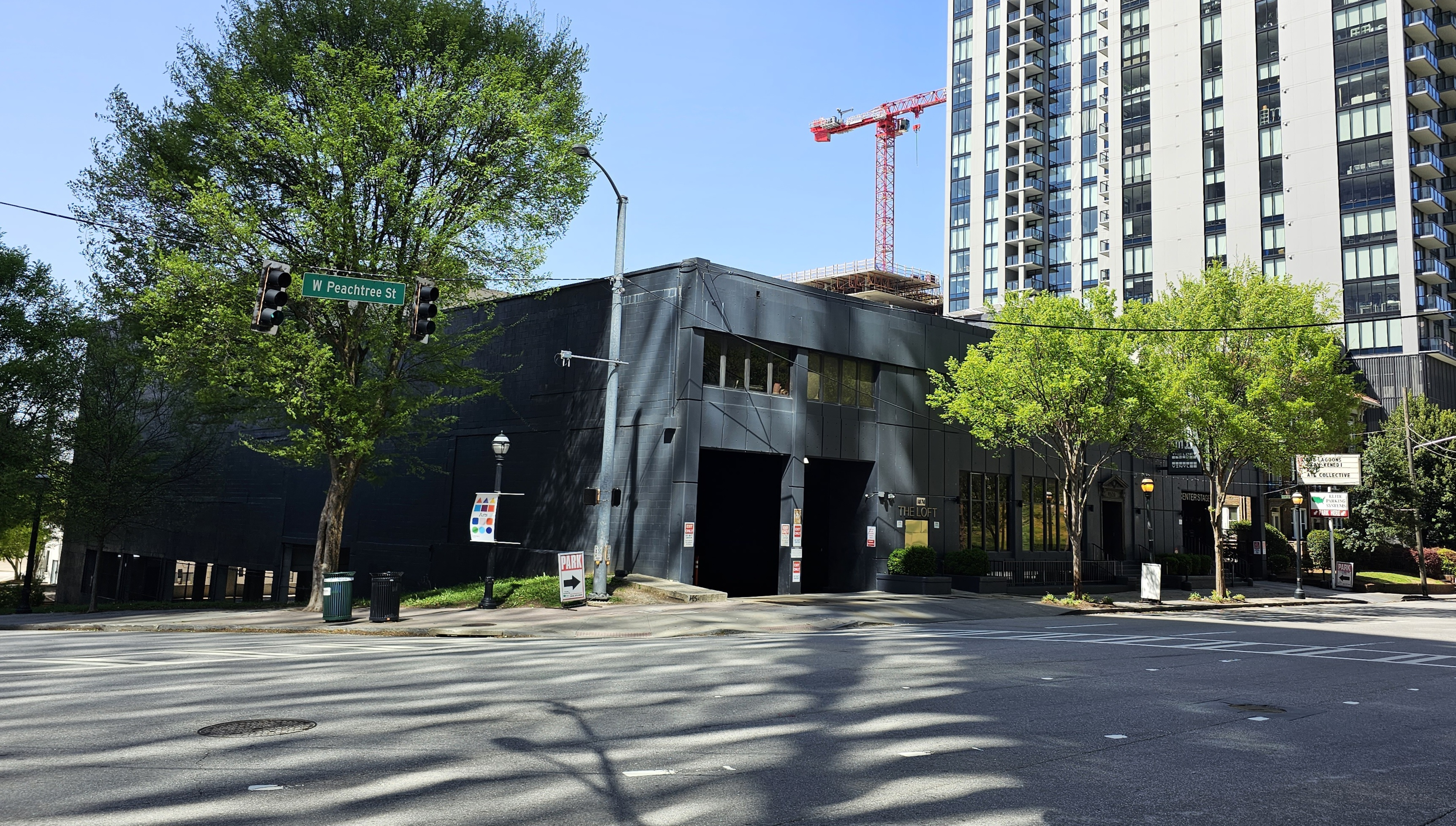
- Center Stage, 2023
- Interactive map of Center Stage
- Former names: Theatre Atlanta (1966–82); Center Stage (1982–2001; 2009–present); EarthLink Live (2001–06); The CW Midtown Music Complex (2007–09)
- Address: 1374 West Peachtree Street; Atlanta, Georgia; United States
- Location: Midtown
- Operator: Rival Entertainment
- Capacity: 1,050 (Center Stage Theater); 650 (The Loft); 300 (Vinyl)

Construction
- Opened: October 26, 1966

Website
- centerstage-atlanta.com

Center Stage is a three-venue live entertainment complex in the Midtown neighborhood of Atlanta, Georgia. The building opened on October 26, 1966, as Theatre Atlanta, a non-profit repertory theater built as a memorial to Helen Lee Cartledge, who died in the 1962 Orly air disaster. It was rebranded Center Stage in the early 1980s and has operated primarily as a music venue since, while also hosting comedy, professional wrestling, and television and film production.

The complex comprises three rooms under one roof: Center Stage Theater (capacity approximately 1,050), the largest and oldest of the three; The Loft (650), a standing-room space added in 2005; and Vinyl (300), the smallest room, focused on local and regional acts. Since 2009 all three have operated under the Center Stage name and have been run by Rival Entertainment, an independent Atlanta concert promotion company formed in 2004.

Beyond live music, the building has had a varied institutional history: it housed Atlanta's short-lived Video Music Channel in the early 1980s, served as the primary taping location for World Championship Wrestling's television programming from 1989 to 1992, and has hosted recording sessions, television specials, and an annual progressive-metal festival, ProgPower USA. WWE has used the venue periodically for NXT television tapings since 2018, including the 2025 Great American Bash premium live event.

== History ==
=== Theatre Atlanta (1957–1982) ===
The Theatre Atlanta company was founded in 1957 as a professional repertory troupe. Its dedicated home at 1374 West Peachtree Street was financed largely by Frania Tye Lee as a memorial to her daughter, Helen Lee Cartledge, who served as the first president of the company's Women's Guild. Cartledge died, along with her husband, in the crash of Air France Flight 007 at Orly Airport near Paris on June 3, 1962, one of 130 people killed; 106 of the victims were members of the Atlanta Art Association, who were returning from a month-long, association-sponsored tour of European art collections.

Lee, born Frania Tye, had entered into a marriage with the Texas oil magnate Haroldson Lafayette "H. L." Hunt in 1925, while Hunt remained married to his first wife; litigation following Hunt's 1974 death later confirmed that the marriage had not been legally valid. Hunt had nonetheless established trust funds for his children with Tye, including Cartledge, and Tye—who afterward took the surname Lee through a separate marriage—drew on those funds to help underwrite the cost of the Theatre Atlanta building.

The theater opened on October 26, 1966, with a production of The Royal Hunt of the Sun. As built, it seated 775 around a 130-foot, wing-to-wing, 68-foot thrust stage. The building also housed a triple-tier parking garage that remains in use, along with a restaurant, cocktail lounges, a costume-design workshop, and classroom space for the Theatre Atlanta Institute of Speech and Voice.

=== Center Stage and ownership changes (1982–2009) ===
Theatre Atlanta's theatrical programming wound down in the early 1980s, and the building was rebranded Center Stage. From July 1982 until 1985, its basement housed The Video Music Channel, a low-budget local cable station that briefly expanded to broadcast on channel 69 before folding.

From 1989 to 1992, the venue—by then commonly known as the Center Stage Theater—served as the principal taping location for World Championship Wrestling's weekly program, which had previously been recorded at WTBS's studios at the Turner Broadcasting Techwood Campus; the move took place in March 1989. On September 2, 1992, the venue hosted Clash of the Champions XX: 20th Anniversary, a live televised supercard marking both the 20th Clash of the Champions event and the 20th anniversary of professional wrestling broadcasts on TBS. The flagship program was renamed WCW Saturday Night that April.

In 2000, Atlanta attorney and restaurateur Thomas Cook acquired the venue and, under a sponsorship agreement, renamed it EarthLink Live the following year. Under Cook's ownership, two additional rooms were built into the same building: Vinyl, a 300-capacity room that opened in 2002, and The Loft, a 650-capacity standing-room space overlooking the Midtown skyline that opened in February 2005. (Note: A 2025 Atlanta Journal-Constitution retrospective instead credits the buildout of Vinyl and The Loft to Rival Entertainment shortly after its 2004 founding, dating them to 2004 and 2006 respectively. This article follows the dates given in contemporaneous 2006 trade-press coverage.)

In 2004, Cook recruited event producer Josh Antenucci and talent buyer Lucy Lawler-Freas—who had learned the concert-promotion trade under longtime Atlanta promoters Alex Cooley and Peter Conlon—to form Rival Entertainment, an independent promotion and venue-management company built around Center Stage's three rooms. In 2006, Elton John rented Center Stage Theater for two months to record his studio album The Captain & the Kid, and the venue also hosted an early-morning promotional concert by Jay-Z that year. EarthLink's five-year naming-rights agreement expired that same year, and the venue reverted to the Center Stage name on June 1, 2006. In 2007, The CW Television Network's Atlanta affiliate WUPA entered a promotional sponsorship with Rival Entertainment under which the building was renamed The CW Midtown Music Complex. That sponsorship ended in early 2009, and the complex returned to the Center Stage name under Rival Entertainment's management, which has continued since.

=== Rival Entertainment era (2009–present) ===
Under Rival Entertainment, Center Stage has hosted Atlanta debut concerts by Kanye West and Twenty One Pilots, among others. Lady Gaga and Katy Perry each performed at The Loft within the same week in 2009, and Duran Duran played three sold-out nights at Center Stage Theater in 2011. More recent shows at The Loft have included Teddy Swims (2020) and Chappell Roan (2023).

The venue has also continued to host professional wrestling on an occasional basis. WWE held tapings of its developmental program NXT there in January and February 2018, returned for a live NXT broadcast on January 28, 2025, and hosted NXT The Great American Bash on July 12, 2025—the first time the long-running Great American Bash event had returned to Georgia since 1992. Smaller promotions have also presented recurring shows at the venue, including Ring of Honor, the United Wrestling Network through their Championship Wrestling from Atlanta territory, the National Wrestling Alliance, Major League Wrestling, TNA Wrestling (Impact Wrestling), Game Changer Wrestling, and the Nightmare Factory.

== Venues ==
All three rooms within the complex book live music, comedy, and other touring entertainment, and the building's structure—described by Rival Entertainment co-founder Lucy Lawler-Freas as "built like a bomb shelter"—allows simultaneous shows in different rooms without sound bleeding between them.

=== Center Stage Theater ===
Center Stage Theater is the complex's original and largest room, with a capacity of approximately 1,050. Most shows there are general admission and standing-room, with reserved seating offered for select performances. Tickets are sold through Ticketmaster.

=== The Loft ===
The Loft opened in February 2005 on the complex's second floor and is a standing-room-only venue with a capacity of 650 and views of the Midtown skyline. Its operator describes the room's design as industrial in style. Like Center Stage Theater, it is ticketed through Ticketmaster.

=== Vinyl ===
Vinyl, the smallest of the three rooms, opened in 2002 with a capacity of 300. It is primarily a standing-room venue that focuses on local and regional acts. In 2010, it was named "Best Live Music" venue on AOL's list of Atlanta's top spots. Vinyl is ticketed separately through Ticket Alternative.

== Programming ==
=== Festivals ===
Center Stage has hosted ProgPower USA, an annual progressive- and power-metal festival, since the festival relocated to Atlanta from the Chicago area in late 2001; as of 2026 the event continues to be held at the venue each September.

=== Recordings and filming ===
Beyond Elton John's 2006 sessions for The Captain & the Kid, Center Stage was used from 2004 to 2006 to film Laffapalooza, a comedy special starring Jamie Foxx for broadcast on Comedy Central. Nick Cannon's Wild 'n Out was filmed at the venue across three seasons between 2018 and 2020.

== See also ==
- Fox Theatre (Atlanta)
- The Tabernacle
- Music of Atlanta
- List of music venues in North America
