= List of music venues in North America =

This is a list of music venues in North America. Venues with a capacity of 1,000 or higher are included.

== List ==
=== The Bahamas ===
Opened	Venue	City	Capacity
Unknown	Imperial Ballroom	Nassau	2,500

=== Barbados ===
Opened	Venue	City	Capacity
November 1992	Garfield Sobers Gymnasium	Bridgetown	5,000
1882	Kensington Oval	Bridgetown	28,000

=== Costa Rica ===
Opened	Venue	City	Capacity
2015	Imperial Amphitheater	Alajuela	16,000
2015	Centrokölbi	Alajuela	9,000
1990	Palacio de los Deportes	Heredia	7,500
August 27, 1972	Estadio Ricardo Saprissa Aymá	San Jose	23,112
March 26, 2011	Estadio Nacional de Costa Rica	San Jose	35,175

=== Dominican Republic ===
Opened	Venue	City	Capacity
2016	Hard Rock Live	Santo Domingo	1,500
1942	Teatro La Fiesta	Santo Domingo	1,206
1977	Eduardo Brito National Theater	Santo Domingo	1,539
1974	Pabellón de Volleyball	Santo Domingo	4,000
1987	Ovalo Feria Ganadera	Santo Domingo	3,000
2005	Sans Souci Convention Center	Santo Domingo	8,000
1996	Teo Cruz Coliseum	Santo Domingo	6,300
1974	Palacio de los Deportes Virgilio Travieso Soto	Santo Domingo	7,300
2025	Arena Santo Domingo	Santo Domingo	12,000
1502–1508	Fortaleza Ozama	Santo Domingo	12,000
October 23, 1955	Estadio Quisqueya	Santo Domingo	25,000+
1974	Estadio Olímpico Félix Sánchez	Santo Domingo	50,000
1995	Gran Teatro del Cibao	Santiago de los Caballeros	1,678
1986	Gran Arena del Cibao	Santiago de los Caballeros	6,650
2018	Santiago Central Park	Santiago de los Caballeros	5,000
2020	UTESA Convention Center	Santiago de los Caballeros	1,200
October 25, 1958	Estadio Cibao	Santiago de los Caballeros	18,000
October 6, 2023	The Legend Arena Amphtitheater	Punta Cana	2,600
2017	Blue Mall Punta Cana Amphitheater	Punta Cana	3,000
March 2010	Golf Club at Cana Bay	Punta Cana	12,000
Unknown	Fillmore Room	Punta Cana	3,960
2017	Anfiteatro La Puntilla	Puerto Plata	4,000
1982	Altos De Chavon	La Romana	5,500
2003	Estadio Olimpico El Condor	La Vega	7,000

=== El Salvador ===
Opened	Venue	City	Capacity
1956	Gimnasio Nacional	San Salvador	12,500
1932	Estadio Jorge "Mágico" González	San Salvador	30,000
July 24, 1976	Estadio Cuscatlán	San Salvador	53,400

=== Guatemala ===
Opened	Venue	City	Capacity
1991	Estadio Cementos Progreso	Guatemala City	17,000
Unknown	Paseo Cayala	Guatemala City	13,750
Unknown	Explanada Cardales de Cayalá	Guatemala City	25,000

=== Honduras ===
Opened	Venue	City	Capacity
1997	Ingenieros Coliseum	Tegucigalpa	7,500
1989	Estadio Chochi Sosa	Tegucigalpa	13,000
1991	Estadio Tiburcio Carías Andino	Tegucigalpa	34,000
1938	Estadio General Francisco Morazán	San Pedro Sula	18,000
1997	Estadio Olímpico Metropolitano	San Pedro Sula	37,325

=== Mexico ===
Opened	Venue	City	Capacity
Aguascalientes (AS)
July 26, 2003	Estadio Victoria	Aguascalientes	23,933
Baja California (BC)
November 11, 2007	Estadio Caliente	Tijuana	27,333
1970s	Auditorio Fausto Gutierrez Moreno	Tijuana	4,881
June 26, 1960	Bullring by the Sea	Tijuana	21,621
Unknown	Centro de Ferias, Eventos y Exposiciones	Mexicali	20,000
Unknown	Foro Promocasa	Mexicali	5,384
Chiapas (CS)
1982	Estadio Víctor Manuel Reyna	Tuxtla Gutiérrez	23,508
Chihuahua
2007	Estadio Olímpico Universitario José Reyes Baeza	Chihuahua	22,000
Coahuila
February 8, 2008	Coliseo Centenario	Torreón	12,000
September 14, 2011	Estadio Corona	Torreón	29,327
Mexico City
February 25, 2012	Arena Ciudad de México	Mexico City	22,300
1993	Foro Sol	Mexico City	63,500
May 29, 1966	Estadio Azteca	Mexico City	87,523
September 14, 2011	El Plaza Condesa	Mexico City	1,900
2012	Pepsi Center WTC	Mexico City	3,342
1952	Auditorio Nacional	Mexico City	10,000
1968	Palacio de los Deportes	Mexico City	26,000
1940s	Hipódromo de las Américas	Mexico City	20,000
January 5, 1947	Estadio Ciudad de los Deportes	Mexico City	36,681
December 18, 1996	Teatro Metropólitan	Mexico City	3,165
February 5, 1946	Plaza de Toros México	Mexico City	41,262
November 20, 1952	Estadio Olímpico Universitario	Mexico City	58,155
November 10, 1993	Estadio GNP Seguros	Mexico City	65,000
May 29, 1966	Estadio Banorte	Mexico City	87,523
November 20, 1959	Autódromo Hermanos Rodríguez	Mexico City	110,000
1524	Zócalo	Mexico City	~400,000
Estado de México
August 18, 1954	Estadio Nemesio Díez	Toluca	22,000
Guanajuato
Unknown	Explanada Poliforum	Léon	13,000
1980s	Domo de la Feria	Léon	7,000
March 1, 1967	Estadio León	Léon	27,423
2005	INFORUM Pavilion	Irapuato	6,000
2005	INFORUM Forum Abierto	Irapuato	3,000
Guerrero (GR)
2005	Forum de Mundo Imperial	Acapulco	4,000
Hidalgo (HG)
January 14, 1993	Estadio Hidalgo	Pachuca	27,512
Jalisco (JC)
December 23, 2008	Arena VFG	Guadalajara	14,999
January 31, 1960	Estadio Jalisco	Guadalajara	63,163
February 2005	Teatro Diana	Guadalajara	2,345
July 30, 2010	Estadio Akron	Zapopan	49,850
November 21, 1970	Auditorio Benito Juárez	Zapopan	13,000
September 1, 2007	Auditorio Telmex	Zapopan	16,000
October 2011	Estadio Telmex	Zapopan	15,000
1971	Estadio Tres de Marzo	Zapopan	30,015
Michoacán
March 2, 1952	Plaza Monumental de Morelia	Morelia	15,000
2007	Pabellon Don Vasco	Morelia	9,000
April 9, 1989	Estadio Morelos	Morelia	35,000
Nuevo León (NL)
1994	Auditorio Citibanamex	Monterrey	10,320
November 27, 2003	Arena Monterrey	Monterrey	17,999
July 13, 1990	Estadio Mobil Super	Monterrey	21,906
August 2, 2015	Estadio BBVA	Monterrey	51,000
February 24, 2001	Fundidora Park	Monterrey	100,000
May 30, 1967	Estadio Universitario	San Nicolás de los Garza	41,650
Puebla (PL)
June 16, 1973	Estadio de Béisbol Hermanos Serdán	Puebla	12,112
October 8, 1968	Estadio Cuauhtémoc	Puebla	50,754
Unknown	Auditorio del CCU	Puebla	10,792
January 2005	Auditorio Siglo XXI	Puebla	5,000
Querétaro (QE)
February 5, 1985	Estadio Corregidora	Querétaro	34,045
February 5, 1985	Auditorio Josefa Ortiz	Querétaro	4,749
Quintana Roo
2007	Estadio Andrés Quintana Roo	Cancún	18,844
1991	Autodromo Internacional de Cancún	Cancún	30,000
San Luis Potosí (SL)
2010	El Domo	San Luis Potosí	11,000
Sinaloa (SN)
August 9, 2003	Estadio Banorte	Culiacán	17,898
Sonora (SR)
2009	Arena ITSON	Ciudad Obregón	7,464
2010	Expo Forum	Hermosillo	10,807
1985	Estadio Héroe de Nacozari	Hermosillo	21,175
Tamaulipas (TM)
Unknown	Expo Tampico	Tampico	11,300
Veracruz (VZ)
1970s	Auditorio Benito Juárez	Veracruz	4,500
1989	World Trade Center	Veracruz	11,000
March 17, 1967	Estadio de la Fuente	Veracruz	28,703
Yucatán (YU)
1987	Estadio Carlos Iturralde	Mérida	15,087
2000	Siglo XXI	Mérida	12,000

=== Nicaragua ===
Opened	Venue	City	Capacity
April 14, 2011	Estadio Nacional de Fútbol	Managua	22,000

=== Panama ===
Opened	Venue	City	Capacity
2008	Teatro Anayassi	Panama City	2,800
2003	Figali Convention Center	Panama City	25,000
October 10, 1999	Estadio Nacional Rod Carew	Panama City	27,000
February 6, 1970	Estadio Rommel Fernández	Panama City	32,000

== Gallery ==
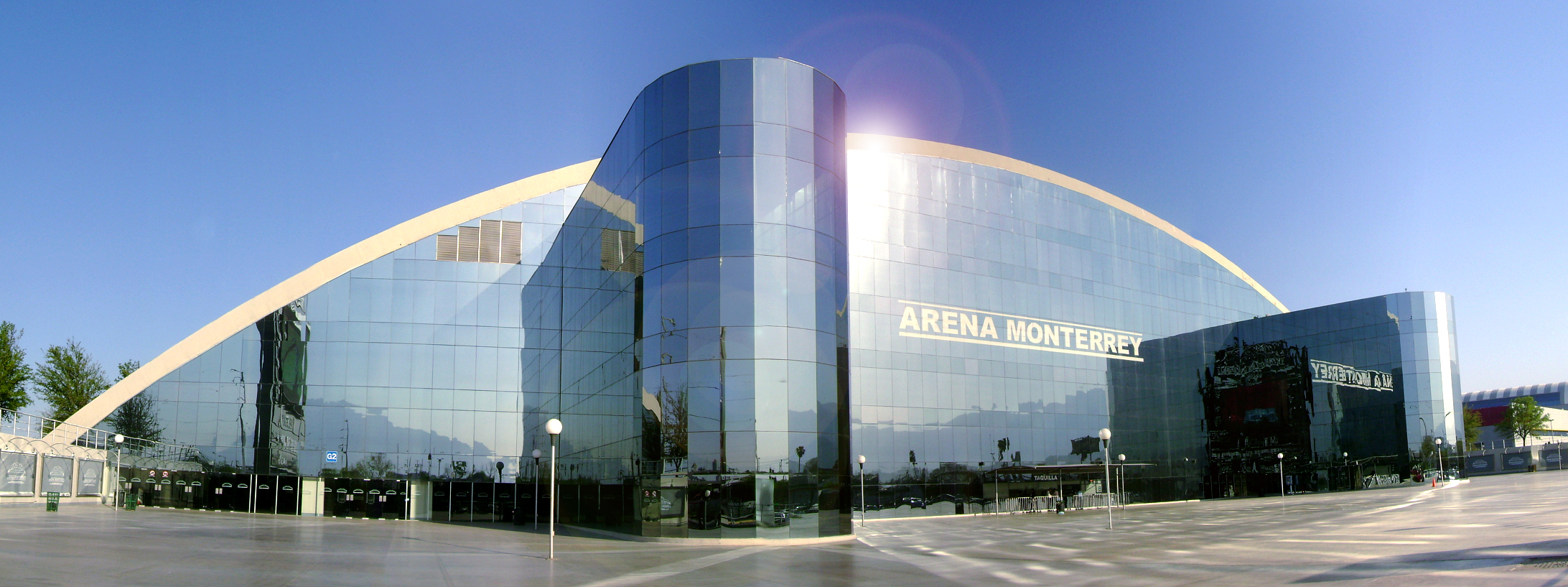
Arena Monterrey

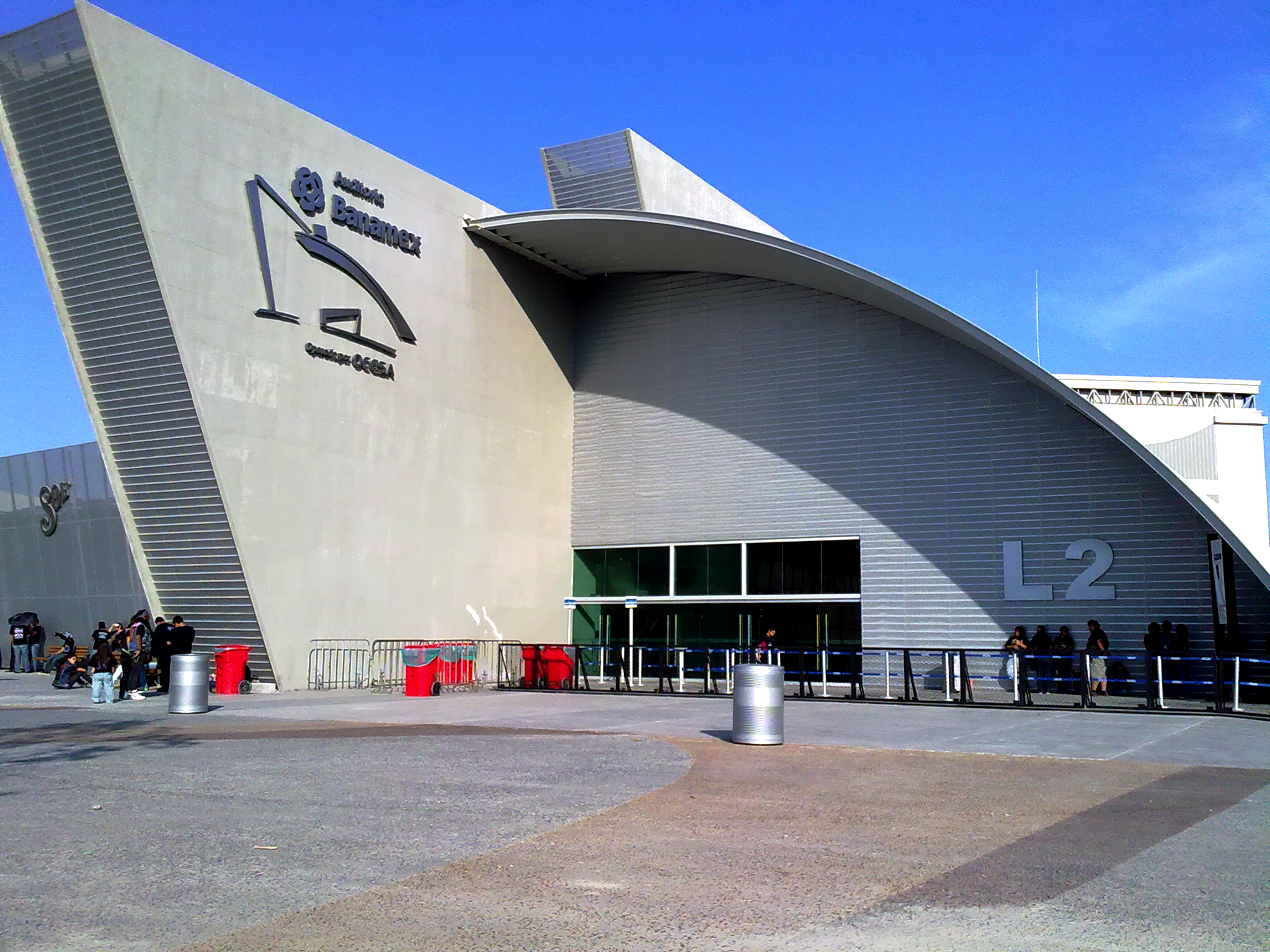
Auditorio Citibanamex

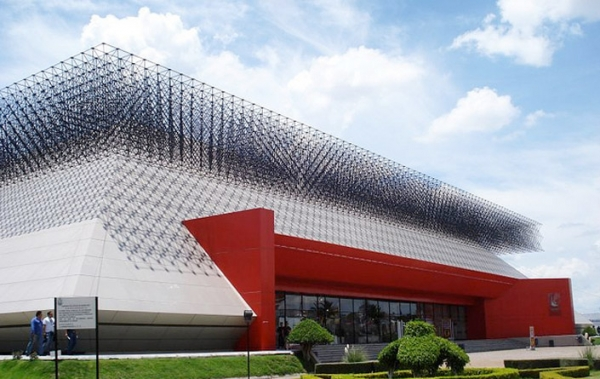
Auditorio Josefa Ortiz de Domínguez

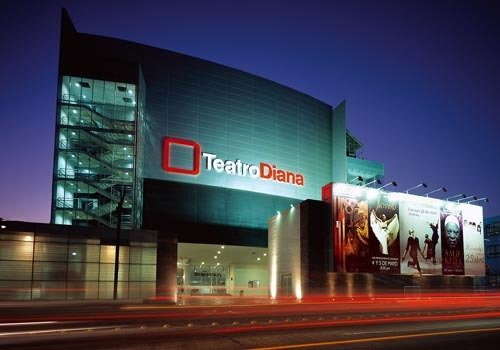
Diana Theatre

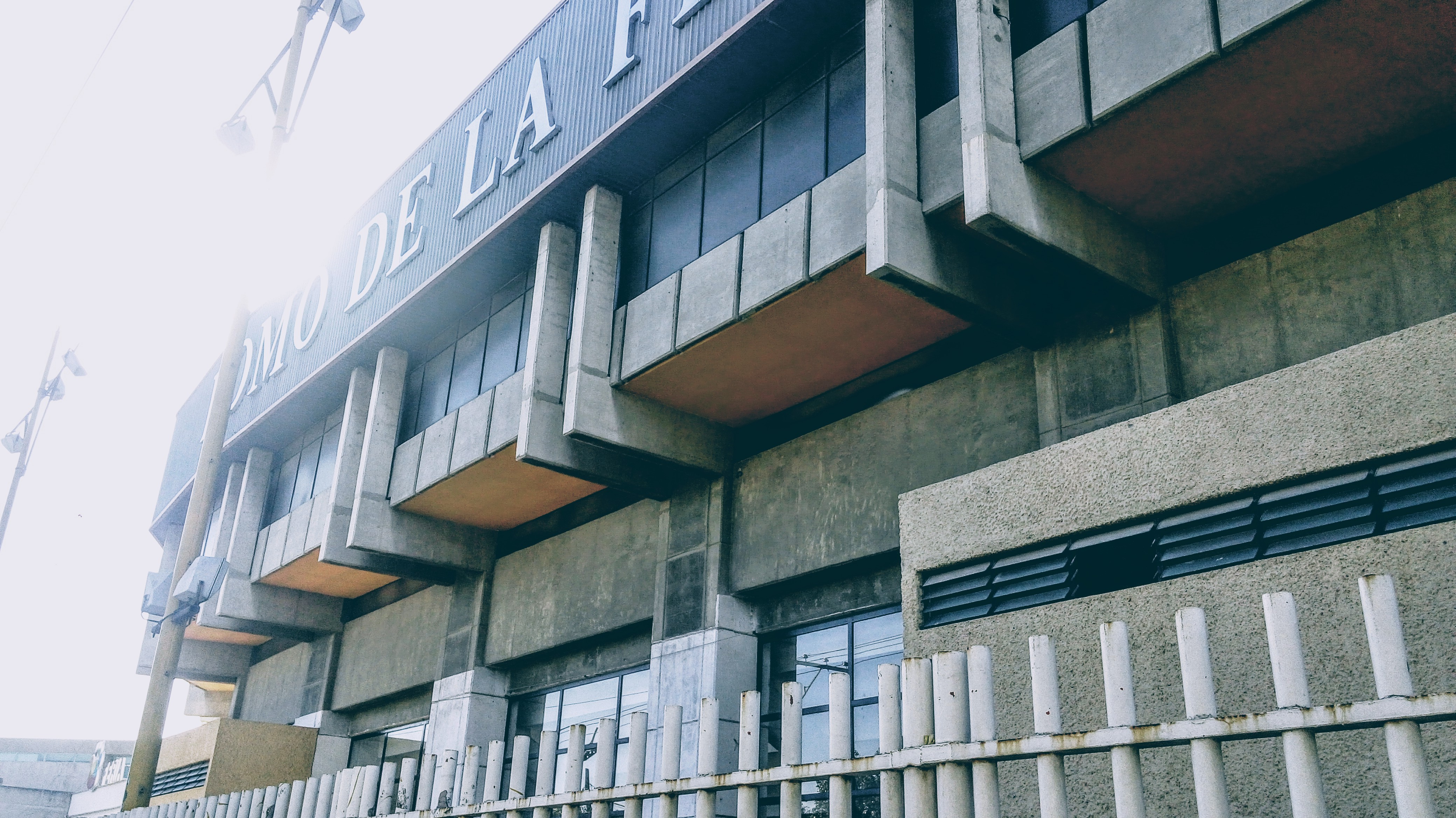
Domo de la Feria

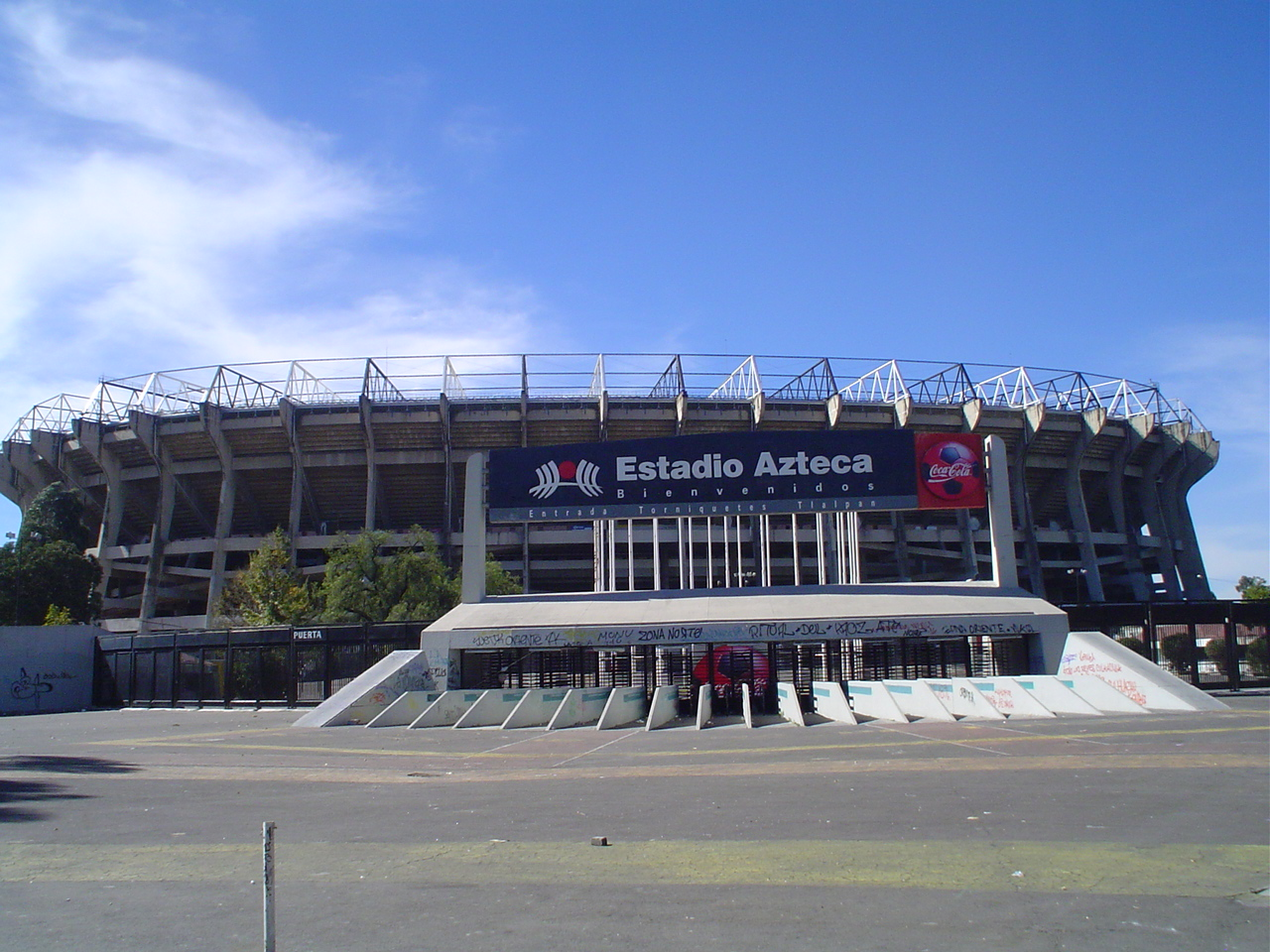
Estadio Azteca

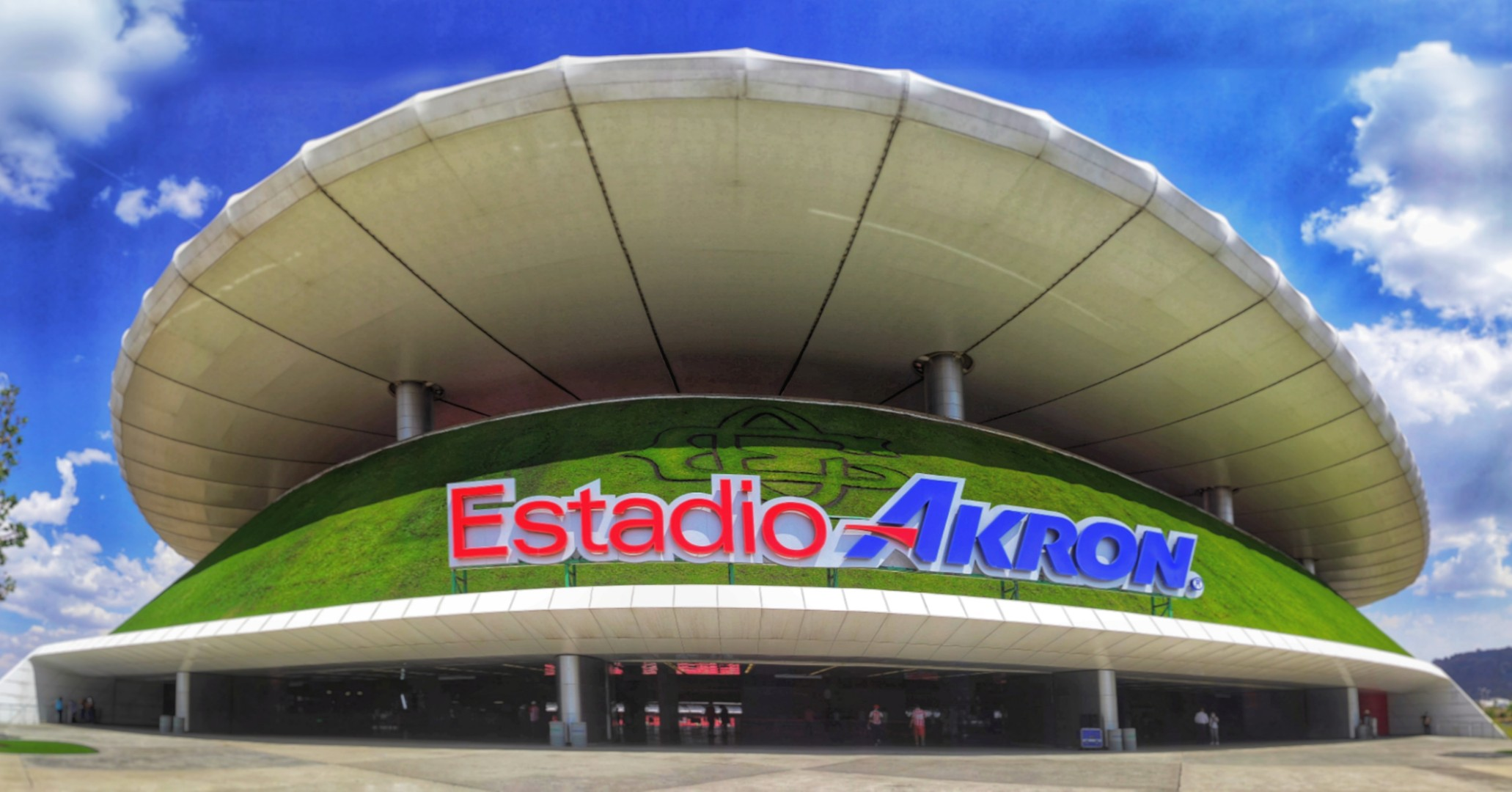
Estadio Akron

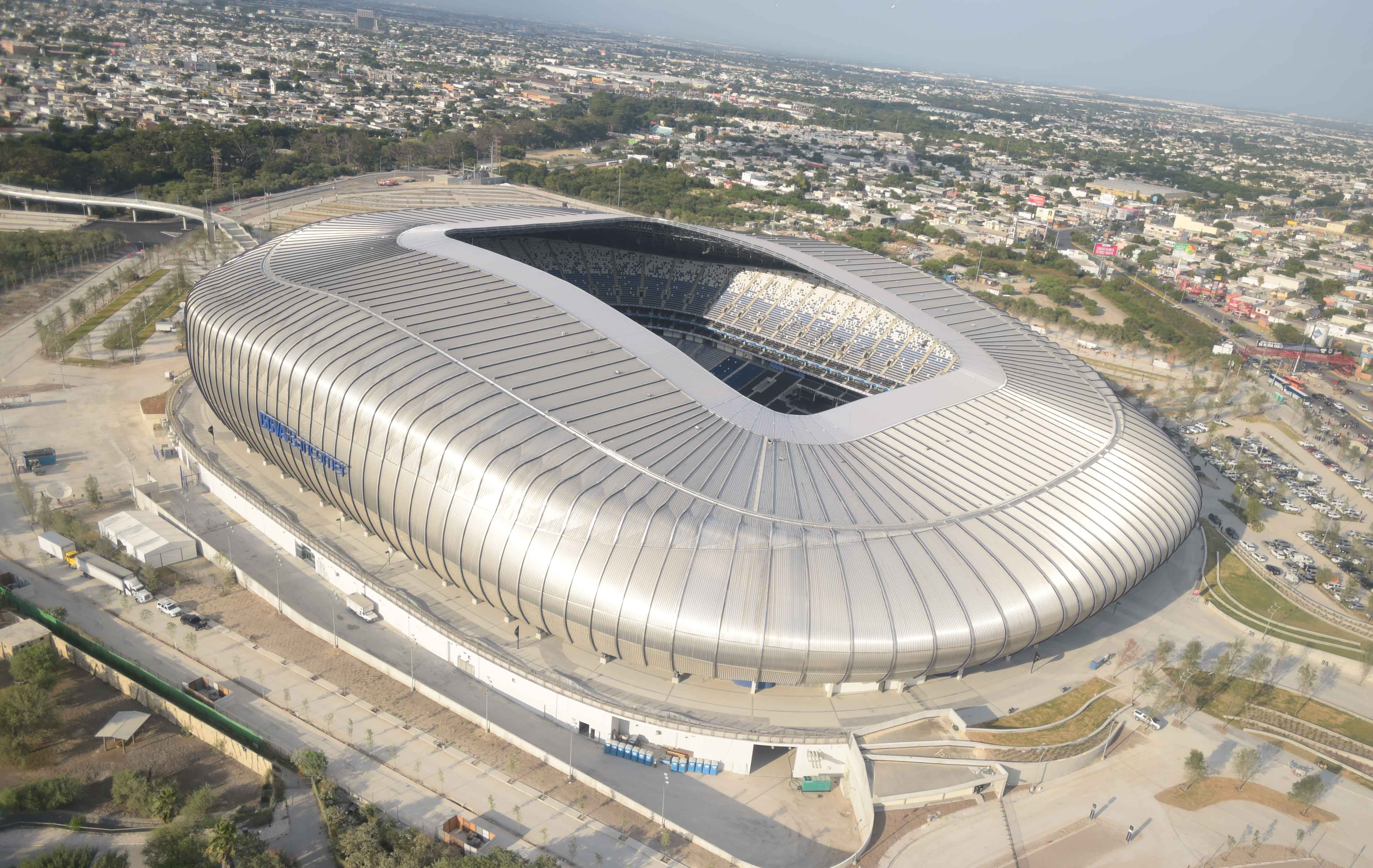
Estadio BBVA

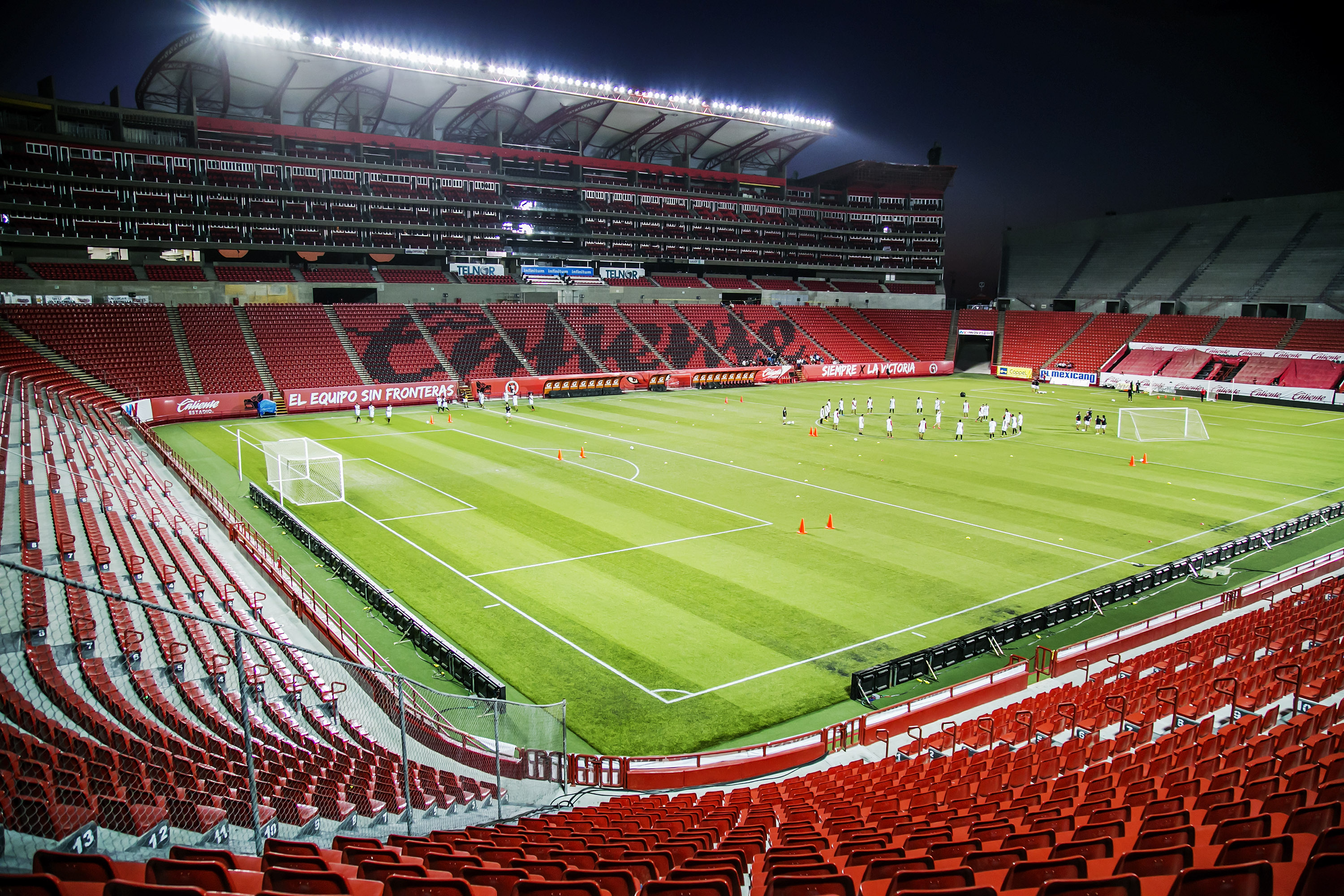
Estadio Caliente

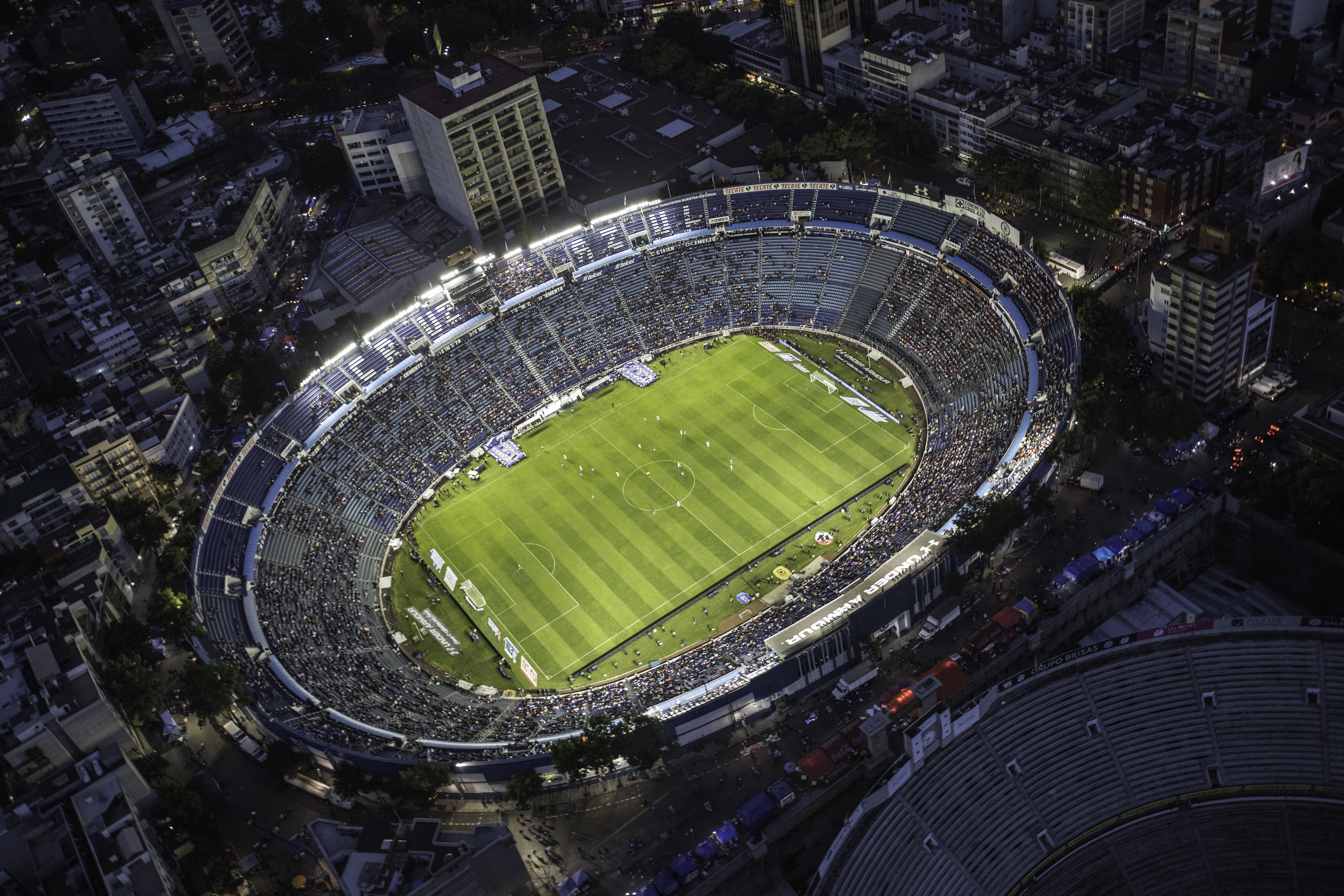
Estadio Ciudad de los Deportes

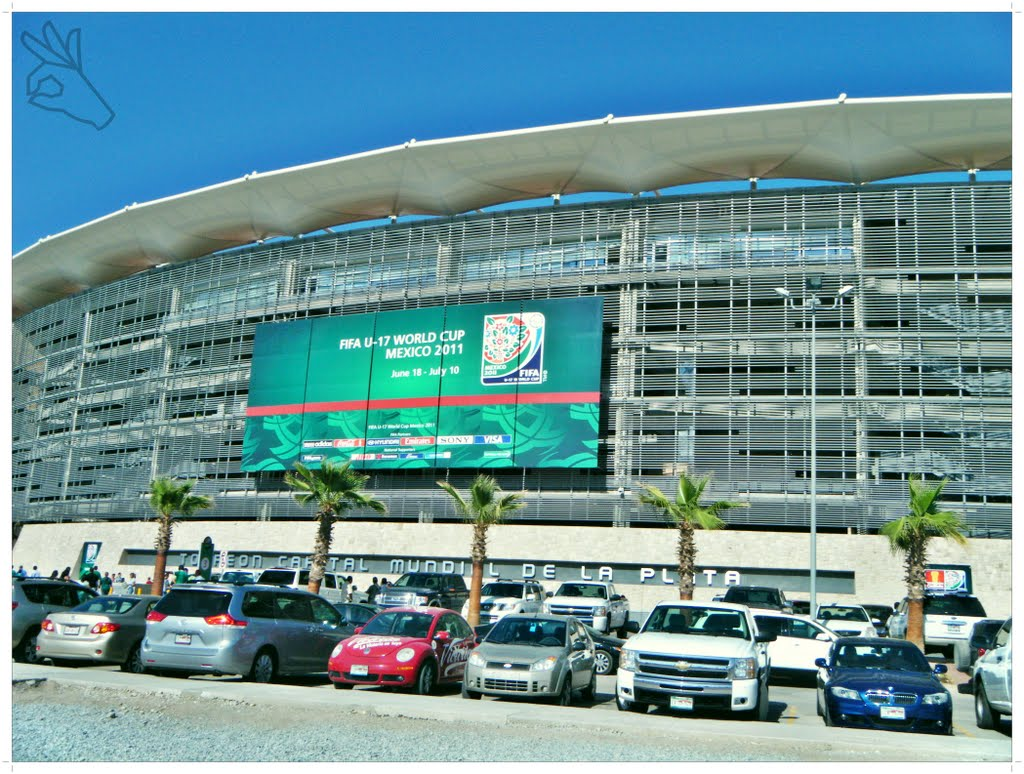
Estadio Corona

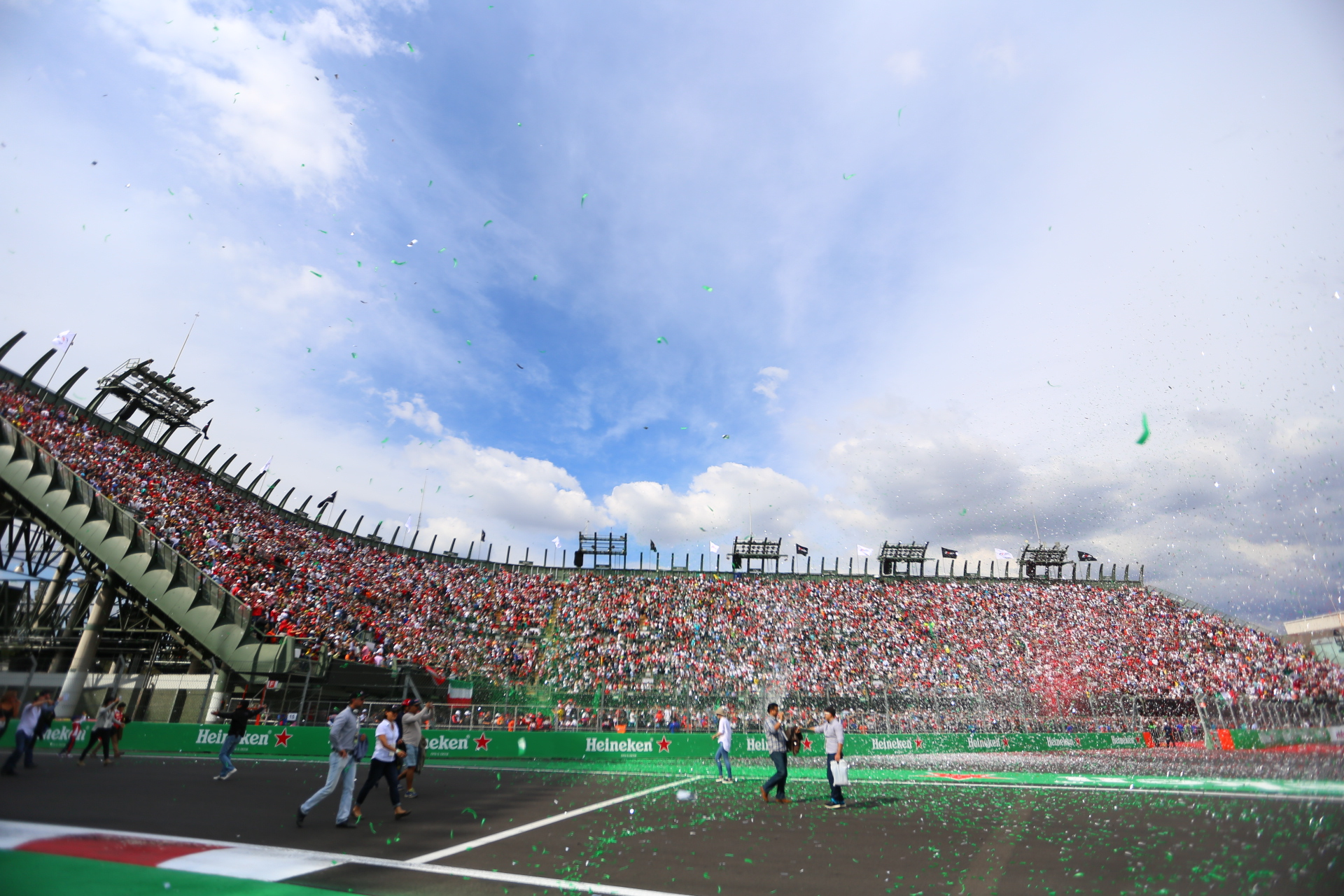
Estadio GNP Seguros

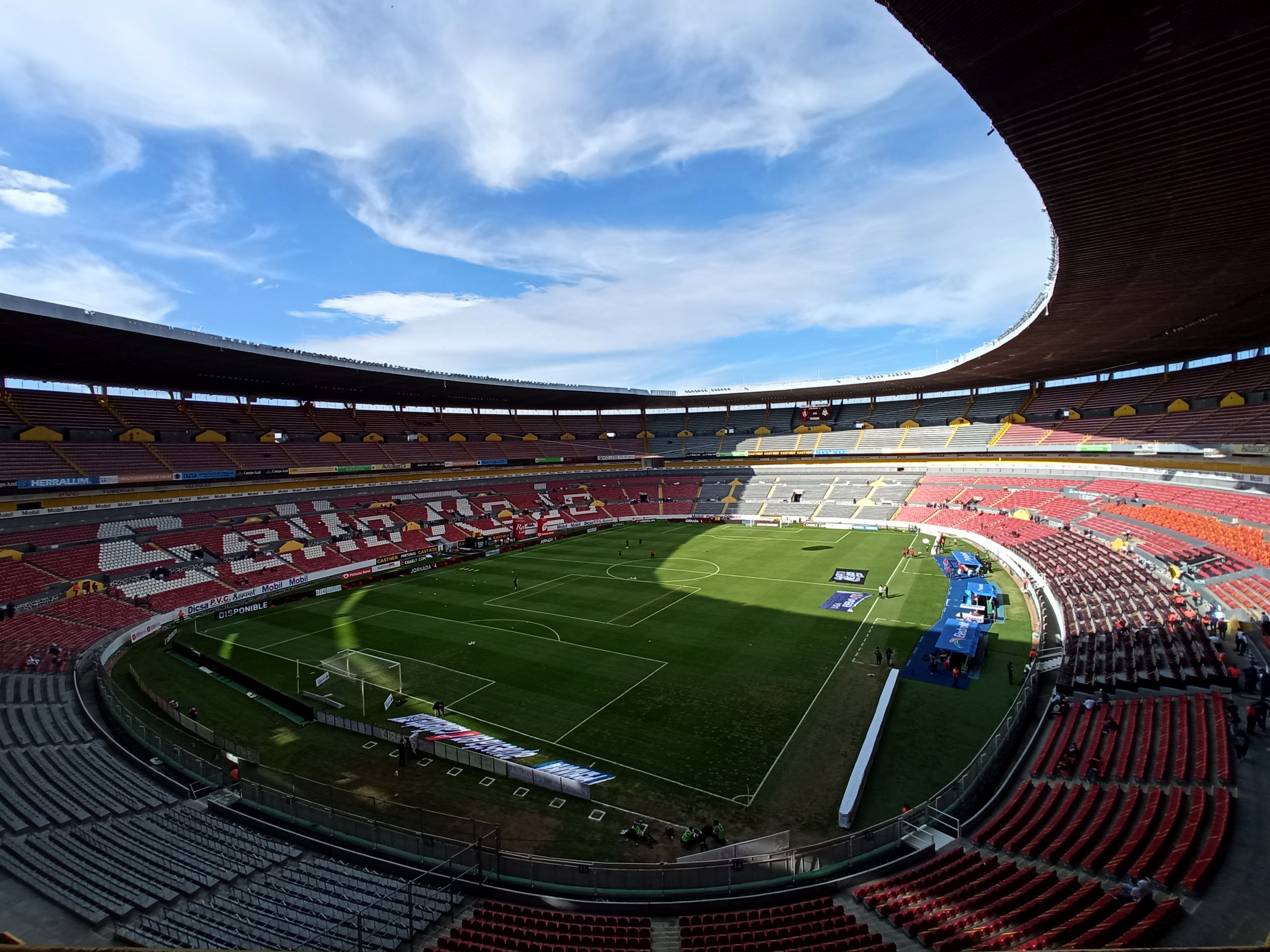
Estadio Jalisco

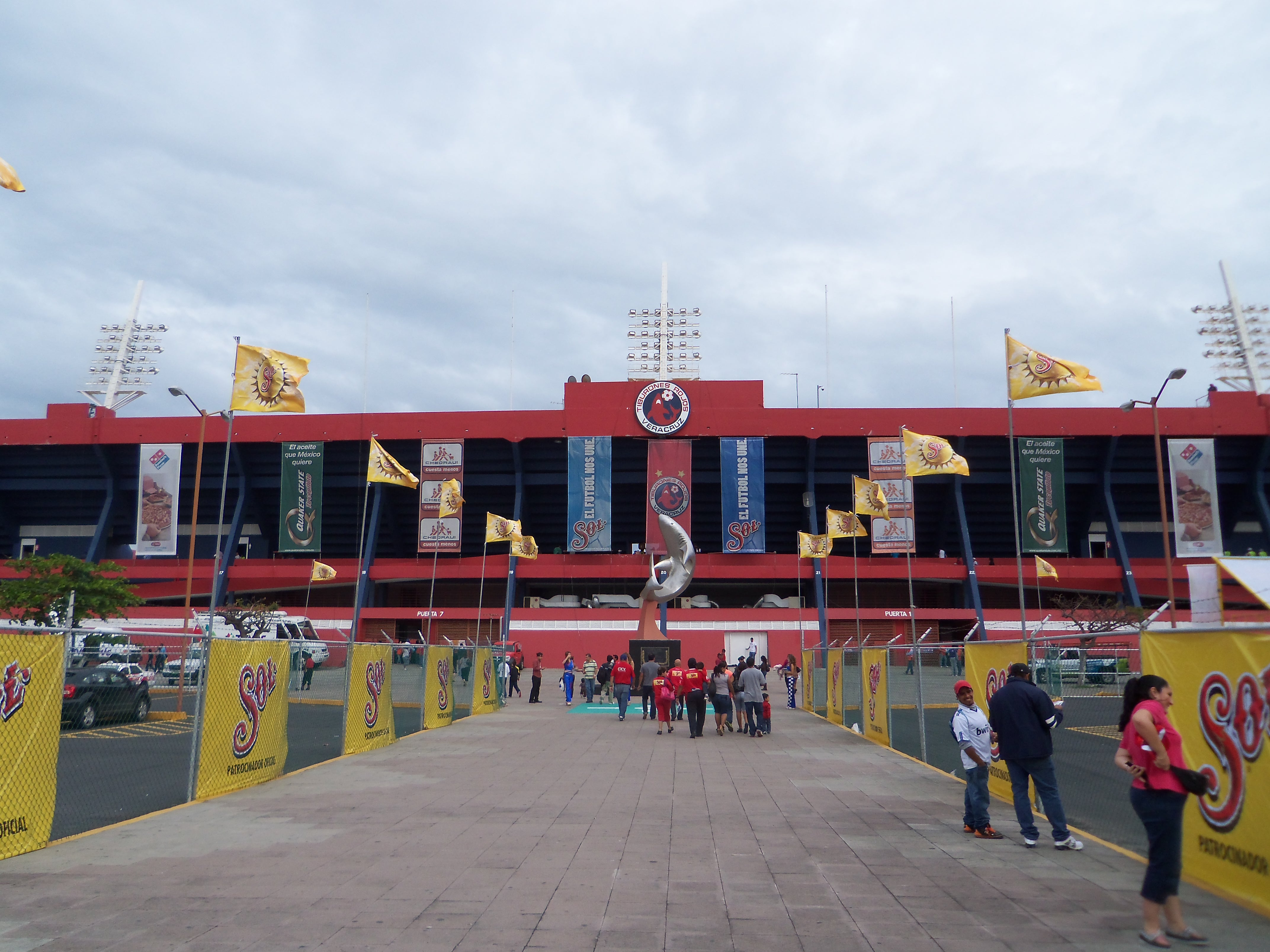
Estadio Luis "Pirata" Fuente

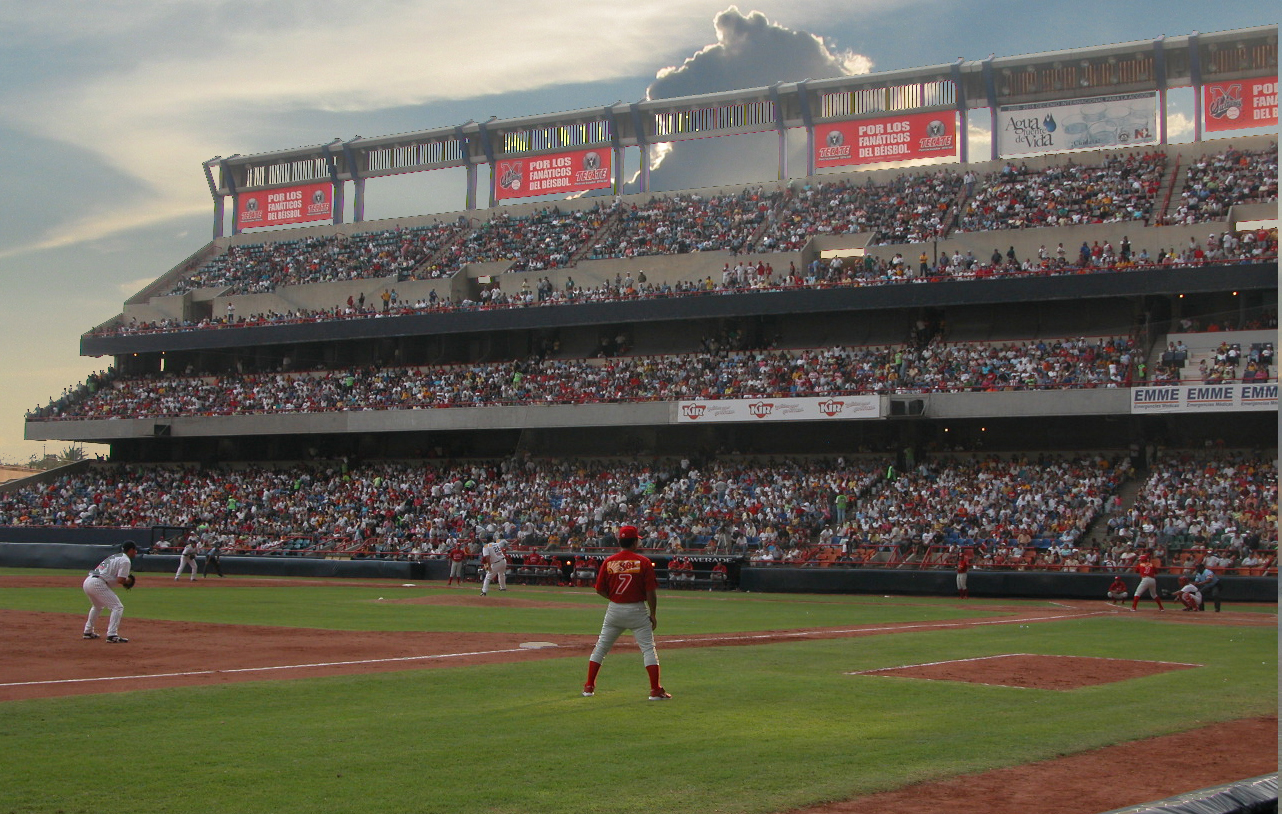
Estadio Mobil Super

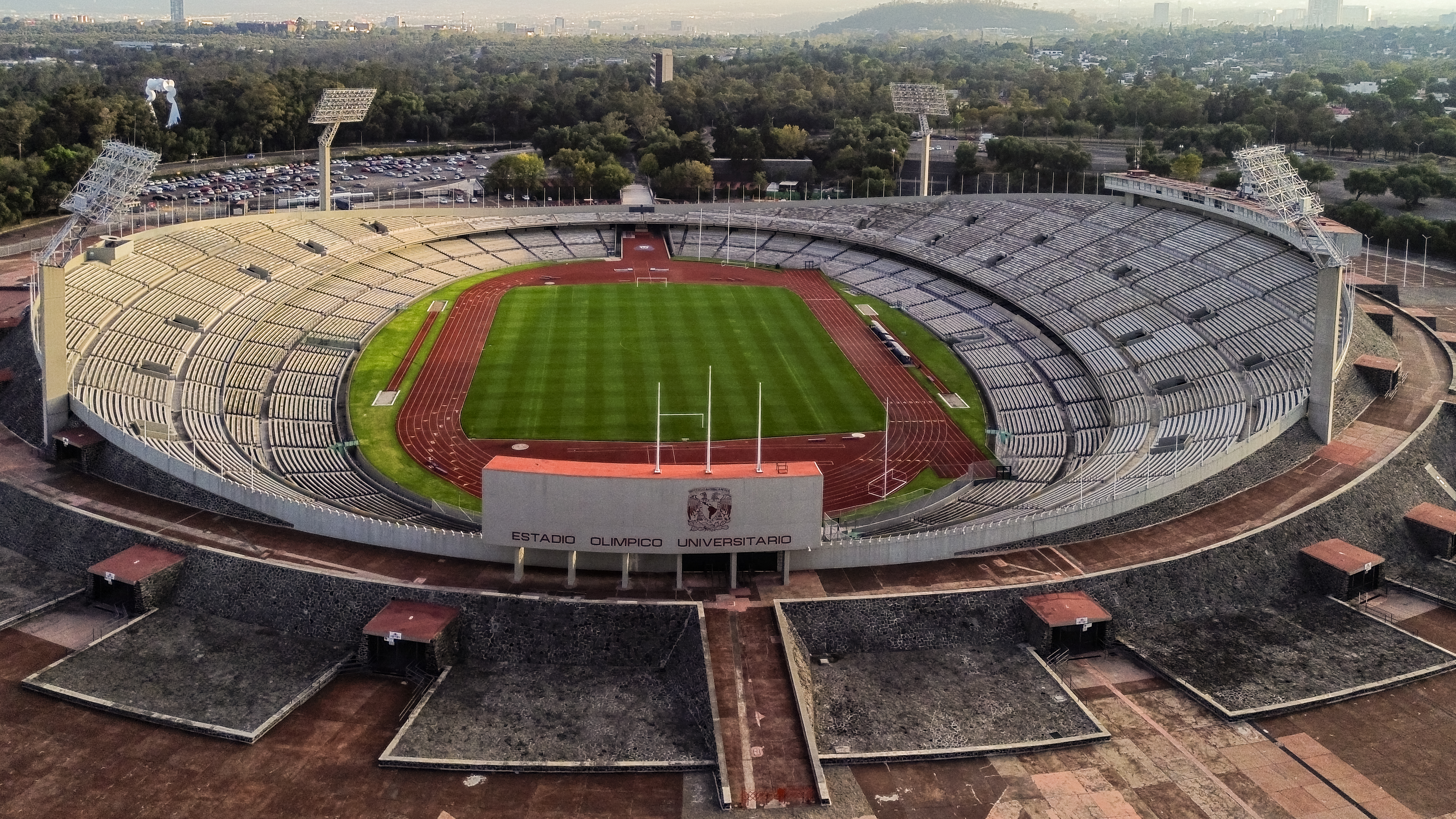
Estadio Olímpico Universitario

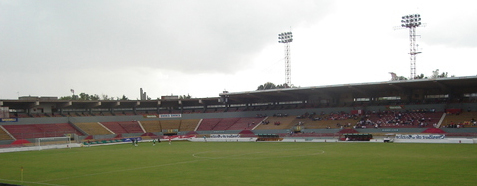
Estadio Tres de Marzo

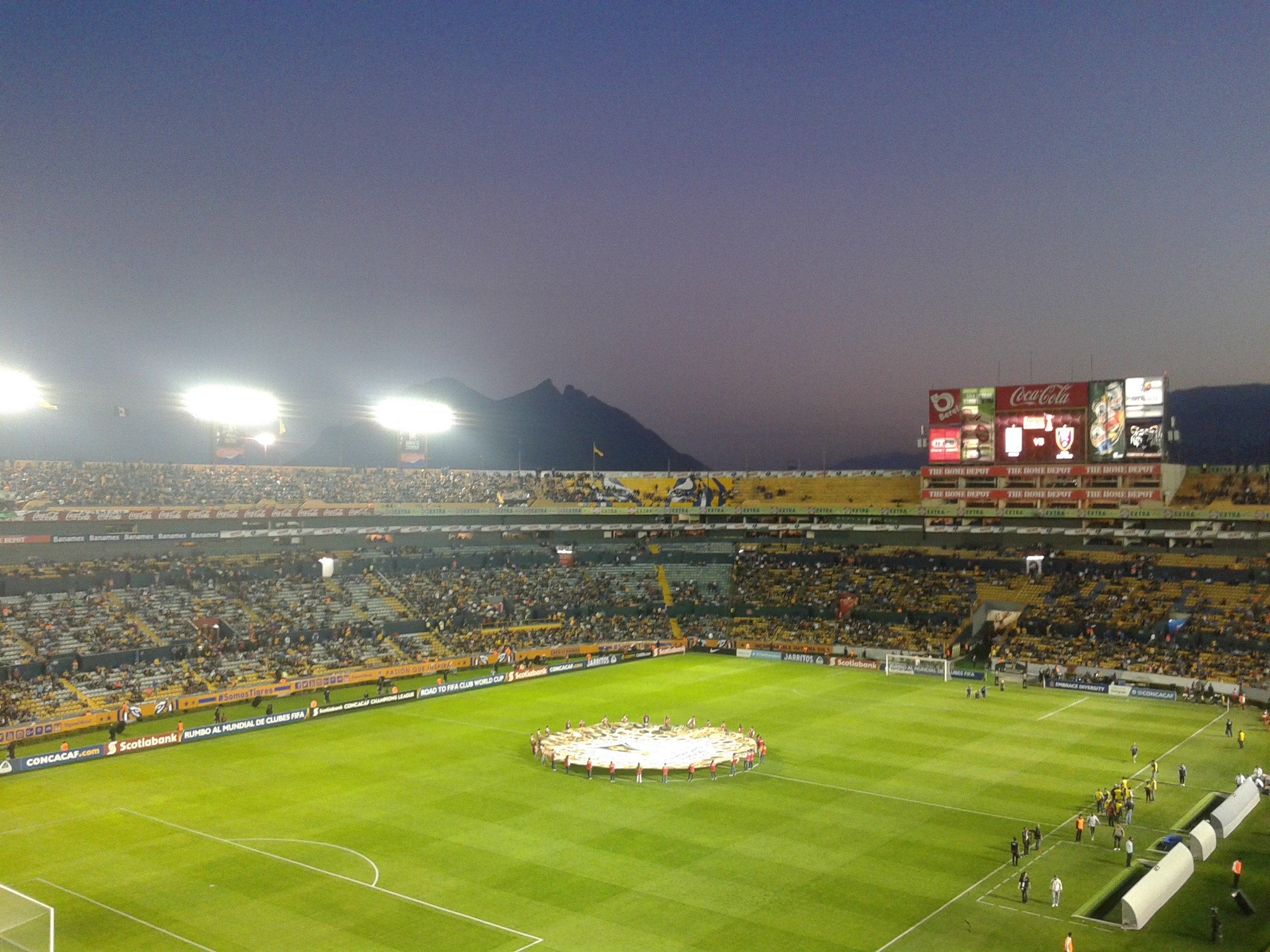
Estadio Universitario

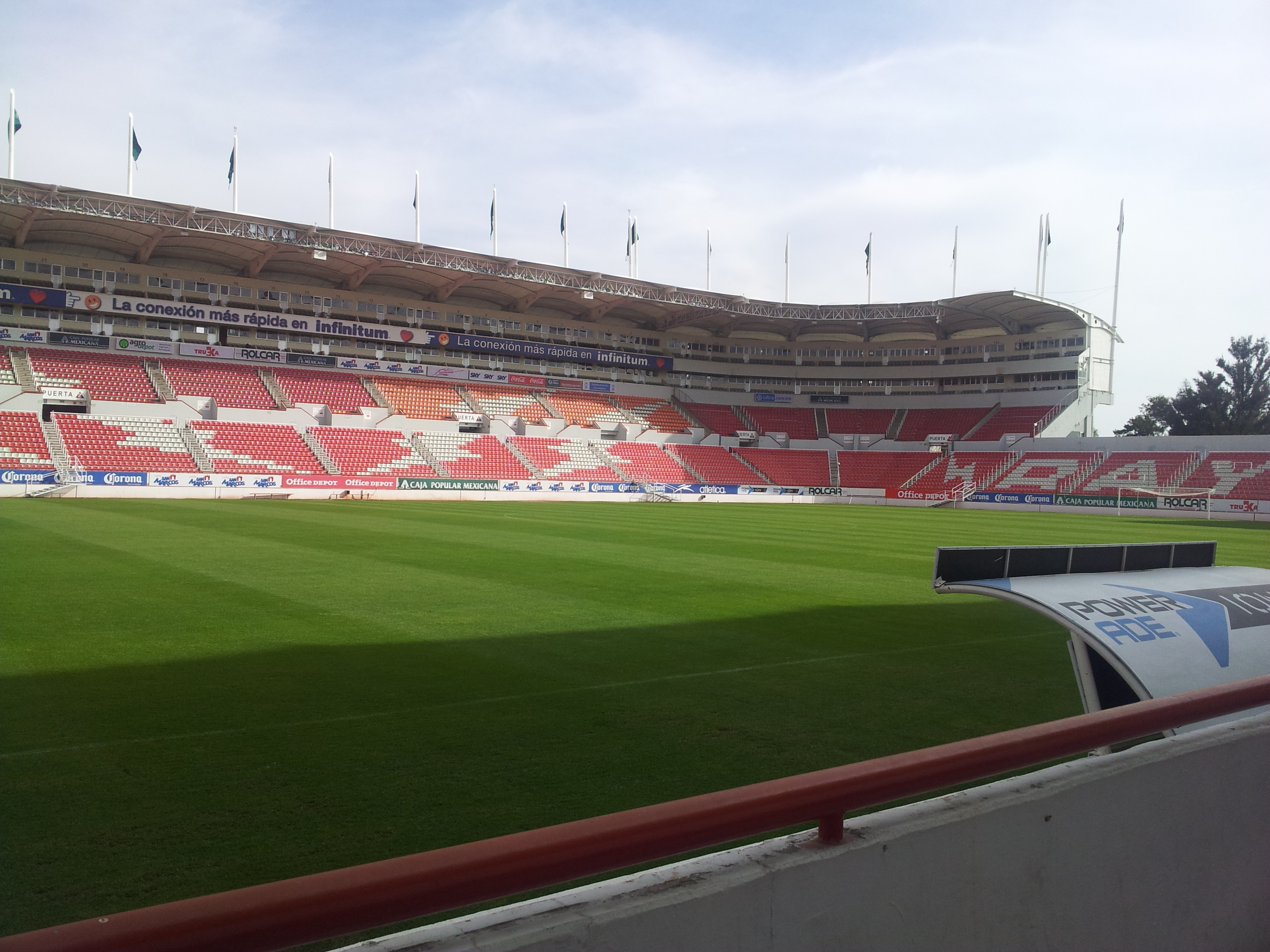
Estadio Victoria

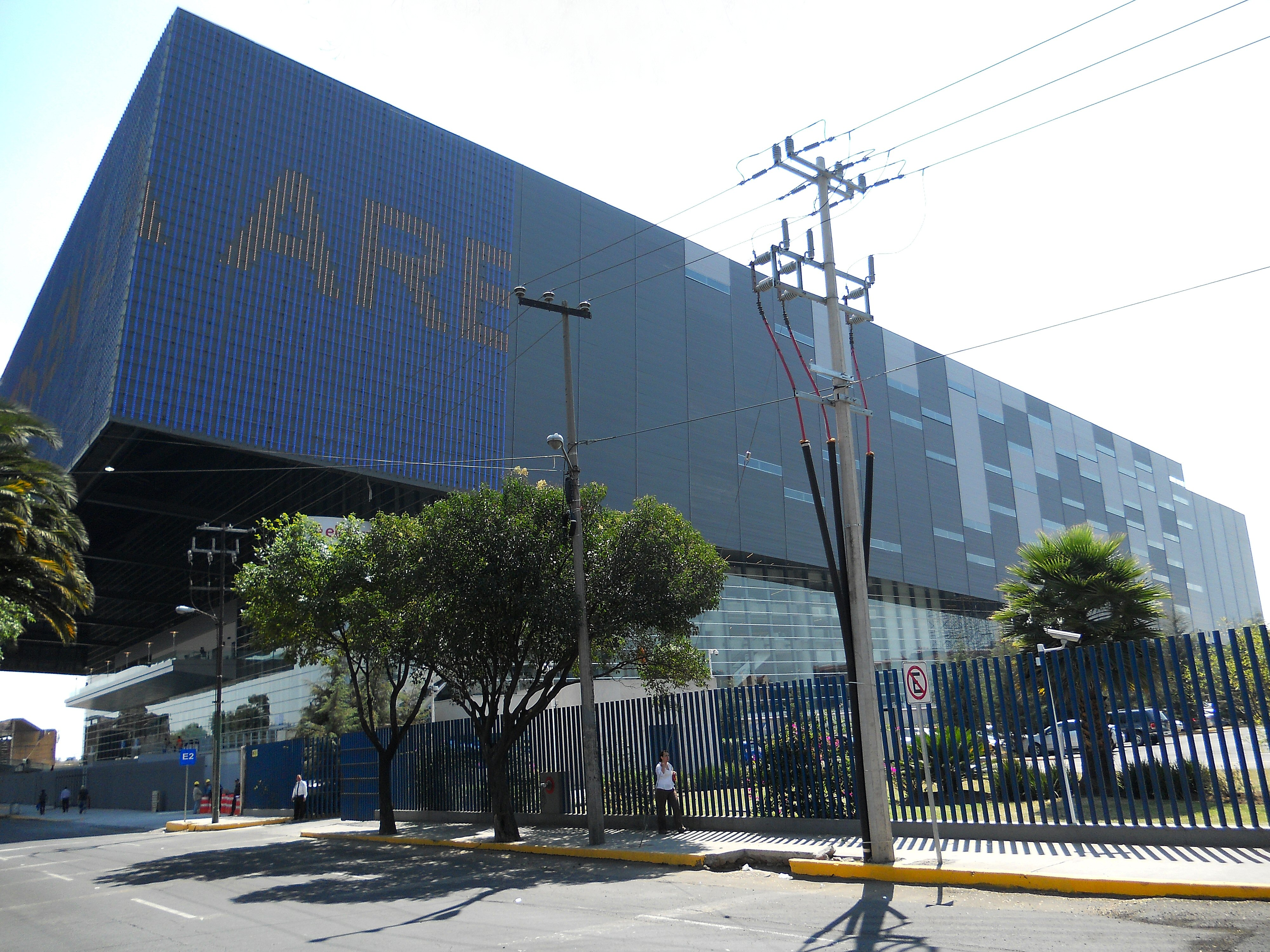
Mexico City Arena

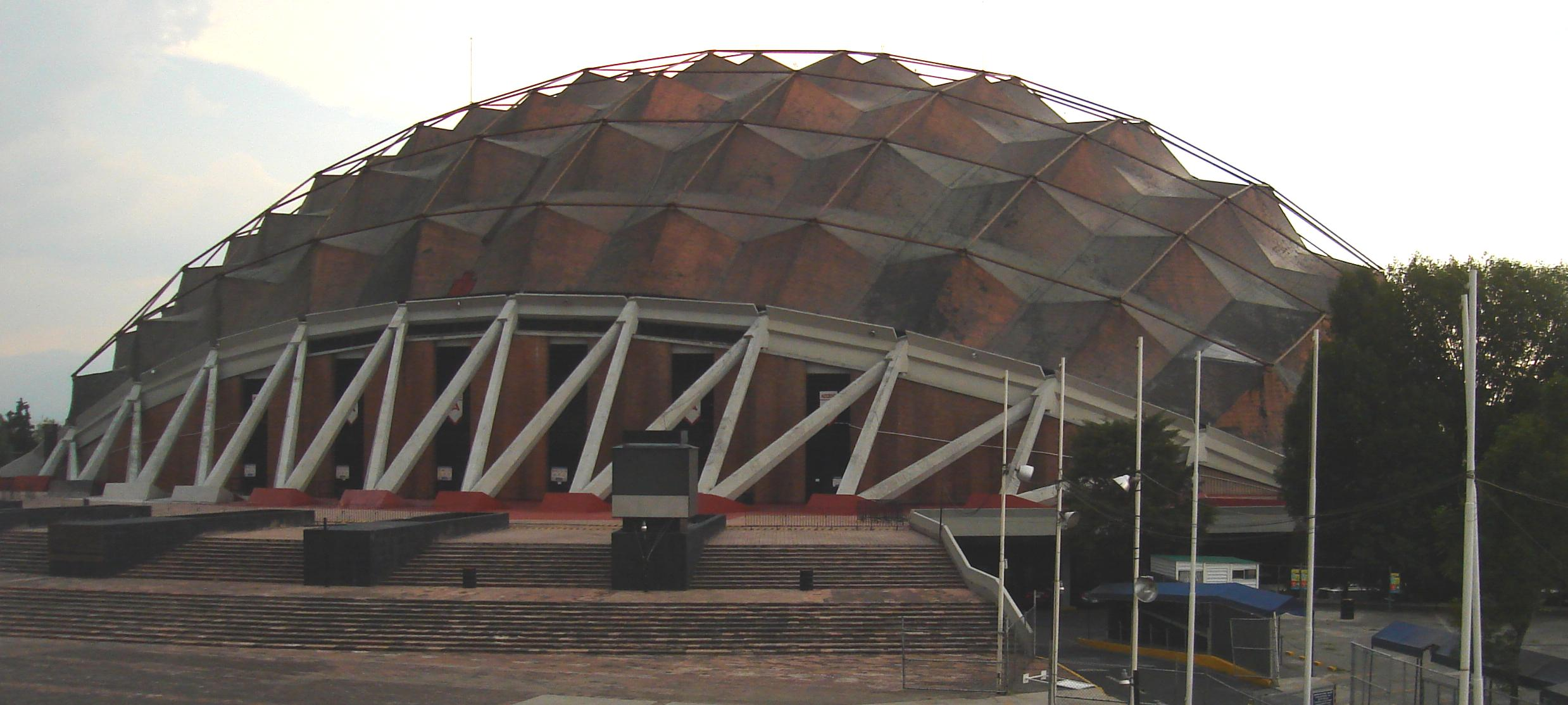
Palacio de los Deportes
