= Diana Theatre =

Coordinates: 20.665502°N 103.349358°W

Teatro Diana
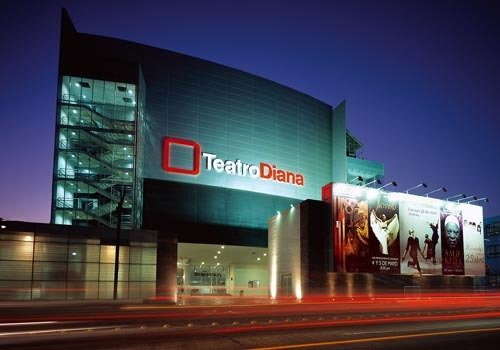
- Interactive map of Teatro Diana
- Location: Guadalajara, Jalisco
- Seating type: Seated
- Capacity: 2,345
- Type: Concert theater

Construction
- Opened: February 2005; 15 years old

Website
- Venue website

The Diana Theatre is a 2,345-seat indoor theater in Guadalajara, Jalisco.

== History ==
Many international concerts have been held in the venue, some performers who have performed shows in the theater are, Morrissey, Pink Floyd, Vienna Boys' Choir, High School Musical, Wisin & Yandel, Lila Downs and many more.

The theater opened in February 2005 with Lord of the Dance and Michael Flately being the first acts to perform in the venue with 8 shows and over 33,000 attendees.

== See also ==
- Auditorio Telmex
- List of music venues in Mexico
