= Pabellón Ciudad de Algeciras =

Arena in Algeciras, Spain

Coordinates: 36.1426°N 5.4513°W

Ciudad de Algeciras - Doctor Juan Carlos Mateo
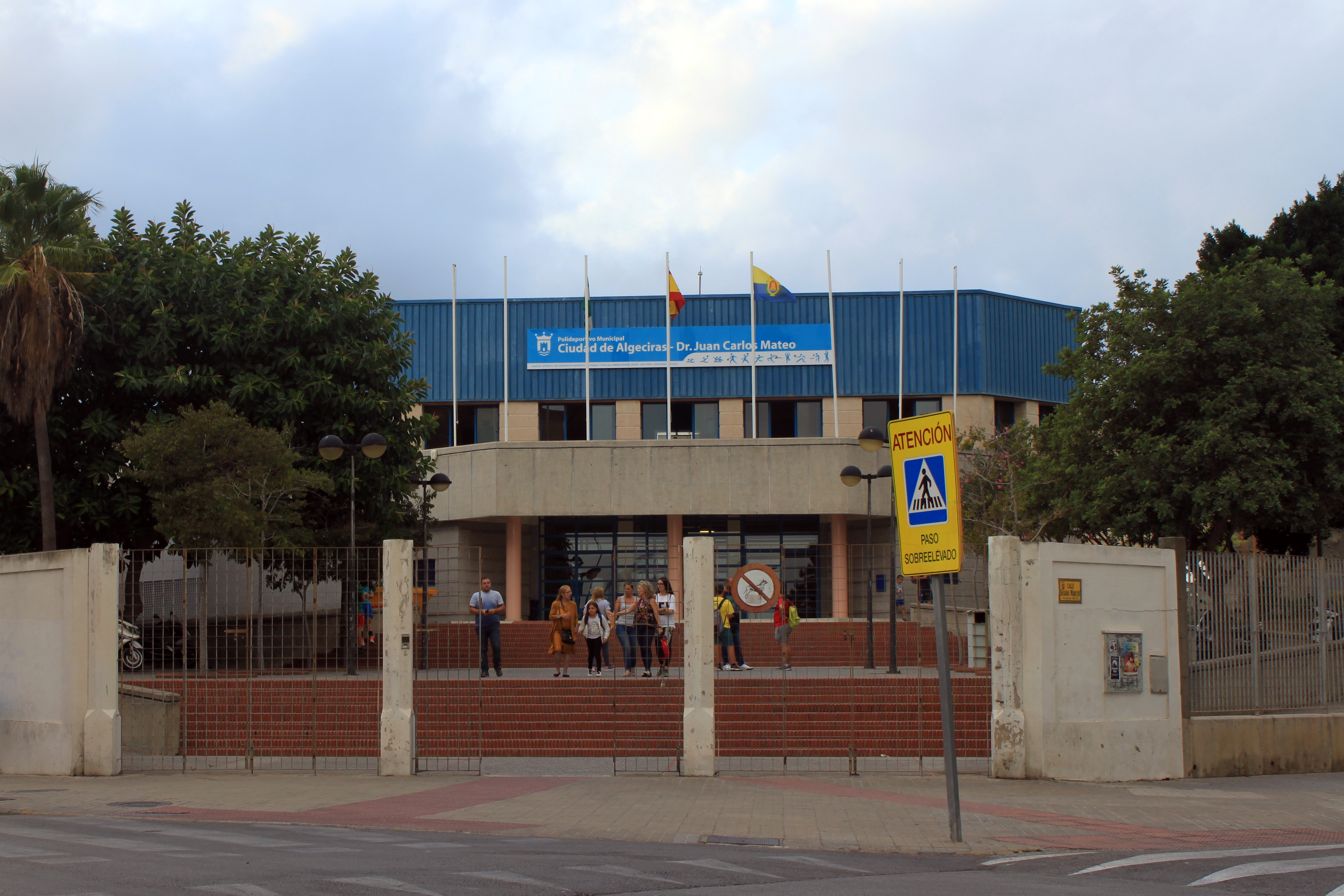
- Interactive map of Ciudad de Algeciras - Doctor Juan Carlos Mateo
- Full name: Pabellón Ciudad de Algeciras
- Location: Algeciras, Andalusia
- Owner: Algeciras City Hall
- Capacity: 2,300
- Surface: Parquet Floor

Construction
- Opened: November 27, 1988; 37 years ago

Tenants
- Algeciras BM; UDEA Algeciras

Pabellón Ciudad de Algeciras-Doctor Juan Carlos Mateo is an arena in Algeciras, Spain. It is primarily used for team handball and is the home arena of Algeciras BM. The arena holds 2,300 people.

Initially named as only Ciudad de Algeciras, on 10 May 2017, the pavilion changed its denomination by adding the name of Doctor Juan Carlos Mateo.
