= Pabellon Don Vasco =

Arena in Michoacan, Mexico

Pabellon Don Vasco (English: Don Vasco Pavilion) is a 6,560-seat indoor arena located in Morelia, Michoacán, Mexico. It is part of Morelia's fairgrounds.

Originally an outdoor arena, the Pabellon had its roof installed in 2007. It features 18 boxes, which can hold 20 people each. It is used primarily for rodeos and has also accommodated other sports, including boxing, lucha libre, etc. The arena was designed to be expanded to hold 9,000 spectators. The arena measures 32 meters (105 feet) from floor to roof. It has hosted Mexico's National Charro Championship several times.

As Michoacán's largest indoor arena, it can accommodate concerts with a maximum capacity of 7,500. Joan Sebastian, Jenni Rivera, Banda El Recodo, Pedro Fernández, Alicia Villarreal and many other famous regional Mexican recording artists have performed here.
