= 2018–19 EuroLeague regular season =

The 2018–19 EuroLeague Regular Season is played from 11 October 2018 to 6 April 2019. A total of 16 teams compete in the regular season to decide the eight places of the playoffs.

Times since 1 November 2018 up to 22 March 2019 are CET (UTC+1), times up to 26 October 2018 and since 28 March 2019 are CEST (UTC+2).

== Format ==
In the regular season, teams play against each other home-and-away in a round-robin format. The eight first qualified teams will advance to the Playoffs, while the last eight qualified teams will be eliminated. The matchdays are from 11 October 2018 to 5 April 2019.

=== Tiebreakers ===
When all teams have played each other twice:

1. Best record in head-to-head games between all tied teams.
2. Higher cumulative score difference in head-to-head games between all tied teams.
3. Higher cumulative score difference for the entire regular season.
4. Higher total of points scored for the entire regular season.
5. Higher sum of quotients of points in favor and points against of each match played in the regular season.

If a tiebreaker does not resolve a tie completely, a new tiebreak process is initiated with only those teams that remain tied. All points scored in extra periods will not be counted in the standings, nor for any tie-break situation.

== League table ==
Pos	Team	Pld	W	L	PF	PA	PD	Qualification
1	(Turkey) Fenerbahçe Beko	30	25	5	2504	2237	+267	Advance to playoffs
2	(Russia) CSKA Moscow	30	24	6	2590	2397	+193	Advance to playoffs
3	(Spain) Real Madrid	30	22	8	2578	2342	+236	Advance to playoffs
4	(Turkey) Anadolu Efes	30	20	10	2562	2406	+156	Advance to playoffs
5	(Spain) Barcelona Lassa	30	18	12	2358	2282	+76	Advance to playoffs
6	(Greece) Panathinaikos OPAP	30	16	14	2382	2345	+37	Advance to playoffs
7	(Spain) Kirolbet Baskonia	30	15	15	2449	2378	+71	Advance to playoffs
8	(Lithuania) Žalgiris	30	15	15	2360	2323	+37	Advance to playoffs
9	(Greece) Olympiacos	30	15	15	2326	2301	+25	
10	(Israel) Maccabi Tel Aviv	30	14	16	2376	2346	+30	
11	(Germany) Bayern Munich	30	14	16	2348	2404	−56	
12	(Italy) AX Armani Exchange Olimpia	30	14	16	2601	2600	+1	
13	(Russia) Khimki	30	9	21	2333	2449	−116	
14	(Spain) Herbalife Gran Canaria	30	8	22	2317	2616	−299	
15	(Montenegro) Budućnost VOLI	30	6	24	2230	2550	−320	
16	(Turkey) Darüşşafaka Tekfen	30	5	25	2238	2576	−338	

Source: EuroLeague
Rules for classification: All points scored in extra period(s) will not be counted in the standings, nor for any tie-break situation.

=== Positions by round ===
The table lists the positions of teams after completion of each round. In order to preserve chronological evolvements, any postponed matches are not included in the round at which they were originally scheduled, but added to the full round they were played immediately afterwards. For example, if a match is scheduled for round 13, but then postponed and played between rounds 16 and 17, it will be added to the standings for round 16.

Team ╲ Round	1	2	3	4	5	6	7	8	9	10	11	12	13	14	15	16	17	18	19	20	21	22	23	24	25	26	27	28	29	30
Fenerbahçe Beko	1	1	2	3	3	3	3	3	2	1	1	1	1	1	1	1	1	1	1	1	1	1	1	1	1	1	1	1	1	1
CSKA Moscow	3	3	3	2	2	2	2	2	3	2	3	3	3	3	3	3	3	3	3	3	3	2	2	2	2	2	2	2	2	2
Real Madrid	5	4	1	1	1	1	1	1	1	3	2	2	2	2	2	2	2	2	2	2	2	3	3	3	3	3	3	3	3	3
Anadolu Efes	4	6	6	5	7	7	5	4	4	4	4	4	4	4	4	4	4	4	4	4	4	4	4	4	4	4	4	4	4	4
Barcelona Lassa	14	15	10	9	6	6	6	7	6	7	7	9	11	9	7	6	6	6	6	6	5	5	5	5	5	5	5	5	5	5
Panathinaikos OPAP	8	8	5	7	5	4	7	6	7	8	9	6	10	11	11	11	8	10	12	12	11	12	11	11	10	9	9	7	7	6
Kirolbet Baskonia	7	9	12	13	9	11	11	12	11	12	12	11	9	10	10	10	10	8	7	9	8	8	8	7	6	6	6	6	6	7
Žalgiris	10	5	9	8	10	9	9	9	10	9	8	10	7	6	8	9	11	13	11	11	13	13	13	13	12	12	10	10	8	8
Olympiacos	2	2	7	6	8	10	10	8	8	5	5	5	5	5	5	5	5	5	5	5	6	6	7	8	8	8	8	9	11	9
Maccabi Tel Aviv	9	13	8	11	13	13	14	14	15	14	14	14	13	14	13	14	13	11	10	10	10	10	10	10	9	10	11	11	10	10
Bayern Munich	13	11	13	10	11	8	8	10	9	11	10	8	6	8	6	8	9	7	8	7	7	7	9	9	11	11	12	12	12	11
AX Armani Exchange Olimpia	6	7	4	4	4	5	4	5	5	6	6	7	8	7	9	7	7	9	9	8	9	9	6	6	7	7	7	8	9	12
Khimki	15	16	16	15	12	12	13	11	12	10	11	13	14	12	14	12	12	12	13	13	12	11	12	12	13	13	13	13	13	13
Herbalife Gran Canaria	16	12	14	14	15	14	12	13	14	13	13	12	12	13	12	13	14	14	14	14	14	14	14	14	14	14	14	14	14	14
Budućnost VOLI	11	14	15	16	16	16	15	15	13	15	15	15	15	15	15	15	15	15	15	15	15	15	15	15	15	15	15	15	15	15
Darüşşafaka Tekfen	12	10	11	12	14	15	16	16	16	16	16	16	16	16	16	16	16	16	16	16	16	16	16	16	16	16	16	16	16	16

Leader
Qualification to playoffs

Source: EuroLeague

== Matches ==
=== Round 1 ===
11 October 2018	CSKA Moscow (Russia)	95–75	(Spain) Barcelona Lassa	Moscow
19:00	Scoring by quarter: 21–17, 30–12, 18–29, 26–17
	Pts: Higgins 18; Rebs: Clyburn 9 Asts: Clyburn, Rodríguez 4 PIR: Clyburn 22	Boxscore	Pts: Kuric 15; Rebs: Claver 10; Asts: Heurtel 12; PIR: Claver 12	Arena: Megasport Arena; Attendance: 12,023; Referees: Robert Lottermoser, Matej Boltauzer, Michele Rossi

11 October 2018	Panathinaikos OPAP (Greece)	89–84	(Israel) Maccabi Tel Aviv	Athens
20:00	Scoring by quarter: 26–24, 20–21, 24–22, 19–17
	Pts: Lojeski 20; Rebs: Lojeski 5 Asts: Calathes 14; PIR: Lojeski 22	Boxscore	Pts: Wilbekin 24; Rebs: Caloiaro 7 Asts: Wilbekin 8 PIR: Wilbekin 24	Arena: Olympic Sports Center; Attendance: 10,150; Referees: Juan Carlos García González, Sreten Radović, Milivoje Jovčić

11 October 2018	Bayern Munich (Germany)	71–90	(Turkey) Anadolu Efes	Munich
20:30	Scoring by quarter: 19–18, 18–26, 14–28, 20–18
	Pts: Đedović 17; Rebs: Barthel 4 Asts: Jović 5 PIR: Đedović, Jović 17	Boxscore	Pts: Motum 14; Rebs: Balbay 7 Asts: Larkin, Micić 5 PIR: three players 19	Arena: Audi Dome; Attendance: 3,358; Referees: Borys Ryzhyk, Emilio Pérez Pizarro, Miloš Koljenšić

11 October 2018	Real Madrid (Spain)	109–93	(Turkey) Darüşşafaka Tekfen	Madrid
21:00	Scoring by quarter: 25–18, 28–20, 38–31, 18–24
	Pts: Randolph 16; Rebs: Kuzmić, Tavares 6 Asts: Llull 8 PIR: Llull 19	Boxscore	Pts: McCallum 18; Rebs: Eric, McCallum 6 Asts: McCallum 6 PIR: McCallum 20	Arena: WiZink Center; Attendance: 8,168; Referees: Luigi Lamonica, Piotr Pastusiak, Anne Panther

12 October 2018	Budućnost VOLI (Montenegro)	71–82	(Italy) AX Armani Exchange Olimpia	Podgorica
18:45	Scoring by quarter: 11–22, 20–20, 20–15, 20–25
	Pts: Clark 22; Rebs: three players 6 Asts: Ivanović 6 PIR: Clark 17	Boxscore	Pts: Micov 15; Rebs: four players 5 Asts: James, Nedović 5 PIR: Nedović 21	Arena: Morača; Attendance: 4,409; Referees: Miguel Ángel Pérez Niz, Oļegs Latiševs, Ioannis Foufis

12 October 2018	Khimki (Russia)	66–87	(Greece) Olympiacos	Mytishchi
19:00	Scoring by quarter: 22–20, 12–24, 20–19, 12–24
	Pts: Shved 34; Rebs: Gill 5 Asts: Shved 6 PIR: Shved 26	Boxscore	Pts: LeDay 14; Rebs: Milutinov 9 Asts: Spanoulis 7 PIR: LeDay 20	Arena: Mytishchi Arena; Attendance: 6,497; Referees: Daniel Hierrezuelo, Damir Javor, Mehdi Difallah

12 October 2018	Žalgiris (Lithuania)	79–87	(Spain) Kirolbet Baskonia	Kaunas
19:00	Scoring by quarter: 24–22, 15–20, 14–21, 26–24
	Pts: Wolters 19; Rebs: Davies 4 Asts: Wolters 5 PIR: Wolters 27	Boxscore	Pts: Granger 15; Rebs: Diop 8 Asts: three players 4 PIR: Granger 21	Arena: Žalgirio Arena; Attendance: 15,107; Referees: Ilija Belošević, Elias Koromilas, Milan Nedović

12 October 2018	Fenerbahçe Beko (Turkey)	97–72	(Spain) Herbalife Gran Canaria	Istanbul
19:45	Scoring by quarter: 22–10, 27–25, 26–23, 22–14
	Pts: Veselý 19; Rebs: Veselý 11; Asts: Sloukas 7 PIR: Veselý 34	Boxscore	Pts: Evans 13; Rebs: Balvín 6 Asts: Hannah 6 PIR: Hannah 13	Arena: Ülker Sports and Event Hall; Attendance: 8,081; Referees: Christos Christodoulou, Carmelo Paternicò, Fernando Rocha

=== Round 2 ===
16 October 2018	Darüşşafaka Tekfen (Turkey)	71–63	(Montenegro) Budućnost VOLI	Istanbul
19:15	Scoring by quarter: 14–25, 25–10, 14–14, 18–14
	Pts: Peiners 15; Rebs: Evans 12; Asts: McCallum 5 PIR: Evans, Peiners 19	Boxscore	Pts: Clark, Gordić 11; Rebs: three players 5 Asts: Craft 4 PIR: Ivanović 12	Arena: Volkswagen Arena; Attendance: 1,011; Referees: Robert Lottermoser, Carmelo Paternicò, Jordi Aliaga

16 October 2018	Maccabi Tel Aviv (Israel)	86–89	(Russia) CSKA Moscow	Tel Aviv
20:05	Scoring by quarter: 22–24, 24–26, 22–17, 18–22
	Pts: Caloiaro 21; Rebs: Black 7 Asts: Roll 7 PIR: Caloiaro 27	Boxscore	Pts: De Colo 27; Rebs: Clyburn 10; Asts: De Colo 5 PIR: De Colo 32	Arena: Menora Mivtachim Arena; Attendance: 10,600; Referees: Borys Ryzhyk, Carlos Cortés, Milan Nedović

16 October 2018	Bayern Munich (Germany)	80–79	(Greece) Panathinaikos OPAP	Munich
20:30	Scoring by quarter: 20–20, 20–21, 16–17, 24–21
	Pts: Đedović 19; Rebs: Lučić 5 Asts: Jović 5 PIR: Lučić 19	Boxscore	Pts: Langford 18; Rebs: Mitoglou 6 Asts: Calathes 8 PIR: Langford 21	Arena: Audi Dome; Attendance: 3,990; Referees: Luigi Lamonica, Sašo Petek, Marcin Kowalski

16 October 2018	Herbalife Gran Canaria (Spain)	87–86	(Spain) Barcelona Lassa	Las Palmas
21:00	Scoring by quarter: 18–26, 26–18, 20–25, 23–17
	Pts: Evans 19; Rebs: Evans 4 Asts: Evans 5 PIR: Evans 24	Boxscore	Pts: Kuric 24; Rebs: Tomić 5 Asts: Pangos 5 PIR: Kuric 25	Arena: Gran Canaria Arena; Attendance: 5,285; Referees: Damir Javor, Anne Panther, Ioannis Foufis

17 October 2018	Anadolu Efes (Turkey)	79–93	(Lithuania) Žalgiris	Istanbul
19:00	Scoring by quarter: 19–19, 13–27, 16–22, 31–25
	Pts: Simon 17; Rebs: Pleiß 7 Asts: Simon 5 PIR: Simon 25	Boxscore	Pts: Davies 18; Rebs: Davies 7 Asts: Wolters 7 PIR: Davies 21	Arena: Sinan Erdem Dome; Attendance: 5,549 (tentative); Referees: Miguel Ángel Pérez Niz, Fernando Rocha, Uroš Obrknežević

17 October 2018	Fenerbahçe Beko (Turkey)	93–85	(Russia) Khimki	Istanbul
19:45	Scoring by quarter: 28–21, 26–22, 12–20, 27–22
	Pts: Melli 16; Rebs: Datome 8 Asts: Mahmutoğlu 4 PIR: Datome, Veselý 18	Boxscore	Pts: Shved 26; Rebs: Gill 5 Asts: Shved 8 PIR: Shved 25	Arena: Ülker Sports and Event Hall; Attendance: 8,132; Referees: Juan Carlos García González, Piotr Pastusiak, Artūras Šukys

17 October 2018	Kirolbet Baskonia (Spain)	80–85	(Greece) Olympiacos	Vitoria-Gasteiz
20:45	Scoring by quarter: 19–27, 20–23, 13–17, 28–18
	Pts: Shengelia 21; Rebs: Poirier 9 Asts: Huertas 4 PIR: Shengelia 24	Boxscore	Pts: Milutinov 23; Rebs: Milutinov 11; Asts: Spanoulis 8 PIR: Milutinov 33	Arena: Fernando Buesa Arena; Attendance: 10,327; Referees: Matej Boltauzer, Oļegs Latiševs, Amit Balak

17 October 2018	AX Armani Exchange Olimpia (Italy)	85–91	(Spain) Real Madrid	Assago
20:45	Scoring by quarter: 28–13, 22–28, 14–26, 21–24
	Pts: James 21; Rebs: Brooks 12; Asts: James 7 PIR: Micov 18	Boxscore	Pts: Randolph 25; Rebs: Randolph 11; Asts: Campazzo 7 PIR: Randolph 33	Arena: Mediolanum Forum; Attendance: 8,633; Referees: Saša Pukl, Milivoje Jovčić, Renaud Gelle

=== Round 3 ===
18 October 2018	CSKA Moscow (Russia)	79–75	(Turkey) Darüşşafaka Tekfen	Moscow
19:00	Scoring by quarter: 19–17, 12–21, 26–10, 22–27
	Pts: Higgins 14; Rebs: Hunter, Kurbanov 8 Asts: De Colo, Rodríguez 3 PIR: Kurbanov 21	Boxscore	Pts: Eric, Kidd 15; Rebs: Eric 11; Asts: Kidd, McCallum 2 PIR: Eric 26	Arena: Megasport Arena; Attendance: 4,712; Referees: Ilija Belošević, Benjamín Jiménez, Mario Majkić

18 October 2018	Budućnost VOLI (Montenegro)	68–78	(Israel) Maccabi Tel Aviv	Podgorica
20:00	Scoring by quarter: 16–14, 25–20, 21–24, 6–20
	Pts: Jackson 13; Rebs: Omić 7 Asts: Gordić 5 PIR: Omić 12	Boxscore	Pts: Wilbekin 28; Rebs: Kane 8 Asts: Kane 6 PIR: Wilbekin 30	Arena: Morača; Attendance: 4,609; Referees: Luigi Lamonica, Marcin Kowalski, Rain Peerandi

18 October 2018	Panathinaikos OPAP (Greece)	102–87	(Spain) Herbalife Gran Canaria	Athens
20:00	Scoring by quarter: 21–14, 29–22, 24–19, 28–32
	Pts: Langford, Lekavičius 16; Rebs: Papapetrou, Thomas 7 Asts: Calathes 9 PIR: Papapetrou 25	Boxscore	Pts: Eriksson, Evans 15; Rebs: Báez, Fischer 6 Asts: Hannah 6 PIR: Pasečņiks 14	Arena: Olympic Sports Center; Attendance: 7,487; Referees: Robert Lottermoser, Sérgio Silva, Milan Nedović

18 October 2018	Barcelona Lassa (Spain)	83–73	(Germany) Bayern Munich	Barcelona
21:00	Scoring by quarter: 26–17, 18–19, 21–18, 18–19
	Pts: Tomić 18; Rebs: three players 5 Asts: Tomić 5 PIR: Tomić 25	Boxscore	Pts: Lô 16; Rebs: Lučić 4 Asts: Đedović 4 PIR: Lô 20	Arena: Palau Blaugrana; Attendance: 4,372; Referees: Christos Christodoulou, Carmelo Paternicò, Gytis Vilius

19 October 2018	Khimki (Russia)	84–85	(Turkey) Anadolu Efes	Mytishchi
19:00	Scoring by quarter: 21–18, 16–27, 18–22, 29–18
	Pts: Shved 25; Rebs: Thomas 6 Asts: Shved 5 PIR: Shved 22	Boxscore	Pts: Beaubois 26; Rebs: Moerman 9 Asts: Balbay 6 PIR: Beaubois 30	Arena: Mytishchi Arena; Attendance: 5,153; Referees: Ilija Belošević, Benjamín Jiménez, Mario Majkić

19 October 2018	Žalgiris (Lithuania)	75–82	(Turkey) Fenerbahçe Beko	Kaunas
19:45	Scoring by quarter: 25–18, 17–16, 15–19, 18–29
	Pts: Wolters 23; Rebs: Davies 6 Asts: Wolters 6 PIR: Davies, Wolters 22	Boxscore	Pts: Sloukas 20; Rebs: Veselý 4 Asts: Sloukas 5 PIR: Sloukas 25	Arena: Žalgirio Arena; Attendance: 14,781; Referees: Daniel Hierrezuelo, Mehdi Difallah, Miloš Koljenšić

19 October 2018	Olympiacos (Greece)	75–99	(Italy) AX Armani Exchange Olimpia	Piraeus
20:00	Scoring by quarter: 26–24, 15–20, 22–29, 12–26
	Pts: Milutinov 15; Rebs: Milutinov 10; Asts: Williams-Goss 6 PIR: Milutinov 22	Boxscore	Pts: James 22; Rebs: Kuzminskas 7 Asts: James 5 PIR: Nedović 26	Arena: Peace and Friendship Stadium; Attendance: 9,202; Referees: Juan Carlos García González, Piotr Pastusiak, Seffi Shemmesh

19 October 2018	Real Madrid (Spain)	97–79	(Spain) Kirolbet Baskonia	Madrid
21:00	Scoring by quarter: 25–19, 27–25, 22–23, 23–12
	Pts: Llull 23; Rebs: Tavares 11; Asts: Campazzo 5 PIR: Llull 24	Boxscore	Pts: Huertas 14; Rebs: Diop, 5 Asts: Vildoza 5 PIR: Garino 16	Arena: WiZink Center; Attendance: 10,390; Referees: Borys Ryzhyk, Emin Moğulkoç, Petri Mäntylä

=== Round 4 ===
25 October 2018	Anadolu Efes (Turkey)	89–83	(Turkey) Fenerbahçe Beko	Istanbul
19:30	Scoring by quarter: 12–26, 26–26, 28–13, 23–18
	Pts: Beaubois 17; Rebs: Moerman 10; Asts: Micić 6 PIR: Moerman 21	Boxscore	Pts: Veselý 24; Rebs: Veselý 8 Asts: Sloukas 8 PIR: Veselý 36	Arena: Sinan Erdem Dome; Attendance: 5,348; Referees: Luigi Lamonica, Robert Lottermoser, Sérgio Silva

25 October 2018	Bayern Munich (Germany)	77–71	(Spain) Kirolbet Baskonia	Munich
20:00	Scoring by quarter: 20–11, 23–21, 18–20, 16–19
	Pts: Williams 22; Rebs: three players 6 Asts: Jović 4 PIR: Williams 23	Boxscore	Pts: Poirier 24; Rebs: Poirier 11; Asts: Granger 4 PIR: Shengelia 29	Arena: Audi Dome; Attendance: 3,259; Referees: Damir Javor, Mehdi Difallah, Milija Vojinović

25 October 2018	AX Armani Exchange Olimpia (Italy)	81–80	(Russia) Khimki	Assago
20:45	Scoring by quarter: 23–20, 16–25, 27–17, 15–18
	Pts: James 25; Rebs: Gudaitis 13; Asts: James 8 PIR: James 24	Boxscore	Pts: Mickey 26; Rebs: Mickey 7 Asts: Shved 10; PIR: Mickey 32	Arena: Mediolanum Forum; Attendance: 6,343; Referees: Matej Boltauzer, Carlos Peruga, Tomislav Hordov

25 October 2018	Real Madrid (Spain)	89–55	(Montenegro) Budućnost VOLI	Madrid
21:00	Scoring by quarter: 21–15, 23–16, 21–13, 24–11
	Pts: Carroll, Randolph 11; Rebs: Tavares 14; Asts: Campazzo, Llull 7 PIR: Tavares 24	Boxscore	Pts: Gordić 13; Rebs: Omić 8 Asts: six players 1 PIR: Omić 12	Arena: WiZink Center; Attendance: 7,804; Referees: Elias Koromilas, Jakub Zamojski, Joseph Bissang

25 October 2018	Olympiacos (Greece)	88–80	(Israel) Maccabi Tel Aviv	Piraeus
21:00	Scoring by quarter: 18–21, 27–16, 23–20, 20–23
	Pts: Spanoulis 16; Rebs: Vezenkov 8 Asts: Spanoulis 5 PIR: Williams-Goss 18	Boxscore	Pts: Kane 22; Rebs: Tyus 7 Asts: Kane 6 PIR: Kane 28	Arena: Peace and Friendship Stadium; Attendance: 7,455; Referees: Ilija Belošević, Emin Moğulkoç, Emilio Pérez Pizarro

26 October 2018	Darüşşafaka Tekfen (Turkey)	71–79	(Spain) Barcelona Lassa	Istanbul
19:15	Scoring by quarter: 18–23, 22–24, 24–11, 7–21
	Pts: Eric 17; Rebs: Eric 9 Asts: Özmızrak 3 PIR: Eric 25	Boxscore	Pts: Singleton 18; Rebs: Séraphin 6 Asts: Heurtel, Pangos 5 PIR: Singleton, Tomić 22	Arena: Volkswagen Arena; Attendance: 3,908; Referees: Sreten Radović, Fernando Rocha, Hugues Thépénier

26 October 2018	Panathinaikos OPAP (Greece)	83–87(OT)	(Lithuania) Žalgiris	Athens
20:00	Scoring by quarter: 13–20, 20–24, 18–14, 25–18, Overtime: 7–11
	Pts: Calathes 22; Rebs: Papapetrou 7 Asts: Calathes, Pappas 5 PIR: Calathes 15	Boxscore	Pts: Davies 18; Rebs: Wolters 9 Asts: Walton 5 PIR: White 22	Arena: Olympic Sports Center; Attendance: 11,085 (tentative); Referees: Borys Ryzhyk, Oļegs Latiševs, Benjamín Jiménez

26 October 2018	Herbalife Gran Canaria (Spain)	91–106	(Russia) CSKA Moscow	Las Palmas
21:30	Scoring by quarter: 29–26, 26–26, 22–28, 14–26
	Pts: Hannah 17; Rebs: Tillie 4 Asts: Hannah 6 PIR: Hannah 22	Boxscore	Pts: De Colo 22; Rebs: Clyburn 8 Asts: Rodríguez 8 PIR: De Colo 27	Arena: Gran Canaria Arena; Attendance: 7,430; Referees: Saša Pukl, Milivoje Jovčić, Petros Papapetrou

=== Round 5 ===
1 November 2018	CSKA Moscow (Russia)	69–65	(Greece) Olympiacos	Moscow
18:00	Scoring by quarter: 13–15, 18–20, 21–9, 17–21
	Pts: Rodríguez 20; Rebs: Clyburn 9 Asts: Rodríguez 5 PIR: Clyburn 29	Boxscore	Pts: Spanoulis 16; Rebs: Milutinov 7 Asts: Spanoulis 6 PIR: Printezis, Spanoulis 16	Arena: Megasport Arena; Attendance: 9,052; Referees: Daniel Hierrezuelo, Robert Lottermoser, Sérgio Silva

1 November 2018	Kirolbet Baskonia (Spain)	82–56	(Turkey) Darüşşafaka Tekfen	Vitoria-Gasteiz
18:30	Scoring by quarter: 16–16, 22–14, 26–11, 18–15
	Pts: Shengelia 13; Rebs: Poirier 10; Asts: Huertas 5 PIR: Poirier 21	Boxscore	Pts: Eric, Savas 12; Rebs: Eric 6 Asts: McCallum 6 PIR: Eric 15	Arena: Fernando Buesa Arena; Attendance: 10,799; Referees: Saša Pukl, Elias Koromilas, Jakub Zamojski

1 November 2018	Fenerbahçe Beko (Turkey)	88–84	(Germany) Bayern Munich	Istanbul
18:45	Scoring by quarter: 28–26, 23–22, 14–17, 23–19
	Pts: Datome 19; Rebs: Melli, Veselý 5 Asts: Sloukas 10; PIR: Datome 24	Boxscore	Pts: Booker 15; Rebs: Booker, Williams 7 Asts: Jović 6 PIR: Booker 19	Arena: Ülker Sports and Event Hall; Attendance: 8,868; Referees: Miguel Ángel Pérez Niz, Oļegs Latiševs, Rain Peerandi

1 November 2018	Barcelona Lassa (Spain)	74–58	(Israel) Maccabi Tel Aviv	Barcelona
21:00	Scoring by quarter: 18–12, 16–21, 25–7, 15–18
	Pts: Claver 14; Rebs: Tomić 8 Asts: Pangos 6 PIR: Claver 22	Boxscore	Pts: Caloiaro 11; Rebs: Tyus 8 Asts: Roll 6 PIR: Tyus 15	Arena: Palau Blaugrana; Attendance: 6,772; Referees: Matej Boltauzer, Milivoje Jovčić, Petri Mäntylä

2 November 2018	Khimki (Russia)	87–72	(Spain) Herbalife Gran Canaria	Mytishchi
18:00	Scoring by quarter: 25–21, 24–12, 28–20, 10–19
	Pts: Shved 24; Rebs: Thomas 6 Asts: Shved 7 PIR: Crocker 22	Boxscore	Pts: Pasečņiks, Strawberry 9 Rebs: Pasečņiks 9 Asts: Hannah 5 PIR: Pasečņiks 26	Arena: Mytishchi Arena; Attendance: 4,921; Referees: Sreten Radović, Emin Moğulkoç, Mehdi Difallah

2 November 2018	Budućnost VOLI (Montenegro)	67–72	(Greece) Panathinaikos OPAP	Podgorica
19:00	Scoring by quarter: 15–18, 16–13, 16–19, 20–22
	Pts: Omić 16; Rebs: Omić 10; Asts: Gordić, Ivanović 4 PIR: Omić 24	Boxscore	Pts: Thomas 14; Rebs: Papapetrou 6 Asts: Calathes 9 PIR: Calathes 21	Arena: Morača; Attendance: 4,919; Referees: Juan Carlos García González, Fernando Rocha, Anne Panther

2 November 2018	Žalgiris (Lithuania)	79–90	(Spain) Real Madrid	Kaunas
19:00	Scoring by quarter: 32–18, 12–25, 24–19, 11–28
	Pts: Jankūnas 18; Rebs: Jankūnas 7 Asts: Wolters 5 PIR: Jankūnas 27	Boxscore	Pts: Randolph 16; Rebs: Ayón 10; Asts: Fernández 7 PIR: Ayón 30	Arena: Žalgirio Arena; Attendance: 15,105; Referees: Luigi Lamonica, Damir Javor, Aare Halliko

2 November 2018	AX Armani Exchange Olimpia (Italy)	81–80	(Turkey) Anadolu Efes	Assago
20:45	Scoring by quarter: 24–17, 19–18, 25–19, 13–26
	Pts: James 15; Rebs: Gudaitis 11; Asts: James 6 PIR: Gudaitis 28	Boxscore	Pts: Moerman 23; Rebs: Micić, Pleiß 7 Asts: Micić 5 PIR: Moerman 26	Arena: Mediolanum Forum; Attendance: 9,831; Referees: Christos Christodoulou, Borys Ryzhyk, Tomasz Trawicki

=== Round 6 ===
8 November 2018	Bayern Munich (Germany)	116–70	(Turkey) Darüşşafaka Tekfen	Munich
20:00	Scoring by quarter: 21–17, 33–18, 33–15, 29–20
	Pts: Booker 18; Rebs: Barthel 5 Asts: Jović 7 PIR: Booker 23	Boxscore	Pts: Evans 20; Rebs: Evans 8 Asts: Brown, Kidd 3 PIR: Evans 22	Arena: Audi Dome; Attendance: 3,988; Referees: Daniel Hierrezuelo, Miloš Koljenšić, Robert Vyklický

8 November 2018	Maccabi Tel Aviv (Israel)	66–87	(Spain) Real Madrid	Tel Aviv
20:05	Scoring by quarter: 15–18, 8–23, 21–25, 22–21
	Pts: O'Bryant 17; Rebs: O'Bryant 7 Asts: Kane, O'Bryant 3 PIR: O'Bryant 18	Boxscore	Pts: Llull 17; Rebs: Ayón 12; Asts: three players 3 PIR: Ayón 27	Arena: Menora Mivtachim Arena; Attendance: 10,898; Referees: Saša Pukl, Piotr Pastusiak, Josip Radojkovic

8 November 2018	AX Armani Exchange Olimpia (Italy)	85–90	(Russia) CSKA Moscow	Assago
20:45	Scoring by quarter: 21–16, 20–24, 25–23, 19–27
	Pts: Micov 24; Rebs: Brooks 13; Asts: James 12; PIR: Gudaitis, Micov 21	Boxscore	Pts: Higgins 23; Rebs: Hines 5 Asts: Rodríguez 10; PIR: Higgins 28	Arena: Mediolanum Forum; Attendance: 8,641; Referees: Damir Javor, Carlos Cortés, Rain Peerandi

8 November 2018	Herbalife Gran Canaria (Spain)	90–94	(Turkey) Anadolu Efes	Las Palmas
21:45	Scoring by quarter: 25–24, 27–26, 21–20, 17–24
	Pts: Strawberry 19; Rebs: Báez, Strawberry 5 Asts: Strawberry 7 PIR: Strawberry 26	Boxscore	Pts: Simon 18; Rebs: Dunston 11; Asts: three players 4 PIR: Dunston 20	Arena: Gran Canaria Arena; Attendance: 4,641; Referees: Oļegs Latiševs, Anne Panther, Hugues Thépénier

9 November 2018	Khimki (Russia)	80–87	(Spain) Barcelona Lassa	Mytishchi
18:00	Scoring by quarter: 23–19, 15–19, 21–29, 21–20
	Pts: Shved 27; Rebs: Thomas 6 Asts: Shved 6 PIR: Shved 28	Boxscore	Pts: Heurtel 18; Rebs: Tomić 6 Asts: Heurtel 8 PIR: Tomić 27	Arena: Mytishchi Arena; Attendance: 7,151; Referees: Luigi Lamonica, Borys Ryzhyk, Milija Vojinović

9 November 2018	Budućnost VOLI (Montenegro)	60–72	(Lithuania) Žalgiris	Podgorica
19:00	Scoring by quarter: 15–18, 18–15, 15–24, 12–15
	Pts: Omić 16; Rebs: Clark 7 Asts: four players 3 PIR: Omić 19	Boxscore	Pts: Davies 20; Rebs: Westermann 6 Asts: Wolters 6 PIR: Davies 20	Arena: Morača; Attendance: 4,417; Referees: Christos Christodoulou, Carlos Peruga, Clemens Fritz

9 November 2018	Panathinaikos OPAP (Greece)	93–80	(Greece) Olympiacos	Athens
20:00	Scoring by quarter: 21–23, 20–25, 26–14, 26–18
	Pts: Lekavičius 17; Rebs: Calathes 7 Asts: Calathes 7 PIR: Gist 18	Boxscore	Pts: Printezis 26; Rebs: LeDay 6 Asts: Williams-Goss 5 PIR: Printezis 34	Arena: Olympic Sports Center; Attendance: 17,345; Referees: Miguel Ángel Pérez Niz, Carmelo Paternicò, Jakub Zamojski

9 November 2018	Kirolbet Baskonia (Spain)	72–74	(Turkey) Fenerbahçe Beko	Vitoria-Gasteiz
20:30	Scoring by quarter: 20–18, 13–15, 22–15, 17–26
	Pts: Diop 17; Rebs: Diop 6 Asts: Vildoza 5 PIR: Diop 25	Boxscore	Pts: Datome 16; Rebs: Datome 5 Asts: Sloukas 4 PIR: Lauvergne 20	Arena: Fernando Buesa Arena; Attendance: 10,929; Referees: Sreten Radović, Matej Boltauzer, Uroš Obrknežević

=== Round 7 ===
15 November 2018	Darüşşafaka Tekfen (Turkey)	92–98	(Italy) AX Armani Exchange Olimpia	Istanbul
18:15	Scoring by quarter: 19–26, 30–28, 20–14, 23–30
	Pts: Eric 16; Rebs: Kidd 6 Asts: McCallum 5 PIR: Diebler, Eric 15	Boxscore	Pts: James 21; Rebs: Gudaitis, Tarczewski 5 Asts: James 5 PIR: Micov 21	Arena: Volkswagen Arena; Attendance: 2,343; Referees: Benjamín Jiménez, Anne Panther, Ioannis Foufis

15 November 2018	Budućnost VOLI (Montenegro)	99–84	(Spain) Kirolbet Baskonia	Podgorica
19:00	Scoring by quarter: 26–18, 22–19, 27–23, 24–24
	Pts: Jackson 24; Rebs: Clark, Šehović 5 Asts: Ivanović 7 PIR: Jackson 31	Boxscore	Pts: Shengelia 16; Rebs: Huertas 5 Asts: Huertas 8 PIR: Huertas 26	Arena: Morača; Attendance: 4,138; Referees: Oļegs Latiševs, Carmelo Paternicò, Petros Papapetrou

15 November 2018	Olympiacos (Greece)	72–73	(Turkey) Fenerbahçe Beko	Piraeus
20:00	Scoring by quarter: 18–21, 21–18, 14–11, 19–23
	Pts: Papanikolaou 18; Rebs: Printezis 10; Asts: Spanoulis, Williams-Goss 5 PIR: Papanikolaou 25	Boxscore	Pts: Sloukas 20; Rebs: Melli 9 Asts: Sloukas 4 PIR: Sloukas 22	Arena: Peace and Friendship Stadium; Attendance: 9,379; Referees: Borys Ryzhyk, Fernando Rocha, Carlos Peruga

15 November 2018	Real Madrid (Spain)	79–74	(Russia) Khimki	Madrid
21:00	Scoring by quarter: 19–12, 22–23, 15–20, 23–19
	Pts: Carroll 15; Rebs: Randolph 6 Asts: Causeur, Fernández 4 PIR: Causeur 19	Boxscore	Pts: Crocker, Gill 16; Rebs: Mickey 10; Asts: Bost 6 PIR: Gill 19	Arena: WiZink Center; Attendance: 8,517; Referees: Robert Lottermoser, Milivoje Jovčić, Milan Nedović

16 November 2018	Anadolu Efes (Turkey)	78–62	(Greece) Panathinaikos OPAP	Istanbul
18:30	Scoring by quarter: 19–11, 25–17, 16–18, 18–16
	Pts: Beaubois 19; Rebs: Simon 8 Asts: Micić, Simon 5 PIR: Beaubois 22	Boxscore	Pts: Calathes, Thomas 11; Rebs: Gist, Lojeski 5 Asts: Calathes 8 PIR: Gist 14	Arena: Sinan Erdem Dome; Attendance: 7,031; Referees: Saša Pukl, Tomislav Hordov, Jurgis Laurinavicius

16 November 2018	Žalgiris (Lithuania)	85–88(OT)	(Spain) Barcelona Lassa	Kaunas
19:00	Scoring by quarter: 18–23, 16–16, 16–21, 26–16, Overtime: 9–12
	Pts: White 21; Rebs: White 8 Asts: Walkup, Wolters 6 PIR: White 31	Boxscore	Pts: Kuric 15; Rebs: Singleton 7 Asts: Pangos 5 PIR: Kuric 17	Arena: Žalgirio Arena; Attendance: 15,126; Referees: Ilija Belošević, Piotr Pastusiak, Mehdi Difallah

16 November 2018	Bayern Munich (Germany)	79–93	(Russia) CSKA Moscow	Munich
20:30	Scoring by quarter: 23–30, 17–26, 25–21, 14–16
	Pts: Đedović, Williams 14; Rebs: Barthel 11; Asts: Jović 4 PIR: Williams 19	Boxscore	Pts: Higgins 18; Rebs: Clyburn 8 Asts: Rodríguez 8 PIR: Higgins 22	Arena: Audi Dome; Attendance: 4,613; Referees: Sreten Radović, Jakub Zamojski, Nick Van den Broeck

16 November 2018	Herbalife Gran Canaria (Spain)	84–78	(Israel) Maccabi Tel Aviv	Las Palmas
21:00	Scoring by quarter: 23–15, 20–23, 22–19, 19–21
	Pts: Evans 17; Rebs: Báez 10; Asts: Hannah 5 PIR: Báez 32	Boxscore	Pts: Roll 15; Rebs: Tyus 9 Asts: Wilbekin 4 PIR: Tyus 17	Arena: Gran Canaria Arena; Attendance: 4,931; Referees: Luigi Lamonica, Elias Koromilas, Moritz Reiter

=== Round 8 ===
20 November 2018	Anadolu Efes (Turkey)	90–77	(Israel) Maccabi Tel Aviv	Istanbul
18:00	Scoring by quarter: 16–14, 22–17, 24–22, 28–24
	Pts: Dunston, Pleiß 14; Rebs: Dunston 5 Asts: Micić 8 PIR: Dunston 21	Boxscore	Pts: O'Bryant 19; Rebs: Caloiaro 7 Asts: Wilbekin 7 PIR: O'Bryant 17	Arena: Sinan Erdem Dome; Attendance: 3,853; Referees: Daniel Hierrezuelo, Carmelo Paternicò, Miloš Koljenšić

20 November 2018	Fenerbahçe Beko (Turkey)	100–79	(Turkey) Darüşşafaka Tekfen	Istanbul
19:00	Scoring by quarter: 25–10, 21–27, 22–19, 32–23
	Pts: Mahmutoğlu 16; Rebs: Datome 8 Asts: Gudurić, Sloukas 4 PIR: Lauvergne, Mahmutoğlu 19	Boxscore	Pts: Eric 17; Rebs: three players 5 Asts: McCallum 7 PIR: McCallum 22	Arena: Ülker Sports and Event Hall; Attendance: 7,380; Referees: Damir Javor, Ilija Belošević, Artūras Šukys

20 November 2018	Bayern Munich (Germany)	62–72	(Greece) Olympiacos	Munich
20:30	Scoring by quarter: 15–15, 12–16, 16–14, 19–27
	Pts: Lučić, Williams 15; Rebs: Booker, Lučić 5 Asts: Đedović, Hobbs 4 PIR: Lučić 20	Boxscore	Pts: LeDay 12; Rebs: LeDay 12; Asts: Williams-Goss 5 PIR: LeDay 20	Arena: Audi Dome; Attendance: 4,532; Referees: Juan Carlos García González, Emin Moğulkoç, Joseph Bissang

20 November 2018	Real Madrid (Spain)	89–76	(Spain) Herbalife Gran Canaria	Madrid
21:00	Scoring by quarter: 22–28, 25–15, 15–14, 27–19
	Pts: Randolph 20; Rebs: Randolph 10; Asts: five players 3 PIR: Randolph 26	Boxscore	Pts: Strawberry 20; Rebs: Báez, Balvín 5 Asts: Radičević 6 PIR: Báez 14	Arena: WiZink Center; Attendance: 7,328; Referees: Borys Ryzhyk, Matej Boltauzer, Ersan Kartal

21 November 2018	Khimki (Russia)	85–69	(Montenegro) Budućnost VOLI	Mytishchi
18:00	Scoring by quarter: 18–17, 27–13, 20–24, 20–15
	Pts: Shved 22; Rebs: Mickey 8 Asts: Shved 7 PIR: Shved 30	Boxscore	Pts: Clark 19; Rebs: Clarke 7 Asts: Gordić 7 PIR: Clarke, Jackson 15	Arena: Mytishchi Arena; Attendance: 3,573; Referees: Benjamín Jiménez, Seffi Shemmesh, Jurgis Laurinavicius

21 November 2018	CSKA Moscow (Russia)	99–97(OT)	(Lithuania) Žalgiris	Moscow
18:45	Scoring by quarter: 16–18, 21–20, 22–22, 27–26, Overtime: 13–11
	Pts: Rodríguez 24; Rebs: Clyburn 13; Asts: Rodríguez 6 PIR: Clyburn, Rodríguez 27	Boxscore	Pts: Kavaliauskas 19; Rebs: Kavaliauskas 8 Asts: Wolters 9 PIR: Kavaliauskas 26	Arena: Megasport Arena; Attendance: 6,922; Referees: Miguel Ángel Pérez Niz, Tomislav Hordov, Michele Rossi

21 November 2018	Panathinaikos OPAP (Greece)	76–70	(Spain) Barcelona Lassa	Athens
20:00	Scoring by quarter: 13–10, 21–15, 21–25, 21–20
	Pts: Thomas 14; Rebs: Calathes 9 Asts: Calathes 12; PIR: Lasme 16	Boxscore	Pts: Kuric 17; Rebs: four players 5 Asts: Heurtel 4 PIR: Séraphin 21	Arena: Olympic Sports Center; Attendance: 10,935; Referees: Robert Lottermoser, Sreten Radović, Oļegs Latiševs

21 November 2018	AX Armani Exchange Olimpia (Italy)	93–90	(Spain) Kirolbet Baskonia	Assago
20:45	Scoring by quarter: 27–26, 20–17, 26–25, 20–22
	Pts: Micov 22; Rebs: Brooks, Tarczewski 7 Asts: James 8 PIR: James 20	Boxscore	Pts: Janning, Poirier 18; Rebs: Poirier 10; Asts: Huertas, Vildoza 4 PIR: Poirier 30	Arena: Mediolanum Forum; Attendance: 7,754; Referees: Milivoje Jovčić, Fernando Rocha, Petri Mäntylä

=== Round 9 ===
22 November 2018	Darüşşafaka Tekfen (Turkey)	88–93	(Turkey) Anadolu Efes	Istanbul
18:15	Scoring by quarter: 23–19, 23–23, 14–32, 28–19
	Pts: Eric 18; Rebs: Kidd 6 Asts: McCallum 6 PIR: Eric 19	Boxscore	Pts: Beaubois 24; Rebs: Moerman 12; Asts: Micić 8 PIR: Beaubois 25	Arena: Volkswagen Arena; Attendance: 2,872; Referees: Matej Boltauzer, Elias Koromilas, Mykola Ambrosov

22 November 2018	Olympiacos (Greece)	88–83	(Spain) Real Madrid	Piraeus
19:45	Scoring by quarter: 29–22, 23–19, 13–24, 23–18
	Pts: Williams-Goss 23; Rebs: Milutinov 9 Asts: Williams-Goss 4 PIR: Milutinov, Williams-Goss 25	Boxscore	Pts: Carroll 16; Rebs: Tavares 10; Asts: Campazzo 13; PIR: Campazzo 24	Arena: Peace and Friendship Stadium; Attendance: 9,149; Referees: Sreten Radović, Oļegs Latiševs, Mario Majkić

22 November 2018	Maccabi Tel Aviv (Israel)	70–74	(Turkey) Fenerbahçe Beko	Tel Aviv
20:05	Scoring by quarter: 16–13, 25–23, 12–19, 17–19
	Pts: Caloiaro 17; Rebs: Caloiaro 8 Asts: three players 3 PIR: Caloiaro 24	Boxscore	Pts: Sloukas 18; Rebs: Lauvergne 8 Asts: Dixon 3 PIR: Sloukas 15	Arena: Menora Mivtachim Arena; Attendance: 9,817; Referees: Juan Carlos García González, Ioannis Foufis, Anne Panther

22 November 2018	Herbalife Gran Canaria (Spain)	74–89	(Germany) Bayern Munich	Las Palmas
21:30	Scoring by quarter: 17–21, 25–25, 20–15, 12–28
	Pts: Balvín, Eriksson 15; Rebs: Balvín 8 Asts: Radičević 4 PIR: Balvín 21	Boxscore	Pts: Lô 22; Rebs: Booker 11; Asts: Koponen, Lô 5 PIR: Lô 28	Arena: Gran Canaria Arena; Attendance: 3,872; Referees: Saša Pukl, Spiros Gkontas, Artūras Šukys

23 November 2018	Žalgiris (Lithuania)	83–84	(Russia) Khimki	Kaunas
18:45	Scoring by quarter: 26–19, 13–18, 18–21, 26–26
	Pts: Davies 23; Rebs: Davies 13; Asts: Davies 3 PIR: Davies 39	Boxscore	Pts: Shved 25; Rebs: Mickey 7 Asts: Shved 10; PIR: Shved 32	Arena: Žalgirio Arena; Attendance: 14,537; Referees: Damir Javor, Carmelo Paternicò, Jordi Aliaga

23 November 2018	Kirolbet Baskonia (Spain)	86–77	(Greece) Panathinaikos OPAP	Vitoria-Gasteiz
20:30	Scoring by quarter: 20–12, 24–20, 29–23, 13–22
	Pts: Shengelia 16; Rebs: Poirier 9 Asts: Shengelia 7 PIR: Shengelia 26	Boxscore	Pts: Langford 33; Rebs: Gist 6 Asts: Vougioukas 3 PIR: Langford 35	Arena: Fernando Buesa Arena; Attendance: 11,286; Referees: Luigi Lamonica, Borys Ryzhyk, Piotr Pastusiak

23 November 2018	Budućnost VOLI (Montenegro)	93–92	(Russia) CSKA Moscow	Podgorica
20:30	Scoring by quarter: 17–21, 18–28, 30–18, 28–25
	Pts: Clark 18; Rebs: Omić 5 Asts: Gordić 7 PIR: Clark 22	Boxscore	Pts: De Colo 19; Rebs: three players 4 Asts: De Colo 6 PIR: De Colo 27	Arena: Morača; Attendance: 5,083; Referees: Daniel Hierrezuelo, Mehdi Difallah, Eduard Udyanskyy

23 November 2018	Barcelona Lassa (Spain)	90–80	(Italy) AX Armani Exchange Olimpia	Barcelona
21:00	Scoring by quarter: 24–25, 29–17, 21–12, 16–26
	Pts: Heurtel 20; Rebs: Séraphin 7 Asts: Heurtel 6 PIR: Heurtel 25	Boxscore	Pts: James 19; Rebs: Brooks 7 Asts: James 10; PIR: James 23	Arena: Palau Blaugrana; Attendance: 5,239; Referees: Christos Christodoulou, Tomislav Hordov, Amit Balak

=== Round 10 ===
29 November 2018	Darüşşafaka Tekfen (Turkey)	71–75	(Spain) Herbalife Gran Canaria	Istanbul
18:15	Scoring by quarter: 25–22, 19–12, 12–23, 15–18
	Pts: McCallum 13; Rebs: three players 6 Asts: McCallum 7 PIR: McCallum 16	Boxscore	Pts: Eriksson 23; Rebs: Balvín 9 Asts: Oliver 8 PIR: Eriksson 22	Arena: Volkswagen Arena; Attendance: 1,994; Referees: Christos Christodoulou, Oļegs Latiševs, Mario Majkić

29 November 2018	Žalgiris (Lithuania)	83–78	(Italy) AX Armani Exchange Olimpia	Kaunas
19:00	Scoring by quarter: 18–23, 22–8, 20–27, 23–20
	Pts: Davies 27; Rebs: Davies 10; Asts: Wolters 7 PIR: Davies 35	Boxscore	Pts: James 17; Rebs: Gudaitis 7 Asts: James 7 PIR: Gudaitis 23	Arena: Žalgirio Arena; Attendance: 13,650; Referees: Daniel Hierrezuelo, Matej Boltauzer, Miloš Koljenšić

29 November 2018	Maccabi Tel Aviv (Israel)	95–71	(Germany) Bayern Munich	Tel Aviv
20:05	Scoring by quarter: 27–17, 20–12, 20–26, 28–16
	Pts: Roll 14; Rebs: O'Bryant 10; Asts: Kane, Wilbekin 5 PIR: Roll 21	Boxscore	Pts: Williams 15; Rebs: Lučić 7 Asts: Koponen 6 PIR: Lučić 19	Arena: Menora Mivtachim Arena; Attendance: 10,435; Referees: Ilija Belošević, Emilio Pérez Pizarro, Gytis Vilius

29 November 2018	Real Madrid (Spain)	88–93	(Russia) CSKA Moscow	Madrid
21:00	Scoring by quarter: 20–24, 21–14, 20–29, 27–26
	Pts: Campazzo 23; Rebs: Ayón 7 Asts: Ayón 4 PIR: Campazzo 24	Boxscore	Pts: Higgins 24; Rebs: Clyburn, Hunter 6 Asts: De Colo 5 PIR: Clyburn 27	Arena: WiZink Center; Attendance: 12,749; Referees: Saša Pukl, Fernando Rocha, Anne Panther

30 November 2018	Khimki (Russia)	76–68	(Greece) Panathinaikos OPAP	Mytishchi
18:00	Scoring by quarter: 29–25, 19–19, 11–7, 17–17
	Pts: Gill 21; Rebs: Jenkins 7 Asts: Bost 6 PIR: Gill 23	Boxscore	Pts: Gist 19; Rebs: Gist 9 Asts: Langford 5 PIR: Gist 25	Arena: Mytishchi Arena; Attendance: 5,796; Referees: Juan Carlos García González, Emin Moğulkoç, Milija Vojinović

30 November 2018	Anadolu Efes (Turkey)	96–85	(Spain) Kirolbet Baskonia	Istanbul
18:30	Scoring by quarter: 25–17, 19–25, 31–25, 21–18
	Pts: Micić, Motum 16; Rebs: Balbay 5 Asts: Beaubois, Micić 6 PIR: Beaubois 18	Boxscore	Pts: Janning 20; Rebs: Poirier 9 Asts: Granger 6 PIR: Janning 18	Arena: Sinan Erdem Dome; Attendance: 3,983; Referees: Robert Lottermoser, Damir Javor, Aare Halliko

30 November 2018	Olympiacos (Greece)	92–70	(Montenegro) Budućnost VOLI	Piraeus
20:30	Scoring by quarter: 25–20, 19–17, 32–14, 16–19
	Pts: LeDay 28; Rebs: LeDay, Printezis 8 Asts: Mantzaris 6 PIR: LeDay 42	Boxscore	Pts: Clark 15; Rebs: Clark, Clarke 5 Asts: Gordić 7 PIR: Gordić 19	Arena: Peace and Friendship Stadium; Attendance: 5,846; Referees: Miguel Ángel Pérez Niz, Piotr Pastusiak, Robert Vyklický

30 November 2018	Barcelona Lassa (Spain)	65–84	(Turkey) Fenerbahçe Beko	Barcelona
21:00	Scoring by quarter: 17–23, 19–22, 11–19, 18–20
	Pts: Hanga 16; Rebs: Hanga 6 Asts: Heurtel 4 PIR: Hanga 25	Boxscore	Pts: Dixon 16; Rebs: Veselý 8 Asts: Gudurić, Veselý 4 PIR: Gudurić 24	Arena: Palau Blaugrana; Attendance: 6,013; Referees: Luigi Lamonica, Elias Koromilas, Milan Nedović

=== Round 11 ===
6 December 2018	Budućnost VOLI (Montenegro)	67–64	(Spain) Barcelona Lassa	Podgorica
19:00	Scoring by quarter: 14–15, 17–18, 15–13, 21–18
	Pts: Clark, Gordić 12; Rebs: three players 5 Asts: Jackson 5 PIR: Clark 19	Boxscore	Pts: Hanga 12; Rebs: Singleton 10; Asts: Heurtel 4 PIR: Hanga 16	Arena: Morača; Attendance: 5,239; Referees: Borys Ryzhyk, Spiros Gkontas, Sašo Petek

6 December 2018	Darüşşafaka Tekfen (Turkey)	71–73	(Israel) Maccabi Tel Aviv	Istanbul
19:00	Scoring by quarter: 17–17, 25–19, 20–15, 9–22
	Pts: Eric 20; Rebs: three players 6 Asts: Douglas 6 PIR: Eric 19	Boxscore	Pts: DiBartolomeo 13; Rebs: O'Bryant 14; Asts: Ray 3 PIR: O'Bryant 20	Arena: Volkswagen Arena; Attendance: 1,922; Referees: Miguel Ángel Pérez Niz, Robert Vyklický, Clemens Fritz

6 December 2018	Žalgiris (Lithuania)	83–75	(Greece) Olympiacos	Kaunas
19:00	Scoring by quarter: 19–29, 21–19, 20–11, 23–16
	Pts: Grigonis 19; Rebs: Wolters 7 Asts: Wolters 6 PIR: White 19	Boxscore	Pts: Printezis 18; Rebs: Papanikolaou 6 Asts: Spanoulis 8 PIR: Printezis 17	Arena: Žalgirio Arena; Attendance: 14,385; Referees: Luigi Lamonica, Emilio Pérez Pizarro, Marcin Kowalski

6 December 2018	Bayern Munich (Germany)	72–65	(Russia) Khimki	Munich
20:30	Scoring by quarter: 16–16, 15–12, 23–22, 18–15
	Pts: Đedović 14; Rebs: four players 4 Asts: Jović 9 PIR: Đedović 18	Boxscore	Pts: Jenkins, Mickey 12; Rebs: Thomas 5 Asts: Marković 4 PIR: Thomas 14	Arena: Audi Dome; Attendance: 3,281; Referees: Sreten Radović, Carlos Peruga, Michele Rossi

6 December 2018	AX Armani Exchange Olimpia (Italy)	86–94	(Spain) Herbalife Gran Canaria	Assago
20:45	Scoring by quarter: 22–20, 18–28, 23–23, 23–23
	Pts: James 26; Rebs: Gudaitis 17; Asts: James 8 PIR: Gudaitis 32	Boxscore	Pts: Eriksson 17; Rebs: Tillie 6 Asts: Oliver 6 PIR: Eriksson 16	Arena: Mediolanum Forum; Attendance: 8,361; Referees: Robert Lottermoser, Elias Koromilas, Mehdi Difallah

7 December 2018	Anadolu Efes (Turkey)	82–84	(Spain) Real Madrid	Istanbul
18:30	Scoring by quarter: 23–23, 29–22, 22–15, 8–24
	Pts: Moerman 19; Rebs: Moerman 10; Asts: Micić 8 PIR: Moerman 33	Boxscore	Pts: Ayón 20; Rebs: Ayón 11; Asts: Thompkins 5 PIR: Ayón 34	Arena: Sinan Erdem Dome; Attendance: 12,289; Referees: Milivoje Jovčić, Piotr Pastusiak, Ioannis Foufis

7 December 2018	Kirolbet Baskonia (Spain)	76–73	(Russia) CSKA Moscow	Vitoria-Gasteiz
20:30	Scoring by quarter: 21–21, 19–17, 15–17, 21–18
	Pts: Poirier 18; Rebs: Poirier, Shengelia 8 Asts: Vildoza 5 PIR: Poirier 25	Boxscore	Pts: Peters 20; Rebs: Hines 7 Asts: De Colo, Rodríguez 5 PIR: Higgins 25	Arena: Fernando Buesa Arena; Attendance: 12,307; Referees: Ilija Belošević, Oļegs Latiševs, Carmelo Paternicò

7 December 2018	Panathinaikos OPAP (Greece)	69–81	(Turkey) Fenerbahçe Beko	Athens
20:30	Scoring by quarter: 12–18, 21–17, 19–21, 17–25
	Pts: Calathes 14; Rebs: Lojeski 7 Asts: Calathes 7 PIR: Lojeski 20	Boxscore	Pts: Kalinić 18; Rebs: Veselý 7 Asts: Veselý 7 PIR: Veselý 23	Arena: Olympic Sports Center; Attendance: 13,012; Referees: Matej Boltauzer, Benjamín Jiménez, Fernando Rocha

=== Round 12 ===
13 December 2018	Olympiacos (Greece)	88–81	(Turkey) Anadolu Efes	Piraeus
17:45	Scoring by quarter: 25–12, 23–34, 17–22, 23–13
	Pts: Toupane 19; Rebs: Printezis 11; Asts: Spanoulis 5 PIR: Milutinov 24	Boxscore	Pts: Micić 24; Rebs: Moerman 8 Asts: Micić 6 PIR: Micić, Moerman 22	Arena: Peace and Friendship Stadium; Attendance: 9,357; Referees: Daniel Hierrezuelo, Carmelo Paternicò, Tomislav Hordov

13 December 2018	CSKA Moscow (Russia)	88–74	(Russia) Khimki	Moscow
18:00	Scoring by quarter: 24–17, 25–23, 26–13, 13–21
	Pts: Hackett 14; Rebs: Clyburn 7 Asts: Hines, Rodríguez 5 PIR: Hackett 19	Boxscore	Pts: Marković 18; Rebs: three players 5 Asts: Bost 7 PIR: Thomas 23	Arena: Megasport Arena; Attendance: 7,562; Referees: Borys Ryzhyk, Benjamín Jiménez, Marko Juras

13 December 2018	Fenerbahçe Beko (Turkey)	92–85	(Italy) AX Armani Exchange Olimpia	Istanbul
19:30	Scoring by quarter: 15–21, 25–19, 27–18, 25–27
	Pts: Gudurić 20; Rebs: Kalinić, Veselý 5 Asts: Sloukas 7 PIR: Gudurić 25	Boxscore	Pts: James 31; Rebs: Tarczewski 10; Asts: James 6 PIR: James 30	Arena: Ülker Sports and Event Hall; Attendance: 11,463; Referees: Miguel Ángel Pérez Niz, Sreten Radović, Oļegs Latiševs

13 December 2018	Maccabi Tel Aviv (Israel)	79–81	(Spain) Kirolbet Baskonia	Tel Aviv
20:05	Scoring by quarter: 17–22, 24–14, 20–18, 18–27
	Pts: Kane, Wilbekin 13; Rebs: Tyus 7 Asts: Roll, Wilbekin 5 PIR: Kane 25	Boxscore	Pts: Shengelia 20; Rebs: Poirier 12; Asts: Shengelia 5 PIR: Shengelia 18	Arena: Menora Mivtachim Arena; Attendance: 10,551; Referees: Saša Pukl, Elias Koromilas, Artūras Šukys

13 December 2018	Real Madrid (Spain)	92–65	(Spain) Barcelona Lassa	Madrid
21:00	Scoring by quarter: 22–17, 31–13, 16–20, 23–15
	Pts: Thompkins 17; Rebs: Thompkins 7 Asts: Campazzo 6 PIR: Thompkins 20	Boxscore	Pts: Heurtel 16; Rebs: three players 4 Asts: Heurtel 5 PIR: Heurtel 14	Arena: WiZink Center; Attendance: 11,953; Referees: Ilija Belošević, Robert Lottermoser, Sérgio Silva

14 December 2018	Bayern Munich (Germany)	88–84	(Lithuania) Žalgiris	Munich
20:30	Scoring by quarter: 18–12, 28–26, 17–23, 25–23
	Pts: Williams 27; Rebs: Williams 7 Asts: Koponen 4 PIR: Williams 35	Boxscore	Pts: Davies 21; Rebs: Davies 6 Asts: Westermann 6 PIR: Davies 33	Arena: Audi Dome; Attendance: 3,445; Referees: Christos Christodoulou, Juan Carlos García González, Amit Balak

14 December 2018	Panathinaikos OPAP (Greece)	75–67	(Turkey) Darüşşafaka Tekfen	Athens
20:30	Scoring by quarter: 22–16, 21–16, 14–21, 18–14
	Pts: Mitoglou 20; Rebs: Mitoglou 6 Asts: Calathes 12; PIR: Mitoglou 27	Boxscore	Pts: Douglas 15; Rebs: Eric 10; Asts: three players 2 PIR: Evans 10	Arena: Olympic Sports Center; Attendance: 8,348; Referees: Milivoje Jovčić, Carlos Peruga, Seffi Shemmesh

14 December 2018	Herbalife Gran Canaria (Spain)	95–85	(Montenegro) Budućnost VOLI	Las Palmas
21:00	Scoring by quarter: 26–20, 30–14, 26–23, 13–28
	Pts: Eriksson 15; Rebs: Balvín 7 Asts: Radičević 11; PIR: Radičević 27	Boxscore	Pts: Jackson 15; Rebs: Nikolić 6 Asts: Gordić 6 PIR: Šehović 14	Arena: Gran Canaria Arena; Attendance: 4,985; Referees: Luigi Lamonica, Petri Mäntylä, Gytis Vilius

=== Round 13 ===
18 December 2018	Anadolu Efes (Turkey)	106–68	(Montenegro) Budućnost VOLI	Istanbul
18:00	Scoring by quarter: 29–20, 20–21, 32–12, 25–15
	Pts: Beaubois 22; Rebs: Motum, Simon 7 Asts: Micić, Simon 5 PIR: Simon 30	Boxscore	Pts: Clark 21; Rebs: three players 4 Asts: four players 4 PIR: Clark 13	Arena: Sinan Erdem Dome; Attendance: 3,153; Referees: Christos Christodoulou, Juan Carlos García González, Anne Panther

18 December 2018	Fenerbahçe Beko (Turkey)	79–75	(Russia) CSKA Moscow	Istanbul
18:45	Scoring by quarter: 18–26, 18–22, 24–14, 19–13
	Pts: Veselý 19; Rebs: Veselý 10; Asts: Sloukas 5 PIR: Veselý 33	Boxscore	Pts: Clyburn 17; Rebs: Clyburn 5 Asts: Rodríguez 4 PIR: Clyburn 26	Arena: Ülker Sports and Event Hall; Attendance: 12,119; Referees: Daniel Hierrezuelo, Robert Lottermoser, Mehdi Difallah

18 December 2018	Barcelona Lassa (Spain)	60–69	(Greece) Olympiacos	Barcelona
20:45	Scoring by quarter: 14–17, 16–15, 18–23, 12–14
	Pts: Claver 13; Rebs: Oriola 6 Asts: Heurtel 3 PIR: Claver 15	Boxscore	Pts: Milutinov 18; Rebs: Milutinov 14; Asts: Williams-Goss 4 PIR: Milutinov 36	Arena: Palau Blaugrana; Attendance: 4,954; Referees: Sreten Radović, Oļegs Latiševs, Gytis Vilius

18 December 2018	Herbalife Gran Canaria (Spain)	71–84	(Spain) Kirolbet Baskonia	Las Palmas
21:30	Scoring by quarter: 27–22, 8–19, 18–27, 18–16
	Pts: Tillie 11; Rebs: Báez, Balvín 5 Asts: Oliver 6 PIR: Báez 12	Boxscore	Pts: Janning, Shields 16; Rebs: Poirier 12; Asts: Vildoza 6 PIR: Vildoza 21	Arena: Gran Canaria Arena; Attendance: 4,121; Referees: Fernando Rocha, Piotr Pastusiak, Sašo Petek

19 December 2018	Darüşşafaka Tekfen (Turkey)	71–75	(Lithuania) Žalgiris	Istanbul
18:15	Scoring by quarter: 19–15, 20–18, 14–16, 18–26
	Pts: McCallum 17; Rebs: Eric 6 Asts: Brown, Diebler 4 PIR: Brown, Diebler 14	Boxscore	Pts: Davies 17; Rebs: White 6 Asts: Davies, Milaknis 3 PIR: Davies, White 17	Arena: Volkswagen Arena; Attendance: 1,999; Referees: Carmelo Paternicò, Carlos Cortés, Ioannis Foufis

19 December 2018	Maccabi Tel Aviv (Israel)	79–63	(Russia) Khimki	Tel Aviv
20:05	Scoring by quarter: 16–18, 19–13, 26–11, 18–21
	Pts: Ray 17; Rebs: Black 9 Asts: Roll 5 PIR: Ray 19	Boxscore	Pts: Mickey 15; Rebs: Mickey, Thomas 7 Asts: Marković 7 PIR: Mickey 15	Arena: Menora Mivtachim Arena; Attendance: 10,655; Referees: Luigi Lamonica, Milivoje Jovčić, Rain Peerandi

19 December 2018	AX Armani Exchange Olimpia (Italy)	78–80	(Germany) Bayern Munich	Assago
20:45	Scoring by quarter: 16–15, 24–26, 17–17, 21–22
	Pts: James 17; Rebs: Gudaitis 8 Asts: James 8 PIR: Micov 24	Boxscore	Pts: Williams 21; Rebs: Đedović, Williams 6 Asts: Jović 4 PIR: Williams 30	Arena: Mediolanum Forum; Attendance: 6,596; Referees: Saša Pukl, Benjamín Jiménez, Sérgio Silva

19 December 2018	Real Madrid (Spain)	89–68	(Greece) Panathinaikos OPAP	Madrid
21:00	Scoring by quarter: 23–10, 20–21, 20–24, 26–13
	Pts: Causeur 14; Rebs: Ayón 9 Asts: Ayón, Campazzo 5 PIR: Ayón 21	Boxscore	Pts: Langford 20; Rebs: Lojeski 6 Asts: Calathes 4 PIR: Langford 20	Arena: WiZink Center; Attendance: 9,749; Referees: Borys Ryzhyk, Damir Javor, Tomislav Hordov

=== Round 14 ===
20 December 2018	CSKA Moscow (Russia)	102–84	(Turkey) Anadolu Efes	Moscow
18:00	Scoring by quarter: 31–24, 25–30, 21–14, 25–16
	Pts: Clyburn 24; Rebs: Clyburn 11; Asts: De Colo, Hackett 6 PIR: De Colo 30	Boxscore	Pts: Beaubois 24; Rebs: Dunston 5 Asts: Micić 5 PIR: Beaubois, Motum 21	Arena: Megasport Arena; Attendance: 6,316; Referees: Carlos Peruga, Mario Majkić, Gytis Vilius

20 December 2018	Budućnost VOLI (Montenegro)	65–89	(Turkey) Fenerbahçe Beko	Podgorica
20:00	Scoring by quarter: 20–26, 20–14, 15–27, 10–22
	Pts: Clark 15; Rebs: Omić 6 Asts: three players 4 PIR: Clarke 14	Boxscore	Pts: Veselý 19; Rebs: Veselý 9 Asts: Dixon, Lauvergne 3 PIR: Veselý 29	Arena: Morača; Attendance: 5,255; Referees: Elias Koromilas, Seffi Shemmesh, Jordi Aliaga

20 December 2018	Olympiacos (Greece)	98–77	(Spain) Herbalife Gran Canaria	Piraeus
20:00	Scoring by quarter: 20–14, 32–19, 21– 21, 25–23
	Pts: Spanoulis 21; Rebs: Milutinov, Vezenkov 6 Asts: Spanoulis 8 PIR: Spanoulis 31	Boxscore	Pts: Vene 15; Rebs: Strawberry, Vene 4 Asts: Oliver 5 PIR: Vene 17	Arena: Peace and Friendship Stadium; Attendance: 6,762; Referees: Matej Boltauzer, Milija Vojinović, Robert Vyklický

20 December 2018	Kirolbet Baskonia (Spain)	70–77	(Spain) Barcelona Lassa	Vitoria-Gasteiz
21:00	Scoring by quarter: 16–19, 23–23, 16–7, 15–28
	Pts: Janning 19; Rebs: Janning, Poirier 6 Asts: Huertas 4 PIR: Janning 19	Boxscore	Pts: Pangos 16; Rebs: Claver 6 Asts: Heurtel 6 PIR: Heurtel 17	Arena: Fernando Buesa Arena; Attendance: 11,018; Referees: Christos Christodoulou, Petri Mäntylä, Milan Nedović

21 December 2018	Khimki (Russia)	85–84	(Turkey) Darüşşafaka Tekfen	Mytishchi
18:00	Scoring by quarter: 30–18, 15–25, 24–14, 16–27
	Pts: Bost 19; Rebs: Thomas 9 Asts: Marković, Vyaltsev 4 PIR: Zubkov 23	Boxscore	Pts: Eric, McCallum 13; Rebs: Evans 5 Asts: Douglas 6 PIR: three players 14	Arena: Mytishchi Arena; Attendance: 3,259; Referees: Daniel Hierrezuelo, Ilija Belošević, Joseph Bissang

21 December 2018	Žalgiris (Lithuania)	80–73	(Israel) Maccabi Tel Aviv	Kaunas
19:00	Scoring by quarter: 16–16, 23–17, 20–20, 21–20
	Pts: Milaknis 16; Rebs: White 7 Asts: Walton 5 PIR: Milaknis 18	Boxscore	Pts: Wilbekin 20; Rebs: Kane 5 Asts: Caloiaro 5 PIR: O'Bryant 20	Arena: Žalgirio Arena; Attendance: 15,168; Referees: Robert Lottermoser, Oļegs Latiševs, Benjamín Jiménez

21 December 2018	Panathinaikos OPAP (Greece)	83–86	(Italy) AX Armani Exchange Olimpia	Athens
20:00	Scoring by quarter: 23–21, 17–26, 16–17, 27–22
	Pts: Calathes 24; Rebs: Gist 7 Asts: Calathes 11; PIR: Calathes 23	Boxscore	Pts: Gudaitis 20; Rebs: Gudaitis 8 Asts: James 8 PIR: Gudaitis 28	Arena: Olympic Sports Center; Attendance: 9,052; Referees: Juan Carlos García González, Emin Moğulkoç, Piotr Pastusiak

21 December 2018	Bayern Munich (Germany)	72–82	(Spain) Real Madrid	Munich
21:00	Scoring by quarter: 16–27, 15–19, 28–19, 13–17
	Pts: Jović 11; Rebs: Barthel 6 Asts: Jović 5 PIR: Jović 15	Boxscore	Pts: Randolph 22; Rebs: Thompkins 6 Asts: Ayón 8 PIR: Randolph 25	Arena: Audi Dome; Attendance: 5,414; Referees: Luigi Lamonica, Fernando Rocha, Mykola Ambrosov

=== Round 15 ===
27 December 2018	Khimki (Russia)	77–85	(Spain) Kirolbet Baskonia	Mytishchi
18:00	Scoring by quarter: 19–27, 17–16, 22–14, 19–28
	Pts: Mickey 19; Rebs: four players 4 Asts: Marković 6 PIR: Mickey 27	Boxscore	Pts: Shields 15; Rebs: four players 4 Asts: Huertas 10; PIR: Shields 18	Arena: Mytishchi Arena; Attendance: 3,911; Referees: Damir Javor, Mehdi Difallah, Josip Radojkovic

27 December 2018	Darüşşafaka Tekfen (Turkey)	79–75	(Greece) Olympiacos	Istanbul
18:15	Scoring by quarter: 24–12, 18–19, 18–22, 19–22
	Pts: Douglas 19; Rebs: Evans 10; Asts: Douglas 9 PIR: Douglas 30	Boxscore	Pts: Strēlnieks 15; Rebs: Milutinov, Printezis 9 Asts: Williams-Goss 5 PIR: Strēlnieks 17	Arena: Volkswagen Arena; Attendance: 2,475; Referees: Juan Carlos García González, Fernando Rocha, Renaud Geller

27 December 2018	Maccabi Tel Aviv (Israel)	94–92	(Italy) AX Armani Exchange Olimpia	Tel Aviv
20:05	Scoring by quarter: 21–24, 25–24, 29–27, 19–17
	Pts: O'Bryant 32; Rebs: Tyus 7 Asts: Roll 5 PIR: O'Bryant 44	Boxscore	Pts: Nedović 17; Rebs: Micov 8 Asts: James 8 PIR: Micov 25	Arena: Menora Mivtachim Arena; Attendance: 10,653; Referees: Daniel Hierrezuelo, Tomislav Hordov, Sašo Petek

27 December 2018	Barcelona Lassa (Spain)	80–65	(Turkey) Anadolu Efes	Barcelona
21:00	Scoring by quarter: 23–29, 16–21, 20–7, 21–8
	Pts: Oriola 14; Rebs: Séraphin 8 Asts: Pangos 5 PIR: four players 15	Boxscore	Pts: Motum 13; Rebs: Motum, Simon 6 Asts: Micić 7 PIR: Dunston 15	Arena: Palau Blaugrana; Attendance: 5,969; Referees: Saša Pukl, Borys Ryzhyk, Tomasz Trawicki

28 December 2018	Fenerbahçe Beko (Turkey)	65–63	(Spain) Real Madrid	Istanbul
18:30	Scoring by quarter: 22–12, 10–20, 16–12, 17–19
	Pts: Datome 17; Rebs: Melli 8 Asts: Gudurić 4 PIR: Datome 20	Boxscore	Pts: Fernández 12; Rebs: Ayón 6 Asts: Campazzo 6 PIR: Randolph 12	Arena: Ülker Sports and Event Hall; Attendance: 12,722; Referees: Christos Christodoulou, Carmelo Paternicò, Milan Nedović

28 December 2018	Panathinaikos OPAP (Greece)	96–84	(Russia) CSKA Moscow	Athens
20:00	Scoring by quarter: 19–26, 36–18, 17–18, 24–22
	Pts: Papapetrou 17; Rebs: Lasme 9 Asts: Calathes 10; PIR: Calathes 26	Boxscore	Pts: Clyburn 24; Rebs: Clyburn 10; Asts: Hines 4 PIR: Clyburn 33	Arena: Olympic Sports Center; Attendance: 15,733; Referees: Ilija Belošević, Matej Boltauzer, Oļegs Latiševs

28 December 2018	Bayern Munich (Germany)	93–88	(Montenegro) Budućnost VOLI	Munich
20:30	Scoring by quarter: 14–21, 24–28, 27–21, 28–18
	Pts: Williams 21; Rebs: Lučić 6 Asts: Barthel 4 PIR: Williams 20	Boxscore	Pts: Cole 27; Rebs: three players 7 Asts: Cole 6 PIR: Cole 30	Arena: Audi Dome; Attendance: 5,809; Referees: Emin Moğulkoç, Carlos Peruga, Jakub Zamojski

28 December 2018	Herbalife Gran Canaria (Spain)	73–66	(Lithuania) Žalgiris	Las Palmas
21:00	Scoring by quarter: 20–17, 16–9, 21–24, 16–16
	Pts: Rabaseda 15; Rebs: Rabaseda 8 Asts: Oliver 5 PIR: Rabaseda 27	Boxscore	Pts: Milaknis 13; Rebs: Davies 9 Asts: Walton 5 PIR: Walton 17	Arena: Gran Canaria Arena; Attendance: 5,173; Referees: Sreten Radović, Spiros Gkontas, Joseph Bissang

=== Round 16 ===
3 January 2019	Anadolu Efes (Turkey)	92–77	(Germany) Bayern Munich	Istanbul
18:30	Scoring by quarter: 27–18, 28–18, 15–18, 22–23
	Pts: Micić 20; Rebs: Moerman 7 Asts: Simon 9 PIR: Micić 29	Boxscore	Pts: Lučić 14; Rebs: Lučić 7 Asts: Hobbs 5 PIR: Lučić 20	Arena: Sinan Erdem Dome; Attendance: 5,056; Referees: Ilija Belošević, Joseph Bissang, Jordi Aliaga

3 January 2019	Real Madrid (Spain)	91–79	(Israel) Maccabi Tel Aviv	Madrid
20:45	Scoring by quarter: 21–19, 23–25, 25–18, 22–17
	Pts: Ayón 18; Rebs: Ayón 9 Asts: Llull 10; PIR: Ayón 31	Boxscore	Pts: Roll 23; Rebs: Tyus 8 Asts: Roll 5 PIR: Roll 26	Arena: WiZink Center; Attendance: 9,915; Referees: Matej Boltauzer, Sreten Radović, Uroš Obrknežević

3 January 2019	AX Armani Exchange Olimpia (Italy)	111–94	(Montenegro) Budućnost VOLI	Assago
20:45	Scoring by quarter: 36–22, 20–23, 26–21, 29–28
	Pts: Micov 20; Rebs: Gudaitis 12; Asts: James 8 PIR: Gudaitis 26	Boxscore	Pts: Bitadze 23; Rebs: Bitadze 8 Asts: Cole 7 PIR: Bitadze 31	Arena: Mediolanum Forum; Attendance: 7,865; Referees: Fernando Rocha, Petri Mäntylä, Aare Halliko

3 January 2019	Herbalife Gran Canaria (Spain)	70–99	(Russia) Khimki	Las Palmas
21:30	Scoring by quarter: 30–23, 6–27, 14–23, 20–26
	Pts: Eriksson 14; Rebs: Balvín, Rabaseda 4 Asts: Oliver 6 PIR: Eriksson 10	Boxscore	Pts: Bost 20; Rebs: four players 4 Asts: Marković 9 PIR: Mickey 22	Arena: Gran Canaria Arena; Attendance: 4,823; Referees: Saša Pukl, Carmelo Paternicò, Elias Koromilas

4 January 2019	Fenerbahçe Beko (Turkey)	96–87	(Spain) Kirolbet Baskonia	Istanbul
18:45	Scoring by quarter: 27–25, 21–16, 27–24, 21–22
	Pts: Melli 19; Rebs: Gudurić, Melli 4 Asts: Sloukas 6 PIR: Sloukas, Veselý 22	Boxscore	Pts: Shields 22; Rebs: Voigtmann 13; Asts: Huertas 6 PIR: Shields, Voigtmann 22	Arena: Ülker Sports and Event Hall; Attendance: 11,030; Referees: Luigi Lamonica, Borys Ryzhyk, Gytis Vilius

4 January 2019	Žalgiris (Lithuania)	79–84	(Russia) CSKA Moscow	Kaunas
19:00	Scoring by quarter: 17–28, 17–16, 25–11, 20–29
	Pts: Davies 19; Rebs: Davies, White 7 Asts: Grigonis, Walton 3 PIR: Davies 21	Boxscore	Pts: Clyburn, Hackett 19; Rebs: Vorontsevich 6 Asts: three players 3 PIR: Clyburn 24	Arena: Žalgirio Arena; Attendance: 15,205; Referees: Damir Javor, Juan Carlos García González, Michele Rossi

4 January 2019	Olympiacos (Greece)	79–65	(Greece) Panathinaikos OPAP	Piraeus
20:00	Scoring by quarter: 16–14, 25–11, 18–15, 20–25
	Pts: Milutinov, Strēlnieks 18; Rebs: Milutinov 18; Asts: Williams-Goss 5 PIR: Milutinov 41	Boxscore	Pts: Calathes 13; Rebs: Mitoglou 5 Asts: Calathes 7 PIR: Calathes 10	Arena: Peace and Friendship Stadium; Attendance: 11,107; Referees: Robert Lottermoser, Milivoje Jovčić, Milan Nedović

4 January 2019	Barcelona Lassa (Spain)	97–65	(Turkey) Darüşşafaka Tekfen	Barcelona
21:00	Scoring by quarter: 29–16, 25–11, 19–18, 24–20
	Pts: Heurtel 18; Rebs: Hanga 7 Asts: Heurtel 4 PIR: Heurtel 26	Boxscore	Pts: Douglas 23; Rebs: Douglas 6 Asts: McCallum 4 PIR: Douglas 14	Arena: Palau Blaugrana; Attendance: 6,008; Referees: Elias Koromilas, Tomislav Hordov, Mehdi Difallah

=== Round 17 ===
8 January 2019	Khimki (Russia)	84–78(OT)	(Turkey) Fenerbahçe Beko	Mytishchi
18:00	Scoring by quarter: 13–23, 25–18, 19–13, 15–18, Overtime: 12–6
	Pts: Marković 13; Rebs: Gill, Marković 7 Asts: Bost 5 PIR: Gill 19	Boxscore	Pts: Mahmutoğlu 18; Rebs: Melli 8 Asts: Gudurić, Melli 5 PIR: Melli 25	Arena: Mytishchi Arena; Attendance: 6,759; Referees: Juan Carlos García González, Sreten Radović, Piotr Pastusiak

8 January 2019	Žalgiris (Lithuania)	58–79	(Turkey) Anadolu Efes	Kaunas
19:30	Scoring by quarter: 14–16, 15–24, 16–23, 13–16
	Pts: Grigonis 9 Rebs: White 5 Asts: Grigonis 3 PIR: Walkup, White 8	Boxscore	Pts: Moerman 23; Rebs: Moerman 6 Asts: three players 4 PIR: Moerman 23	Arena: Žalgirio Arena; Attendance: 14,738; Referees: Daniel Hierrezuelo, Fernando Rocha, Anne Panther

8 January 2019	Olympiacos (Greece)	91–87(OT)	(Spain) Kirolbet Baskonia	Piraeus
20:00	Scoring by quarter: 20–22, 23–25, 12–15, 25–18, Overtime: 11–7
	Pts: LeDay 23; Rebs: LeDay 9 Asts: Williams-Goss 6 PIR: Papanikolaou 31	Boxscore	Pts: Vildoza 19; Rebs: Poirier 12; Asts: Janning, Huertas 5 PIR: Poirier 25	Arena: Peace and Friendship Stadium; Attendance: 7,078; Referees: Ilija Belošević, Oļegs Latiševs, Rain Peerandi

8 January 2019	Herbalife Gran Canaria (Spain)	67–75	(Spain) Real Madrid	Las Palmas
21:30	Scoring by quarter: 15–16, 19–11, 22–25, 11–23
	Pts: Báez, Oliver 12; Rebs: Balvín 8 Asts: Magette, Oliver 4 PIR: Oliver 16	Boxscore	Pts: Llull 16; Rebs: Ayón 6 Asts: Llull 4 PIR: Llull 18	Arena: Gran Canaria Arena; Attendance: 5,214; Referees: Robert Lottermoser, Sašo Petek, Saulius Racys

9 January 2019	Darüşşafaka Tekfen (Turkey)	65–80	(Russia) CSKA Moscow	Istanbul
18:15	Scoring by quarter: 16–25, 18–19, 15–16, 16–20
	Pts: Özmızrak 13; Rebs: Evans 7 Asts: Peiners 3 PIR: Evans, Özmızrak 12	Boxscore	Pts: De Colo 17; Rebs: Clyburn 7 Asts: Rodríguez 6 PIR: De Colo 19	Arena: Volkswagen Arena; Attendance: 3,026; Referees: Luigi Lamonica, Benjamín Jiménez, Jakub Zamojski

9 January 2019	Panathinaikos OPAP (Greece)	77–67	(Germany) Bayern Munich	Athens
20:00	Scoring by quarter: 22–11, 21–21, 16–18, 18–17
	Pts: Papapetrou 18; Rebs: Papapetrou 8 Asts: Calathes 11; PIR: Calathes 29	Boxscore	Pts: Williams 21; Rebs: Barthel 6 Asts: Đedović 7 PIR: Williams 19	Arena: Olympic Sports Center; Attendance: 9,319; Referees: Borys Ryzhyk, Emilio Pérez Pizarro, Tomasz Trawicki

9 January 2019	Maccabi Tel Aviv (Israel)	81–76	(Montenegro) Budućnost VOLI	Tel Aviv
20:05	Scoring by quarter: 12–18, 22–19, 25–23, 22–16
	Pts: Wilbekin 16; Rebs: Black 7 Asts: three players 2 PIR: Black 19	Boxscore	Pts: Cole 25; Rebs: Bitadze 8 Asts: three players 2 PIR: Cole 27	Arena: Menora Mivtachim Arena; Attendance: 9,476; Referees: Miguel Ángel Pérez Niz, Carmelo Paternicò, Sinan Işgüder

9 January 2019	AX Armani Exchange Olimpia (Italy)	85–90	(Spain) Barcelona Lassa	Assago
20:45	Scoring by quarter: 16–17, 21–19, 20–29, 28–25
	Pts: James, Micov 20; Rebs: Gudaitis, James 7 Asts: James 8 PIR: James 33	Boxscore	Pts: Heurtel 21; Rebs: Tomić 8 Asts: Heurtel, Ribas 6 PIR: Heurtel 27	Arena: Mediolanum Forum; Attendance: 8,190; Referees: Matej Boltauzer, Milivoje Jovčić, Joseph Bissang

=== Round 18 ===
10 January 2019	Anadolu Efes (Turkey)	81–72	(Russia) Khimki	Istanbul
18:00	Scoring by quarter: 23–16, 13–18, 26–17, 19–21
	Pts: Micić 16; Rebs: Moerman 9 Asts: Micić 8 PIR: Micić 21	Boxscore	Pts: Mickey 14; Rebs: Mickey 9 Asts: Bost 3 PIR: Mickey 21	Arena: Sinan Erdem Dome; Attendance: 4,230; Referees: Luigi Lamonica, Petri Mäntylä, Marcin Kowalski

10 January 2019	Fenerbahçe Beko (Turkey)	78–61	(Lithuania) Žalgiris	Istanbul
18:45	Scoring by quarter: 19–11, 24–18, 14–15, 21–17
	Pts: Mahmutoğlu, Sloukas 14; Rebs: Veselý 12; Asts: Sloukas 6 PIR: Veselý 26	Boxscore	Pts: Davies 12; Rebs: Jankūnas 5 Asts: Ulanovas 3 PIR: Jankūnas 13	Arena: Ülker Sports and Event Hall; Attendance: 10,462; Referees: Robert Lottermoser, Benjamín Jiménez, Mario Majkić

10 January 2019	Real Madrid (Spain)	94–78	(Greece) Olympiacos	Madrid
21:00	Scoring by quarter: 28–23, 26–23, 18–17, 22–15
	Pts: Randolph 16; Rebs: Randolph 8 Asts: Campazzo, Taylor 5 PIR: Randolph 26	Boxscore	Pts: LeDay 15; Rebs: LeDay 8 Asts: Spanoulis 11; PIR: Spanoulis 18	Arena: WiZink Center; Attendance: 10,860; Referees: Damir Javor, Piotr Pastusiak, Mehdi Difallah

11 January 2019	CSKA Moscow (Russia)	76–93	(Israel) Maccabi Tel Aviv	Moscow
18:00	Scoring by quarter: 24–22, 17–24, 21–18, 14–29
	Pts: Clyburn, De Colo 16; Rebs: Hunter 9 Asts: De Colo 6 PIR: Hunter 17	Boxscore	Pts: Zoosman 15; Rebs: Tyus, Zoosman 6 Asts: DiBartolomeo, Kane 4 PIR: Zoosman 22	Arena: Megasport Arena; Attendance: 5,645; Referees: Saša Pukl, Borys Ryzhyk, Milija Vojinović

11 January 2019	Budućnost VOLI (Montenegro)	75–74	(Turkey) Darüşşafaka Tekfen	Podgorica
19:00	Scoring by quarter: 16–14, 20–28, 22–11, 17–21
	Pts: Jackson 18; Rebs: Šehović 6 Asts: Cole, Gordić 2 PIR: Jackson 22	Boxscore	Pts: Douglas 14; Rebs: Evans 7 Asts: Douglas 9 PIR: Evans 18	Arena: Morača; Attendance: 4,081; Referees: Oļegs Latiševs, Daniel Hierrezuelo, Anne Panther

11 January 2019	Kirolbet Baskonia (Spain)	83–66	(Spain) Herbalife Gran Canaria	Vitoria-Gasteiz
20:30	Scoring by quarter: 16–23, 23–19, 16–9, 28–15
	Pts: Huertas 24; Rebs: Diop 10; Asts: Vildoza 7 PIR: Huertas 29	Boxscore	Pts: Balvín 16; Rebs: three players 5 Asts: Magette, Oliver 5 PIR: Balvín 17	Arena: Fernando Buesa Arena; Attendance: 9,812; Referees: Christos Christodoulou, Fernando Rocha, Milan Nedovi

11 January 2019	Bayern Munich (Germany)	93–87	(Italy) AX Armani Exchange Olimpia	Munich
20:30	Scoring by quarter: 23–22, 30–23, 24–23, 16–19
	Pts: Đedović, Lô 18; Rebs: Williams 6 Asts: Lô 5 PIR: Đedović 22	Boxscore	Pts: James 29; Rebs: Gudaitis 10; Asts: James 5 PIR: James 31	Arena: Audi Dome; Attendance: 4,080; Referees: Juan Carlos García González, Ioannis Foufis, Artūras Šukys

11 January 2019	Barcelona Lassa (Spain)	79–68	(Greece) Panathinaikos OPAP	Barcelona
21:00	Scoring by quarter: 17–13, 20–23, 19–16, 23–16
	Pts: Heurtel 23; Rebs: Tomić 8 Asts: three players 3 PIR: Heurtel 22	Boxscore	Pts: Papapetrou 17; Rebs: Gist 4 Asts: Calathes 5 PIR: Papapetrou 20	Arena: Palau Blaugrana; Attendance: 5,934; Referees: Sreten Radović, Carmelo Paternicò, Emin Moğulkoç

=== Round 19 ===
17 January 2019	CSKA Moscow (Russia)	77–70	(Germany) Bayern Munich	Moscow
18:00	Scoring by quarter: 13–20, 22–17, 17–20, 25–13
	Pts: Clyburn 20; Rebs: Clyburn 8 Asts: Rodríguez 6 PIR: Clyburn 27	Boxscore	Pts: Đedović, Koponen 12; Rebs: Williams 7 Asts: Lô 5 PIR: Williams 16	Arena: Megasport Arena; Attendance: 5,297; Referees: Matej Boltauzer, Carlos Cortés, Uroš Nikolić

17 January 2019	Olympiacos (Greece)	71–57	(Russia) Khimki	Piraeus
20:00	Scoring by quarter: 20–11, 12–11, 23–14, 16–21
	Pts: Papanikolaou, Vezenkov 14; Rebs: Printezis 8 Asts: Spanoulis 9 PIR: Milutinov 25	Boxscore	Pts: Mickey 21; Rebs: Mickey 7 Asts: Marković 5 PIR: Mickey 22	Arena: Peace and Friendship Stadium; Attendance: 7,499; Referees: Miguel Ángel Pérez Niz, Fernando Rocha, Anne Panther

17 January 2019	Maccabi Tel Aviv (Israel)	99–83	(Spain) Barcelona Lassa	Tel Aviv
20:05	Scoring by quarter: 23–20, 34–15, 28–17, 14–31
	Pts: Black 16; Rebs: O'Bryant 7 Asts: Kane 5 PIR: Black 24	Boxscore	Pts: Ribas 13; Rebs: Blažič 6 Asts: Ribas 5 PIR: Ribas 17	Arena: Menora Mivtachim Arena; Attendance: 11,011; Referees: Damir Javor, Piotr Pastusiak, Gytis Vilius

17 January 2019	Herbalife Gran Canaria (Spain)	64–82	(Turkey) Fenerbahçe Beko	Las Palmas
21:00	Scoring by quarter: 19–24, 13–20, 19–12, 13–26
	Pts: Tillie 21; Rebs: Pasečņiks 6 Asts: Oliver 5 PIR: Tillie 24	Boxscore	Pts: Kalinić 16; Rebs: Veselý 7 Asts: Sloukas 6 PIR: Veselý 24	Arena: Gran Canaria Arena; Attendance: 4,669; Referees: Milivoje Jovčić, Oļegs Latiševs, Mario Majkić

18 January 2019	Anadolu Efes (Turkey)	82–68	(Turkey) Darüşşafaka Tekfen	Istanbul
18:30	Scoring by quarter: 21–14, 24–11, 21–20, 16–23
	Pts: Moerman 15; Rebs: Moerman 6 Asts: Larkin 4 PIR: Moerman 24	Boxscore	Pts: Douglas 17; Rebs: Evans, Savas 5 Asts: Özmızrak 4 PIR: Evans 17	Arena: Sinan Erdem Dome; Attendance: 4,844; Referees: Saša Pukl, Juan Carlos García González, Igor Dragojević

18 January 2019	Budućnost VOLI (Montenegro)	73–60	(Spain) Real Madrid	Podgorica
19:00	Scoring by quarter: 19–15, 17–13, 20–20, 17–12
	Pts: Cole 14; Rebs: Clarke 12; Asts: Cole 7 PIR: Clarke 25	Boxscore	Pts: Llull 10; Rebs: Llull 6 Asts: Campazzo 4 PIR: Campazzo 10	Arena: Morača; Attendance: 5,260; Referees: Christos Christodoulou, Jakub Zamojski, Ingus Baumanis

18 January 2019	Žalgiris (Lithuania)	82–69	(Greece) Panathinaikos OPAP	Kaunas
19:00	Scoring by quarter: 13–19, 20–18, 19–14, 30–18
	Pts: White 15; Rebs: Jankūnas 5 Asts: Walton 4 PIR: White 22	Boxscore	Pts: Thomas 14; Rebs: Mitoglou 6 Asts: Calathes 6 PIR: Calathes 14	Arena: Žalgirio Arena; Attendance: 15,140; Referees: Luigi Lamonica, Ilija Belošević, Carlos Peruga

18 January 2019	Kirolbet Baskonia (Spain)	80–75	(Italy) AX Armani Exchange Olimpia	Vitoria-Gasteiz
21:00	Scoring by quarter: 16–21, 26–28, 20–10, 18–16
	Pts: Poirier 17; Rebs: Voigtmann 10; Asts: Vildoza 12; PIR: Poirier 26	Boxscore	Pts: James 27; Rebs: James 7 Asts: James, Jerrells 5 PIR: James 34	Arena: Fernando Buesa Arena; Attendance: 10,626; Referees: Robert Lottermoser, Emin Moğulkoç, Mehdi Difallah

=== Round 20 ===
24 January 2019	Fenerbahçe Beko (Turkey)	90–75	(Greece) Olympiacos	Istanbul
18:30	Scoring by quarter: 21–15, 19–13, 28–26, 22–21
	Pts: Green 17; Rebs: four players 3 Asts: Dixon 10; PIR: Dixon 21	Boxscore	Pts: Timma 14; Rebs: Milutinov, Strēlnieks 4 Asts: three players 4 PIR: Strēlnieks 18	Arena: Ülker Sports and Event Hall; Attendance: 12,821; Referees: Luigi Lamonica, Matej Boltauzer, Carlos Peruga

24 January 2019	Maccabi Tel Aviv (Israel)	84–75	(Greece) Panathinaikos OPAP	Tel Aviv
20:30	Scoring by quarter: 16–17, 24–18, 22–19, 22–21
	Pts: Caloiaro 20; Rebs: Caloiaro 11; Asts: Zoosman 5 PIR: Caloiaro 33	Boxscore	Pts: Calathes, Lojeski 14; Rebs: Thomas 8 Asts: Calathes 10; PIR: Lojeski 18	Arena: Menora Mivtachim Arena; Attendance: 10,937; Referees: Robert Lottermoser, Oļegs Latiševs, Jakub Zamojski

24 January 2019	AX Armani Exchange Olimpia (Italy)	80–70	(Lithuania) Žalgiris	Assago
20:45	Scoring by quarter: 21–13, 13–17, 18–20, 28–20
	Pts: James 20; Rebs: Brooks 7 Asts: James 9 PIR: James 28	Boxscore	Pts: Wolters 17; Rebs: Davies 7 Asts: Wolters 5 PIR: Jankūnas 15	Arena: Mediolanum Forum; Attendance: 8,383; Referees: Christos Christodoulou, Sreten Radović, Emilio Pérez Pizarro

24 January 2019	Real Madrid (Spain)	92–84	(Turkey) Anadolu Efes	Madrid
21:00	Scoring by quarter: 21–21, 21–21, 22–19, 28–23
	Pts: Randolph 24; Rebs: Llull 8 Asts: three players 5 PIR: Randolph 28	Boxscore	Pts: Micić 21; Rebs: Moerman 5 Asts: Larkin, Micić 5 PIR: Micić 21	Arena: WiZink Center; Attendance: 8,972; Referees: Ilija Belošević, Carmelo Paternicò, Joseph Bissang

25 January 2019	Khimki (Russia)	60–71	(Germany) Bayern Munich	Mytishchi
18:00	Scoring by quarter: 28–10, 12–25, 10–21, 10–15
	Pts: Mickey, Thomas 13; Rebs: Thomas 10; Asts: Marković, Thomas 5 PIR: Thomas 25	Boxscore	Pts: Williams 20; Rebs: Barthel 7 Asts: Hobbs 4 PIR: Williams 22	Arena: Mytishchi Arena; Attendance: 6,151; Referees: Daniel Hierrezuelo, Milivoje Jovčić, Igor Dragojević

25 January 2019	Darüşşafaka Tekfen (Turkey)	80–75	(Spain) Kirolbet Baskonia	Istanbul
18:15	Scoring by quarter: 21–29, 24–18, 18–14, 17–14
	Pts: Douglas 21; Rebs: Douglas 6 Asts: Douglas, Özmızrak 5 PIR: Douglas 30	Boxscore	Pts: Janning 18; Rebs: Voigtmann 11; Asts: Huertas 6 PIR: Voigtmann 22	Arena: Volkswagen Arena; Attendance: 2,585; Referees: Damir Javor, Spiros Gkontas, Saulius Racys

25 January 2019	Budućnost VOLI (Montenegro)	75–70	(Spain) Herbalife Gran Canaria	Podgorica
19:00	Scoring by quarter: 27–24, 9–14, 25–19, 14–13
	Pts: Cole 20; Rebs: Clarke 9 Asts: Cole 5 PIR: Bitadze 27	Boxscore	Pts: Vene 16; Rebs: three players 6 Asts: Magette 6 PIR: Pasečņiks 16	Arena: Morača; Attendance: 5,055; Referees: Borys Ryzhyk, Elias Koromilas, Robert Vyklický

25 January 2019	Barcelona Lassa (Spain)	76–84	(Russia) CSKA Moscow	Barcelona
21:00	Scoring by quarter: 20–20, 21–24, 20–19, 15–21
	Pts: Claver 17; Rebs: Oriola, Tomić 5 Asts: Pangos 9 PIR: Claver 16	Boxscore	Pts: De Colo 25; Rebs: Clyburn 10; Asts: Rodríguez 7 PIR: De Colo 27	Arena: Palau Blaugrana; Attendance: 6,007; Referees: Ilija Belošević, Fernando Rocha, Mehdi Difallah

=== Round 21 ===
31 January 2019	Khimki (Russia)	74–64	(Lithuania) Žalgiris	Mytishchi
18:00	Scoring by quarter: 19–17, 17–20, 11–19, 27–8
	Pts: Mickey 20; Rebs: Mickey 9 Asts: Marković 6 PIR: Mickey 25	Boxscore	Pts: Grigonis 15; Rebs: Davies 6 Asts: Davies 4 PIR: Ulanovas 14	Arena: Mytishchi Arena; Attendance: 5,789; Referees: Matej Boltauzer, Carmelo Paternicò, Oļegs Latiševs

31 January 2019	Olympiacos (Greece)	55–76	(Spain) Barcelona Lassa	Piraeus
20:00	Scoring by quarter: 6–27, 22–11, 15–17, 12–21
	Pts: Milutinov, Strēlnieks 13; Rebs: Milutinov 8 Asts: Milutinov, Spanoulis 3 PIR: Milutinov 29	Boxscore	Pts: Singleton 18; Rebs: Oriola 6 Asts: Pangos 8 PIR: Pangos 19	Arena: Peace and Friendship Stadium; Attendance: 10,207; Referees: Borys Ryzhyk, Milivoje Jovčić, Tomislav Hordov

31 January 2019	Bayern Munich (Germany)	90–86(OT)	(Turkey) Fenerbahçe Beko	Munich
20:30	Scoring by quarter: 20–21, 9–13, 23–18, 14–14, Overtime: 14-14, 10–6
	Pts: Jović, Williams 19; Rebs: Barthel 7 Asts: Đedović, Hobbs 5 PIR: Williams 26	Boxscore	Pts: Dixon 23; Rebs: Datome 8 Asts: Sloukas 7 PIR: Dixon 23	Arena: Audi Dome; Attendance: 5,346; Referees: Saša Pukl, Emilio Pérez Pizarro, Rain Peerandi

31 January 2019	Kirolbet Baskonia (Spain)	97–73	(Israel) Maccabi Tel Aviv	Vitoria-Gasteiz
20:45	Scoring by quarter: 26–18, 28–23, 27–16, 16–16
	Pts: Voigtmann 20; Rebs: Poirier 10; Asts: Huertas 8 PIR: Hilliard 23	Boxscore	Pts: Wilbekin 19; Rebs: Black 7 Asts: Caloiaro, Wilbekin 4 PIR: Wilbekin 18	Arena: Fernando Buesa Arena; Attendance: 10,327; Referees: Luigi Lamonica, Ilija Belošević, Miloš Koljenšić

1 February 2019	CSKA Moscow (Russia)	99–69	(Montenegro) Budućnost VOLI	Moscow
18:00	Scoring by quarter: 28–20, 24–27, 20–14, 27–8
	Pts: De Colo 26; Rebs: De Colo 7 Asts: De Colo, Hines 7 PIR: De Colo 38	Boxscore	Pts: Cole 11; Rebs: Barović, Jackson 3 Asts: Gordić 4 PIR: Barović 15	Arena: Megasport Arena; Attendance: 4,473; Referees: Miguel Ángel Pérez Niz, Seffi Shemmesh, Robert Vyklický

1 February 2019	Darüşşafaka Tekfen (Turkey)	82–86	(Spain) Real Madrid	Istanbul
18:15	Scoring by quarter: 16–23, 22–30, 21–19, 23–14
	Pts: Douglas 27; Rebs: Evans 12; Asts: Douglas 4 PIR: Evans 31	Boxscore	Pts: Randolph, Thompkins 15; Rebs: Tavares 7 Asts: Campazzo 5 PIR: Randolph 16	Arena: Volkswagen Arena; Attendance: 3,064; Referees: Sreten Radović, Elias Koromilas, Mykola Ambrosov

1 February 2019	Panathinaikos OPAP (Greece)	88–75	(Turkey) Anadolu Efes	Athens
20:30	Scoring by quarter: 24–16, 18–21, 19–19, 27–19
	Pts: Calathes 20; Rebs: Gist 10; Asts: Calathes 13; PIR: Calathes 35	Boxscore	Pts: Beaubois 15; Rebs: Dunston 6 Asts: Micić 8 PIR: Simon 14	Arena: Olympic Sports Center; Attendance: 11,961; Referees: Daniel Hierrezuelo, Fernando Rocha, Gytis Vilius

1 February 2019	Herbalife Gran Canaria (Spain)	104–106(OT)	(Italy) AX Armani Exchange Olimpia	Las Palmas
21:00	Scoring by quarter: 28–27, 18–12, 21–29, 22–21, Overtime: 15–17
	Pts: Eriksson 28; Rebs: Pasečņiks, Tillie 6 Asts: Oliver 5 PIR: Eriksson 25	Boxscore	Pts: Micov 24; Rebs: Brooks 8 Asts: James 6 PIR: James 25	Arena: Gran Canaria Arena; Attendance: 4,697; Referees: Damir Javor, Petri Mäntylä, Clemens Fritz

=== Round 22 ===
7 February 2019	Anadolu Efes (Turkey)	93–74	(Spain) Herbalife Gran Canaria	Istanbul
18:30	Scoring by quarter: 26–19, 17–27, 26–14, 24–14
	Pts: Simon 25; Rebs: Dunston 7 Asts: Larkin 6 PIR: Simon 34	Boxscore	Pts: Hannah 16; Rebs: Balvín, Paulí 4 Asts: Hannah 5 PIR: Eriksson 16	Arena: Sinan Erdem Dome; Attendance: 3,467 (tentative); Referees: Luigi Lamonica, Anne Panther, Jakub Zamojski

7 February 2019	Budućnost VOLI (Montenegro)	90–98	(Russia) Khimki	Podgorica
19:00	Scoring by quarter: 20–22, 26–23, 19–23, 25–30
	Pts: Cole 20; Rebs: Bitadze 7 Asts: Cole 11; PIR: Bitadze, Cole 25	Boxscore	Pts: Mickey 25; Rebs: Thomas 8 Asts: Marković 5 PIR: Mickey 28	Arena: Morača; Attendance: 4,756 (tentative); Referees: Juan Carlos García González, Emin Moğulkoç, Clemens Fritz

7 February 2019	Maccabi Tel Aviv (Israel)	65–64	(Greece) Olympiacos	Tel Aviv
20:05	Scoring by quarter: 14–16, 12–13, 19–13, 20–22
	Pts: Black 19; Rebs: O'Bryant 8 Asts: Roll, Wilbekin 2 PIR: Black 23	Boxscore	Pts: Spanoulis, Williams-Goss 16; Rebs: Printezis 8 Asts: Strēlnieks, Williams-Goss 2 PIR: Milutinov 15	Arena: Menora Mivtachim Arena; Attendance: 11,060 (tentative); Referees: Daniel Hierrezuelo, Carmelo Paternicò, Milan Nedović

7 February 2019	Barcelona Lassa (Spain)	78–72	(Lithuania) Žalgiris	Barcelona
21:00	Scoring by quarter: 23–20, 22–18, 15–24, 18–10
	Pts: Hanga 14; Rebs: Oriola, Singleton 7 Asts: Heurtel 4 PIR: Tomić 20	Boxscore	Pts: Milaknis 17; Rebs: White 8 Asts: Wolters 7 PIR: White 18	Arena: Palau Blaugrana; Attendance: 5,416 (tentative); Referees: Saša Pukl, Elias Koromilas, Miloš Koljenšić

8 February 2019	CSKA Moscow (Russia)	82–78	(Spain) Real Madrid	Moscow
18:00	Scoring by quarter: 22–20, 12–20, 30–21, 18–17
	Pts: De Colo 21; Rebs: Peters 8 Asts: De Colo 4 PIR: De Colo 22	Boxscore	Pts: Randolph 20; Rebs: Ayón 6 Asts: Ayón 6 PIR: Ayón 21	Arena: Megasport Arena; Attendance: 12,341 (tentative); Referees: Robert Lottermoser, Damir Javor, Gytis Vilius

8 February 2019	Fenerbahçe Beko (Turkey)	85–66	(Greece) Panathinaikos OPAP	Istanbul
18:45	Scoring by quarter: 24–18, 24–11, 15–17, 22–20
	Pts: Melli 14; Rebs: Melli 7 Asts: Dixon, Melli 4 PIR: Melli 27	Boxscore	Pts: Kilpatrick 19; Rebs: Thomas 6 Asts: Calathes 5 PIR: Kilpatrick 18	Arena: Ülker Sports and Event Hall; Attendance: 11.825 (tentative); Referees: Miguel Ángel Pérez Niz, Sreten Radović, Mehdi Difallah

8 February 2019	Kirolbet Baskonia (Spain)	76–68	(Germany) Bayern Munich	Vitoria-Gasteiz
20:30	Scoring by quarter: 19–16, 19–21, 21–16, 17–15
	Pts: Janning 13; Rebs: Poirier 11; Asts: Huertas 5 PIR: Poirier 21	Boxscore	Pts: Williams 18; Rebs: Lučić 7 Asts: Đedović, Hobbs 3 PIR: Williams 18	Arena: Fernando Buesa Arena; Attendance: 11,854 (tentative); Referees: Borys Ryzhyk, Oļegs Latiševs, Ioannis Foufis

8 February 2019	AX Armani Exchange Olimpia (Italy)	90–78	(Turkey) Darüşşafaka Tekfen	Assago
20:45	Scoring by quarter: 19–17, 21–19, 20–25, 30–17
	Pts: Kuzminskas 19; Rebs: Kuzminskas, Omić 8 Asts: James 5 PIR: Kuzminskas 28	Boxscore	Pts: Douglas 21; Rebs: Kidd 8 Asts: Özmızrak, Savas 2 PIR: Douglas 21	Arena: Mediolanum Forum; Attendance: 8,637 (tentative); Referees: Matej Boltauzer, Rain Peerandi, Jordi Aliaga

=== Round 23 ===
21 February 2019	CSKA Moscow (Russia)	107–85	(Spain) Herbalife Gran Canaria	Moscow
18:00	Scoring by quarter: 29–20, 27–22, 27–22, 24–21
	Pts: Rodríguez 18; Rebs: Clyburn 7 Asts: Rodríguez 8 PIR: Clyburn 24	Boxscore	Pts: Eriksson, Tillie 13; Rebs: Balvín 7 Asts: Magette 5 PIR: Tillie 18	Arena: Megasport Arena; Attendance: 5,511; Referees: Milivoje Jovčić, Joseph Bissang, Renaud Geller

21 February 2019	Anadolu Efes (Turkey)	75–65	(Greece) Olympiacos	Istanbul
18:30	Scoring by quarter: 18–22, 18–13, 20–14, 19–16
	Pts: Simon 13; Rebs: Moerman 8 Asts: Larkin 8 PIR: Larkin 19	Boxscore	Pts: Strēlnieks 14; Rebs: Milutinov 8 Asts: Weber, Williams-Goss 3 PIR: Strēlnieks 18	Arena: Sinan Erdem Dome; Attendance: 10,010; Referees: Damir Javor, Miguel Ángel Pérez Niz, Jurgis Laurinavicius

21 February 2019	AX Armani Exchange Olimpia (Italy)	87–83	(Israel) Maccabi Tel Aviv	Assago
20:45	Scoring by quarter: 20–22, 27–25, 17–15, 23–21
	Pts: James 19; Rebs: Omić 8 Asts: James 5 PIR: James 26	Boxscore	Pts: Wilbekin 20; Rebs: O'Bryant 8 Asts: Pargo, Wilbekin 3 PIR: O'Bryant 16	Arena: Mediolanum Forum; Attendance: 9,610; Referees: Borys Ryzhyk, Juan Carlos García González, Anne Panther

21 February 2019	Barcelona Lassa (Spain)	77–67	(Spain) Kirolbet Baskonia	Barcelona
21:00	Scoring by quarter: 22–9, 24–17, 16–19, 15–22
	Pts: Ribas, Séraphin 15; Rebs: Séraphin, Singleton 6 Asts: Heurtel 9 PIR: Heurtel 21	Boxscore	Pts: Shields 18; Rebs: Poirier 8 Asts: Huertas 6 PIR: Shields 15	Arena: Palau Blaugrana; Attendance: 5,638; Referees: Christos Christodoulou, Carmelo Paternicò, Sašo Petek

22 February 2019	Darüşşafaka Tekfen (Turkey)	75–97	(Turkey) Fenerbahçe Beko	Istanbul
18:15	Scoring by quarter: 12–26, 23–20, 13–27, 27–24
	Pts: Eric 14; Rebs: Eric, Demir 6 Asts: Douglas, Peiners 4 PIR: Peiners 15	Boxscore	Pts: Dixon, Gudurić 16; Rebs: Veselý 6 Asts: Dixon, Sloukas 4 PIR: Gudurić 21	Arena: Volkswagen Arena; Attendance: 4,204; Referees: Oļegs Latiševs, Benjamín Jiménez, Ioannis Foufis

22 February 2019	Žalgiris (Lithuania)	84–76	(Montenegro) Budućnost VOLI	Kaunas
19:00	Scoring by quarter: 20–18, 19–18, 21–26, 24–14
	Pts: Davies 21; Rebs: Davies 8 Asts: Walkup 6 PIR: Davies 34	Boxscore	Pts: Cole 26; Rebs: Clark, Williams 8 Asts: three players 2 PIR: Cole 21	Arena: Žalgirio Arena; Attendance: 14,571; Referees: Daniel Hierrezuelo, Piotr Pastusiak, Michele Rossi

22 February 2019	Panathinaikos OPAP (Greece)	94–85	(Russia) Khimki	Athens
20:00	Scoring by quarter: 33–21, 32–29, 13–17, 16–18
	Pts: Thomas 25; Rebs: Thomas 6 Asts: Calathes 11; PIR: Thomas 24	Boxscore	Pts: Thomas 18; Rebs: Thomas 11; Asts: Marković 9 PIR: Thomas 26	Arena: Olympic Sports Center; Attendance: 10,036; Referees: Ilija Belošević, Carlos Peruga, Milan Nedović

22 February 2019	Real Madrid (Spain)	91–78	(Germany) Bayern Munich	Madrid
21:00	Scoring by quarter: 22–17, 20–22, 29–13, 20–26
	Pts: Llull 15; Rebs: Tavares 9 Asts: Llull 7 PIR: Deck 18	Boxscore	Pts: Barthel 14; Rebs: Lučić 6 Asts: Hobbs 7 PIR: Lučić 18	Arena: WiZink Center; Attendance: 10,256; Referees: Luigi Lamonica, Fernando Rocha, Amit Balak

=== Round 24 ===
28 February 2019	Khimki (Russia)	88–90	(Italy) AX Armani Exchange Olimpia	Mytishchi
18:00	Scoring by quarter: 25–20, 29–25, 19–20, 15–25
	Pts: Shved 23; Rebs: Thomas 8 Asts: Shved 11; PIR: Shved 29	Boxscore	Pts: James 16; Rebs: Tarczewski 6 Asts: Nunnally 7 PIR: Tarczewski 25	Arena: Mytishchi Arena; Attendance: 5,234; Referees: Daniel Hierrezuelo, Tomislav Hordov, Sašo Petek

28 February 2019	Fenerbahçe Beko (Turkey)	84–66	(Turkey) Anadolu Efes	Istanbul
18:45	Scoring by quarter: 20–17, 23–12, 14–18, 27–19
	Pts: Sloukas 17; Rebs: Veselý 8 Asts: Gudurić, Sloukas 4 PIR: Sloukas 20	Boxscore	Pts: Moerman 18; Rebs: Moerman 5 Asts: Micić 5 PIR: Larkin 17	Arena: Ülker Sports and Event Hall; Attendance: 11,690; Referees: Robert Lottermoser, Carlos Peruga, Piotr Pastusiak

28 February 2019	Maccabi Tel Aviv (Israel)	77–58	(Turkey) Darüşşafaka Tekfen	Tel Aviv
20:05	Scoring by quarter: 18–10, 20–13, 19–18, 20–17
	Pts: Black 17; Rebs: Tyus 9 Asts: four players 2 PIR: Black, Tyus 23	Boxscore	Pts: Evans 17; Rebs: Savas 6 Asts: Brown 6 PIR: Evans 20	Arena: Menora Mivtachim Arena; Attendance: 10,352; Referees: Miguel Ángel Pérez Niz, Damir Javor, Hugues Thépénier

28 February 2019	Kirolbet Baskonia (Spain)	80–73	(Lithuania) Žalgiris	Vitoria-Gasteiz
20:30	Scoring by quarter: 17–12, 23–13, 19–27, 21–21
	Pts: Vildoza 16; Rebs: Shields 10; Asts: Huertas 7 PIR: Shields 27	Boxscore	Pts: Davies 13; Rebs: Davies, Walkup 5 Asts: Westermann 5 PIR: Grigonis 18	Arena: Fernando Buesa Arena; Attendance: 10,410; Referees: Sreten Radović, Milivoje Jovčić, Fernando Rocha

28 February 2019	Herbalife Gran Canaria (Spain)	80–99	(Greece) Panathinaikos OPAP	Las Palmas
21:00	Scoring by quarter: 26–28, 19–22, 21–23, 14–26
	Pts: Rabaseda 21; Rebs: Tillie 9 Asts: Radičević 7 PIR: Rabaseda 20	Boxscore	Pts: Langford 18; Rebs: four players 5 Asts: Calathes 9 PIR: Antetokounmpo, Calathes 20	Arena: Gran Canaria Arena; Attendance: 3,945; Referees: Borys Ryzhyk, Oļegs Latiševs, Eduard Udyanskyy

1 March 2019	Budućnost VOLI (Montenegro)	75–89	(Germany) Bayern Munich	Podgorica
19:00	Scoring by quarter: 17–25, 27–16, 15–25, 16–23
	Pts: Jackson 19; Rebs: Nikolić 6 Asts: Gordić 5 PIR: Jackson 19	Boxscore	Pts: Lučić 18; Rebs: Lučić, Williams 7 Asts: Jović 7 PIR: Lučić 23	Arena: Morača; Attendance: 5,047; Referees: Christos Christodoulou, Mehdi Difallah, Marcin Kowalski

1 March 2019	Olympiacos (Greece)	81–97	(Russia) CSKA Moscow	Piraeus
20:30	Scoring by quarter: 23–21, 27–30, 14–21, 17–25
	Pts: LeDay 21; Rebs: LeDay 9 Asts: Spanoulis 7 PIR: LeDay 28	Boxscore	Pts: Higgins 18; Rebs: Clyburn, Hunter 8 Asts: Rodríguez 12; PIR: Rodríguez 23	Arena: Peace and Friendship Stadium; Attendance: 9,530; Referees: Luigi Lamonica, Juan Carlos García González, Mario Majkić

1 March 2019	Barcelona Lassa (Spain)	77–70	(Spain) Real Madrid	Barcelona
21:00	Scoring by quarter: 16–17, 26–20, 14–14, 21–19
	Pts: Tomić 22; Rebs: Tomić 13; Asts: Heurtel 10; PIR: Tomić 28	Boxscore	Pts: Fernández 15; Rebs: Randolph 9 Asts: Llull 4 PIR: Randolph 16	Arena: Palau Blaugrana; Attendance: 7,311; Referees: Matej Boltauzer, Ilija Belošević, Emin Moğulkoç

=== Round 25 ===
7 March 2019	Darüşşafaka Tekfen (Turkey)	67–91	(Greece) Panathinaikos OPAP	Istanbul
18:15	Scoring by quarter: 17–20, 20–26, 16–20, 14–25
	Pts: Douglas 14; Rebs: Evans 11; Asts: three players 3 PIR: Evans 17	Boxscore	Pts: Papapetrou 18; Rebs: Papagiannis 12; Asts: Calathes 11; PIR: Papagiannis 26	Arena: Volkswagen Arena; Attendance: 2,983; Referees: Robert Lottermoser, Joseph Bissang, Carlos Cortés

7 March 2019	Žalgiris (Lithuania)	98–64	(Spain) Herbalife Gran Canaria	Kaunas
19:00	Scoring by quarter: 25–10, 21–17, 31–18, 21–19
	Pts: Ulanovas 18; Rebs: Thompson 7 Asts: Jokubaitis 5 PIR: Ulanovas 23	Boxscore	Pts: Eriksson 13; Rebs: Jefferson 6 Asts: Radičević 6 PIR: Wiley 11	Arena: Žalgirio Arena; Attendance: 13,569; Referees: Ilija Belošević, Matej Boltauzer, Amit Balak

7 March 2019	Bayern Munich (Germany)	70–77	(Israel) Maccabi Tel Aviv	Munich
20:30	Scoring by quarter: 17–18, 14–15, 16–25, 23–19
	Pts: Williams 17; Rebs: Williams 7 Asts: Jović 5 PIR: Barthel 22	Boxscore	Pts: Wilbekin 19; Rebs: Black, O'Bryant 7 Asts: Wilbekin 6 PIR: Black 21	Arena: Audi Dome; Attendance: 4,930; Referees: Benjamín Jiménez, Piotr Pastusiak, Sašo Petek

7 March 2019	Real Madrid (Spain)	101–86	(Turkey) Fenerbahçe Beko	Madrid
21:00	Scoring by quarter: 27–25, 25–20, 25–16, 24–25
	Pts: Randolph 21; Rebs: Tavares 5 Asts: Llull 10; PIR: Llull, Randolph 25	Boxscore	Pts: Sloukas 15; Rebs: Melli 6 Asts: Sloukas 7 PIR: Sloukas 18	Arena: WiZink Center; Attendance: 11,471; Referees: Christos Christodoulou, Carmelo Paternicò, Tomislav Hordov

8 March 2019	CSKA Moscow (Russia)	101–95	(Italy) AX Armani Exchange Olimpia	Moscow
18:00	Scoring by quarter: 27–24, 24–19, 25–23, 25–29
	Pts: Hunter 19; Rebs: Kurbanov 8 Asts: Rodríguez 7 PIR: Clyburn, Hunter 23	Boxscore	Pts: Micov, Nedović 16; Rebs: Tarczewski 5 Asts: James 7 PIR: Micov, Nunnally 18	Arena: Megasport Arena; Attendance: 6,142; Referees: Sreten Radović, Miguel Ángel Pérez Niz, Tomasz Trawicki

8 March 2019	Anadolu Efes (Turkey)	92–70	(Spain) Barcelona Lassa	Istanbul
18:30	Scoring by quarter: 24–12, 18–19, 22–22, 28–17
	Pts: Larkin 37; Rebs: Moerman 11; Asts: Micić, Simon 4 PIR: Larkin 43	Boxscore	Pts: Hanga 14; Rebs: Tomić 7 Asts: three players 4 PIR: Tomić 21	Arena: Sinan Erdem Dome; Attendance: 14,161; Referees: Milivoje Jovčić, Fernando Rocha, Jurgis Laurinavicius

8 March 2019	Budućnost VOLI (Montenegro)	76–89	(Greece) Olympiacos	Podgorica
19:00	Scoring by quarter: 21–27, 13–24, 20–22, 22–16
	Pts: Barović, Jackson 13; Rebs: Barović 6 Asts: Jackson 7 PIR: Jackson 19	Boxscore	Pts: Printezis 19; Rebs: Milutinov 12; Asts: Spanoulis 8 PIR: Milutinov 29	Arena: Morača; Attendance: 4,854; Referees: Borys Ryzhyk, Carlos Peruga, Artūras Šukys

8 March 2019	Kirolbet Baskonia (Spain)	104–86	(Russia) Khimki	Vitoria-Gasteiz
20:30	Scoring by quarter: 22–17, 18–24, 38–16, 26–29
	Pts: Poirier 18; Rebs: Poirier 11; Asts: Voigtmann, Huertas 9 PIR: Voigtmann 31	Boxscore	Pts: Thomas 19; Rebs: Thomas 4 Asts: Shved 8 PIR: Thomas 21	Arena: Fernando Buesa Arena; Attendance: 10,739; Referees: Luigi Lamonica, Damir Javor, Anne Panther

=== Round 26 ===
14 March 2019	Khimki (Russia)	75–100	(Spain) Real Madrid	Mytishchi
18:00	Scoring by quarter: 22–24, 16–27, 12–19, 25–30
	Pts: Shved 21; Rebs: Thomas 7 Asts: Marković 5 PIR: Shved 18	Boxscore	Pts: Causeur 22; Rebs: Tavares 11; Asts: Campazzo 9 PIR: Causeur 24	Arena: Mytishchi Arena; Attendance: 6,456; Referees: Borys Ryzhyk, Milivoje Jovčić, Jurgis Laurinavicius

14 March 2019	Žalgiris (Lithuania)	85–79	(Germany) Bayern Munich	Kaunas
19:00	Scoring by quarter: 22–20, 26–15, 21–18, 16–26
	Pts: Grigonis 18; Rebs: Westermann, White 5 Asts: Westermann 4 PIR: Grigonis 22	Boxscore	Pts: Đedović 17; Rebs: Đedović 5 Asts: Barthel 5 PIR: Đedović 20	Arena: Žalgirio Arena; Attendance: 14,788; Referees: Miguel Ángel Pérez Niz, Carmelo Paternicò, Milan Nedović

14 March 2019	Maccabi Tel Aviv (Israel)	71–79	(Turkey) Anadolu Efes	Tel Aviv
20:05	Scoring by quarter: 18–13, 23–26, 17–19, 13–21
	Pts: Black 18; Rebs: Caloiaro 8 Asts: Wilbekin 6 PIR: Black, O'Bryant 14	Boxscore	Pts: Micić 15; Rebs: Simon 9 Asts: Micić 5 PIR: Larkin 17	Arena: Menora Mivtachim Arena; Attendance: 10,708; Referees: Daniel Hierrezuelo, Saša Pukl, Michele Rossi

14 March 2019	AX Armani Exchange Olimpia (Italy)	66–57	(Greece) Olympiacos	Assago
20:45	Scoring by quarter: 19–10, 4–13, 26–16, 17–18
	Pts: James 27; Rebs: Brooks, Tarczewski 10; Asts: James 6 PIR: James 31	Boxscore	Pts: Milutinov 13; Rebs: Milutinov 9 Asts: Williams-Goss 6 PIR: Milutinov 25	Arena: Mediolanum Forum; Attendance: 10,096; Referees: Robert Lottermoser, Emilio Pérez Pizarro, Sérgio Silva

14 March 2019	Herbalife Gran Canaria (Spain)	84–64	(Turkey) Darüşşafaka Tekfen	Las Palmas
21:30	Scoring by quarter: 15–18, 22–12, 23–17, –
	Pts: Eriksson 16; Rebs: Balvín 6 Asts: Hannah, Paulí 4 PIR: Balvín 14	Boxscore	Pts: Özmızrak 11; Rebs: Kidd 7 Asts: Özmızrak 3 PIR: Douglas, Savas 14	Arena: Gran Canaria Arena; Attendance: 3,648; Referees: Fernando Rocha, Spiros Gkontas, Milija Vojinović

15 March 2019	CSKA Moscow (Russia)	77–78	(Greece) Panathinaikos OPAP	Moscow
18:00	Scoring by quarter: 20–18, 21–17, 18–23, 18–20
	Pts: Rodríguez 23; Rebs: Clyburn 12; Asts: Hunter 3 PIR: Rodríguez 17	Boxscore	Pts: Thomas 12; Rebs: Papapetrou 9 Asts: Calathes 9 PIR: Papapetrou 22	Arena: Megasport Arena; Attendance: 6,410; Referees: Matej Boltauzer, Emin Moğulkoç, Jakub Zamojski

15 March 2019	Fenerbahçe Beko (Turkey)	88–82	(Spain) Barcelona Lassa	Istanbul
18:45	Scoring by quarter: 16–23, 21–15, 15–23, 36–21
	Pts: Sloukas 22; Rebs: Melli 5 Asts: Sloukas 11; PIR: Sloukas 30	Boxscore	Pts: Blažič 15; Rebs: Tomić 5 Asts: Heurtel 6 PIR: Tomić 21	Arena: Ülker Sports and Event Hall; Attendance: 12,628; Referees: Luigi Lamonica, Sreten Radović, Gytis Vilius

15 March 2019	Kirolbet Baskonia (Spain)	82–62	(Montenegro) Budućnost VOLI	Vitoria-Gasteiz
20:30	Scoring by quarter: 23–15, 16–19, 25–15, 18–13
	Pts: Garino 16; Rebs: Poirier 13; Asts: three players 4 PIR: Poirier 21	Boxscore	Pts: Cole 17; Rebs: Clark 9 Asts: Cole 4 PIR: Cole 16	Arena: Fernando Buesa Arena; Attendance: 9,743; Referees: Oļegs Latiševs, Elias Koromilas, Robert Vyklický

=== Round 27 ===
19 March 2019	Anadolu Efes (Turkey)	78–80	(Russia) CSKA Moscow	Istanbul
18:00	Scoring by quarter: 20–15, 15–25, 23–21, 20–19
	Pts: Dunston 19; Rebs: Dunston 9 Asts: Micić 4 PIR: Dunston 25	Boxscore	Pts: Higgins 19; Rebs: Clyburn 8 Asts: De Colo, Higgins 5 PIR: Higgins 22	Arena: Sinan Erdem Dome; Attendance: 14,258; Referees: Damir Javor, Emilio Pérez Pizarro, Joseph Bissang

19 March 2019	Fenerbahçe Beko (Turkey)	76–67	(Montenegro) Budućnost VOLI	Istanbul
18:45	Scoring by quarter: 19–16, 17–23, 22–19, 18–9
	Pts: Kalinić 14; Rebs: Veselý 9 Asts: Dixon, Veselý 4 PIR: Veselý 26	Boxscore	Pts: Clark 20; Rebs: Bitadze 7 Asts: Gordić 10; PIR: Clark 19	Arena: Ülker Sports and Event Hall; Attendance: 7,738; Referees: Miguel Ángel Pérez Niz, Fernando Rocha, Eduard Udyanskyy

19 March 2019	Olympiacos (Greece)	89–69	(Germany) Bayern Munich	Piraeus
20:00	Scoring by quarter: 20–10, 30–21, 22–17, 17–21
	Pts: LeDay 23; Rebs: Papanikolaou 10; Asts: Papanikolaou 6 PIR: LeDay 24	Boxscore	Pts: Koponen 15; Rebs: Barthel, Jović 4 Asts: Jović 9 PIR: Booker 13	Arena: Peace and Friendship Stadium; Attendance: 6,808; Referees: Daniel Hierrezuelo, Tomislav Hordov, Robert Vyklický

19 March 2019	Barcelona Lassa (Spain)	93–64	(Spain) Herbalife Gran Canaria	Barcelona
21:00	Scoring by quarter: 22–19, 16–16, 25–11, 30–18
	Pts: Pangos 19; Rebs: four players 5 Asts: Heurtel 9 PIR: Pangos 22	Boxscore	Pts: Strawberry 15; Rebs: Balvín 10; Asts: Balvín 4 PIR: Strawberry 14	Arena: Palau Blaugrana; Attendance: 5,312; Referees: Christos Christodoulou, Piotr Pastusiak, Josip Radojkovic

20 March 2019	Darüşşafaka Tekfen (Turkey)	91–85	(Russia) Khimki	Istanbul
18:15	Scoring by quarter: 17–23, 31–23, 15–19, 28–20
	Pts: Eric 22; Rebs: Eric 15; Asts: Akay, Douglas 6 PIR: Eric 33	Boxscore	Pts: Shved 31; Rebs: Thomas 5 Asts: Marković 8 PIR: Shved 28	Arena: Volkswagen Arena; Attendance: 2,094; Referees: Juan Carlos García González, Sérgio Silva, Ingus Baumanis

20 March 2019	Panathinaikos OPAP (Greece)	72–70	(Spain) Kirolbet Baskonia	Athens
20:00	Scoring by quarter: 26–10, 22–17, 8–21, 16–22
	Pts: Thomas 16; Rebs: Papagiannis 7 Asts: Calathes 12; PIR: Papagiannis 20	Boxscore	Pts: Huertas, Shields 13; Rebs: Voigtmann 11; Asts: Voigtmann 7 PIR: Voigtmann 18	Arena: Olympic Sports Center; Attendance: 16,513; Referees: Ilija Belošević, Carmelo Paternicò, Mehdi Difallah

20 March 2019	Maccabi Tel Aviv (Israel)	83–85	(Lithuania) Žalgiris	Tel Aviv
20:05	Scoring by quarter: 23–19, 22–17, 14–21, 24–28
	Pts: Black, Wilbekin 18; Rebs: Caloiaro 8 Asts: Roll 6 PIR: Black 22	Boxscore	Pts: Westermann 16; Rebs: Davies 6 Asts: Westermann 5 PIR: Westermann 22	Arena: Menora Mivtachim Arena; Attendance: 10,377; Referees: Luigi Lamonica, Emin Moğulkoç, Jordi Aliaga

20 March 2019	Real Madrid (Spain)	92–89	(Italy) AX Armani Exchange Olimpia	Madrid
21:00	Scoring by quarter: 19–33, 31–23, 24–19, 18–14
	Pts: Llull 14; Rebs: Ayón 10; Asts: Campazzo, Llull 4 PIR: Tavares 21	Boxscore	Pts: James 35; Rebs: James 8 Asts: James 3 PIR: James 37	Arena: WiZink Center; Attendance: 8,978; Referees: Saša Pukl, Elias Koromilas, Petri Mäntylä

=== Round 28 ===
21 March 2019	CSKA Moscow (Russia)	70–68	(Turkey) Fenerbahçe Beko	Moscow
18:00	Scoring by quarter: 14–18, 22–17, 16–13, 18–20
	Pts: Clyburn 16; Rebs: Clyburn, Kurbanov 8 Asts: Rodríguez 4 PIR: Clyburn 21	Boxscore	Pts: Kalinić 17; Rebs: Kalinić 7 Asts: Kalinić 4 PIR: Kalinić 23	Arena: Megasport Arena; Attendance: 10,762; Referees: Robert Lottermoser, Oļegs Latiševs, Benjamín Jiménez

21 March 2019	Budućnost VOLI (Montenegro)	84–91	(Turkey) Anadolu Efes	Podgorica
20:00	Scoring by quarter: 19–27, 21–26, 18–18, 26–20
	Pts: Jackson 17; Rebs: Bitadze, Clark 5 Asts: three players 4 PIR: Bitadze 22	Boxscore	Pts: Micić 18; Rebs: Simon 6 Asts: Micić 6 PIR: Micić 23	Arena: Morača; Attendance: 4,755; Referees: Christos Christodoulou, Amit Balak, Mykola Ambrosov

21 March 2019	Bayern Munich (Germany)	73–71	(Spain) Barcelona Lassa	Munich
20:00	Scoring by quarter: 18–19, 14–17, 17–20, 24–15
	Pts: Booker, Koponen 14; Rebs: Đedović 6 Asts: Lučić 6 PIR: Booker, Koponen 18	Boxscore	Pts: Heurtel, Tomić 13; Rebs: Singleton, Tomić 6 Asts: Tomić 5 PIR: Tomić 25	Arena: Audi Dome; Attendance: 5,151; Referees: Borys Ryzhyk, Damir Javor, Milija Vojinović

21 March 2019	Herbalife Gran Canaria (Spain)	90–67	(Greece) Olympiacos	Las Palmas
21:30	Scoring by quarter: 19–16, 21–14, 29–16, 21–21
	Pts: Eriksson 24; Rebs: Balvín, Tillie 5 Asts: Hannah 5 PIR: Eriksson 24	Boxscore	Pts: Weber 13; Rebs: Milutinov 6 Asts: Weber 3 PIR: Printezis 16	Arena: Gran Canaria Arena; Attendance: 4,914; Referees: Sreten Radović, Anne Panther, Renaud Geller

22 March 2019	Khimki (Russia)	71–76	(Israel) Maccabi Tel Aviv	Mytishchi
18:00	Scoring by quarter: 24–15, 15–25, 16–19, 16–17
	Pts: Shved 17; Rebs: Thomas 8 Asts: Marković 5 PIR: Thomas 18	Boxscore	Pts: Roll 17; Rebs: O'Bryant 11; Asts: Pargo 5 PIR: O'Bryant 16	Arena: Mytishchi Arena; Attendance: 4,901; Referees: Miguel Ángel Pérez Niz, Fernando Rocha, Milan Nedović

22 March 2019	Žalgiris (Lithuania)	94–67	(Turkey) Darüşşafaka Tekfen	Kaunas
19:00	Scoring by quarter: 22–18, 27–12, 19–16, 26–21
	Pts: Davies 13; Rebs: three players 5 Asts: Wolters 5 PIR: Davies, Wolters 9 19	Boxscore	Pts: Evans 14; Rebs: Evans 5 Asts: four players 3 PIR: Evans 25	Arena: Žalgirio Arena; Attendance: 15,178; Referees: Daniel Hierrezuelo, Mario Majkić, Hugues Thépénier

22 March 2019	Kirolbet Baskonia (Spain)	86–76	(Spain) Real Madrid	Vitoria-Gasteiz
20:30	Scoring by quarter: 22–18, 17–18, 25–17, 22–23
	Pts: Vildoza 20; Rebs: Poirier 16; Asts: Huertas 4 PIR: Poirier 30	Boxscore	Pts: Thompkins 17; Rebs: Ayón 9 Asts: Llull 5 PIR: Thompkins 16	Arena: Fernando Buesa Arena; Attendance: 12,657; Referees: Matej Boltauzer, Emin Moğulkoç, Gytis Vilius

22 March 2019	AX Armani Exchange Olimpia (Italy)	83–95	(Greece) Panathinaikos OPAP	Desio
20:45	Scoring by quarter: 20–23, 27–21, 17–28, 19–23
	Pts: Kuzminskas 17; Rebs: Brooks, Kuzminskas 6 Asts: James 4 PIR: Kuzminskas 24	Boxscore	Pts: Calathes 27; Rebs: Calathes 8 Asts: Calathes 14; PIR: Calathes 39	Arena: PalaDesio; Attendance: 6,611; Referees: Juan Carlos García González, Milivoje Jovčić, Ersan Kartal

=== Round 29 ===
28 March 2019	Panathinaikos OPAP (Greece)	73–74	(Spain) Real Madrid	Athens
20:00	Scoring by quarter: 32–14, 13–19, 14–20, 14–21
	Pts: Calathes, Langford 14; Rebs: Calathes 9 Asts: Calathes 5 PIR: Langford 18	Boxscore	Pts: Tavares 14; Rebs: Tavares 16; Asts: Campazzo, Llull 5 PIR: Tavares 29	Arena: Olympic Sports Center; Attendance: 18,003; Referees: Luigi Lamonica, Anne Panther, Damir Javor

28 March 2019	Maccabi Tel Aviv (Israel)	90–55	(Spain) Herbalife Gran Canaria	Tel Aviv
20:05	Scoring by quarter: 21–9, 27–21, 16–15, 26–10
	Pts: Tyus 20; Rebs: Black, O'Bryant 8 Asts: Pargo 5 PIR: Tyus 26	Boxscore	Pts: Strawberry 11; Rebs: Balvín 7 Asts: Paulí 3 PIR: Hannah 8	Arena: Menora Mivtachim Arena; Attendance: 10,296; Referees: Oļegs Latiševs, Sašo Petek, Arturas Šukys

28 March 2019	AX Armani Exchange Olimpia (Italy)	90–104	(Turkey) Fenerbahçe Beko	Assago
20:45	Scoring by quarter: 17–22, 25–30, 26–21, 22–31
	Pts: Nunnally 26; Rebs: Brooks, Nunnally 5 Asts: James 4 PIR: Nunnally 33	Boxscore	Pts: Dixon 23; Rebs: Datome 6 Asts: Dixon 5 PIR: Kalinić 26	Arena: Mediolanum Forum; Attendance: 11,851; Referees: Boris Ryzhyk, Matej Boltauzer, Carlos Cortés

28 March 2019	Barcelona Lassa (Spain)	95–83	(Montenegro) Budućnost VOLI	Barcelona
21:00	Scoring by quarter: 21–22, 23–24, 28–23, 23–14
	Pts: Hanga 18; Rebs: Tomić 9 Asts: Heurtel 6 PIR: Hanga 26	Boxscore	Pts: Nikolić 25; Rebs: three players 4 Asts: Barović 4 PIR: Nikolić 22	Arena: Palau Blaugrana; Attendance: 4,784; Referees: Carmelo Paternico, Petri Mäntylä, Saulius Racys

29 March 2019	Khimki (Russia)	72–80	(Russia) CSKA Moscow	Mytishchi
18:00	Scoring by quarter: 15–23, 22–26, 14–15, 21–16
	Pts: Shved 17; Rebs: Mickey, Thomas 5 Asts: Shved 7 PIR: Mickey 17	Boxscore	Pts: De Colo 14; Rebs: Hines 7 Asts: Rodríguez 5 PIR: Hackett, Higgins 18	Arena: Mytishchi Arena; Attendance: 6,978; Referees: Sreten Radović, Mario Majkić, Milija Vojinović

29 March 2019	Darüşşafaka Tekfen (Turkey)	92–87	(Germany) Bayern Munich	Istanbul
18:15	Scoring by quarter: 14–27, 30–23, 21–17, 27–20
	Pts: Douglas 26; Rebs: Evans 7 Asts: Özmızrak 7 PIR: Douglas 37	Boxscore	Pts: Koponen 23; Rebs: Koponen, Lučić 5 Asts: Jović 7 PIR: Koponen 26	Arena: Volkswagen Arena; Attendance: 3,892; Referees: Christos Christodoulou, Emilio Pérez Pizarro, Uroš Nikolić

29 March 2019	Kirolbet Baskonia (Spain)	92–102	(Turkey) Anadolu Efes	Vitoria-Gasteiz
20:30	Scoring by quarter: 26–30, 27–18, 14–26, 25–28
	Pts: Vildoza 23; Rebs: Poirier 11; Asts: Huertas 7 PIR: Vildoza 34	Boxscore	Pts: Moerman, Pleiß 21; Rebs: Pleiß 12; Asts: Micić 11; PIR: Pleiß 28	Arena: Fernando Buesa Arena; Attendance: 11,099; Referees: Robert Lottermoser, Fernando Rocha, Jakub Zamojski

29 March 2019	Olympiacos (Greece)	68–72	(Lithuania) Žalgiris	Piraeus
20:30	Scoring by quarter: 18–16, 20–18, 13–14, 17–24
	Pts: Weber 26; Rebs: Milutinov 12; Asts: Williams-Goss 5 PIR: Milutinov 33	Boxscore	Pts: White 14; Rebs: Davies 7 Asts: three players 3 PIR: Davies, White 17	Arena: Peace and Friendship Stadium; Attendance: 9,527; Referees: Juan Carlos García González, Milivoje Jovčić, Josip Radojkovic

=== Round 30 ===
4 April 2019	CSKA Moscow (Russia)	82–78	(Spain) Kirolbet Baskonia	Moscow
19:00	Scoring by quarter: 17–21, 23–23, 15–22, 27–12
	Pts: Clyburn 16; Rebs: Clyburn 6 Asts: Hackett, Hines 3 PIR: Clyburn 20	Boxscore	Pts: Huertas 17; Rebs: Poirier 7 Asts: Huertas 4 PIR: Huertas 15	Arena: Megasport Arena; Attendance: 5,437; Referees: Borys Ryzhyk, Milivoje Jovčić, Jurgis Laurinavicius

4 April 2019	Anadolu Efes (Turkey)	101–95	(Italy) AX Armani Exchange Olimpia	Istanbul
19:30	Scoring by quarter: 24–20, 18–33, 32–16, 27–26
	Pts: Micić 18; Rebs: Moerman 8 Asts: Micić 8 PIR: Micić 28	Boxscore	Pts: James 17; Rebs: Kuzminskas, Omić 6 Asts: Micov 5 PIR: Micov 21	Arena: Sinan Erdem Dome; Attendance: 5,888; Referees: Miguel Ángel Pérez Niz, Ilija Belošević, Anne Panther

4 April 2019	Panathinaikos OPAP (Greece)	87–67	(Montenegro) Budućnost VOLI	Athens
20:00	Scoring by quarter: 23–21, 26–15, 17–20, 21–11
	Pts: Gist 23; Rebs: Calathes 12; Asts: Calathes 18; PIR: Gist 31	Boxscore	Pts: Bitadze 16; Rebs: Bitadze 8 Asts: Cole 7 PIR: Bitadze 21	Arena: Olympic Sports Center; Attendance: 13,312; Referees: Daniel Hierrezuelo, Oļegs Latiševs, Sinan Işgüder

4 April 2019	Real Madrid (Spain)	86–93	(Lithuania) Žalgiris	Madrid
21:00	Scoring by quarter: 27–25, 10–21, 23–20, 26–27
	Pts: Tavares 22; Rebs: Tavares 7 Asts: Prepelič 7 PIR: Tavares 32	Boxscore	Pts: Davies 27; Rebs: Davies 10; Asts: Walkup 7 PIR: Davies 34	Arena: WiZink Center; Attendance: 8,437; Referees: Robert Lottermoser, Sašo Petek, Uroš Nikolić

5 April 2019	Fenerbahçe Beko (Turkey)	78–75	(Israel) Maccabi Tel Aviv	Istanbul
19:45	Scoring by quarter: 20–20, 21–21, 10–18, 27–16
	Pts: Sloukas 22; Rebs: Kalinić 11; Asts: Sloukas 5 PIR: Sloukas 24	Boxscore	Pts: Black 23; Rebs: Black, Caloiaro 7 Asts: Pargo 4 PIR: Black 28	Arena: Ülker Sports and Event Hall; Attendance: 10,432; Referees: Saša Pukl, Juan Carlos García González, Mehdi Difallah

5 April 2019	Bayern Munich (Germany)	84–77	(Spain) Herbalife Gran Canaria	Munich
20:00	Scoring by quarter: 26–20, 18–15, 29–18, 11–24
	Pts: Williams 20; Rebs: Barthel, Williams 6 Asts: Jović 8 PIR: Williams 19	Boxscore	Pts: Vene 19; Rebs: three players 4 Asts: Radičević 4 PIR: Vene 24	Arena: Audi Dome; Attendance: 4,037; Referees: Luigi Lamonica, Mario Majkić, Eduard Udyanskyy

5 April 2019	Olympiacos (Greece)	99–74	(Turkey) Darüşşafaka Tekfen	Piraeus
20:30	Scoring by quarter: 20–28, 25–16, 30–12, 24–18
	Pts: Williams-Goss 18; Rebs: LeDay, Milutinov 6 Asts: Williams-Goss 6 PIR: Milutinov, Williams-Goss 26	Boxscore	Pts: Demir 12; Rebs: Baygül, Savas 4 Asts: Douglas 4 PIR: Evans 14	Arena: Peace and Friendship Stadium; Attendance: 4,136; Referees: Damir Javor, Carlos Peruga, Aare Halliko

5 April 2019	Barcelona Lassa (Spain)	83–74	(Russia) Khimki	Barcelona
21:00	Scoring by quarter: 21–32, 23–11, 10–15, 29–16
	Pts: Oriola 14; Rebs: Singleton, Tomić 6 Asts: Pangos 6 PIR: Tomić 19	Boxscore	Pts: Jenkins, Monia 13; Rebs: Monia 6 Asts: Harrison, Zubkov 4 PIR: Monia, Zubkov 15	Arena: Palau Blaugrana; Attendance: 4,975; Referees: Matej Boltauzer, Tomislav Hordov, Amit Balak
