= Berk Demir =

Turkish basketball player (born 1995)

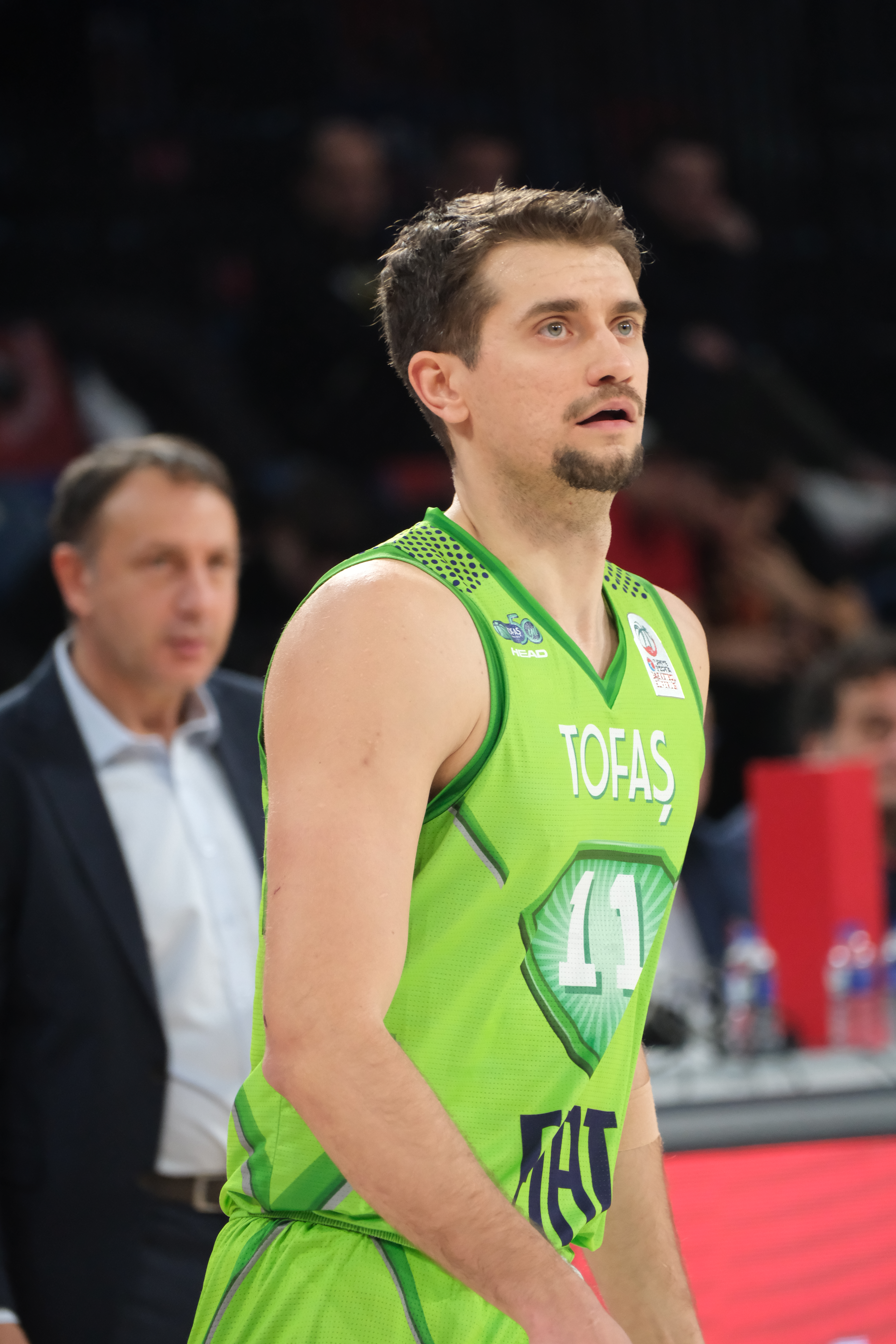
- Demir with Tofaş in 2025

No. 11 – Pizza Bulls Bordo Bandırma
- Position: Power forward
- League: BSL

Personal information
- Born: May 18, 1995 (age 31) Istanbul, Turkey
- Listed height: 6 ft 8 in (2.03 m)
- Listed weight: 220 lb (100 kg)

Career information
- College: Istanbul Technical University
- NBA draft: 2017: undrafted
- Playing career: 2011–present

Career history
- 2011–2012: İTÜ B.K.
- 2011–2012: Anadolu Efes
- 2012–2016: İTÜ B.K.
- 2016–2018: Anadolu Efes
- 2018–2021: Darüşşafaka
- 2021–2023: Türk Telekom
- 2023–2024: Darüşşafaka
- 2024–2025: Tofaş
- 2025–2026: Trabzonspor
- 2026–present: Bandırma Bordo Basketbol

Berk Demir (born May 18, 1995) is a Turkish professional basketball player for Pizza Bulls Bordo Bandırma of the Basketbol Süper Ligi (BSL). He previously played college basketball at Istanbul Technical University. He plays at the power forward position.

== College career ==
Demir began playing college basketball as early as age 16 during the 2011-12 season for the İTÜ B.K. at Istanbul Technical University. He played 13 games and averaged 2.4 points, 1.5 rebounds and 0.1 assists.

== Professional career ==
Demir joined the Turkish Basketball League while still in his teens and played for the Anadolu Efes during the 2011-12 season. In his only game played with the team, Demir averaged 6.0 points, 8.0 rebounds and 1.0 blocks.

He returned to İTÜ B.K. in 2012 and played for the team in 106 games until 2016, averaging a combined total of 27.6 points, 17.1 rebounds and 2.3 assists.

In 2016, Demir returned to Anadolu Efes and played until 2018. He played 22 games and averaged a combined total of 2.6 points, 2.0 rebounds and 0.5 rebounds.

Demir entered the 2017 NBA draft in which he was not selected.

In 2018, Demir signed with Darüşşafaka.

On June 12, 2021, he has signed with Türk Telekom of the Turkish Basketbol Süper Ligi (BSL).

On July 16, 2023, after two years break, he signed with Darüşşafaka Lassa of the Basketbol Süper Ligi (BSL) for a second stint.

On July 3, 2024, he signed with Tofaş of Basketbol Süper Ligi (BSL).

On June 1, 2025, he signed with Trabzonspor of the Basketbol Süper Ligi (BSL).

On June 13, 2026, he signed with Bandırma Bordo Basketbol of the Basketbol Süper Ligi (BSL).
