= List of indoor arenas in Europe =

This is a list of indoor arenas in Europe by capacity. A broad definition of "Europe" is used here, including the entirety of Armenia, Azerbaijan, Georgia, Kazakhstan, Russia, and Turkey.

The following is a list of arenas ordered by seating capacity, which is the maximum number of seated spectators the arena can accommodate for a sports event. Only the capacity for indoor sports, such as basketball, badminton, handball, ice hockey, tennis and volleyball, are included. Currently all arenas with a minimum capacity of 10,000 are included, some of which do not regularly host any sports. There is typically more capacity available if additional/temporary seats and standing room is included (i.e. for hosting concerts and other events like boxing). Other types of indoor event venues (such as a convention center) which can be used as an arena are not included unless the arena is housed in a separate designated part of the building or complex.

== Current arenas by seating capacity ==
=== Capacity of at least 15,000 for sports including standing places ===
Arena	Capacity	Opened	Location	Country	Image
Plenitude Arena	30,681	2017	Nanterre	France	
Co-op Live	23,500	2024	Manchester	United Kingdom	
Manchester Arena	23,000	1995	Manchester	United Kingdom	
SKA Arena	22,500	2023	Saint Petersburg	Russia	
MVM Dome	20,028	2021	Budapest	Hungary	
Roig Arena	20,000	2025	Valencia	Spain	
The O_{2} Arena	20,000	2007	London	United Kingdom	
Lanxess Arena	19,500	1998	Cologne	Germany	
Sportpaleis	18,575	1933	Antwerp	Belgium	
Belgrade Arena	18,386	2004	Belgrade	Serbia	
Nikos Galis Olympic Indoor Hall	18,300	1995	Athens	Greece	
Palau Sant Jordi	17,960	1990	Barcelona	Spain	
O_{2} Arena	17,383	2004	Prague	Czechia	
Ziggo Dome	17,000	2012	Amsterdam	Netherlands	
Inalpi Arena	16,600	2005	Turin	Italy	
Arena Zagreb	16,500	2008	Zagreb	Croatia	
Rotterdam Ahoy	16,426	1950	Rotterdam	Netherlands	
Wiener Stadthalle	16,152	1958	Vienna	Austria	
Sinan Erdem Dome	16,000	2010	Istanbul	Turkey	
Forum di Milano	15,800	1990	Milan	Italy	
Utilita Arena Birmingham	15,800	1991	Birmingham	United Kingdom	
bp pulse LIVE	15,685	1980	Birmingham	United Kingdom	
Accor Arena	15,609	1984	Paris	France	
Fernando Buesa Arena	15,544	1991	Vitoria-Gasteiz	Spain	
Žalgiris Arena	15,415	2011	Kaunas	Lithuania	
Bizkaia Arena	15,414	2004	Barakaldo	Spain	
Olympiahalle München	15,273	1972	Munich	Germany	
Minsk-Arena	15,086	2009	Minsk	Belarus	
Tauron Arena Kraków	15,030	2014	Kraków	Poland	
ING Arena	15,000	2013	Brussels	Belgium	
Ülker Sports and Event Hall	15,000	2012	Istanbul	Turkey	
Movistar Arena	15,000	1960	Madrid	Spain	
MEO Arena	15,000	1998	Lisbon	Portugal	
Uber Arena	15,000	2008	Berlin	Germany	
Unity Arena	15,000	2009	Bærum	Norway	

=== Capacity of below 15,000 for sports ===
Arena	Capacity	Opened	Location	Country	Image
Peace and Friendship Stadium	14,940	1983	Piraeus	Greece	
Hanns-Martin-Schleyer-Halle	14,937	1983	Stuttgart	Germany	
SAP Arena	14,500	2005	Mannheim	Germany	
PSD Bank Dome	14,282	2006	Düsseldorf	Germany	
Palacio Vistalegre	14,000	2000	Madrid	Spain	
Veikkaus Arena	14,000	1997	Helsinki	Finland	
CSKA Arena	14,000	2015	Moscow	Russia	
Megasport Arena	13,998	2006	Moscow	Russia	
Avicii Arena	13,850	1989	Stockholm	Sweden	
Atlas Arena	13,806	2009	Łódź	Poland	
First Direct Arena	13,781	2013	Leeds	United Kingdom	
Gliwice Arena	13,752	2018	Gliwice	Poland	
Utilita Arena Sheffield	13,600	1991	Sheffield	United Kingdom	
Nokia Arena	13,455	2021	Tampere	Finland	
Sportovní hala Fortuna	13,150	1962	Prague	Czechia	
Barclays Arena	13,000	2002	Hamburg	Germany	
Royal Arena	13,000	2017	Copenhagen	Denmark	
Palau Municipal d'Esports de Badalona	12,760	1991	Badalona	Spain	
Arena Brno	12,714	2026	Brno	Czechia	
Rudolf Weber-Arena	12,650	1996	Oberhausen	Germany	
Malmö Arena	12,600	2009	Malmö	Sweden	
UMMC Arena	12,588	2025	Yekaterinburg	Russia	
LDLC Arena	12,523	2023	Lyon	France	
Jyske Bank Boxen	12,500	2010	Herning	Denmark	
Thialf	12,500	1967	Heerenveen	Netherlands	
OVO Arena Wembley	12,500	1934	London	United Kingdom	
Arena Stožice	12,480	2010	Ljubljana	Slovenia	
Caja Mágica	12,442	2009	Madrid	Spain	
St. Jakobshalle	12,400	1976	Basel	Switzerland	
Arena Sofia	12,373	2011	Sofia	Bulgaria	
Volga Arena	12,350	2026	Nizhny Novgorod	Russia	
Spaladium Arena	12,339	2009	Split	Croatia	
Scandinavium	12,312	1971	Gothenburg	Sweden	
OVO Hydro	12,306	2013	Glasgow	United Kingdom	
Ice Palace Saint Petersburg	12,300	2000	Saint Petersburg	Russia	
VTB Arena	12,273	2019	Moscow	Russia	
Galaxie d'Amnéville	12,200	1990	Amnéville	France	
Zénith de Strasbourg	12,079	2008	Strasbourg	France	
Bolshoy Ice Dome	12,035	2012	Sochi	Russia	
G-Drive Arena	12,011	2022	Omsk	Russia	
Hallenstadion	12,000	1939	Zürich	Switzerland	
Papp László Budapest Sportaréna	12,000	2003	Budapest	Hungary	
PostFinance Arena	12,000	1967	Bern	Switzerland	
Westfalenhallen	12,000	1952	Dortmund	Germany	
Palais des sports de Grenoble	12,000	1967	Grenoble	France	
Zetra Olympic Hall	12,000	1983	Sarajevo	Bosnia and Herzegovina	
Iceberg Skating Palace	12,000	2012	Sochi	Russia	
Swiss Life Arena	12,000	2022	Zurich	Switzerland	
Madrid Arena	12,000	2002	Madrid	Spain	
PalaItalia	12,000	2026	Milan	Italy	
Gatorade Center	11,820	1990	Turku	Finland	
Sibir Arena	11,650	2023	Novosibirsk	Russia	
Gran Canaria Arena	11,500	2014	Las Palmas	Spain	
Håkons Hall	11,500	1993	Lillehammer	Norway	
SAP Garden	11,500	2024	Munich	Germany	
Ergo Arena	11,409	2010	Gdańsk/Sopot	Poland	
Palacio de Deportes José María Martín Carpena	11,300	1999	Málaga	Spain	
Arēna Rīga	11,200	2006	Riga	Latvia	
PalaLottomatica	11,200	1960	Rome	Italy	
Plaza de Toros de La Ribera	11,046	2001	Logroño	Spain	
Spodek	11,036	1971	Katowice	Poland	
MTS Live Arena	11,000	2022	Odintsovo	Russia	
Coliseum da Coruña	11,000	1991	A Coruña	Spain	
Unipol Arena	11,000	1993	Casalecchio di Reno	Italy	
Centennial Hall	11,000	1913	Wrocław	Poland	
ZAG-Arena	10,767	2000	Hanover	Germany	
Hall XXL	10,750	2013	Nantes	France	
Pabellón Príncipe Felipe	10,744	1990	Zaragoza	Spain	
Sud de France Arena	10,700	2010	Montpellier	France	
Iradier Arena	10,625	1941	Vitoria-Gasteiz	Spain	
M&S Bank Arena	10,600	2008	Liverpool	United Kingdom	
ÖVB Arena	10,500	2004	Bremen	Germany	
Menora Mivtachim Arena	10,383	1963	Tel Aviv	Israel	
Vitrifrigo Arena	10,323	1996	Pesaro	Italy	
Enteria arena	10,300	1960	Pardubice	Czechia	
P&J Live	10,264	2019	Aberdeen	United Kingdom	
Sparkassen-Arena	10,250	1951	Kiel	Germany	
Plaza de Toros de Illumbe	10,241	1998	San Sebastián	Spain	
Palacio Municipal de Deportes San Pablo	10,200	1988	Seville	Spain	
Belgorod Arena	10,105	2021	Belgorod	Russia	
Tipos aréna	10,055	2011	Bratislava	Slovakia	
Bilbao Arena	10,014	2010	Bilbao	Spain	
Max-Schmeling-Halle	10,012	1996	Berlin	Germany	
Arena Vilnius	10,000	2004	Vilnius	Lithuania	
León Arena	10,000	2000	Léon	Spain	
Plaza de Toros La Cubierta	10,000	1997	Leganés	Spain	
Motorpoint Arena Nottingham	10,000	2000	Nottingham	United Kingdom	
BTarena	10,000	2014	Cluj-Napoca	Romania	
CO'Met Arena	10,000	2023	Orléans	France	
Basketball Development Center	10,000	2024	Istanbul	Turkey	

=== Current arenas that can be used for football ===
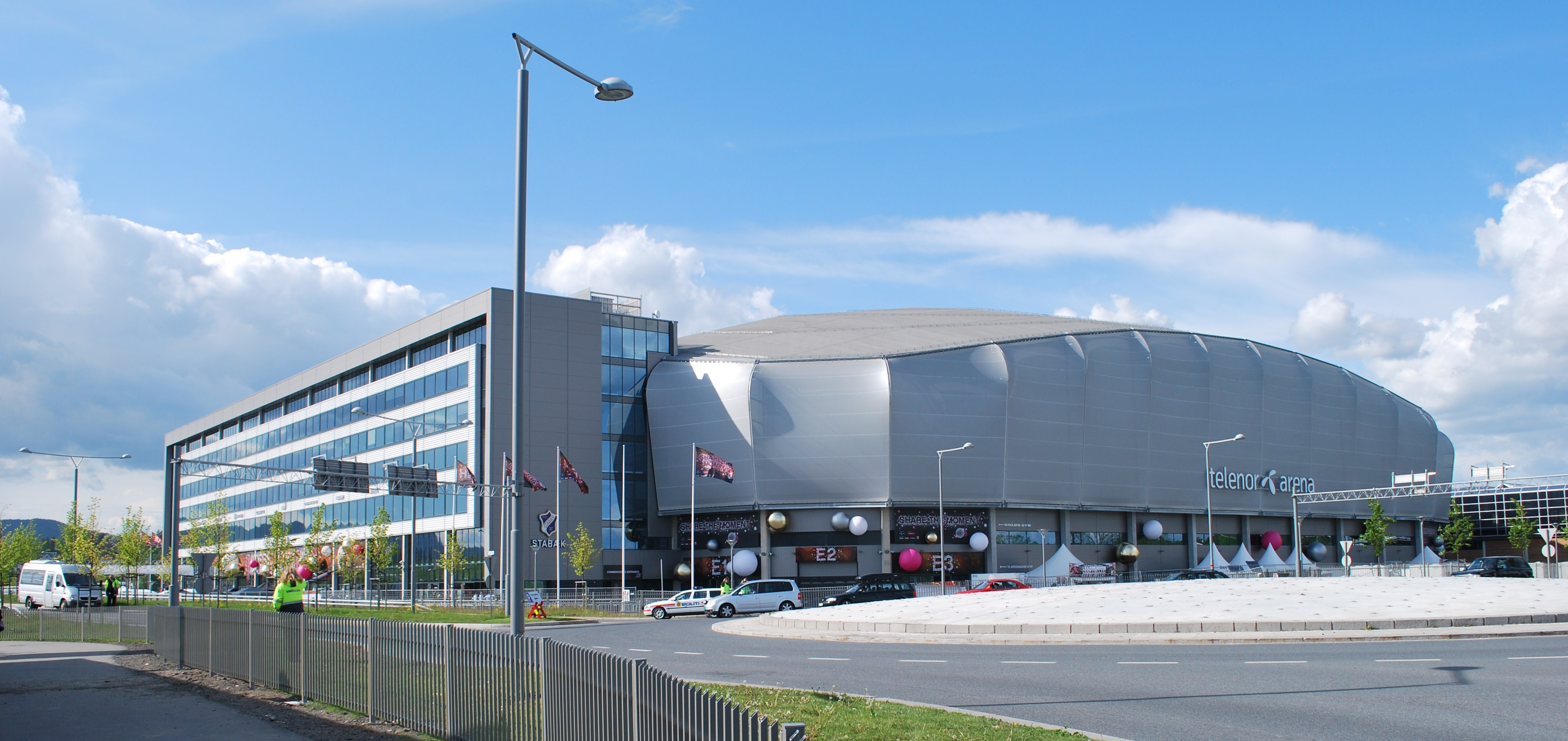
Telenor Arena, Bærum

Currently these arenas are primarily used for indoor sports and/or other events i.e. music concerts, but can also receive association football or rugby matches in the winter, unlike the US and Canada domes, which are enclosed stadiums primarily used for outdoor sports.

Telenor Arena could be considered the only dome in Europe from its opening in 2009 until 2011, when the association football club Stabæk used it for their home matches before returning to their old home, Nadderud Stadion, as the club couldn't support the rent to play at Telenor Arena. The next multi-purpose indoor arena to open in Europe was Paris La Défense Arena in 2017.

Arena	Capacities		Opened	Location	Country
Arena	Sport	Concerts	Opened	Location	Country
Paris La Défense Arena	30,000	40,000	2017	Nanterre	France
Unity Arena	15,000	25,000	2009	Bærum	Norway
Vikingskipet	10,600	20,000	1992	Hamar	Norway
Egilshöllin	2,000	18,000	2002	Reykjavík	Iceland
Vallhall Arena	5,500	12,500	2001	Oslo	Norway
Hala Widowiskowo-Sportowa MOSiR (Note: Since 2020, 100 × 50 m playing field with artificial turf, previously 110.5 × 53.5 m with synthetic rubber.)	1,777	5,000	1975	Zabrze	Poland

== Arenas under construction ==
Arena	Capacity	Opening	Location	Country
DD Arena	22,268	2030	Pardubice	Czechia
Aviva Arena	20,000	2028	Bristol	United Kingdom
Illunbe Berria	18,500	2030	San Sebastián	Spain
New Cardiff Bay Arena	15,348	2028	Cardiff	United Kingdom
New Olimpiyskiy Arena	12,000	2028	Moscow	Russia
New Luzhniki Palace of Sports	12,000	2028	Moscow	Russia
Sala Polivalentă	10,059	TBA	Brașov	Romania
Perm Ice Palace	10,000	2027	Perm	Russia
New CSKA Ice Palace	10,000	2028	Moscow	Russia

== Proposed arenas ==
Arena	Capacity	First proposed	Location	Country
Hala Narodowa	22,000	2014	Warsaw	Poland
Wien Holding Arena	20,000	2020	Vienna	Austria
Arena Polivalentă	20,000	2019	Bucharest	Romania
Munich Arena	20,000	2022	Munich	Germany
Madrid Arena	20,000	2025	Madrid	Spain
Suvilahti Arena	17,000	2023	Helsinki	Finland
Arena 3.3	17,000	2023	Vantaa	Finland
Sala Polivalentă	16,000	2020	Timișoara	Romania
New Scandinavium Arena	16,000	2023	Gothenburg	Sweden
Kyiv Arena	15,800	2022	Kyiv	Ukraine
Nou Palau Blaugrana	15,000	2016	Barcelona	Spain
New London Lions Arena	15,000	2025	London	United Kingdom
Helsinki Garden	14,000	2020	Helsinki	Finland
Frankfurt Arena	13,500	2022	Frankfurt	Germany
The Sage	12,500	2018	Gateshead	United Kingdom
New Drammen Arena	12,000	2020	Drammen	Norway
Bergen Byarena	11,000	2018	Bergen	Norway
WeArena	10,500	2018	Reggio Emilia	Italy
Sala Polivalentă Regina Maria	10,212	2019	Iași	Romania
Oulu Arena	10,000	2023	Oulu	Finland
Uppsala Eventcenter	10,000	2013	Uppsala	Sweden
Sunderland Arena	10,000	2022	Sunderland	United Kingdom
Dundee Arena	10,000	2022	Dundee	United Kingdom
Lviv Colosseum	10,000	2022	Lviv	Ukraine
Ratapiha Arena	10,000	2017	Turku	Finland
New Hovet Arena	10,000	2026	Stockholm	Sweden

== See also ==
- List of indoor arenas
- List of indoor arenas by capacity
- Lists of stadiums
- List of covered stadiums by capacity
- List of association football stadiums by capacity
- List of European stadiums by capacity
