= List of indoor arenas in Spain =

The following is a list of indoor arenas in Spain, ordered by a seating capacity.

The venues are by their final capacity after construction for seating-only events. There is more capacity if standing room is included (e.g. for concerts). All venues with at least 5,000 seats are listed.

== Current arenas ==
| Image | Stadium | Capacity (seats) | City | Autonomous Community | Team | Inaugurated |
|---|---|---|---|---|---|---|
| | Palau Sant Jordi | 16,159 | Barcelona | Catalonia | None | 1990 |
| | Roig Arena | 15,600 | Valencia | Valencia | Valencia Basket | 2025 |
| | Buesa Arena | 15,504 | Vitoria-Gasteiz | Basque Country | Baskonia | 1991 |
| | Bizkaia Arena | 15,414 | Barakaldo | Basque Country | None | 2004 |
| | Movistar Arena | 15,000 | Madrid | Madrid | Estudiantes; Real Madrid | 1960 |
| | Vistalegre | 14,240 | Madrid | Madrid | None | 2000 |
| | Navarra Arena | 13,613 | Pamplona | Navarre | None | 2018 |
| | Olímpic de Badalona | 12,760 | Badalona | Catalonia | Joventut Badalona | 1991 |
| | Caja Mágica | 12,427 | Madrid | Madrid | None | 2009 |
| | Illumbe | 11,000 | San Sebastián | Basque Country | Gipuzkoa Basket | 1998 |
| | Plaza de Toros de La Ribera | 11,000 | Logroño | La Rioja | Bullfighting | 2001 |
| | Pabellón Príncipe Felipe | 10,744 | Zaragoza | Aragon | Basket Zaragoza | 1990 |
| | Martín Carpena | 10,699 | Málaga | Andalusia | Unicaja | 1999 |
| | Madrid Arena | 10,276 | Madrid | Madrid | None | 2002 |
| | Bilbao Arena | 10,014 | Bilbao | Basque Country | Bilbao Basket | 2010 |
| | León Arena | 10,000 | León | Castile and León | Bullfighting | 1948 |
| | La Cubierta | 10,000 | Leganés | Madrid | Bullfighting | 1997 |
| | Gran Canaria Arena | 9,870 | Las Palmas | Canary Islands | CB Gran Canaria | 2014 |
| | Coliseum Burgos | 9,604 | Burgos | Castile and León | San Pablo Burgos | 1967 |
| | Coliseum da Coruña | 9,300 | A Coruña | Galicia | Básquet Coruña | 1991 |
| | La Fonteta | 8,500 | Valencia | Valencia | None | 1983 |
| | Palacio de Deportes | 8,100 | Granada | Andalusia | Fundación CB Granada | 1991 |
| | Iradier Arena | 7,827 | Vitoria-Gasteiz | Basque Country | Bullfighting | 1941 |
| | San Pablo | 7,626 | Seville | Andalusia | Caja'87 | 1999 |
| | Palau Blaugrana | 7,585 | Barcelona | Catalonia | FC Barcelona | 1971 |
| | Palacio de Deportes | 7,454 | Murcia | Murcia | UCAM Murcia; ElPozo Murcia | 1994 |
| | Polideportivo Pisuerga | 6,800 | Valladolid | Castile and León | CB Ciudad de Valladolid | 1985 |
| | Palma Arena | 6,607 | Palma de Mallorca | Balearic Islands | None | 2007 |
| | Olivo Arena | 6,580 | Jaén | Andalusia | Jaén FS | 2021 |
| | Velódromo Luis Puig | 6,500 | Valencia | Valencia | None | 1992 |
| | Multiusos Ciudad de Cáceres | 6,500 | Cáceres | Extremadura | Cáceres Cdad Bto | 1999 |
| | Barris Nord | 6,100 | Lleida | Catalonia | Força Lleida | 2001 |
| | L'Àgora | 6,075 | Valencia | Valencia | None | 2009 |
| | Arnedo Arena | 6,018 | Arnedo | La Rioja | Bullfighting | 2010 |
| | Pabellón Ciutat de Castelló | 6,000 | Castellón | Valencia | AB Castelló; CFS Bisontes Castellón | 1994 |
| | Palacio de Deportes | 6,000 | Santander | Cantabria | CD Estela | 2003 |
| | Multiusos de Guadalajara | 5,894 | Guadalajara | Castile-La Mancha | Ciudad de Guadalajara | 2010 |
| | Quijote Arena | 5,863 | Ciudad Real | Castile-La Mancha | BM Alarcos Ciudad Real | 1992 |
| | Polideportivo Fernando Martín | 5,700 | Fuenlabrada | Madrid | Baloncesto Fuenlabrada | 1991 |
| | Pazo Paco Paz | 5,500 | Ourense | Galicia | Club Ourense Baloncesto | 1988 |
| | Fontajau | 5,500 | Girona | Catalonia | Bàsquet Girona; Uni Girona CB | 1993 |
| | Pabellón Pedro Ferrándiz | 5,425 | Alicante | Valencia | Lucentum Alicante | 1993 |
| | Palacio de Deportes | 5,340 | Oviedo | Asturias | Oviedo CB | 1975 |
| | Pazo dos Deportes | 5,310 | Lugo | Galicia | CB Breogán | 1992 |
| | Plaza de Toros de Illescas | 5,280 | Illescas | Castile-La Mancha | Bullfighting | 2007 |
| | Palau d'Esports de Granollers | 5,207 | Granollers | Catalonia | BM Granollers | 1991 |
| | Centro Insular de Deportes | 5,200 | Las Palmas | Canary Islands | CB Islas Canarias; CV Las Palmas; Gran Canaria FS | 1988 |
| | Palacio de Deportes | 5,197 | Gijón | Asturias | AB Gijón Jovellanos; Círculo Gijón; Gijón Basket | 1992 |
| | Palacio de Deportes | 5,188 | León | Castile and León | CB Ademar León; CB Agustinos Eras; Basket León | 1970 |
| | Palacio de Deportes | 5,150 | Huelva | Andalusia | None | 1999 |
| | Pavelló Menorca | 5,115 | Mahón | Balearic Islands | CB Menorca | 2005 |
| | Santiago Martín | 5,100 | La Laguna | Canary Islands | CB Canarias | 1999 |
| | Son Moix | 5,076 | Palma de Mallorca | Balearic Islands | CB Bahía San Agustín | 1976 |
| | Fontes do Sar | 5,065 | Santiago de Compostela | Galicia | Obradoiro CAB; Santiago Futsal | 1998 |
| | Velódromo de Anoeta | 5,052 | San Sebastián | Basque Country | None | 1965 |
| | Príncipes de Asturias | 5,051 | Pinto | Madrid | None | 2005 |
| | Pla d'Arc | 5,020 | Llíria | Valencia | CEB Llíria | 1992 |
| | Palacio de Deportes | 5,018 | Huesca | Aragon | CB Peñas Huesca; BM Huesca | 1990 |
| | Pabellón Municipal | 5,016 | Palencia | Castile and León | Palencia Baloncesto | 1979 |
| | Tarraco Arena Plaça | 5,000 | Tarragona | Catalonia | None | 1883 |
| | La Casilla | 5,000 | Bilbao | Basque Country | None | 1967 |
| | Riazor | 5,000 | A Coruña | Galicia | Básquet Coruña; HC Liceo | 1970 |
| | A Malata | 5,000 | Ferrol | Galicia | Ferrol CB; O Parrulo FS | 1983 |
| | Nou Congost | 5,000 | Manresa | Catalonia | Bàsquet Manresa | 1992 |
| | Multiusos Sánchez Paraíso | 5,000 | Salamanca | Castile and León | None | 2002 |
| | Mediterráneo | 5,000 | Almería | Andalusia | CV Almería | 2004 |

== Future arenas ==
| Arena | Capacity | City | Autonomous Community | Team | Start/end |
|---|---|---|---|---|---|
| Nou Palau Blaugrana | 15,000 | Barcelona | Catalonia | FC Barcelona | 2021– |

== See also ==
- List of football stadiums in Spain
- List of indoor arenas in Europe
- List of indoor arenas by capacity
- Lists of stadiums
- Bullring
