= Akeem Ennis-Brown =

British boxer (born 1995)

Personal information
- Nickname: Riiddy
- Born: 14 September 1995 (age 31) Gloucester, England
- Height: 5 ft 11 in (180 cm)
- Weight: Light-welterweight

Boxing career
- Reach: 70 in (178 cm)
- Stance: Orthodox

Boxing record
- Total fights: 16
- Wins: 15
- Win by KO: 1
- Losses: 1
Medal record
Men's amateur boxing
English Junior Championships
Bronze medal – third place	2013 Portsmouth	Light welterweight

Akeem Ennis-Brown (14 September 1995) is an English professional boxer who held the British and Commonwealth light-welterweight titles from 2020 to August 2021.

== Professional career ==
Ennis-Brown made his professional debut on 11 July 2015, scoring a four-round points decision (PTS) victory against Ibrar Riyaz at the Chase Leisure Centre in Cannock, Staffordshire. After compiling a record of 8–0 (1 KO) he faced reigning champion Glenn Foot for the English light-welterweight title on 16 July 2017 at the Stadium of Light in Sunderland. Brown captured his first professional title via majority decision (MD) over ten rounds. Two judges scored the bout in favour of Brown at 98–92 and 96–94 while the third judge scored it a draw at 95–95.

Following a six-round PTS victory against Chris Truman in September, he faced Chris Jenkins for the vacant WBC Youth light-welterweight title on 12 May 2018 at the GL1 Leisure Centre in Gloucester. Jenkins suffered a cut above his right eye in the third round after an accidental clash of heads. On the advice of the ringside doctor, the referee called a halt to the contest in the fifth round, forcing the result to the scorecards. All three judges scored the bout in favour of Ennis-Brown at 40–36, 39–37, and 39–38, awarding him the WBC Youth title via unanimous technical decision (TD).

His next fight was against Darragh Foley for the vacant IBF European light-welterweight title on 14 December 2018 at the York Hall in London. Ennis-Brown captured the IBF regional title with a comfortable unanimous decision (UD), with the judges scorecards reading 98–92, 97–93, and 96–94.

Ennis-Brown made a successful defence of his IBF European title with a ten-round UD victory against Bilal Rehman in March 2019, before challenging Commonwealth light-welterweight champion Philip Bowes, with the vacant British light-welterweight title also on the line, on 2 September 2020 at the Production Park Studios in South Kirkby, West Yorkshire. In a fight which saw both men suffer cuts and Bowes receive a point deduction in the eighth round for excessive holding, Ennis-Brown secured a unanimous decision victory to capture the British and Commonwealth titles. One judge scored the bout 116–111 and the other two scored it 115–112.

He lost his titles in his first defense, going down to a unanimous decision defeat against Sam Maxwell at Arena Birmingham on 28 August 2021.

He defeated Daniel Alejandro Combi by unanimous decision at Vale Sports Arena in Cardiff on 26 November 2021, to win the vacant WBC International super-lightweight title.

== Professional boxing record ==
16 fights	15 wins	1 loss
By knockout	1	0
By decision	14	1

No.	Result	Record	Opponent	Type	Round, time	Date	Location	Notes
16	Win	15–1	Daniel Alejandro Combi	UD	10	26 Nov 2021	Vale Sports Arena, Cardiff, Wales	Won vacant WBC International super-lightweight title
15	Loss	14–1	Sam Maxwell	UD	12	28 Aug 2021	Arena Birmingham, Birmingham, England	Lost Commonwealth and British light-welterweight titles
14	Win	14–0	Philip Bowes	UD	12	2 Sep 2020	Production Park Studios, South Kirkby, England	Won Commonwealth and vacant British light-welterweight titles
13	Win	13–0	Bilal Rehman	UD	10	1 Mar 2019	Vale Sports Arena, Cardiff, Wales	Retained IBF European light-welterweight title
12	Win	12–0	Darragh Foley	UD	10	14 Dec 2018	York Hall, London, England	Won vacant IBF European light-welterweight title
11	Win	11–0	Chris Jenkins	TD	5 (10), 1:29	12 May 2018	GL1 Leisure Centre, Gloucester, England	Won vacant WBC Youth light-welterweight title; Unanimous TD after Jenkins was cut by an accidental head clash
10	Win	10–0	Chris Truman	PTS	6	23 Sep 2017	PlayFootball Arena, Swindon, England	
9	Win	9–0	Glenn Foot	MD	10	16 Jul 2017	Stadium of Light, Sunderland, England	Won English light-welterweight title
8	Win	8–0	Lukasz Janik	PTS	6	15 Apr 2017	PlayFootball Arena, Swindon, England	
7	Win	7–0	Freddy Kiwitt	PTS	10	12 Nov 2016	York Hall, London, England	
6	Win	6–0	Chris Adaway	PTS	4	23 Jul 2016	Tewkesbury School, Tewkesbury, England	
5	Win	5–0	Kristian Laight	PTS	4	10 Jun 2016	Grange Leisure Centre, Swindon, England	
4	Win	4–0	Csaba Bolcskei	TKO	5 (8), 2:09	13 Feb 2016	GL1 Leisure Centre, Gloucester, England	
3	Win	3–0	Fonz Alexander	PTS	4	20 Dec 2015	Grange Leisure Centre, Swindon, England	
2	Win	2–0	Liam Richards	PTS	4	12 Sep 2015	GL1 Leisure Centre, Gloucester, England	
1	Win	1–0	Ibrar Riyaz	PTS	4	11 Jul 2015	Chase Leisure Centre, Cannock, England	

Sporting positions
Regional boxing titles
Preceded by Glenn Foot	English light-welterweight champion 16 July 2017 – March 2018	Vacant Title next held by Sam O'Maison
Vacant Title last held by Yomar Álamo	WBC Youth light-welterweight champion 12 May 2018 – November 2018	Vacant Title next held by Luis Alberto Hernandez
Vacant Title last held by Josh Leather	IBF European light-welterweight champion 14 December 2018 – present	Incumbent
Vacant Title last held by Robbie Davies Jr.	British light-welterweight champion 2 September 2020 – 28 August 2021	Succeeded by Sam Maxwell
Preceded by Philip Bowes	Commonwealth light-welterweight champion 2 September 2020 – 28 August 2021	Succeeded by Sam Maxwell
