= Sam Maxwell =

Sam Maxwell may refer to:

- Sam Maxwell (boxer) (born 1988), English professional boxer
- Sam Maxwell (weightlifter) (born 1964), American former weightlifter
