= Andrea Scarpa =

Italian boxer (born 1987)

Personal information
- Nickname: Sugar Ray
- Born: 3 June 1987 (age 39) Foggia, Apulia, Italy
- Height: 183 cm (6 ft 0 in)
- Weight: Super-featherweight; Light-welterweight

Boxing career
- Stance: Orthodox

Boxing record
- Total fights: 33
- Wins: 27
- Win by KO: 11
- Losses: 6

Andrea Pio Scarpa (born 3 June 1987) is an Italian professional boxer. He held the WBC Silver light-welterweight title in 2016 and challenged twice for the European light-welterweight title in 2018 and 2019.

== Professional career ==
Scarpa made his professional debut on 9 April 2011, scoring a fourth-round technical knockout (TKO) victory over Cristian Spataru in Biella, Italy.

He went on to lose his next two fights by points decision (PTS) – against Carmine Tommasone in June and Vincenzo Finiello in July 2011 – before embarking on a six fight winning streak, after which he faced Nicola Cipolletta for the vacant Italian super-featherweight title. The bout took place on 27 July 2012 in Castel Volturno, Italy, with Scarpa capturing the Italian title via ninth-round knockout (KO). He scored a TKO win against Istvan Petrovics in a non-title fight in October before successfully defending his Italian title via TKO against Floriano Pagliara in January 2013.

In his next fight he moved up in weight to challenge Italian light-welterweight champion Renato De Donato on 21 June 2013 at the Centro Sportivo Crespi in Milan, Italy. Scarpa knocked Donato to the canvas in the seventh round. After making it back to his feet before the referee's count of ten, the champion was met with a flurry of punches to prompt the referee to call a halt to the contest, handing Scarpa the Italian light-welterweight title via seventh-round TKO.

After scoring six more wins in non-title fights, two by stoppage, he faced Francesco Acatullo for the vacant Italian light-welterweight title on 24 January 2015 at the Palasport Piscine Italcementi in Bergamo, Italy. After a back-and-forth contest Scarpa captured the title for a second time, defeating Acatullo via unanimous decision (UD) over ten rounds. Two judges scored the bout 98–92 and the third scored it 97–93.

He successfully defended his Italian title with a KO victory over Emanuele De Prophetis in June before facing Lyes Chaibi for the vacant IBF Inter-Continental light-welterweight title on 27 November 2015 at the Palasport Le Cupole in Turin, Italy. Scarpa captured his third professional title, defeating Prophetis via UD over twelve rounds with the scorecards reading 116–111, 115–112, and 115–113.

He next faced John Wayne Hibbert for the vacant WBC Silver light-welterweight title on 25 June 2015, fighting abroad for the first time in his career at The O2 Arena in London. The fight was televised live on Sky Sports Box Office as part of the undercard for Anthony Joshua vs. Dominic Breazeale. Scarpa connected with a left hook in the second round which opened a cut above Hibbert's right eye. The cut began to worsen over the next few rounds and after an examination by the ringside doctor in the sixth – who deemed the cut too severe for Hibbert to continue – the referee called a halt to the contest, handing Scarpa the WBC Silver title via sixth round TKO.

He returned to England for the first defence of his title, facing Ohara Davies on 26 November 2016 at The SSE Arena in London. In what was described as a dominant performance by Davies, Scarpa lost his WBC Silver title by a shutout UD with all three judges scoring the bout 120–108.

He bounced back from defeat with two six-round PTS victories in 2017 – against Juan Ocura in May and Giorgi Abramishvili in June – before challenging the European Union light-welterweight champion Franck Petitjean on 20 January 2018 at the Palais des sports Marcel-Cerdan in Paris. Scarpa suffered the fourth defeat of his career, losing by UD with the judges' scorecards reading 115–113, 116–112, and 117–111.

Following a six-round PTS victory against Luka Leskovic in May he faced Joe Hughes for the vacant European light-welterweight title on 30 November 2018 at the Teatro Obi Hall in Florence, Italy. Scarpa lost the bout by split decision (SD) to suffer his fifth professional defeat. One judge scored the bout 116–112 in favour of Scarpa while the other two judges scored it 116–112 and 118–110 for Hughes.

After a stoppage victory by corner retirement (RTD) against Ivan Njegac in April 2019, he made a second attempt for the vacant European title, facing Sandor Martin on 27 July at the Pabellón Francisco Calvo in Barcelona, Spain. Scarpa lost in his attempt by ninth-round RTD. At the time of the stoppage he was behind on all three judges' scorecards at 90–81, having lost all nine rounds.

== Professional boxing record ==
33 fights	27 wins	6 losses
By knockout	11	1
By decision	16	5

No.	Result	Record	Opponent	Type	Round, time	Date	Location	Notes
33	Win	27–6	Giorgi Makharashvili	PTS	6	28 May 2022	Moncalieri, Italy	
32	Win	26–6	Luigi Mantegna	PTS	6	4 Dec 2021	Moncalieri, Italy	
31	Win	25–6	Giuseppe Rauseo	PTS	6	16 Oct 2021	Biella, Italy	
30	Loss	24–6	Sandor Martin	RTD	9 (12), 3:00	27 Jul 2019	Pabellón Francisco Calvo, Barcelona, Spain	For vacant European light-welterweight title
29	Win	24–5	Ivan Njegac	RTD	3 (6), 3:00	6 Apr 2019	Carpiano, Italy	
28	Loss	23–5	Joe Hughes	SD	12	30 Nov 2018	Teatro Obi Hall, Florence, Italy	For European light-welterweight title
27	Win	23–4	Gabriel Mohamed Ahmed	PTS	6	19 May 2018	Moncalieri, Italy	
26	Loss	22–4	Franck Petitjean	UD	12	20 Jan 2018	Palais des sports Marcel-Cerdan, Paris, France	For European Union light-welterweight title
25	Win	22–3	Giorgi Abramishvili	PTS	6	17 Jun 2017	Casino de la Vallee, Saint-Vincent, Italy	
24	Win	21–3	Juan Ocura	PTS	6	13 May 2017	PalaEinaudi, Moncalieri, Italy	
23	Loss	20–3	Ohara Davies	UD	12	26 Nov 2016	The SSE Arena, London, England	Lost WBC Silver light-welterweight title
22	Win	20–2	John Wayne Hibbert	TKO	6 (12), 2:55	25 Jun 2016	The O2 Arena, London, England	Won vacant WBC Silver light-welterweight title
21	Win	19–2	Lyes Chaibi	UD	12	28 Nov 2015	Palasport Le Cupole, Turin, Italy	Won vacant IBF Inter-Continental light-welterweight title
20	Win	18–2	Emanuele de Prophetis	KO	1 (10), 2:50	20 Jun 2015	Teatro Principe, Milan, Italy	
19	Win	17–2	Francesco Acatullo	UD	10	24 Jan 2015	Palasport Piscine Italcementi, Bergamo, Italy	Won vacant Italian light-welterweight titles
18	Win	16–2	Luigi Mantegna	PTS	6	22 Nov 2014	PalaCarucci, Terracina, Italy	
17	Win	15–2	Ivans Levickis	PTS	6	19 Jul 2014	Centro Sportivo Comunale, Casteggio, Italy	Retained WBC International light-welterweight title
16	Win	14–2	Jevgenijs Fjodorovs	PTS	6	7 Jun 2014	Palasport, Tolfa, Italy	
15	Win	13–2	Benjamin Robles Murry	TKO	5 (6)	7 Mar 2014	Palasport, Giaveno, Italy	
14	Win	12–2	Mate Sebok	KO	2 (6)	26 Oct 2013	Palasport ITC, Tortolì, Italy	
13	Win	11–2	Renato de Donato	TKO	7 (10)	21 Jun 2013	Centro Sportivo Crespi, Milan, Italy	Won Italian light-welterweight title
12	Win	10–2	Floriano Pagliara	TKO	2 (10)	25 Jan 2013	Palasport Pininfarina, Santena, Italy	Retained Italian super-featherweight title
11	Win	9–2	Istvan Petrovics	TKO	2 (6)	12 Oct 2012	Palasport, Segrate, Italy	
10	Win	8–2	Nicola Cipolletta	KO	9 (10)	27 Jul 2012	Castel Volturno, Italy	Won vacant Italian super-featherweight title
9	Win	7–2	Youness Laribi	PTS	6	9 Jun 2012	Piazza del Mercato, Volvera, Italy	
8	Win	6–2	Marco Delmestro	PTS	6	5 May 2012	Moncalieri, Italy	
7	Win	5–2	Gianluca Ceglia	PTS	6	16 Mar 2012	Palaindoor di Ancona, Ancona, Italy	
6	Win	4–2	Raffaele Laezza	PTS	6	20 Nov 2011	Ravarino, Italy	
5	Win	3–2	Giuseppe Lo Faro	TKO	3 (6)	28 Oct 2011	Palasport, Enna, Sicily	
4	Win	2–2	Radoslav Mitev	PTS	6	22 Jul 2011	Bocciofila Trombetta, Turin, Italy	
3	Loss	1–2	Vincenzo Finiello	PTS	6	1 Jul 2011	PalaCaselle, Arezzo, Italy	
2	Loss	1–1	Carmine Tommasone	PTS	6	3 Jun 2011	Ristorante Villa La Tortuga, Castel Volturno, Italy	
1	Win	1–0	Cristian Spataru	TKO	4 (6)	9 Apr 2011	Biella, Italy	

Sporting positions
Regional boxing titles
Vacant Title last held by Benoit Manno	Italian super-featherweight champion 27 July 2012 – May 2013; Vacated	Vacant Title next held by Floriano Pagliara
Preceded by Renato De Donato	Italian light-welterweight champion 21 June 2013 – 2014	Vacant Title next held by Himself
Vacant Title last held by Himself	Italian light-welterweight champion 24 January 2015 – October 2015	Vacant Title next held by Renato De Donato
Vacant Title last held by Samuele Esposito	IBF Inter-Continental light-welterweight champion 28 November 2015 – 2016	Vacant Title next held by Josh Leather
Vacant Title last held by Luca Giacon	WBC Silver light-welterweight champion 25 June 2016 – 4 March 2016	Succeeded by Ohara Davies
