= Tommasone =

Tommasone is a surname. Notable people with the surname include:

- Carmine Tommasone (born 1984), Italian boxer
- Cyril Tommasone (born 1987), French gymnast
- Vincenzo Tommasone (born 1995), Italian footballer
