= List of indoor stadiums =

The following is a list of indoor stadiums, ordered by capacity. This is intended to include only stadiums that are used for sports traditionally held outdoors. It is split into two sublists:

- Stadiums designed for field sports, such any of a wide variety of football codes, baseball, and/or track and field.
- Stadiums designed for tennis (a traditional outdoor sport, but with a much smaller playing area than in field sports).

Only domed, either fully enclosed or with a skylight, and retractable roof stadiums are included, i.e. stadiums that cover both spectators and playing field. Wembley Stadium in London, which seats 90,000 spectators, is not included as the roof can only be partially closed.

== Current ==
=== Field sports ===
| # | Stadium | Capacity | City | Country | Type | Tenant(s) | Notes | Image |
|---|---|---|---|---|---|---|---|---|
| 1 | Bernabéu | 83,186 | Madrid | Spain | Retractable | Real Madrid (La Liga) | Retractable pitch as well; stadium was originally open-air | |
| 2 | Jakarta International Stadium | 82,000 | Jakarta | Indonesia | Retractable | Persija Jakarta (Liga 1), Indonesia national football team (AFC) | | |
| 3 | AT&T Stadium | 80,000 | Arlington, Texas | United States | Retractable | Dallas Cowboys (NFL) | Capacity expandable to 105,000. | |
| 4 | Principality Stadium | 73,931 | Cardiff | Wales | Retractable | Wales National Rugby Union Team (WRU) | | |
| 5 | Caesars Superdome | 73,208 | New Orleans, Louisiana | United States | Domed | New Orleans Saints (NFL) | Capacity expandable to 76,468 | |
| 6 | Reliant Stadium | 72,220 | Houston, Texas | United States | Retractable | Houston Texans (NFL) | | |
| 7 | Mercedes-Benz Stadium | 71,000 | Atlanta, Georgia | United States | Retractable | Atlanta Falcons (NFL), Atlanta United FC (MLS) | Expandable to 75,000 | |
| 8 | SoFi Stadium | 70,240 | Inglewood, California | United States | Skylight | Los Angeles Chargers, (NFL) Los Angeles Rams (NFL) | Expandable to 100,000 | |
| 9 | Al-Bayt Stadium | 68,895 | Al-Khor | Qatar | Retractable | Al-Khor SC | Seating capacity expected to be reduced to 32,600 after the 2022 World Cup. | |
| 10 | Gazprom Arena | 67,800 | St. Petersburg | Russia | Retractable | FC Zenit Saint Petersburg (Russian Premier League) | | |
| 11 | The Dome at America's Center | 67,277 | St. Louis, Missouri | United States | Domed | St. Louis BattleHawks (UFL) | Capacity expandable to 70,000 | |
| 12 | U.S. Bank Stadium | 66,860 | Minneapolis, Minnesota | United States | Skylight | Minnesota Vikings (NFL) | Capacity expandable to 73,000 | |
| 13 | Allegiant Stadium | 65,000 | Las Vegas, Nevada | United States | Skylight | Las Vegas Raiders (NFL), UNLV Rebels (NCAA) | Capacity expandable to 72,000 | |
| 14 | Ford Field | 65,000 | Detroit, Michigan | United States | Domed | Detroit Lions (NFL) | Capacity expandable to 70,000 | |
| 15 | Alamodome | 64,000 | San Antonio, Texas | United States | Domed | UTSA Roadrunners (NCAA) | Capacity expandable to 72,000 | |
| 16 | State Farm Stadium | 63,400 | Glendale, Arizona | United States | Retractable | Arizona Cardinals (NFL) | Seating capacity expandable to 72,200 (over 78,600 with standing room). | |
| 17 | Lucas Oil Stadium | 63,000 | Indianapolis, Indiana | United States | Retractable | Indianapolis Colts (NFL) | Capacity expandable to 70,000. | |
| 18 | Kazimierz Górski National Stadium | 58,580 | Warsaw | Poland | Retractable | Poland National Football Team (UEFA) | | |
| 19 | Johan Cruyff ArenA | 56,120 | Amsterdam | Netherlands | Retractable | AFC Ajax (Eredivisie) | | |
| 20 | Olympic Stadium | 56,040 | Montreal, Quebec | Canada | Domed | CF Montréal (MLS, select matches) | The stadium's roof replacement project is underway. | |
| 21 | Arena Națională | 55,634 | Bucharest | Romania | Retractable | Romania National Football Team (UEFA), FCSB (Liga I) | | |
| 22 | National Stadium | 55,000 | Singapore | Singapore | Retractable | Singapore National Football Team (AFC) | | |
| 23 | Veltins-Arena | 54,740 | Gelsenkirchen | Germany | Retractable | FC Schalke 04 (Bundesliga) | Capacity 62,271 with standing rows | |
| 24 | Merkur Spiel-Arena | 54,600 | Düsseldorf | Germany | Retractable | Fortuna Düsseldorf (Bundesliga) | | |
| 25 | BC Place | 54,320 | Vancouver, British Columbia | Canada | Retractable | BC Lions (CFL), Vancouver Whitecaps FC (MLS) | The stadium originally featured an air-supported roof, which was later replaced with a retractable roof. | |
| 26 | Deutsche Bank Park | 53,800 | Frankfurt | Germany | Retractable | Eintracht Frankfurt (Bundesliga) | The stadium originally was roofless, with a retractable roof later added to it. | |
| 27 | Marvel Stadium | 53,343 | Melbourne | Australia | Retractable | Essendon Football Club (AFL), St Kilda Football Club (AFL), Western Bulldogs (AFL), North Melbourne Football Club (AFL), Carlton Football Club (AFL), Melbourne Renegades (BBL), Melbourne Renegades (WBBL), Melbourne Victory FC (A-League) | | |
| 28 | Strawberry Arena | 50,653 | Solna | Sweden | Retractable | Sweden National Football Team (UEFA), AIK Fotboll (Allsvenskan) | | |
| 29 | Stade Pierre-Mauroy | 50,186 | Villeneuve d'Ascq | France | Retractable | Lille OSC (Ligue 1) | | |
| 30 | Kai Tak Sports Park Main Stadium | 50,000 | Hong Kong | Hong Kong | Retractable | Hong Kong national football team | | |
| 31 | JMA Wireless Dome | 49,057 | Syracuse, New York | United States | Domed | Syracuse Orange (NCAA) | The stadium originally featured an air-supported roof, which was later replaced by a fixed roof. | |
| 32 | Chase Field | 48,330 | Phoenix, Arizona | United States | Retractable | Arizona Diamondbacks (MLB) | | |
| 33 | T-Mobile Park | 47,929 | Seattle, Washington | United States | Retractable | Seattle Mariners (MLB) | | |
| 34 | Tokyo Dome | 45,600 | Tokyo | Japan | Domed | Yomiuri Giants (NPB) | Capacity expandable to 65,000. | |
| 35 | Toyota Stadium | 45,000 | Toyota | Japan | Retractable | Nagoya Grampus (J1 League), Toyota Verblitz (Top League) | | |
| 36 | Al Janoub Stadium | 44,325 | Al-Wakrah | Qatar | Retractable | Al-Wakrah Sports Club (Qatar Stars League) | Seating capacity expected to be reduced to 20,000 after the 2022 World Cup. | |
| 37 | Ligga Arena | 42,372 | Curitiba | Brazil | Retractable | Club Athletico Paranaense (Campeonato Brasileiro Série A) | The stadium originally was roofless, with a retractable roof later added to it. | |
| 38 | Tropicana Field | 42,735 | St. Petersburg, Florida | United States | Domed | Tampa Bay Rays (MLB) | Sections of seating are closed and covered with tarps, functionally bringing the seating capacity down to 31,042. | |
| 39 | American Family Field | 41,900 | Milwaukee, Wisconsin | United States | Retractable | Milwaukee Brewers (MLB) | | |
| 40 | Sapporo Dome | 41,566 | Sapporo | Japan | Domed | Hokkaido Consadole Sapporo (J1 League) | Capacity expandable to 53,796 | |
| 41 | Daikin Park | 41,168 | Houston, Texas | United States | Retractable | Houston Astros (MLB) | | |
| 42 | Taipei Dome | 40,575 | Taipei | Taiwan | Domed | None | Expandable capacity to 50,000 for concerts. | |
| 43 | Globe Life Field | 40,300 | Arlington, Texas | United States | Retractable | Texas Rangers (MLB) | | |
| 44 | Fukuoka PayPay Dome | 40,142 | Fukuoka | Japan | Retractable | Fukuoka SoftBank Hawks (NPB) | | |
| 45 | Resonac Dome Oita | 40,000 | Ōita | Japan | Retractable | Oita Trinita (J1 League) | | |
| 46 | Shaoxing China Textile City Sports Center | 40,000 | Shaoxing | China | Retractable | None | | |
| 47 | Rogers Centre | 39,150 | Toronto, Ontario | Canada | Retractable | Toronto Blue Jays (MLB) | | |
| 48 | Parken Stadium | 38,065 | Copenhagen | Denmark | Retractable | Denmark National Football Team (UEFA), F.C. Copenhagen (Superliga) | | |
| 49 | LoanDepot Park | 36,742 | Miami, Florida | United States | Retractable | Miami Marlins (MLB) | Capacity is 37,442 with standing room. | |
| 50 | Nagoya Dome | 36,418 | Nagoya | Japan | Domed | Chunichi Dragons (NPB) | | |
| 51 | Kyocera Dome | 36,220 | Osaka | Japan | Domed | Orix Buffaloes (NPB) | | |
| 52 | Ordos Stadium | 35,107 | Ordos | China | Retractable | None | | |
| 53 | ES CON Field Hokkaido | 35,000 | Kitahiroshima | Japan | Retractable | Hokkaido Nippon Ham Fighters (NPB) | | |
| 54 | Belluna Dome | 31,552 | Tokorozawa | Japan | Domed | Saitama Seibu Lions (NPB) | | |
| 55 | Forsyth Barr Stadium | 30,748 | Dunedin | New Zealand | Domed | Otago Rugby Football Union (NZR), Highlanders (Super Rugby) | Expandable seating capacity | |
| 56 | Paris La Défense Arena | 30,680 | Nanterre | France | Domed | Racing 92 (Top 14) | Stadium-arena hybrid. A movable seating structure allows it to house field sports and be configured as an arena. | |
| 57 | Noevir Stadium Kobe | 30,132 | Kobe | Japan | Retractable | Vissel Kobe (J1 League), INAC Kobe Leonessa (Nadeshiko League), Kobelco Steelers (Top League) | The stadium originally was roofless, with a retractable roof later added to it. | |
| 58 | Astana Arena | 30,244 | Astana | Kazakhstan | Retractable | FC Astana (Kazakhstan Premier League), FC Bayterek (Kazakhstan First Division), Kazakhstan National Football Team (UEFA) | | |
| 59 | 3Arena | 30,000 | Stockholm | Sweden | Retractable | Djurgårdens IF Fotboll (Allsvenskan), Hammarby Fotboll (Allsvenskan) | Capacity is 33,000 with standing room. | |
| 60 | GelreDome | 28,000 | Arnhem | Netherlands | Retractable | Vitesse Arnhem (Eredivisie) | | |
| 61 | Saitama Super Arena | 27,000 | Saitama | Japan | Domed | None | Stadium-arena hybrid. A movable seating structure allows it to house field sports and be configured as an arena. | |
| 62 | Kingdom Arena | 26,000 | Riyadh | Saudi Arabia | Retractable | Al Hilal SFC | Capacity Expandable to 40,000 seats | |
| 63 | Nantong Stadium | 22,000 | Nantong | China | Retractable | None | | |
| 64 | One New Zealand Stadium | 30,000 | Christchurch | New Zealand | Skylight | Crusaders (Super Rugby), Canterbury (NPC) | Expandable to 30-37,000 | |
| 65 | Fargodome | 18,700 | Fargo, North Dakota | United States | Domed | North Dakota State Bison (NCAA) | | |
| 66 | Tacoma Dome | 17,100 | Tacoma, Washington | United States | Domed | None | | |
| 67 | Gocheok Sky Dome | 16,739 | Seoul | South Korea | Domed | Kiwoom Heroes (KBO League) | | |
| 68 | UNI-Dome | 16,324 | Cedar Falls, Iowa | United States | Domed | Northern Iowa Panthers (NCAA) | | |
| 69 | Kibbie Dome | 16,000 | Moscow, Idaho | United States | Domed | Idaho Vandals (NCAA) | | |
| 70 | Telenor Arena | 15,000 | Bærum | Norway | Domed | None | | |
| 71 | Alerus Center | 12,283 | Grand Forks, North Dakota | United States | Domed | North Dakota Fighting Hawks (NCAA) | | |
| 72 | ICCU Dome | 12,000 | Pocatello, Idaho | United States | Domed | Idaho State Bengals (NCAA) | | |
| 73 | Ford Center at The Star | 12,000 | Frisco, Texas | United States | Domed | Dallas Cowboys (NFL), Dallas Rattlers (MLL) | Used for high school football by the Frisco Independent School District and serves as the Dallas Cowboys' practice facility. | |
| 74 | Walkup Skydome | 10,000 | Flagstaff, Arizona | United States | Domed | Northern Arizona Lumberjacks (NCAA) | Capacity expandable to 11,230 | |
| 75 | DakotaDome | 9,100 | Vermillion, South Dakota | United States | Domed | South Dakota Coyotes (NCAA) | | |
| 76 | ETSU/Mountain States Health Alliance Athletic Center | 8,539 | Johnson City, Tennessee | United States | Domed | None | | |
| 77 | Superior Dome | 8,000 | Marquette, Michigan | United States | Domed | Northern Michigan Wildcats (NCAA) | | |
| 78 | Round Valley Ensphere | 5,500 | Eagar, Arizona | United States | Domed | Round Valley High School (AIA) | | |
| 79 | Nipro Hachiko Dome | 5,040 | Odate | Japan | Domed | None | | |

=== Tennis and other ===
| # | Stadium | Capacity | City | Country | Type | Tenant(s) | Notes |
|---|---|---|---|---|---|---|---|
| 1 | Arthur Ashe Stadium | 23,771 | New York City, New York | United States | Retractable | US Open | Retractable-roofed tennis arena. Originally open-air. |
| 2 | Estadio Mary Terán de Weiss | 15,500 | Buenos Aires | Argentina | Retractable | Argentina (Davis Cup) | Retractable-roofed tennis arena. Originally open-air. |
| 3 | Stade Roland Garros – Court Philippe Chatrier | 15,225 | Paris | France | Retractable | French Open | Retractable-roofed tennis arena. Originally open-air. |
| 4 (tie) | Centre Court | 15,000 | London | United Kingdom | Retractable | Wimbledon | Originally an open-air stadium. |
| 4 (tie) | National Tennis Center Center Court | 15,000 | Beijing | China | Retractable | China Open | |
| 4 (tie) | Plaza de Toros La Macarena | 15,000 | Medellín | Colombia | Retractable | None | Retractable-roofed bullfighting arena. Originally open-air. |
| 4 (tie) | Qizhong Forest Sports City Arena | 15,000 | Shanghai | China | Retractable | Shanghai Masters | |
| 8 | Rod Laver Arena | 14,820 | Melbourne | Australia | Retractable | Australian Open | Multi-purpose arena with retractable roof, part of the National Tennis Centre at Melbourne Park (part of the Melbourne Sports and Entertainment Precinct) |
| 9 | Louis Armstrong Stadium | 14,000 | New York City, New York | United States | Retractable | US Open | Retractable-roofed tennis arena. |
| 10 | Perth Arena | 13,910 | Perth | Australia | Retractable | Perth Wildcats (NBL), West Coast Fever (Suncorp Super Netball) | |
| 11 | Tennisstadion am Rothenbaum | 13,200 | Hamburg | Germany | Retractable | Hamburg European Open | |
| 12 | Estadio Manolo Santana | 12,442 | Madrid | Spain | Retractable | Madrid Open | |
| 13 | No. 1 Court | 12,345 | London | United Kingdom | Retractable | Wimbledon | Originally an open-air stadium. |
| 14 | Gerry Weber Stadion | 12,300 | Halle (Westfalen) | Germany | Retractable | Halle Open | |
| 15 | Plaza de Toros de La Ribera | 11,046 | Logroño | Spain | Retractable | None | Retractable-roofed bullring. |
| 16 | Iradier Arena | 10,714 | Vitoria-Gasteiz | Spain | Retractable | None | Retractable-roofed arena |
| 17 | John Cain Arena | 10,500 | Melbourne | Australia | Retractable | Melbourne United (NBL), South East Melbourne Phoenix (NBL), Melbourne Vixens (Suncorp Super Netball), Collingwood Magpies (Suncorp Super Netball), Australian Open | Multi-purpose arena with retractable roof, part of the National Tennis Centre |
| 18 | Stade Roland Garros – Court Suzanne Lenglen | 10,068 | Paris | France | Retractable | French Open | Retractable-roofed tennis arena, originally open-air. |
| 19 | Ariake Coliseum | 10,000 | Koto, Tokyo | Japan | Retractable | Japan Open | |
| 20 | Margaret Court Arena | 7,500 | Melbourne | Australia | Retractable | Australian Open | Multi-purpose arena with retractable roof, part of the National Tennis Centre |
| 21 | Campo Pequeno bullring | 6,869 | Lisbon | Portugal | Retractable | None | Retractable-roofed bullfighting stadium. Originally was open-air. |
| 22 | Pat Rafter Arena | 5,500 | Tennyson, Queensland | Australia | Domed | Brisbane International | Expandable to 7,000 |
| 23 | Kungliga tennishallen | 5,000 | Stockholm | Sweden | Domed | Stockholm Open | |
| 24 | Caja Mágica Court 1 | 3,500 | Madrid | Spain | Retractable | Madrid Open | |
| 25 | Caja Mágica Court 2 | 2,500 | Madrid | Spain | Retractable | Madrid Open | |
| 26 | Aqua Wing Arena | 2,000 | Nagano | Japan | Retractable | None | Retractable-roofed aquatics stadium |

== Closed and demolished ==
=== Field sports ===
(All of these were domed)

==== Defunct and demolished stadiums ====
| # | Stadium | Capacity | City | Country | Closed | Demolished | Tenant(s) | Notes |
|---|---|---|---|---|---|---|---|---|
| 1 | Pontiac Silverdome | 82,000 | Pontiac, Michigan | United States | 2013 | December 4, 2017 | Detroit Lions (NFL) (1975-2001), Detroit Pistons (NBA) (1978-1988), Detroit Express (NASL) (1978-1980), Michigan Panthers (USFL) (1983-1984), Detroit Mechanix (AUDL) (2012) | |
| 2 | Georgia Dome | 71,228 | Atlanta, Georgia | United States | 2017 | November 20, 2017 | Atlanta Falcons (NFL) (1992-2016), Atlanta Hawks (NBA) (1997-1999), Georgia State Panthers (NCAA) (2010-2016) | Demolished after the opening of Mercedes-Benz Stadium. |
| 3 | Kingdome | 66,000 | Seattle, Washington | United States | 2000 | March 26, 2000 | Seattle Seahawks (NFL) (1976-1999), Seattle Sounders (NASL) (1976-1983), Seattle Mariners (MLB) (1977-1999), Seattle SuperSonics (NBA) (1978-1985) | The open-air Lumen Field stands on the site. |
| 4 | Hubert H. Humphrey Metrodome | 64,111 | Minneapolis, Minnesota | United States | 2013 | January 18, 2014 | Minnesota Vikings (NFL) (1982-2013), Minnesota Twins (MLB) (1982-2009), Minnesota Golden Gophers (NCAA) (1982-2008), Minnesota Strikers (NASL) (1984), Minnesota Timberwolves (NBA) (1989-1990) | A newer domed stadium, U.S. Bank Stadium, stands on the site. |
| 5 | NRG Astrodome | 62,439 | Houston, Texas | United States | 2004 | N/A | Houston Astros (MLB) (1965-1999), Houston Cougars (NCAA) (1965-1997), Houston Stars (USA/NASL) (1967-1968), Houston Oilers (AFL/NFL) (1968-1996), Houston Texans (WFL) (1974), Houston Hurricane (NASL) (1978-1980), Houston Gamblers (USFL) (1984-1985), Houston Energy (WPFL) (2002-2006) | Still standing (defunct) |
| 6 | RCA Dome | 57,981 | Indianapolis, Indiana | United States | 2008 | December 20, 2008 | Indianapolis Colts (NFL) (1984-2007) | Demolished after the opening of Lucas Oil Stadium. |
| 7 | Illichivets Indoor Sports Complex | 5,500 | Mariupol | Ukraine | April 2022 | N/A | FC Mariupol (UPL U-19) (2007-2022, winter games) | Still standing but badly damaged due to the Russian invasion of Ukraine. |

==== Formerly covered stadiums ====
| # | Stadium | Capacity (previous to removal of roof) | City | Country | Tenant(s) | Notes |
|---|---|---|---|---|---|---|
| 1 | Fisht Olympic Stadium | 40,000 | Sochi | Russia | PFC Sochi (Russian Premier League) | Roof was designed for the 2014 Winter Olympics opening and closing ceremonies and the 2014 Winter Paralympics opening and closing ceremonies as a temporary structure, and was removed as part of a renovation in preparation for the 2018 World Cup. |

== Future ==
=== Field sports ===
| Stadium | Capacity | City | Country | Type | Opening | Tenant(s) | Ref. |
|---|---|---|---|---|---|---|---|
| Hùng Vương Stadium | 135,000 | Hanoi | Vietnam | Retractable | 2028 | —N/a | |
| New Huntington Bank Field | 67,500 | Brook Park, Ohio | United States | Skylight | 2029 | Cleveland Browns | |
| New Stadium at RFK Campus | 65,000 | Washington, D.C. | United States | Skylight | 2030 | Washington Commanders | |
| EverBank Stadium | 62,000 | Jacksonville, Florida | United States | Skylight | 2028 | Jacksonville Jaguars | |
| Nissan Stadium | 60,000 | Nashville, Tennessee | United States | Skylight | 2027 | Tennessee Titans | |
| Bears Stadium | 60,000 | Arlington Heights, Illinois | United States | Skylight | 2029 | Chicago Bears | |
| Las Vegas Stadium | 33,000 | Paradise, Nevada | United States | Skylight | 2028 | Las Vegas Athletics | |
| Macquarie Point Stadium | 23,000 | Hobart, Tasmania | Australia | Skylight | 2029 | Tasmania Football Club | |
| Broncos Stadium | TBD | Denver, Colorado | United States | Retractable | 2031 | Denver Broncos | |
| New Tampa Bay Rays stadium | 31,000 | Tampa, Florida | United States | Skylight | 2029 | Tampa Bay Rays | |

=== Tennis ===
| Stadium | Capacity | City | Country | Type | Tenant(s) | Ref. |
|---|---|---|---|---|---|---|
| ASB Tennis Centre | 3,200 | Auckland | New Zealand | Retractable | ASB Classic | |

== See also ==
- List of stadiums by capacity
- List of world's largest domes
- Lists of stadiums
