= Joe Hughes (boxer) =

English boxer (born 1990)

Personal information
- Born: 6 August 1990 (age 35) Bath, Somerset, England
- Height: 5 ft 9 in (175 cm)
- Weight: Light welterweight

Boxing career
- Reach: 61.5 in (156 cm)
- Stance: Orthodox

Boxing record
- Total fights: 24
- Wins: 17
- Win by KO: 7
- Losses: 6
- Draws: 1

Joe Hughes (born 6 August 1990) is an English professional boxer who was born with Erb's palsy. He held the European light-welterweight title from 2018 to 2019 and challenged twice for the same title, along with two attempts at the British light-welterweight title between 2017 and 2019.

== Early life ==
Joe Hughes was born on 6 August 1990 in Bath, Somerset, and grew up in Malmesbury, Wiltshire. He developed Erb's palsy after dislocating his shoulder during birth, a condition which causes paralysis due to damaged nerves. Due to the condition, his right arm failed to develop properly and is three inches shorter than his left. Doctors told his parents that he would never be able to run in a straight line, have a manual job or participate in contact sports.

His introduction to combat sports came through taekwondo around the age of five. His father took him to lessons as an alternative to physiotherapy for his shoulder, with Hughes stating in an interview with BBC Sports, "Since I was born I had to do physiotherapy on it and obviously when you're a child you don't want to do those standard exercises, it's boring for a child." He first got into boxing three years later after his father took him to the Malmesbury Amateur Boxing Club at the age of eight.

== Professional career ==
=== Early career ===
Hughes made his professional debut on 16 October 2010, scoring a six-round points decision (PTS) victory over Jason Carr at the Troxy in London. After three more wins, two by stoppage, he suffered the first defeat of his career against Joe Elfidh in March 2012, losing by PTS over six rounds.

Following defeat he secured four more wins, one by stoppage, before facing Kristian Dochev for the vacant International Masters light-welterweight title on 5 April 2014, at The Forum in Bath. Hughes captured his first professional title, defeating Dochev via PTS over ten rounds. In his next fight he defeated future Commonwealth light-welterweight champion, Philip Bowes, on 11 October 2014, at The O2 Arena in London, capturing the vacant Southern Arena light-welterweight title with a technical knockout (TKO) in the tenth and final round. In his next bout he fought for a regional IBO title, defeating Jaba Shalutashvili on 18 April 2015, at the Whitchurch Sports Centre in Bristol, capturing the vacant IBO International light-welterweight title via eighth-round TKO.

=== English title ===
Following his win over Shalutashvili, Hughes was scheduled to face Ryan Taylor for the vacant English light-welterweight title. However, after Taylor suffered a stoppage defeat earlier in the month he was handed an automatic suspension, prompting Anthony Hardy to be drafted in as a replacement. The bout took place on 18 July 2015 at the Bath Pavilion in Bath, with Hughes emerging victorious via ten-round split decision (SD) to capture his fourth professional title in as many fights. Two judges scored the bout 98–92 in favour of Hughes while the third scored it 97–95 to Hardy. After a TKO win in a non-title fight against Tomas Bartunek in October, Hughes successfully defended his English title on 5 December, defeating Anthony Upton via ten-round unanimous decision (UD) at the Town Hall in Walsall.

After his win over Upton, Hughes relinquished his English title in favour of a final eliminator for the British light-welterweight title, challenging The Ring magazine's number nine ranked contender and WBO Inter-Continental light-welterweight champion Jack Catterall. The bout took place on 13 May 2016 at the Macron Stadium's Premier Suite in Bolton, with Hughes suffering the second defeat of his career, losing by UD with the judges' scorecards reading 117–112, 117–113, and 115–113.

Following the defeat to Catterall, Hughes was installed as the mandatory challenger for the English title that he relinquished prior to the Catterall fight, which was then held by former victim Anthony Upton. Upton elected to relinquish the title instead of fighting Hughes, leaving Hughes to face Andy Keates for the vacant title on 17 December 2016 at Action Indoor Sports in Bristol. Hughes regained the English title via UD, with the judges' scorecards reading 100–92, 98–94, and 97–94.

=== British title attempt ===
For his next fight he once again vacated his English title in order to challenge British light-welterweight champion, Tyrone Nurse, on 23 April 2017 at the Leicester Arena. In what was viewed as a surprise result, Hughes fought to a twelve-round split draw. One judge scored the bout 115–113 in favour of Hughes, another scored it 116–113 for Nurse while the third judge scored it even at 115–115 to see Nurse retain the British title.

=== European title ===
He returned to the Leicester Arena for his next fight, challenging European light-welterweight champion, Anthony Yigit, on 2 December. In a fight that saw Hughes start as the aggressor, he eventually slowed down as he began to tire, going on to suffer his third professional defeat with a UD loss. The judges' scorecards read 118–112, 118–110, and 119–109. After securing a stoppage victory by corner retirement (RTD) against Ruben Rodriguez in February 2018, Hughes was handed a second shot at the European title, this time against Andrea Scarpa for the vacant title on 30 November 2018 at the Teatro Obi Hall in Florence, Italy. Hughes captured his first major regional title via SD, with two judges scoring the bout 118–110 and 116–112 in favour of Hughes while the third judge scored it 116–112 to Scarpa.

He would make a second attempt at the British title in a unification fight against reigning champion Robbie Davies Jr. on 30 March 2019 at the Echo Arena in Liverpool. Hughes lost his European title by UD, with the judges' scorecards reading 115–114, 115–113, and 118–110.

=== Cancelled bout with Ritson ===
He was scheduled to make his comeback on 2 August against former British lightweight champion and reigning WBA Continental light-welterweight champion Lewis Ritson at the Liverpool Exhibition Centre. However, in the week leading up to the fight Hughes was forced to withdraw after a back injury.

=== Third European title attempt ===
After recovering from his back injury, Hughes got the chance to become a two-time European champion, challenging reigning champion Sandor Martin on 12 December 2019 at the Pabellón de la Vall d'Hebron in Barcelona, Spain. Hughes was unsuccessful in his attempt, losing by a wide UD margin with two judges' scoring the bout 119–108 and the third scoring it 117–111.

== Professional boxing record ==
24 fights	17 wins	6 losses
By knockout	7	0
By decision	10	6
Draws	1	

No.	Result	Record	Opponent	Type	Round, time	Date	Location	Notes
24	Loss	17–6–1	Sam Maxwell	UD	10	29 Aug 2020	BT Sport Studio, London, England	For WBO European light-welterweight title
23	Loss	17–5–1	Sandor Martin	UD	12	12 Dec 2019	Pabellón de la Vall d'Hebron, Barcelona, Spain	For European light-welterweight title
22	Loss	17–4–1	Robbie Davies Jr.	UD	12	30 Mar 2019	Echo Arena, Liverpool, England	Lost European light-welterweight title; For British light-welterweight title
21	Win	17–3–1	Andrea Scarpa	SD	12	30 Nov 2018	Teatro Obi Hall, Florence, Italy	Won vacant European light-welterweight title
20	Win	16–3–1	Ruben Rodriguez	RTD	6 (8), 3:00	9 Feb 2018	UWE Exhibition and Conference Centre, Bristol, England	
19	Loss	15–3–1	Anthony Yigit	UD	12	2 Dec 2017	Leicester Arena, Leicester, England	For European light-welterweight title
18	Draw	15–2–1	Tyrone Nurse	SD	12	22 Apr 2017	Leicester Arena, Leicester, England	For British light-welterweight title
17	Win	15–2	Andy Keates	UD	10	17 Dec 2016	Action Indoor Sports, Bristol, England	Won vacant English light-welterweight title
16	Loss	14–2	Jack Catterall	UD	12	13 May 2016	Macron Stadium's Premier Suite, Bolton, England	For WBO Inter-Continental light-welterweight title
15	Win	14–1	Anthony Upton	UD	10	5 Dec 2015	Walsall Town Hall, Walsall, England	Retained English light-welterweight title
14	Win	13–1	Tomas Bartunek	TKO	1 (8), 3:00	24 Oct 2015	Oasis Leisure Centre, Swindon, England	
13	Win	12–1	Anthony Hardy	SD	10	18 Jul 2015	Bath Pavilion, Bath, England	Won vacant English light-welterweight title
12	Win	11–1	Jaba Shalutashvili	TKO	8 (10), 1:49	18 Apr 2015	Whitchurch Sports Centre, Bristol, England	Won vacant IBO International light-welterweight title
11	Win	10–1	Philip Bowes	TKO	10 (10), 2:05	11 Oct 2014	The O2 Arena, London, England	Won vacant Southern Area light-welterweight title
10	Win	9–1	Kristian Dochev	PTS	10	5 Apr 2014	The Forum, Bath, England	Won vacant International Masters light-welterweight title
9	Win	8–1	Dougie Curran	PTS	6	7 Dec 2013	Oasis Leisure Centre, Swindon, England	
8	Win	7–1	William Warburton	PTS	6	26 Oct 2013	Trowbridge Civic Hall, Trowbridge, England	
7	Win	6–1	Mark McKray	PTS	6	6 Oct 2012	Oasis Leisure Centre, Swindon, England	
6	Win	5–1	Matt Seawright	RTD	2 (6), 3:00	2 Jun 2012	GL1 Leisure Centre, Gloucester, England	
5	Loss	4–1	Joe Elfidh	PTS	6	3 Mar 2012	Hillsborough Leisure Centre, Sheffield, England	
4	Win	4–0	Tony Pace	PTS	6	3 Sep 2011	Dome Leisure Centre, Doncaster, England	
3	Win	3–0	Martin Shaw	TKO	6 (6), 1:39	9 Apr 2011	Rainton Meadows Arena, Houghton-le-Spring, England	
2	Win	2–0	Gavin Putney	TKO	1 (6)	5 Feb 2011	Brentwood Centre, Brentwood, England	
1	Win	1–0	Jason Carr	PTS	6	16 Oct 2010	Troxy, London, England	

Sporting positions
Regional boxing titles
Vacant Title last held by Ricky Boylan	Southern Area light-welterweight champion 11 October 2014 – March 2015	Vacant Title next held by Johnny Coyle
Vacant Title last held by Lee McAllister	IBO International light-welterweight champion 18 April 2015 – June 2015	Vacant Title next held by Batyrzhan Jukembayev
Vacant Title last held by Tommy Martin	English light-welterweight champion 18 July 2015 – April 2016	Vacant Title next held by Anthony Upton
Vacant Title last held by Anthony Upton	English light-welterweight champion 17 December 2016 – March 2017	Vacant Title next held by Glenn Foot
Vacant Title last held by Anthony Yigit	European light-welterweight champion 30 November 2018 – 30 March 2019	Succeeded by Robbie Davies Jr.
