= Estadio Heliodoro Rodríguez López =

Association football stadium in Canary Islands, Spain

Heliodoro Rodríguez López Estadio de Tenerife
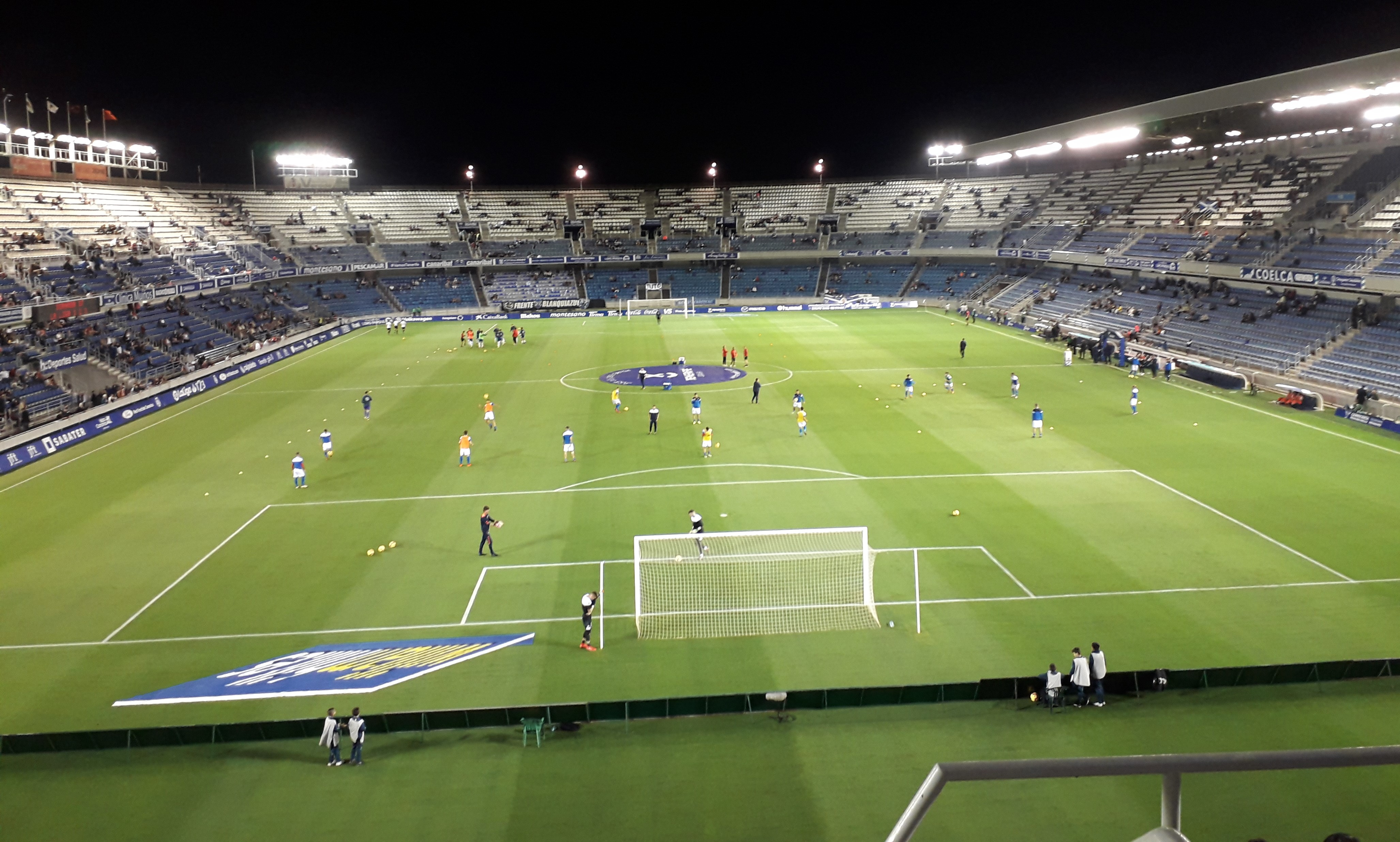
- Interactive map of Heliodoro Rodríguez López; Estadio de Tenerife
- Location: Santa Cruz de Tenerife, Spain
- Coordinates: 28°27′47″N 16°15′38″W
- Owner: Cabildo Insular de Tenerife
- Operator: Cabildo Insular de Tenerife
- Capacity: 22,824
- Field size: 105 metres (115 yd) x 68 metres (74 yd)

Construction
- Opened: 25 July 1925 (inauguration)
- Renovated: 1940s-1950s and 1990s-2000s
- Architects: Marrero Regalado; Carlos deh Schwartz

Tenants
- CD Tenerife; UD Tenerife (2025-); Spain national football team (selected matches)

Estadio Heliodoro Rodriguez Lopez also Estadio de Tenerife is a football stadium in Santa Cruz de Tenerife, Tenerife, Canary Islands, Spain. It is the home ground of CD Tenerife. With a capacity of 22,824 seats, it is the 27th-largest stadium in Spain and the second-largest in the Canary Islands. It has dimensions of 107 x 70 metres, making it the stadium with the largest playing area in the Canary Islands.

== History ==
The stadium was inaugurated on July 25, 1925 with the game between Tenerife and Marino from Las Palmas.

The plant was designed by the architects José Enrique Marrero Regalado and Carlos Schwartz. The dimensions of the soccer field are 107x70m and it has a capacity of 22,948 spectators, which makes it the stadium with the largest playing surface in the archipelago. The original name of the field was "Stadium" and it was changed to the current one in 1950.

The stadium was renovated in 1949 and 2000 following as models the Mini Estadi and the Alberto Jacinto Armando Stadium. In the first half of the 90s it was also used for matches of the Spanish team.

In June 2026, Tenerife announced plans to redevelop the stadium which would include installing new seats, upgrading the roof, installing two new large video boards, creating a new exterior that would wrap around the stadium, expanding capacity to 25,000, and upgrading the surrounding area.

== International matches ==
=== Spain national team matches ===
Date	Opponent	Score	Competition
13 December 1989	Switzerland	2–1	Friendly match
9 February 1994	Poland	1–1	Friendly match
13 November 1996	Slovakia	4–1	1998 FIFA World Cup qualification
18 November 2024	Switzerland	3–2	UEFA Nations League

== See also ==
- Club Deportivo Tenerife
