= Sandor Martín =

Spanish boxer (born 1993)

Personal information
- Nickname: Arrasandor
- Born: 22 August 1993 (age 33) Barcelona, Catalonia, Spain
- Height: 171 cm (5 ft 7 in)
- Weight: Light-welterweight

Boxing career
- Reach: 175 cm (69 in)
- Stance: Southpaw

Boxing record
- Total fights: 47
- Wins: 43
- Win by KO: 15
- Losses: 4

Sandor Martín Clemente (born 22 August 1993) is a Spanish professional boxer who has held the European super-lightweight title since 2019. As of October 2021, he is ranked as the world's sixth-best active super-lightweight by BoxRec, and eighth by the Transnational Boxing Rankings Board.

== Professional career ==
Martín made his professional debut on 8 October 2011, scoring a third-round technical knockout (TKO) victory over Armen Hovsepyan at the Pabellón del Bon Pastor in Barcelona, Spain.

After compiling a record of 34–2 (12 KOs) he faced Andrea Scarpa for the vacant European super-lightweight title on 27 July 2019 at the Pabellón Francisco Calvo in Barcelona. Martín captured the European title by stoppage via ninth-round corner retirement (RTD). At the time of the stoppage he was ahead on all three judges' scorecards at 90–81.

Martín went on to defend his title twice before taking on former four-division world champion Mikey Garcia on 16 October 2021 in Fresno, California. Despite being a big underdog, Martín upset the odds by prevailing as the victor by majority decision, with scores of 95–95, and 97–93 twice in his favor.

=== WBC super lightweight championship ===
==== Martín vs. Puello ====
Martín was scheduled to challenge Alberto Puello for his WBC super lightweight title on March 1, 2025 at Barclays Center in Brooklyn, NY. Martín loss the fight by split decision.

== Professional boxing record ==
47 fights	43 wins	4 losses
By knockout	15	0
By decision	28	4

No.	Result	Record	Opponent	Type	Round, time	Date	Location	Notes
47	Win	43–4	Yanis Kurylenko	UD	8	20 Dec 2025	Bilbao Arena, Bilbao, Spain	
46	Loss	42–4	Alberto Puello	SD	12	1 Mar 2025	Barclays Center, New York City, New York, US	For WBC super lightweight title
45	Win	42–3	Mohamed El Marcouchi	KO	4 (8), 2:00	16 Dec 2023	Palasport Le Cupole, Turin, Italy	
44	Win	41–3	Arblin Kaba	KO	6 (8), 1:17	15 Jul 2023	Teatro Maggiore, Verbania, Italy	
43	Loss	40–3	Teófimo López	SD	10	10 Dec 2022	Madison Square Garden, New York City, New York, US	For WBO International super-lightweight titles
42	Win	40–2	José Félix Jr.	UD	10	1 Apr 2022	Palau Olímpic Vall d'Hebron, Barcelona, Spain	Won vacant WBA International super-lightweight title
41	Win	39–2	Mikey Garcia	MD	10	16 Oct 2021	Chukchansi Park, Fresno, California, US	
40	Win	38–2	Kay Prosper	UD	12	23 Apr 2021	Pabellón de la Vall d'Hebron, Barcelona, Spain	Retained European super-lightweight title
39	Win	37–2	Nestor Maradiaga	UD	8	17 Dec 2020	Allianz Cloud, Milan, Italy	
38	Win	36–2	Joe Hughes	UD	12	12 Dec 2019	Pabellón de la Vall d'Hebron, Barcelona, Spain	Retained European super-lightweight title
37	Win	35–2	Andrea Scarpa	RTD	9 (12), 3:00	27 Jul 2019	Pabellón Francisco Calvo, Barcelona, Spain	Won vacant European super-lightweight title
36	Win	34–2	Sandro Hernandez	UD	8	22 Mar 2019	Casino Gran Madrid, Torrelodones, Spain	
35	Win	33–2	Mauro Maximiliano Godoy	UD	10	24 Nov 2018	Centro Comercial Las Arenas, Barcelona, Spain	
34	Win	32–2	Jorge Moreno	KO	4 (8)	23 Jun 2018	Hotel Novotel Madrid Center, Madrid, Spain	
33	Win	31–2	Gallus Coulon	UD	8	2 Jun 2018	Expocoruna, A Coruña, Spain	
32	Win	30–2	Adam Mate	KO	1 (8)	16 Dec 2017	La Cubierta, Leganés, Spain	
31	Loss	29–2	Anthony Yigit	UD	12	30 Sep 2017	Solnahallen, Solna, Sweden	For European super-lightweight title
30	Win	29–1	Chaquib Fadli	TKO	4 (8)	10 Jun 2017	Palau Olímpic Vall d'Hebron, Barcelona, Spain	
29	Win	28–1	Valentyn Golovko	UD	8	12 Nov 2016	Bilbao Exhibition Centre, Barakaldo, Spain	
28	Win	27–1	Ivans Levickis	PTS	6	4 Jun 2016	Frontón Bizkaia, Bilbao, Spain	
27	Win	26–1	Steve Jamoye	UD	10	1 Apr 2016	Pabellón del la Vall d'Hebron, Barcelona, Spain	
26	Win	25–1	György Mizsei	TKO	4 (12)	15 Nov 2015	Pabellón del Bon Pastor, Barcelona, Spain	Retained European Union super-lightweight title; Won vacant WBC Youth Silver super-lightweight title
25	Win	24–1	Ryan Peleguer	UD	6	10 Oct 2015	Pabellón Municipal de Deportes La Casilla, Bilbao, Spain	
24	Win	23–1	Anzor Gamgebeli	TKO	1 (6), 2:25	17 Jul 2015	Frontón Beti-Alai, Ordizia, Spain	
23	Win	22–1	Samuele Esposito	UD	12	19 Apr 2015	Pabellón del Bon Pastor, Barcelona, Spain	Won vacant European Union super-lightweight title
22	Win	21–1	Renald Garrido	PTS	8	12 Dec 2014	Palau Olímpic Vall d'Hebron, Barcelona, Spain	
21	Win	20–1	Miguel Aguilar	UD	6	24 Oct 2014	La Farga, L'Hospitalet de Llobregat, Spain	
20	Win	19–1	Mikhail Avakian	UD	10	21 Jun 2014	Pabellón del Bon Pastor, Barcelona, Spain	
19	Win	18–1	Maurycy Gojko	TKO	3 (6)	16 May 2014	Palau de Congressos de Catalunya, Barcelona, Spain	
18	Win	17–1	Ignacio Mendoza	TD	9 (10)	29 Mar 2014	Pabellón del Bon Pastor, Barcelona, Spain	Retained Spanish super-lightweight title; Unanimous TD after Sandor was cut from an accidental head clash
17	Win	16–1	Ubiraci Borges dos Santos	UD	6	15 Feb 2014	León, Spain	
16	Loss	15–1	Alexandre Lepelley	PTS	8	14 Dec 2013	Palau Olímpic Vall d'Hebron, Barcelona, Spain	
15	Win	15–0	Jose Antonio Elizabeth	TKO	2 (6)	19 Jul 2013	Odizia, Spain	
14	Win	14–0	Daniel Rasilla	UD	10	6 Jul 2013	Pabellón del Bon Pastor, Barcelona, Spain	Won vacant Spanish super-lightweight title
13	Win	13–0	Santos Medrano	UD	6	19 May 2013	Pabellón Municipal de Deportes, Manlleu, Spain	
12	Win	12–0	Juan Zapata	KO	2 (6), 1:12	1 Mar 2013	La Farga, L'Hospitalet de Llobregat, Spain	
11	Win	11–0	Antonio Joao Bento	UD	6	26 Jan 2013	Pabellón del Bon Pastor, Barcelona, Spain	
10	Win	10–0	Andoni Alonso	KO	3 (6)	15 Dec 2012	Polideportivo Municipal del Centro, Viladecans, Spain	
9	Win	9–0	Victor Segura	UD	6	30 Nov 2012	Hotel Fira Congress, L'Hospitalet decLlobregat, Spain	
8	Win	8–0	Alejandro Heredia	UD	6	5 Oct 2012	Cotxeres de Sants, Barcelona, Spain	
7	Win	7–0	Jose de Jesus Lopez	UD	6	20 Jul 2012	Frontón Beti-Alai, Ordizia, Spain	
6	Win	6–0	Jesus Garcia Simon	UD	6	6 Jul 2012	Palau de Congressos de Catalunya, Barcelona, Spain	
5	Win	5–0	Mauro Orlandi	TKO	1 (6)	5 May 2012	Pabellón del Bon Pastor, Barcelona, Spain	
4	Win	4–0	Sezer Erunsal	UD	6	16 Mar 2012	La Fargo, L'Hospitalet de Llobregat, Spain	
3	Win	3–0	Bruno Matarese	KO	2 (4), 1:04	5 Feb 2012	Pabellón del Bon Pastor, Barcelona, Spain	
2	Win	2–0	David Donis	UD	4	26 Nov 2011	Pabellón Pare Manyanet, Reus, Spain	
1	Win	1–0	Armen Hovsepyan	TKO	3 (4), 2:47	8 Oct 2011	Pabellón del Bon Pastor, Barcelona, Spain	

== La velada del año ==
Sandor has collaborated in every single edition of "La velada del año", an annual boxing show created by the youtuber and streamer Ibai Llanos since 2021 to nowadays in which different youtubers and streamers of Spain and latin America have taken part. He trained to reven for the first edition and the he took part in the organization for the technical part in the rest of editions. This event has reached up to 3.8 simultaneous spectators in twitch in the 4th edition.

Sporting positions
Regional boxing titles
Vacant Title last held by Ruben Nieto	Spanish super-lightweight champion 6 July 2013 – May 2014	Vacant Title next held by Ignacio Mendoza
Vacant Title last held by Lenny Daws	EBU European Union super-lightweight champion 19 April 2015 – 2016	Vacant Title next held by Franck Petitjean
Vacant Title last held by Robbie Davies Jr.	European super-lightweight champion 27 July 2019 – present	Incumbent
Minor world boxing titles
Vacant Title last held by Junior Ramirez	WBC Youth super-lightweight champion Silver title 15 November 2015 – 2016	Vacant Title next held by José Miguel Borrego
