= Philip Bowes =

English boxer (born 1984)

Personal information
- Nickname: Quicksilver
- Born: 12 June 1984 (age 42) London, England
- Height: 5 ft 11 in (180 cm)
- Weight: Light-welterweight; Welterweight

Boxing career
- Stance: Southpaw

Boxing record
- Total fights: 24
- Wins: 20
- Win by KO: 3
- Losses: 4

Philip Bowes (born 12 June 1984) is an English professional boxer. He held the Commonwealth super-lightweight title from 2019 to 2020 and challenged for the British super-lightweight title in 2020.

== Professional career ==
Bowes made his professional debut on 8 October 2011, scoring a four-round points decision (PTS) over Billy Smith at the York Hall in London.

After compiling a record of 9–0 (2 KO), he faced Joe Hughes for the vacant Southern Area super-lightweight title on 11 October 2014 at the O2 Arena, London, losing via technical knockout (TKO) in the tenth and final round. He made a second attempt for the vacant Southern Area title seven months later on 16 May 2015 at the York Hall, losing by points decision to former Prizefighter champion Johnny Coyle.

Following six consecutive PTS wins, he then faced Glenn Foot on 27 May 2017 for the vacant English super-lightweight title at the York Hall. Bowes lost in his third attempt for a British regional title via unanimous decision (UD) over ten rounds, with all three judges scoring the bout 95–93.

Following three points decision wins, he fought Benson Nyilawila on 2 February 2019 for the vacant Commonwealth super-lightweight title at the York Hall. In his fourth attempt at a professional title, Bowes won with a second-round TKO.

The first defence of his Commonwealth title came a month later on 30 March, against Tom Farrell at the M&S Bank Arena (formerly Echo Arena) in Liverpool. The fight was aired live on Sky Sports in the UK and DAZN in the United States as part of the undercard for Liam Smith vs. Sam Eggington. Bowes successfully retained his title by unanimous decision, with the judges' scorecards reading 118–110, 118–111 and 117–112.

Bowes was set to make the second defence of his Commonwealth title against Akeem Ennis-Brown on 29 November 2019 at the York Hall, with the vacant British super-lightweight title also on the line. The day before the fight, it was announced the bout had been cancelled due to the British Boxing Board of Control declaring Bowes medically unfit to fight. Bowes explained on social media; "...the doctor and Boxing Board of Control have ordered my British title fight tonight to be rescheduled due to me having blood in my urine which has come back as a result that I can not fight now. My health is most important so that’s my priority." The fight was then rescheduled for 20 March 2020, but was cancelled again, this time due to the COVID-19 pandemic. It eventually took place at Production Park Studios in South Kirkby on 2 September 2020, with Ennis-Brown winning via unanimous decision.

== Professional boxing record ==
24 fights	20 wins	4 losses
By knockout	3	1
By decision	17	3

No.	Result	Record	Opponent	Type	Round, time	Date	Location	Notes
24	Loss	20–4	Akeem Ennis-Brown	UD	12	2 Sep 2020	Production Park Studios, South Kirkby, England	Lost Commonwealth super-lightweight title; For vacant British super-lightweight title
23	Win	20–3	Tom Farrell	UD	12	30 Mar 2019	M&S Bank Arena, Liverpool, England	Retained Commonwealth super-lightweight title
22	Win	19–3	Benson Nyilawila	TKO	2 (12), 1:17	2 Feb 2019	York Hall, London, England	Won vacant Commonwealth super-lightweight title
21	Win	18–3	Radoslav Mitev	PTS	4	6 Oct 2018	York Hall, London, England	
20	Win	17–3	Vusumzi Tyatyeka	PTS	10	10 Feb 2018	York Hall, London, England	
19	Win	16–3	Luka Leskovic	PTS	6	14 Oct 2017	York Hall, London, England	
18	Loss	15–3	Glenn Foot	UD	10	27 May 2017	York Hall, London, England	For vacant English super-lightweight title
17	Win	15–2	Nathan Dale	PTS	10	25 Nov 2016	The Halls, Norwich, England	
16	Win	14–2	Daniel Bazo	PTS	6	1 Oct 2016	York Hall, London, England	
15	Win	13–2	James Gorman	PTS	6	4 Jun 2016	York Hall, London, England	
14	Win	12–2	Ivica Gogosevic	PTS	6	16 Apr 2016	York Hall, London, England	
13	Win	11–2	Fonz Alexander	PTS	6	27 Feb 2016	York Hall, London, England	
12	Win	10–2	Lee Connelly	PTS	4	4 Dec 2015	Camden Centre, London, England	
11	Loss	9–2	Johnny Coyle	PTS	10	16 May 2015	York Hall, London, England	For vacant Southern Area super-lightweight title
10	Loss	9–1	Joe Hughes	TKO	10 (10), 2:05	11 Oct 2014	O2 Arena, London, England	For vacant Southern Area super-lightweight title
9	Win	9–0	Francis Maina	PTS	10	17 May 2014	York Hall, London, England	
8	Win	8–0	Dean Mills	TKO	3 (8), 1:37	22 Mar 2014	York Hall, London, England	
7	Win	7–0	Paul Appleby	PTS	6	7 Dec 2013	York Hall, London, England	
6	Win	6–0	Andrei Sudas	TKO	6 (6), 1:57	9 Mar 2013	York Hall, London, England	
5	Win	5–0	Stanislav Nenko	PTS	4	8 Dec 2012	Brentwood Centre, Brentwood, England	
4	Win	4–0	Dave O'Connor	PTS	6	15 Sep 2012	York Hall, London, England	
3	Win	3–0	Mark McKray	PTS	4	26 May 2012	Brentwood Centre, Brentwood, England	
2	Win	2–0	Johnny Greaves	PTS	4	3 Dec 2011	York Hall, London, England	
1	Win	1–0	Billy Smith	PTS	4	8 Oct 2011	York Hall, London, England	
