= Boxing at the 2014 Commonwealth Games – Light welterweight =

Boxing competitions

Boxing – Light welterweight at the 2014 Commonwealth Games
- Venue: Scottish Exhibition and Conference Centre
- Dates: 26 July – 2 August 2014
- Competitors: 29 from 29 nations

Medalists
gold medal	Josh Taylor	Scotland
silver medal	Jonas Junias	Namibia
bronze medal	Samuel Maxwell	England
bronze medal	Sean Duffy	Northern Ireland

The Light welterweight boxing competition at the 2014 Commonwealth Games in Glasgow, Scotland took place between 26 July and 2 August at the Scottish Exhibition and Conference Centre.

Like all Commonwealth boxing events, the competition was a straight single-elimination tournament. Both semifinal losers were awarded bronze medals, so no boxers competed again after their first loss. Bouts consisted of three rounds of three minutes each, with one-minute breaks between rounds. Punches scored only if the front of the glove made full contact with the front of the head or torso of the opponent. Five judges scored each bout; three of the judges had to signal a scoring punch within one second for the punch to score. The winner of the bout was the boxer who scored the most valid punches by the end of the bout.

== Schedule ==
All times are British Summer Time (UTC+1)

Date	Time	Round
Saturday 26 July 2014	13:00 & 18:45	Round of 32
Sunday 27 July 2014	13:40 & 19:10	Round of 16
Tuesday 29 July 2014	13:55	Quarter-finals
Friday 1 August 2014	13:20	Semi-finals
Saturday 2 August 2014	14:20	Final

== Medalists ==
Gold	Josh Taylor; Scotland
Silver	Jonas Junias; Namibia
Bronze	Samuel Maxwell; England
Bronze	Sean Duffy; Northern Ireland

== Results ==
Round of 32
Ikani Falekaono (TON)	0
Samuel Maxwell (ENG)	KO2
Mokhachane Moshoeshoe (LES)	0
Manoj Kumar (IND)	3
Arthur Biyarslanov (CAN)	2
Musah Lawson (GHA)	1
Toaua Bangke (KIR)	0
Waheed Shogbamu (NGR)	3
Thabiso Dlamini (SWZ)	0
Zack Davies (WAL)	3
Kagiso Bagwasi (BOT)	0
Josh Taylor (SCO)	3
Lyndel Marcellin (LCA)	0
Richarno Colin (MRI)	3
Noel Eko (PNG)	0
Khir Azmi (MAS)	3
Sean Duffy (NIR)	3
Dilshan Mohamed (SRI)	0
Steven Thanki (MAW)	0
Fabiani Pius (TAN)	3
Charles Lumbwe (ZAM)	2
Bernado Marrime (MOZ)	1
Aamir Khan (PAK)	0
Jonas Junias (NAM)	3
Leroy Hindley (NZL)	2
Mohammed Al Amin (BAN)	0

Round of 16
Denis Okoth (KEN)	0
Samuel Maxwell (ENG)	3
Manoj Kumar (IND)	2
Arthur Biyarslanov (CAN)	1
Waheed Shogbamu (NGR)	0
Zack Davies (WAL)	3
Josh Taylor (SCO)	3
Richarno Colin (MRI)	0
Ploutarchos Parris (CYP)	0
Khir Azmi (MAS)	3
Sean Duffy (NIR)	2
Fabiani Pius (TAN)	1
Charles Lumbwe (ZAM)	0
Jonas Junias (NAM)	3
Leroy Hindley (NZL)	TKO
Rashield Williams (BAH)

Quarterfinals
Samuel Maxwell (ENG)	3
Manoj Kumar (IND)	0
Zack Davies (WAL)	0
Josh Taylor (SCO)	3
Khir Azmi (MAS)	0
Sean Duffy (NIR)	3
Jonas Junias (NAM)	3
Leroy Hindley (NZL)	0

Semifinals
Samuel Maxwell (ENG)	0
Josh Taylor (SCO)	3
Sean Duffy (NIR)	0
Jonas Junias (NAM)	3

Final
Josh Taylor (SCO)	3
Jonas Junias (NAM)	0
