= Robbie Davies Jr. =

British boxer

Personal information
- Nationality: British
- Born: 3 October 1989 (age 37) Liverpool, England
- Weight: Light welterweight

Boxing career
- Stance: Orthodox

Boxing record
- Total fights: 30
- Wins: 24
- Win by KO: 15
- Losses: 6

Robbie Davies Jr. (born 3 October 1989) is a British professional boxer and worked at Progress Schools and made his professional debut on 7 June 2013 at the Liverpool Olympia, forcing Carl Allen to retire from the bout in the first round. His second professional fight also ended in a first round victory after the referee stopped the bout, Davies having downed his opponent, Josh Thorne, three times.

In early 2016 it was announced that Davies would face Jarkko Putkonen for the vacant WBA Continental light-welterweight title, at the Devonshire House Hotel in Liverpool, on 5 March 2016. Davies won the title after stopping Putkonen in the sixth round with a right to the body. After two successful defences of the title, first against Xavier Luques Castillo, and then against Zoltan Szabo, Davies lost the title in his first professional loss against Michal Syrowatka on 15 July 2017, at the Wembley Arena, Davies knocked out in the twelfth round. Davies regained the title in a rematch against Syrowatka on 31 March 2018 at the ACC in Liverpool, the referee ending the bout in the twelfth round after Syrowatka had been downed three times.

On 13 October 2018, Davies faced Glenn Foot for the Commonwealth and vacant British light-welterweight titles, at the Metro Radio Arena in Newcastle. Davies beat Glenn on points despite suffering a cut above his left eye in the third round.

On 30 March 2019, Davies won the European light-welterweight title after defeating Joe Hughes on points, at the Echo Arena in Liverpool.

== Professional boxing record ==
30 fights	24 wins	6 losses
By knockout	15	3
By decision	9	3

No.	Result	Record	Opponent	Type	Round, time	Date	Location	Notes
30	Loss	24–6	Pat McCormack	RTD	6 (10)	15 Feb 2025	Co-op Live Arena, Manchester, England	
29	Win	24–5	Javier Fortuna	PTS	10	1 Nov 2024	SSE Arena, Belfast, Northern Ireland	
28	Loss	23–5	Sergey Lipinets	UD	10	8 May 2024	ProBox TV Events Center, Plant City, Florida, USA	
27	Loss	23–4	Darragh Foley	TKO	3 (10), 0:26	11 Mar 2023	Echo Arena, Liverpool, England	
26	Win	23–3	Javier Molina	SD	10	21 May 2022	O2 Arena, London, England	
25	Win	22–3	Hank Lundy	KO	2 (10), 2:33	11 Dec 2021	Echo Arena, Liverpool, England	
24	Win	21–3	Jonny Phillips	TKO	4 (6), 2:30	9 Oct 2021	Echo Arena, Liverpool, England	
23	Loss	20–3	Gabriel Valenzuela	MD	10	20 Feb 2021	The SSE Arena, London, England	For vacant IBF Intercontinental light-welterweight title
22	Win	20–2	Damien Leonardo Yapur	PTS	8	7 Mar 2020	Manchester Arena, Manchester, England	
21	Loss	19–2	Lewis Ritson	UD	12	19 Oct 2019	Utilita Arena, Newcastle, England	
20	Win	19–1	Michal Dufek	TKO	3 (8), 2:45	2 Aug 2019	Exhibition Centre, Liverpool, England	
19	Win	18–1	Joe Hughes	UD	12	30 Mar 2019	Echo Arena, Liverpool, England	Retained British light-welterweight title; Won European light-welterweight title
18	Win	17–1	Glenn Foot	UD	12	13 Oct 2018	Metro Radio Arena, Newcastle, England	Won Commonwealth and vacant British light-welterweight titles
17	Win	16–1	Michal Syrowatka	TKO	9 (12), 2:30	31 Mar 2018	BT Convention Centre, Liverpool, England	Won WBA Continental light-welterweight title
16	Loss	15–1	Michal Syrowatka	TKO	12 (12), 1:48	15 Jul 2017	Wembley Arena, London, England	Lost WBA Continental light-welterweight title
15	Win	15–0	Zoltan Szabo	KO	9 (12), 2:22	21 Jan 2017	Guild Hall, Preston, England	Retained WBA Continental light-welterweight title
14	Win	14–0	Lukasz Janik	TKO	4 (6), 2:04	10 Dec 2016	DW Stadium, Wigan, England	
13	Win	13–0	Xavier Luques Castillo	UD	12	30 Apr 2016	DW Stadium, Wigan, England	Retained WBA Continental light-welterweight title
12	Win	12–0	Jarkko Putkonen	TKO	6 (12), 1:26	5 Mar 2016	Devonshire House Hotel, Liverpool, England	Won vacant WBA Continental light-welterweight title
11	Win	11–0	Ryan Hardy	TKO	2 (8), 1:19	12 Dec 2015	Hilton Hotel, Blackpool, England	
10	Win	10–0	Mikhail Avakian	TKO	1 (8), 1:57	26 Sep 2015	Chilwell Olympia Sports Centre, Chilwell, England	
9	Win	9–0	Fonz Alexander	TKO	1 (6), 2:29	18 Jul 2015	Hilton Hotel, Sheffield, England	
8	Win	8–0	Gheorghe Ghiompirica	RTD	1 (6), 3:00	28 Nov 2014	Bowlers Exhibition Centre, Manchester, England	
7	Win	7–0	Kakha Avetisiani	TKO	6 (6), 0:53	25 Oct 2014	Ice Arena, Hull, England	
6	Win	6–0	George Watson	TKO	1 (6), 1:59	24 May 2014	Deeside Leisure Centre, Queensferry, Wales	
5	Win	5–0	Mark McKray	PTS	8	15 Mar 2014	Echo Arena, Liverpool, England	
4	Win	4–0	Renald Garrido	PTS	6	14 Dec 2013	Olympia, Liverpool, England	
3	Win	3–0	Kevin McCauley	PTS	6	22 Nov 2013	Bowlers Exhibition Centre, Manchester, England	
2	Win	2–0	Josh Thorne	TKO	1 (4), 2:09	21 Sep 2013	Olympia, Liverpool, England	
1	Win	1–0	Carl Allan	RTD	1 (4), 3:00	7 Jun 2013	Olympia, Liverpool, England	

Sporting positions
Regional boxing titles
Vacant Title last held by Tommy Martin	WBA Continental light-welterweight champion 5 March 2016 – 5 July 2017	Succeeded by Michal Syrowatka
Preceded by Michal Syrowatka	WBA Continental light-welterweight champion 31 March 2018 – 2018; Vacated	Vacant Title next held by Khariton Agrba
Vacant Title last held by Jack Catterall	British light-welterweight champion 13 October 2018 – 2019; Vacated	Vacant
Preceded by Glenn Foot	Commonwealth light-welterweight champion 13 October 2018 – 2 February 2019; Vacated	Vacant Title next held by Philip Bowes
Preceded by Joe Hughes	European light-welterweight champion 30 March 2019 – April 2019; Vacated	Vacant Title next held by Sandor Martin
