= Johan Cruyff Stadium =

Association football stadium in Barcelona, Spain

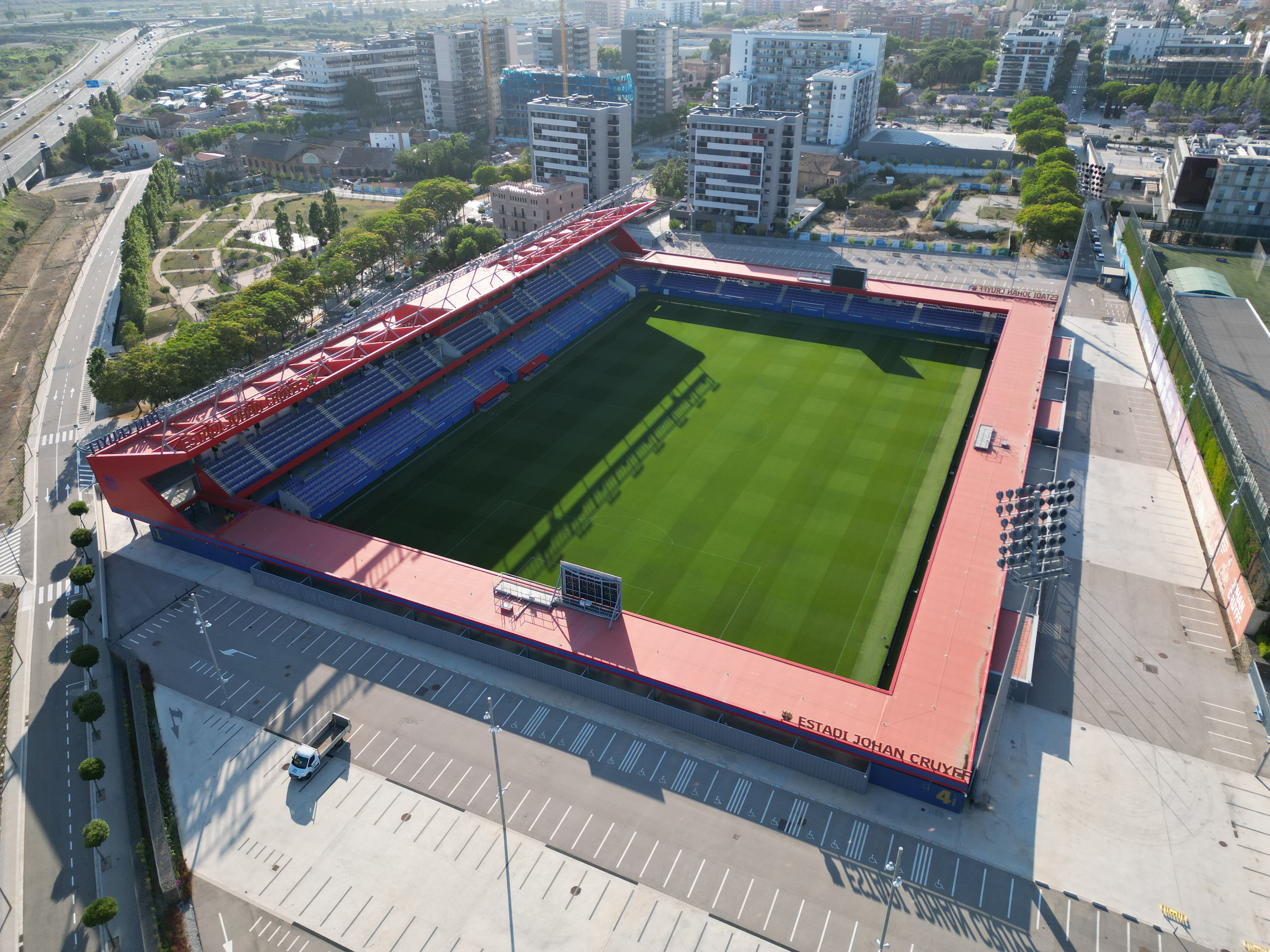
- UEFA
- Interactive map of Johan Cruyff Stadium
- Full name: Estadi Johan Cruyff
- Location: Sant Joan Despí, Barcelona, Spain
- Coordinates: 41°22′27″N 02°03′02″E
- Owner: Barcelona
- Operator: Barcelona
- Capacity: 6,000
- Surface: Grass
- Record attendance: 5,842 (Barcelona v Valencia; 15 September 2025)
- Field size: 105m x 68m

Construction
- Groundbreaking: 14 September 2017; 9 years ago
- Built: 2017–2019
- Opened: 27 August 2019
- Cost: €12 million

Tenants
- Barcelona B Barcelona Femení; Barcelona Juvenil A (U19 A team); Barcelona (2025; two league matches)

Johan Cruyff Stadium (Catalan: Estadi Johan Cruyff) is a football stadium operated by Barcelona in Sant Joan Despí, Province of Barcelona, Catalonia, Spain, located in the Ciutat Esportiva Joan Gamper, the club's training facility and youth academy, about 7 km from the Camp Nou. The stadium is home to Barcelona Femení, Barcelona B and Juvenil A (U19 A team). It is named in honor of legendary Dutch footballer Johan Cruyff who died in March 2016.

It is a UEFA Category 3 stadium and houses 6,000 supporters. As part of the Espai Barça project, it is the replacement for the Mini Estadi, which was in front of the Camp Nou and was demolished in 2020, and the land of the Mini Estadi will be used to build the Nou Palau Blaugrana.

== History ==
Estadi Johan Cruyff broke ground on 14 September 2017 and was completed in 2019. It was opened on 27 August 2019 with a friendly match between the under-19 teams of Barcelona and Ajax. The match ended up in a 0–2 score where Ajax was the winner. On 26 August 2019, a day before the stadium was officially opened to the public, Barcelona paid tribute to Cruyff by unveiling his statue at the Camp Nou. The stadium was intermittently the home of Barcelona for several games at the beginning of the 2025–26 season, before the re-opening of the Camp Nou in November 2025.
