= Sam Maxwell (boxer) =

British boxer (born 1988)

Personal information
- Nickname: Super Sam
- Born: 17 October 1988 (age 38) Hackney, London, England
- Weight: Super-lightweight

Boxing career
- Stance: Orthodox

Boxing record
- Total fights: 20
- Wins: 17
- Win by KO: 11
- Losses: 3
Medal record
Men's amateur boxing
Representing England
Commonwealth Games
Bronze medal – third place	2014 Glasgow	Light-welterweight
English National Championships
Gold medal – first place	2011 Colchester	Lightweight
Gold medal – first place	2014 Liverpool	Light-welterweight
Great Britain Championships
Gold medal – first place	2011 London	Lightweight
Strandzha Cup
Gold medal – first place	2014 Sofia	Light-welterweight

Samuel Maxwell (born 17 October 1988) is an English professional boxer. He held the Commonwealth super-lightweight title from 2021 to 2023 and the British super-lightweight title from 2021 to 2022. As an amateur he won a bronze medal at the 2014 Commonwealth Games.

== Amateur career ==
Maxwell started boxing aged 11 at the local Higher Side gym, and went on to join the Solly amateur gym in Liverpool going on to win the ABA Championships. He represented Great Britain from 2012 to 2016 and competed for the British Lionhearts squad at the 2015 World Series of Boxing competition (WSB). He boxed Vasyl Lomachenko twice during the WSB. His wins included Morocco, Algeria, Germany, Kazakhstan and China. He won a bronze at the 2014 Commonwealth Games

== Professional career ==
Maxwell made his professional debut on 7 October 2016, scoring a four-round points decision victory over Ibrar Riyaz at the Greenbanks Sports Academy in Liverpool.

After compiling a record of 10–0 including eight knockouts, he faced Sabri Sediri for the vacant WBO European super-lightweight title on 23 March 2019 at the Leicester Arena. In the final minute of the contest Sediri began showboating, dancing around the ring with his hands down by his side. With less than 15 seconds to go and his opponent still neglecting his defence, Maxwell landed a solid right hand to leave Sediri sprawled out on the canvas. He was able to get back to his feet before the referee's count of 10 but immediately stumbled on unsteady legs, prompting the referee to call a halt to the contest with seconds left in the round, awarding Maxwell a 10th round technical knockout and the WBO European title.

After a second-round knockout win over Oscar Amador in a six-round non-title fight in July, Maxwell retained his title against Connor Parker with a seventh-round technical knockout in November.

Maxwell retained his title with a seventh round stoppage of Connor Parker at Arena Birmingham on 30 November 2019 and a unanimous decision win over Joe Hughes at BT Sport Studio in London on 20 August 2020.

On 28 August 2021, he challenged British and Commonwealth super-lightweight champion Akeem Ennis-Brown at Arena Birmingham. He won via unanimous decision.

Maxwell faced Alejandro Meneses for the vacant IBO super-lightweight title at Liverpool Arena on 22 April 2022, losing by stoppage in the ninth round.

He returned to winning ways in his next fight, recurring a points victory against Shaun Cooper over six rounds at Nottingham Arena on 18 February 2023.

Next, Maxwell faced Dalton Smith at Sheffield Arena on 1 July 2023, with his Commonwealth super-lightweight title, and the British super-lightweight title which he had vacated and had subsequently been won by his opponent, on the line. Maxwell lost by stoppage in the seventh round.

He challenged WBO European super-lightweight champion Seán McComb at SSE Arena in Belfast, Northern Ireland, on 2 December 2023. Maxwell was knocked to the canvas three times during the fight, and although he managed to make it through the full 10 rounds, he lost via unanimous decision.

== Personal life ==
Maxwell was born in Hackney, London. He moved to Prescot, Knowsley, in 1997 following the unexpected death of his father.

== Professional boxing record ==
20 fights	17 wins	3 losses
By knockout	11	2
By decision	6	1

No.	Result	Record	Opponent	Type	Round, time	Date	Location	Notes
20	Loss	17–3	Seán McComb	UD	10	2 Dec 2023	SSE Arena, Belfast, Northern Ireland	For WBO European super-lightweight title
19	Loss	17–2	Dalton Smith	TKO	7 (12), 1:34	1 Jul 2023	Sheffield Arena, Sheffield, England	For British and Commonwealth super-lightweight titles
18	Win	17–1	Shaun Cooper	PTS	6	18 Feb 2023	Nottingham Arena, Nottingham, England	
17	Loss	16–1	Alejandro Meneses	TKO	9 (12), 2:39	22 Apr 2022	Liverpool Arena, Liverpool, England	For vacant IBO super-lightweight title
16	Win	16–0	Akeem Ennis-Brown	UD	12	28 Aug 2021	Arena Birmingham, Birmingham, England	Won Commonwealth and British super-lightweight titles
15	Win	15–0	Ben Fields	PTS	8	26 Mar 2021	Copper Box Arena, London, England	
14	Win	14–0	Joe Hughes	UD	10	29 Aug 2020	BT Sport Studio, London, England	Retained WBO European super-lightweight title
13	Win	13–0	Connor Parker	TKO	7 (10), 2:45	30 Nov 2019	Arena Birmingham, Birmingham, England	Retained WBO European super-lightweight title
12	Win	12–0	Oscar Amador	KO	2 (6), 1:23	12 Jul 2019	Olympia, Liverpool, England	
11	Win	11–0	Sabri Sediri	TKO	10 (10), 2:46	21 Mar 2019	Leicester Arena, Leicester, England	Won vacant WBO European super-lightweight title
10	Win	10–0	Jamie Quinn	KO	1 (6)	22 Dec 2018	Manchester Arena, Manchester, England	
9	Win	9–0	Chris Truman	RTD	3 (6), 3:00	18 Aug 2018	Windsor Park, Belfast, Northern Ireland	
8	Win	8–0	Kane Baker	PTS	6	9 Jun 2018	Manchester Arena, Manchester, England	
7	Win	7–0	Michael Carrero	KO	1 (6), 0:56	21 Apr 2018	SSE Arena, Belfast, Northern Ireland	
6	Win	6–0	Elvin Perez	TKO	1 (6), 0:42	16 Mar 2018	Greenbank Sports Academy, Liverpool, England	
5	Win	5–0	Oszkar Fiko	KO	3 (6), 1:50	25 Nov 2017	König Pilsener Arena, Oberhausen, Germany	
4	Win	4–0	Gyula Tallosi	KO	1 (6), 2:55	21 Oct 2017	First Direct Arena, Leeds, England	
3	Win	3–0	Angel Emilov	TKO	3 (4)	17 Jun 2017	Waterfront Hall, Belfast, Northern Ireland	
2	Win	2–0	Georgie Wright	TKO	5 (6), 0:50	22 Apr 2017	Leicester Arena, Leicester, England	
1	Win	1–0	Ibrar Riyaz	PTS	4	7 Oct 2016	Greenbank Sports Academy, Liverpool, England	
