= Coliseum da Coruña =

Arena in A Coruña, Galicia, Spain

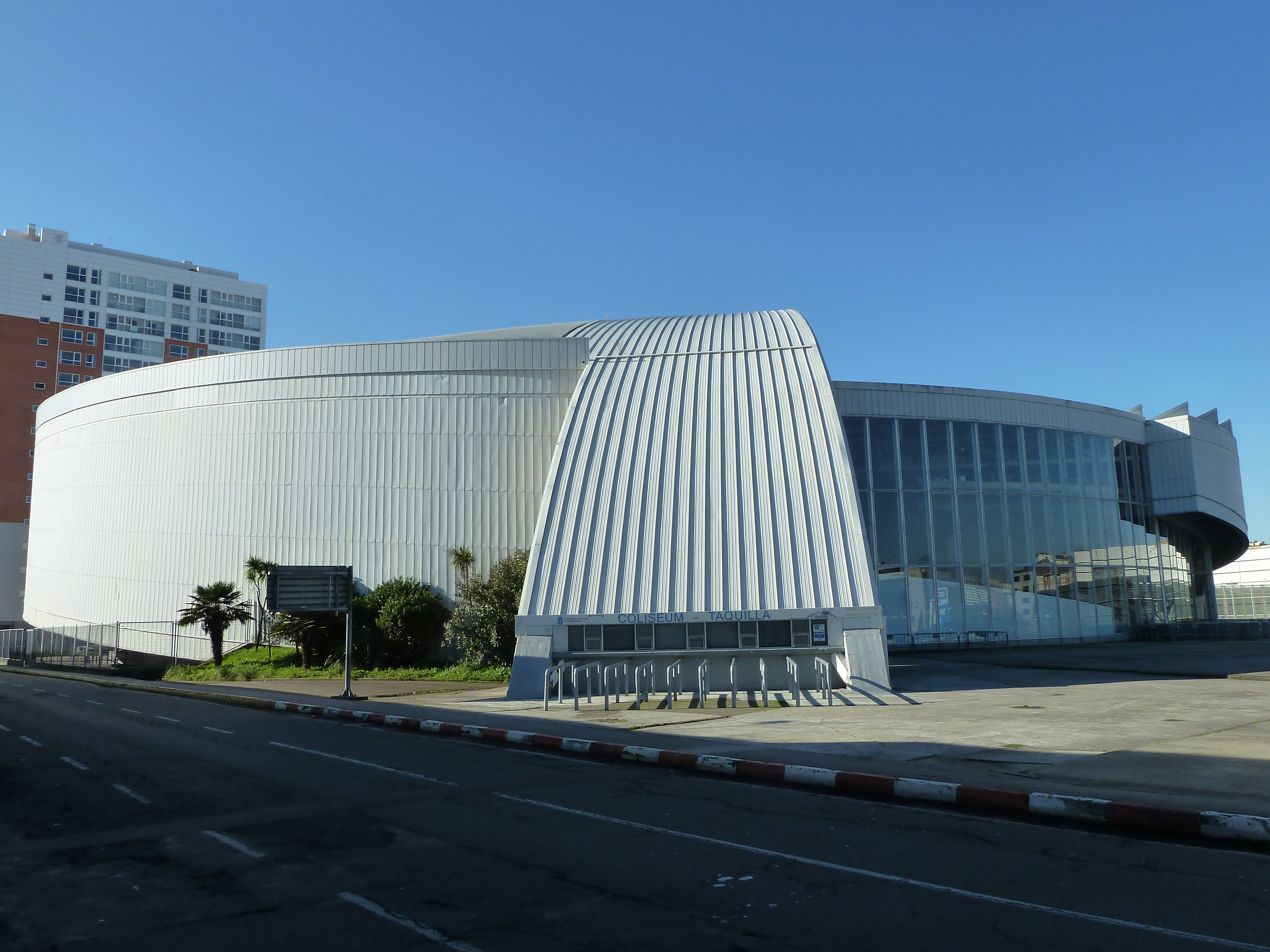
- Interactive map of Coliseum da Coruña
- Location: Avda. Alfonso Molina, s/n, 15008, A Coruña, Galicia, Spain
- Coordinates: 43°20′19″N 8°24′34″W
- Capacity: 11,000

Construction
- Built: 1990
- Opened: 12 August 1991
- Architect: Salvador Pérez Arroyo

Tenant
- Básquet Coruña (2024–present)

Coliseum da Coruña is an indoor arena for concerts and shows used in A Coruña, Galicia, Spain. The venue holds 11,000 people for concerts. It was designed by Spanish architect Salvador Pérez Arroyo, built in 1990 and open on August 12, 1991. It is also occasionally used for ice skating.

It hosted twice the Copa del Rey de Baloncesto: in 1993 and 2016.

The arena hosted superstar, Whitney Houston on her international trek I'm Your Baby Tonight World Tour on September 29, 1991. The stop was recorded and aired on TV in several markets of Spain, and select countries in Europe.

== See also ==
- List of indoor arenas in Spain
