= Sam Maxwell (weightlifter) =

American weightlifter (born 1964)

Sam Maxwell (born February 17, 1964) was a weightlifter for the United States. His coaches were John Thrush and himself.

== Weightlifting achievements ==
- Senior World team member (1989)
- Junior National Champion (1983 & 1984)
- Junior World team member (1983 & 1984)
- All-time Junior American record holder in clean and jerk
- Official 2000 Olympic Trials Commentator for NBC
- 2003 World Championships announcer

== Note(s) of interest ==
- Competed in hammer throw at University of Washington (189 feet first year)
- Snatched 300 lbs. for 17 straight years (1983-1999)
- Clean and jerked 400 lbs for 18 straight years (1983-2000)
