= León Arena =

Bullring in León, Spain

Coordinates: 42°35′13.41″N 5°34′20.95″W

León Arena

León Arena, also known locally as Plaza de Toros de León is an arena in León, Spain It is primarily used for musical concerts and bullfighting, however it has been used for handball and basketball too. The arena opened in 1948 as a bullring, but in 2000 it was covered, becoming a modern indoor arena. It has a seating capacity for 10,000 people.

== See also ==
- List of indoor arenas in Spain
