= Mini Estadi =

Former football stadium

Miniestadi
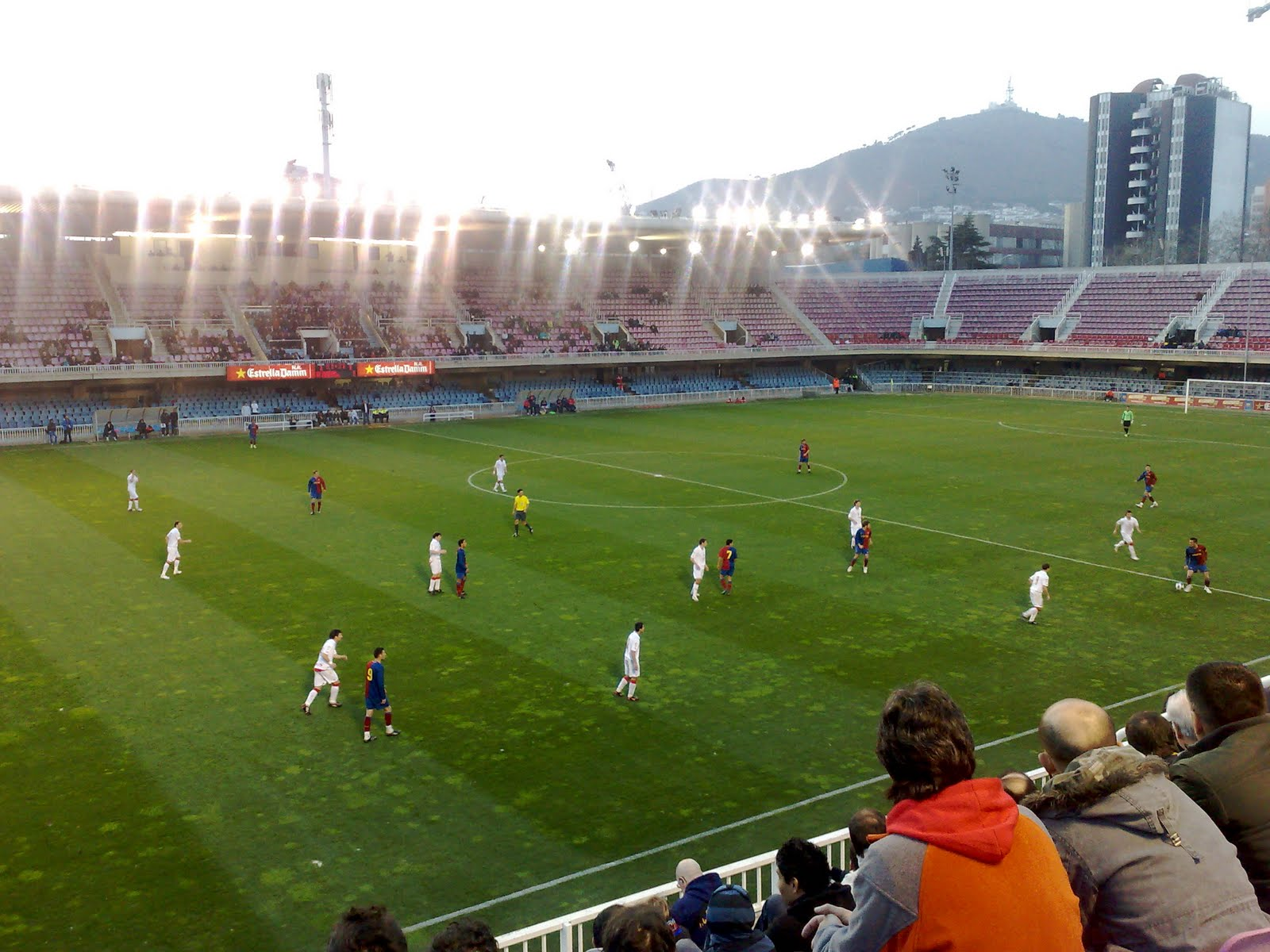
- Interactive map of Miniestadi
- Location: Avinguda Aristides Maillol, s/n 08028, Barcelona, Spain
- Coordinates: 41°22′47″N 2°07′05″E
- Owner: Barcelona
- Operator: Barcelona B
- Capacity: 15,276
- Surface: Grass
- Field size: 103 m × 65 m (338 ft × 213 ft)

Construction
- Opened: 23 September 1982
- Closed: 2019
- Demolished: 2020
- Architect: Josep Casals
- Project manager: Ramón Domènech

Tenants
- Barcelona B (1982–2019); Barcelona C (1982–2007); Barcelona Dragons (NFL Europe) (2002–2003); FC Barcelona Juvenil A(UEFA matches)(2007-2019); FC Barcelona Femení(UEFA matches)(2012-2019)

Miniestadi (Catalan pronunciation: [ˈmini əsˈtaði], meaning in English "Mini Stadium"), was a football stadium in Barcelona, Catalonia, Spain. The 15,276-seat stadium was situated across from Camp Nou, the home stadium of Barcelona. The stadium was home to Barcelona B, FCB's reserve team, as well as their women's team and Juvenil A. The stadium was replaced by the newly built Estadi Johan Cruyff, which was completed on 27 August 2019.

== Sporting use ==
The stadium was home to Barcelona B, the reserve side of the famous Catalan club, until they moved to the Estadi Johan Cruyff in the Ciutat Esportiva Joan Gamper sports complex for the 2019–20 season.

The stadium was also home to Barcelona C until July 2007, when they disbanded. It was also home to the Barcelona Dragons, an NFL Europe American football team, until they were disbanded in 2003.

It occasionally hosted the national team of Andorra as well.

== Concerts ==
Bob Dylan performed here with Carlos Santana on 28 June 1984, during his 1984 European Tour.

Queen performed at the stadium during their Magic Tour on 1 August 1986.

David Bowie performed, on two consecutive nights, at the stadium during his Glass Spider Tour on 7–8 July 1987.

Elton John performed at the stadium during his One Tour on 21 July 1992. The concert was recorded and released on VHS and DVD.

== Present ==
As part of the Espai Barça project, the Mini Estadi was demolished at the conclusion of the 2018–2019 season following the opening of the Estadi Johan Cruyff to make way for the Nou Palau Blaugrana. The new Estadi Johan Cruyff is built at the Ciutat Esportiva Joan Gamper campus, which will serve as the new home of Barcelona's reserve and women's teams.
