= Nou Palau Blaugrana =

Planned arena in Barcelona, Spain

- Interactive map of Nou Palau Blaugrana
- Location: Barcelona, Spain
- Coordinates: 41°22′47″N 02°07′06″E
- Owner: Barcelona
- Capacity: 15,000

Construction
- Opened: 2029 (planned)

The Nou Palau Blaugrana will be a multi-sports indoor arena, located in Barcelona, Catalonia, Spain. The arena will serve as the new home arena for the basketball (Barcelona Bàsquet), handball (Barcelona Handbol) and Futsal (Barcelona Futsal) sections of the multi-sports club Barcelona. The Nou Palau Blaugrana will have a maximum capacity of 15,000 spectators.

It will be built on the site formerly occupied by the Mini Estadi, which was demolished in 2020 after the construction of the Estadi Johan Cruyff which was completed and inaugurated in 2019. The new arena was initially expected to be finished by the end of 2027, and will replace the original Palau Blaugrana, which is across the street and currently serves as the home arena for Barcelona's basketball, handball and futsal teams.

In February 2026, during the run-up to the FC Barcelona presidential election held in March, both Joan Laporta and Víctor Font's platforms released information about their own Nou Palau Blaugrana project. The winning candidacy's project aimed to start construction by 2027 with completion slated for late 2029 or early 2030. The new arena would host the basketball games as well as international competitions, concerts and other events.

== See also ==
- List of indoor arenas in Spain
