= Carmine Tommasone =

Italian boxer (born 1984)

Personal information
- Born: 30 March 1984 (age 42) Avellino, Campania, Italy
- Height: 168 cm (5 ft 6 in)
- Weight: Featherweight

Boxing career
- Stance: Orthodox

Boxing record
- Total fights: 21
- Wins: 20
- Win by KO: 5
- Losses: 1

Carmine Tommasone (born 30 March 1984) is an Italian professional boxer. He competed in the men's lightweight event at the 2016 Summer Olympics, where he reached the round of 16

== Professional boxing record ==
21 fights	20 wins	1 loss
By knockout	5	1
By decision	15	0

No.	Result	Record	Opponent	Type	Round, time	Date	Location	Notes
21	Win	20–1	(Nicaragua) Brayan Mairena	UD	6	19 Sep 2019	Tuscany Hall, Florence, Italy	
20	Loss	19–1	(Mexico) Óscar Valdez	TKO	7 (12), 0:09	2 Feb 2019	(United States) Ford Center at The Star, Frisco, Texas, US	For WBO featherweight title
19	Win	19–0	(Mexico) Jovanni Martinez	UD	6	30 Nov 2018	Tuscany Hall, Florence, Italy	
18	Win	18–0	(Serbia) Milan Savić	UD	6	23 Feb 2018	PalaLottomatica, Rome, Italy	
17	Win	17–0	(Nicaragua) Lester Cantillano	PTS	6	20 May 2017	Palasport Città di Vicenza, Vicenza, Italy	
16	Win	16–0	(Mexico) Jesus Antonio Rios	RTD	4 (12), 3:00	23 Feb 2018	Palasport Del Mauro, Avellino, Italy	Won vacant WBA Intercontinental featherweight title
15	Win	15–0	(United Kingdom) Jon Slowey	UD	12	26 Sep 2015	Area Mercato, Caivano, Italy	Won vacant European featherweight title
14	Win	14–0	(Chile) Cristian Palma	UD	12	4 Apr 2015	Palasport Del Mauro, Avellino, Italy	Won vacant WBA Intercontinental featherweight title
13	Win	13–0	(Italy) Mario Pisanti	MD	10	31 Oct 2014	Palazzetto dello Sport, Rezzato, Italy	Won vacant Italian featherweight title
12	Win	12–0	(Italy) Luca Genovese	PTS	6	29 Aug 2014	Stadio Enzo Mazzella, Ischia, Italy	
11	Win	11–0	(Italy) Mario Salis	TKO	8 (10)	25 Apr 2014	Centro ASI, Solofra, Italy	
10	Win	10–0	(Italy) Giuseppe Bergantino	PTS	6	28 Mar 2014	Palasport ESTRA, Arezzo, Italy	
9	Win	9–0	(Hungary) Zoltan Horvath	PTS	6	13 Dec 2013	Palazzetto dello Sport, Rezzato, Italy	
8	Win	8–0	(Nicaragua) Santos Medrano	PTS	8	15 Mar 2013	Palasport Fabrizio Meoni, Castiglion Fiorentino, Italy	
7	Win	7–0	(Italy) Marco Delmestro	PTS	4	30 Nov 2012	Palaindoor di Ancona, Ancona, Italy	
6	Win	6–0	(Italy) Raffaele Laezza	PTS	6	10 Aug 2011	Avellino, Italy	
5	Win	5–0	(Morocco) Youness Laribi	PTS	6	24 Jun 2011	Avellino, Italy	
4	Win	4–0	(Italy) Andrea Scarpa	PTS	6	3 Jun 2011	Ristorante Villa La Tortuga, Castel Volturno, Italy	
3	Win	3–0	(Romania) George Grigoriu	TKO	1 (6)	10 Dec 2010	Pagani, Italy	
2	Win	2–0	(Hungary) Istvan Petrovics	TKO	3 (6)	31 Jul 2010	Contrada, Italy	
1	Win	1–0	(Hungary) Istvan Atjai	TKO	3 (6)	18 Jun 2010	Anfiteatro Romano, Santa Maria Capua Vetere, Italy	
