= Iradier Arena =

Multi-purpose arena in Vitoria-Gasteiz, Spain

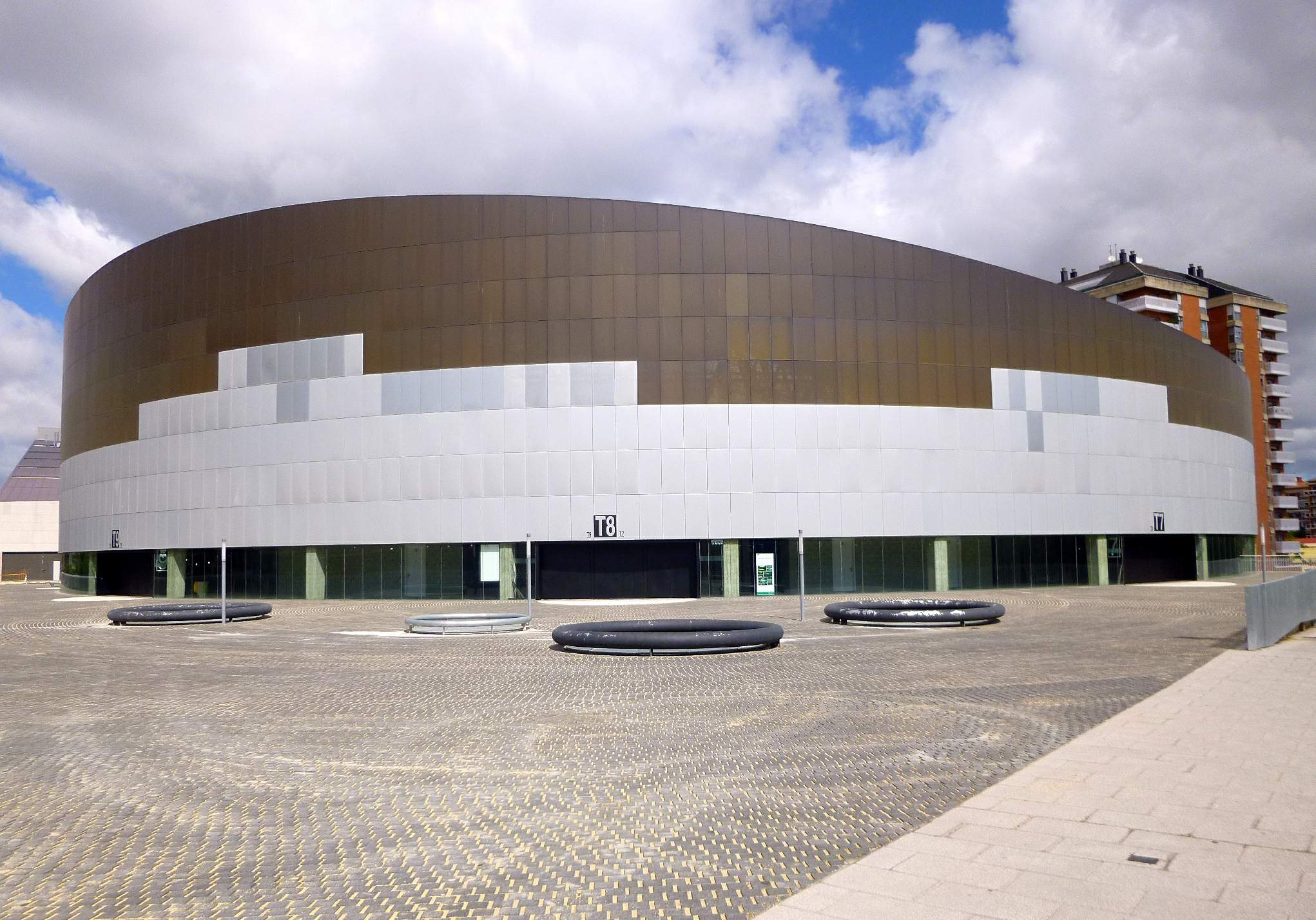
- Interactive map of Iradier Arena
- Full name: Plaza de Toros de Vitoria-Gasteiz
- Location: Vitoria-Gasteiz, Spain
- Coordinates: 42°50′27″N 2°39′52″W
- Owner: Vitoria-Gasteiz City Council
- Capacity: 10,625 (full configuration); 8,512 (basketball); 7,827 (permanent seating)
- Record attendance: 8,460 (Baskonia vs Bilbao Basket, 16 November 2011)

Construction
- Opened: 1941
- Renovated: 2006

Tenant
- Baskonia (Aug 2011–Jan 2012)

Iradier Arena, also known as Plaza de Toros de Vitoria-Gasteiz, is an arena and bullring in Vitoria-Gasteiz, Spain. It is primarily used for bullfighting and basketball, and was the home to the Baskonia while the Fernando Buesa Arena was expanded. It opened in 1941 and holds 10,625 spectators.

== Attendances ==
This is a list of league and EuroLeague games attendances of Baskonia at Iradier Arena.

| Liga ACB | | | | | EuroLeague | | | | |
| Season | Total | High | Low | Average | Season | Total | High | Low | Average |
|---|---|---|---|---|---|---|---|---|---|
| 2011–12 | 63,945 | 8,442 | 7,600 | 7,993 | 2011–12 | 40,722 | 8,460 | 7,923 | 8,144 |

== See also ==
- List of indoor arenas in Spain
