= Plaza de Toros de La Ribera =

Bullring in Logroño, Spain

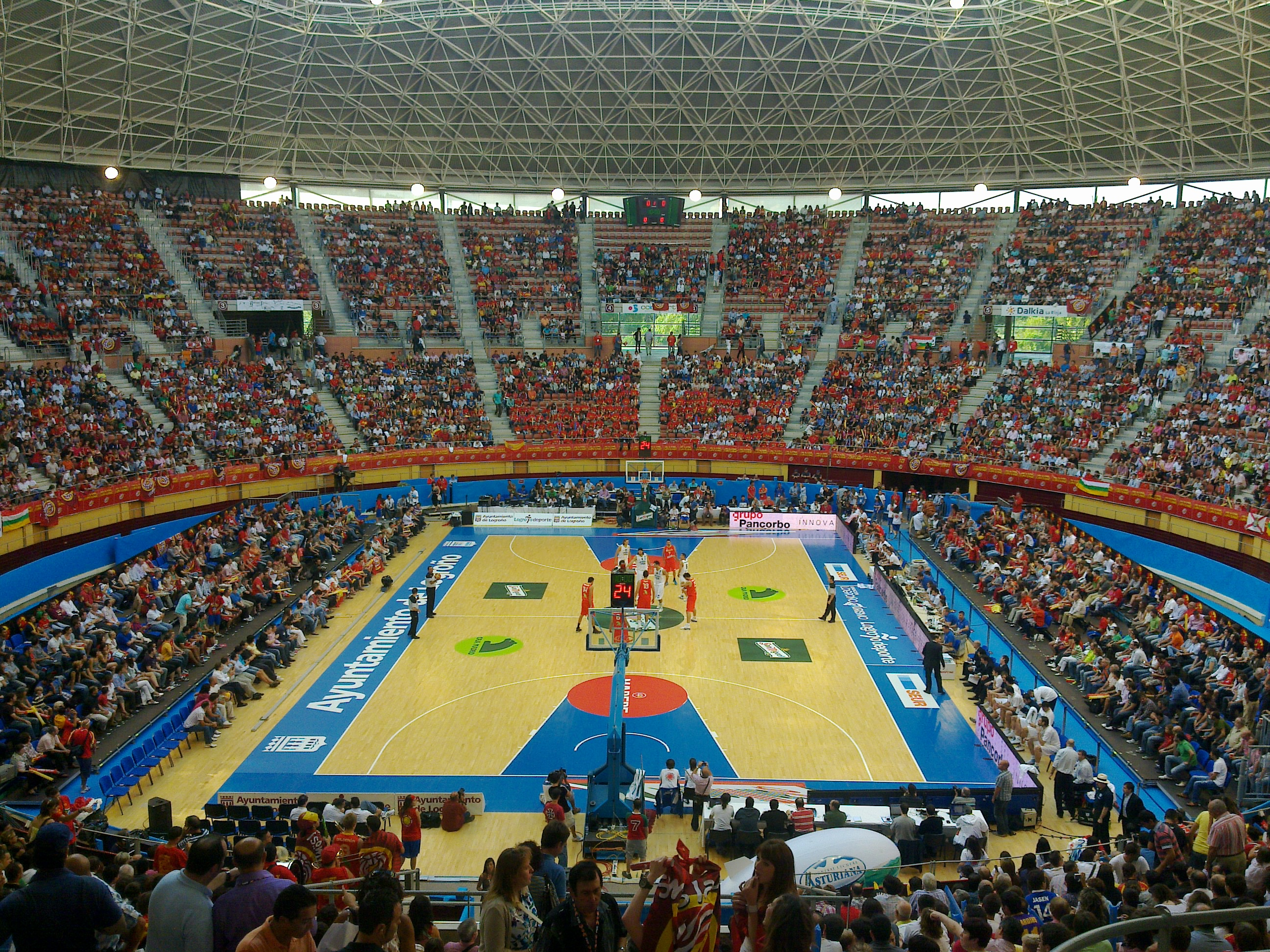
- Interactive map of Plaza de Toros de La Ribera
- Full name: Plaza de Toros de La Ribera
- Location: Logroño, Spain
- Coordinates: 42°28′17″N 2°26′14″W
- Capacity: 11,046

Construction
- Opened: September 21, 2001

Plaza de Toros de La Ribera is a bullring in Logroño, Spain. It is currently used for bullfighting, with a retractable roof, has also hosted basketball and 2010 Davis Cup tennis. The stadium holds 11,046 spectators. It was opened in 2001.

== See also ==
- List of indoor arenas in Spain
