= La Cubierta =

Bullring in Leganés, Spain

- Los Tejados
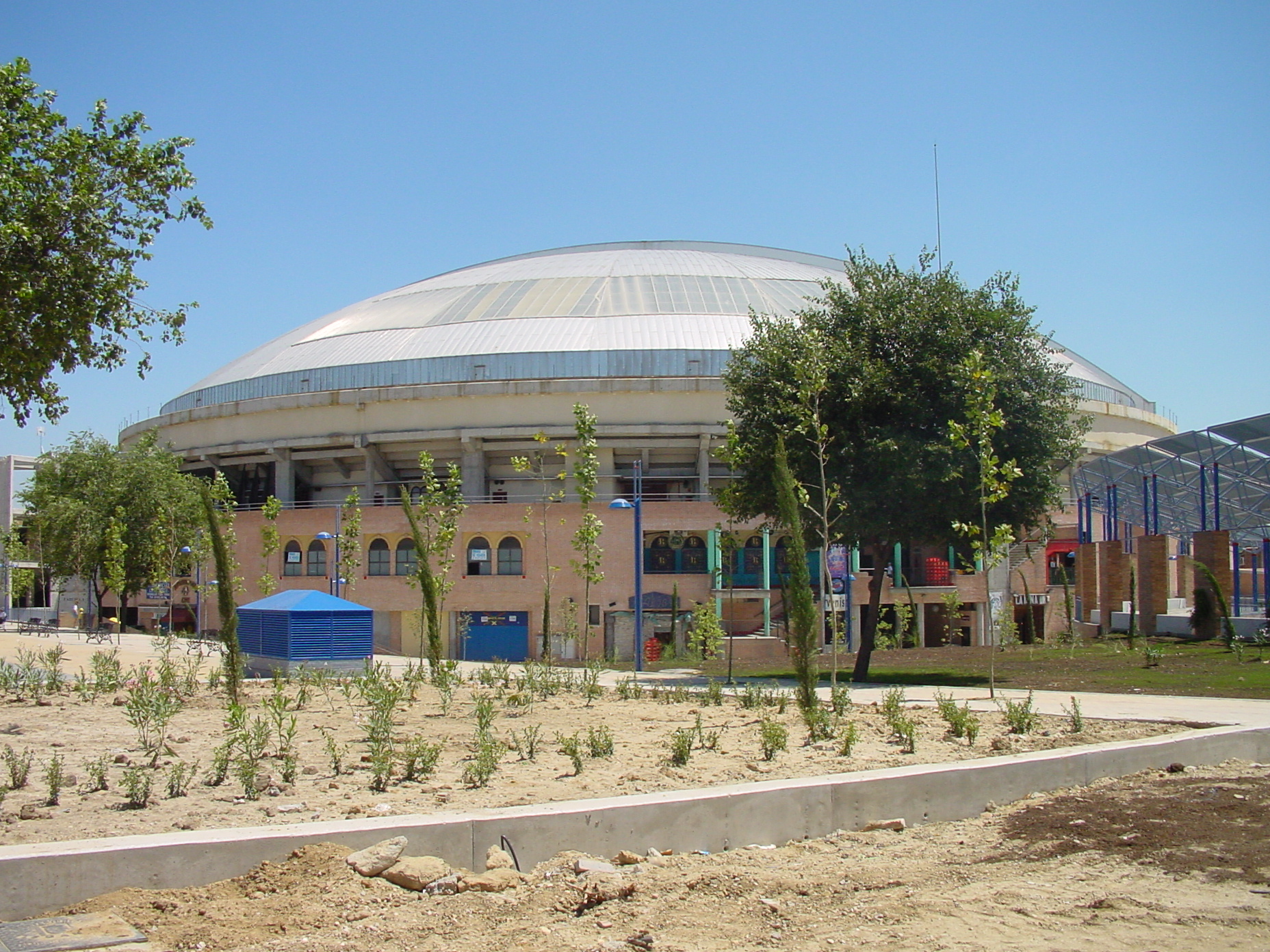
- Interactive map of La Cubierta
- Full name: Multiusos la Cubierta
- Location: Leganés, Spain
- Capacity: 10,000

Construction
- Opened: 1997

La Cubierta is a bullring in Leganés, Spain. It is currently used for bull fighting and concerts. The stadium holds 10,000 spectators. It was opened in 1997.
