= Points decision =

Winning criterion in several full-contact combat sports

A points decision (PTS) is a winning criterion in several full-contact combat sports, such as boxing, kickboxing, Muay Thai, mixed martial arts and other sports involving striking. Unlike normal decisions where there are three judges who agree on which fighter won the match, the fight is scored by the referee, who determines who wins the bout.

In some boxing matches, particularly when sanctioned by the British Boxing Board of Control in the United Kingdom, the referee is responsible for scoring (round by round) which fighter they feel is winning (and losing). Sometimes it denotes that the actual scores are unknown.

A unanimous decision is also sometimes referred to as a "win on points".

== See also ==
- 10 Point System
