= List of schools for people on the autism spectrum =

This is a list of schools for people on the autism spectrum.

== Australia ==
- Ashdale Secondary College
- Alkimos College
- Western Autistic School
- Aspect

== Canada ==
- Beating the Odds

== Singapore ==
- Rainbow Centre
- Pathlight School
- Eden School

== United Kingdom ==
- Alderwasley Hall School, Derbyshire
- Breckenbrough School, North Yorkshire
- Exeter House School, Wiltshire
- The Heights Academy, West Midlands
- Kensington Aldridge Academy, London
- Limpsfield Grange School, Surrey
- Pennyhooks Farm Trust, Oxfordshire
- Silverwood School, Wiltshire
- Spa School Bermondsey, London
- Swalcliffe Park School, Oxfordshire
- Tettenhall Wood School, West Midlands
- TreeHouse School, Haringey, London

== United States ==
=== Arizona ===
- Gateway Academy

=== California ===
- Exceptional Minds
- Meristem
- Orion Academy
- The Center for Autism and Related Disorders (CARD), [Fresno] - A specialized institution providing educational and therapeutic services to individuals with autism spectrum disorder.

=== Connecticut ===
- Franklin Academy

=== Georgia ===
- Lionheart School

=== Massachusetts ===
- New England Center for Children

=== Michigan ===
- Burger School for Students with Autism

=== New Jersey ===
- Alpine Learning Group

=== New York ===
- Eden II School for Autistic Children
