= Kris Clyburn =

American basketball player (born 1996)

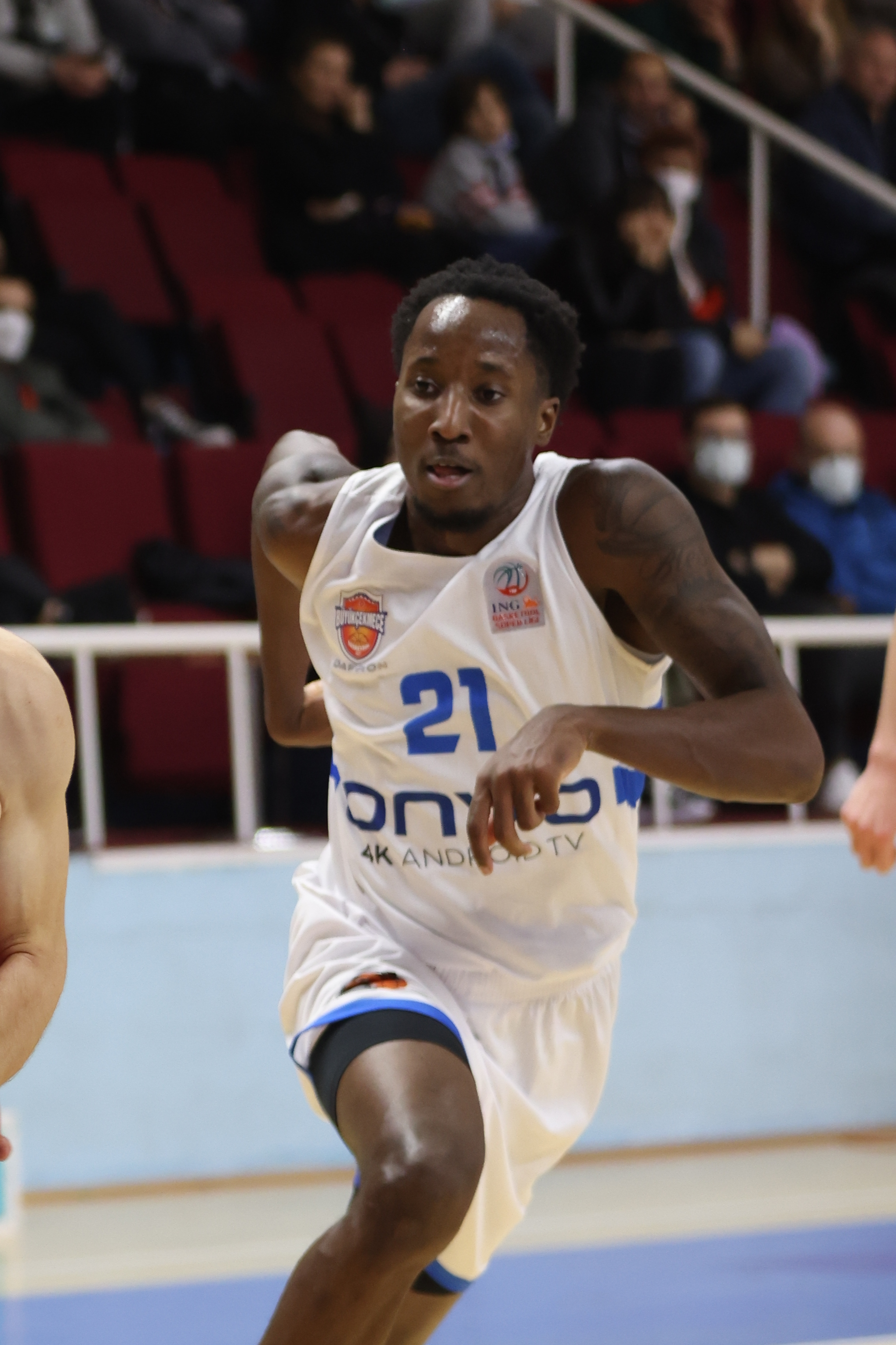
- Clyburn with Büyükçekmece in 2022

Free Agent
- Position: Shooting guard / small forward

Personal information
- Born: April 20, 1996 (age 30) Detroit, Michigan, U.S.
- Listed height: 6 ft 6 in (1.98 m)
- Listed weight: 180 lb (82 kg)

Career information
- High school: Romulus (Romulus, Michigan)
- College: Ranger College (2015–2016); UNLV (2016–2019)
- NBA draft: 2019: undrafted
- Playing career: 2019–present

Career history
- 2019–2020: Astoria Bydgoszcz
- 2020–2021: BC Minsk
- 2021–2022: Maccabi Rishon LeZion
- 2022: Büyükçekmece
- 2022–2023: Mitteldeutscher BC
- 2023–2024: BCM Gravelines-Dunkerque
- 2024–2025: SG Apes
- 2025–2026: Tianjin Pioneers
- 2026: Al-Muharraq
- 2026: Mitteldeutscher BC

Career highlights
- Third-team All-Mountain West (2019); Mountain West All-Defensive Team (2019)

Kristopher "Kris" Joshon Clyburn (born April 20, 1996) is an American professional basketball player who last played for Mitteldeutscher BC of the German Basketball Bundesliga (BBL). Standing at 6 ft 6 in (1.98 m), he plays at the shooting guard and small forward positions.

== Early life ==
Clyburn was born in Detroit, Michigan as one of three sons. His parents are Deldra Jackson and William Clyburn. He has two brothers, named Will Clyburn and Terrell. Clyburn attended Romulus Senior High School in Romulus, Michigan, graduating in 2014.

== College career ==
Clyburn played his freshman year at Ranger College. During the 2015–16 season in which he played 38 games, he averaged 14.3 points, 5.2 rebounds, 3.5 assists, and 1.3 steals per game, earning North Texas Junior College Athletic Association Defensive Player of the Year honors. Clyburn led the Rangers team to a 35–3 overall record, helping them win the conference championship with a flawless 12–0 record. In April 2016, he transferred to UNLV, choosing the Runnin' Rebels over Houston and UTEP.

Clyburn played 32 games during the 2016–17 season. He started 22 games and averaged 7.3 points and 5.3 rebounds per game. Clyburn led the team with 170 total rebounds. His career-highs include 18 points scored against Fresno State. He scored his next career-high of 13 rebounds against Boise State and scored a career-high of 4 steals against Colorado State. During his junior year Clyburn played 33 games, starting in the first 20 games. He averaged 7.3 points, 1.5 assists and collected 3.2 rebounds per game. Clyburn scored career-highs of 20 points against Northern Iowa, and made 6 assists against San José State. During Clyburn's senior year he played 31 games and averaged 14.1 points, 5.3 rebounds and 1.2 assists per game. He was named to the Third Team All-Mountain West as well as the Defensive Team.

== Professional career ==
Clyburn entered the 2019 NBA Draft but was not selected. He went on to play two games for the Milwaukee Bucks during the NBA Summer League 2019–20 season. On September 16, 2019, Clyburn signed with Astoria Bydgoszcz of the Polish Basketball League. He played 21 games during the 2019–20 season, and averaged 15.3 points, 4.6 rebounds, 1.5 assists and 1.5 steals per game. On June 11, 2020, Clyburn signed with Tsmoki-Minsk of the VTB United League. His most recent averages with the team include 25 minutes per game played, scoring 17.0 points with a 50.0 percent 3-point shot average and 4.0 rebounds.

On July 14, 2021, Clyburn signed with Maccabi Rishon LeZion of the Israeli Premier League. He averaged 12.3 points and 5.7 rebounds per game. On January 25, 2022, Clyburn signed with Büyükçekmece Basketbol of the Turkish Basketbol Süper Ligi.

On September 3, 2022, he has signed with Mitteldeutscher BC of the German Basketball Bundesliga.

During the summer of 2023, Clyburn signs for a season with the BCM Gravelines-Dunkerque.

On September 6, 2023, he signed with BCM Gravelines-Dunkerque of the French LNB Pro A.

=== SG Apes (2025) ===
In December 2024, Clyburn joined the SG Apes of The League.. He averaged 18.5 points, 6.6 rebounds, 3.3 assists, 2.0 steals and lost to Bishrelt Metal during the playoffs.

== Personal life ==
Kris has an older brother Will Clyburn (b. 1990) who plays professionally for teams in Germany, Israel, Turkey and Russia and previously played collegiately for Marshalltown CC, University of Utah and Iowa State. While attending UNLV, Clyburn majored in Urban Studies. He also credits his father for having the greatest influence on him taking up playing basketball.
