= Will Clyburn =

American basketball player (born 1990)

- Clyburn with Fenerbahçe in 2026

No. 21 – Fenerbahçe
- Position: Small forward / power forward
- League: BSL; EuroLeague

Personal information
- Born: May 17, 1990 (age 36) Detroit, Michigan, U.S.
- Listed height: 6 ft 7 in (2.01 m)
- Listed weight: 210 lb (95 kg)

Career information
- High school: Romulus (Romulus, Michigan)
- College: Marshalltown CC (2008–2010); Utah (2010–2011); Iowa State (2012–2013)
- NBA draft: 2013: undrafted
- Playing career: 2013–present

Career history
- 2013–2015: Ulm
- 2015–2016: Hapoel Holon
- 2016–2017: Darüşşafaka
- 2017–2022: CSKA Moscow
- 2022–2024: Anadolu Efes
- 2024–2025: Virtus Bologna
- 2025–2026: FC Barcelona
- 2026–present: Fenerbahçe

Career highlights
- EuroLeague champion (2019); EuroLeague Final Four MVP (2019); All-EuroLeague First Team (2019); All-EuroLeague Second Team (2021); Lega Serie A champion (2025); 3× VTB United League champion (2018, 2019, 2021); VTB United League Supercup winner (2021); 3× All-VTB United League Second Team (2018, 2021, 2022); VTB United League Supercup MVP (2021); Turkish Super League champion (2023); 2× Turkish Super Cup winner (2022, 2026); Turkish All-Star (2017); All-Israeli Premier League Second Team (2016); Israeli Premier League Top Scorer (2016); Israeli League All-Star (2016); German Bundesliga All-Star (2015); Big 12 Newcomer of the Year (2013); Big 12 All-Rookie Team (2013); Second-team All-Big 12 (2013); Second-team All-MWC (2011)
- Stats at Basketball Reference

William Dalen Clyburn (born May 17, 1990) is an American professional basketball player for Fenerbahçe of the Basketbol Süper Ligi (BSL) and the EuroLeague. He plays as a small forward. Clyburn attended three colleges, from 2008 to 2013: Marshalltown Community College, University of Utah, and Iowa State University before playing professionally in Germany, Israel, Turkey, and Russia. He was the top scorer in the Israel Basketball Premier League in 2015–16. Clyburn was named the EuroLeague Final Four MVP in 2019.

== Early life and college career ==
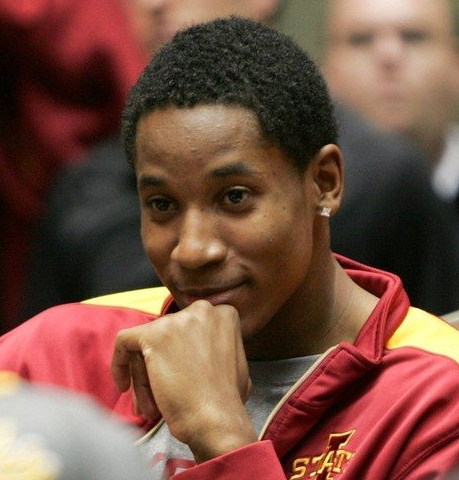
Clyburn with Iowa State in November 2011

Clyburn was born in Detroit, Michigan, he attended Romulus Senior High School in Romulus, Michigan, where he averaged 10.7 points as a senior, earning the "Best Shooter" award.

Clyburn began his college career at Marshalltown Community College, where he averaged 19.6 points and 8.7 rebounds per game as a sophomore. In one game, Clyburn had a 54-point outburst against Southeastern Community College. Clyburn earned first-team All-ICCAC honors and first-team All-Region XI accolades in 2010.

In 2010, he transferred to the University of Utah, where he earned Second-Team Mountain West Conference honors and First-Team NABC All-District 17 accolades after leading the team in scoring (17.1) and rebounding (7.8) per game. Clyburn was ranked third in the Mountain West in both scoring and rebounding and ranked 92nd nationally in scoring.

On April 12, 2011, he transferred again to Iowa State University and was forced to sit out the 2011–12 season as a redshirt. In his senior year at Iowa State, he was named Big 12 Newcomer of the Year and earned All-Big 12 Second Team honors. Clyburn led the team and ranked seventh in the Big 12 in scoring with 14.9 points per game.

== Professional career ==
=== ratiopharm Ulm (2013–2015) ===
After going undrafted in the 2013 NBA draft, Clyburn joined the Sacramento Kings for the 2013 NBA Summer League, where he averaged 7.4 points and 3 rebounds in five games played for the Kings.

On July 27, 2013, Clyburn signed with ratiopharm Ulm of the German BBL. Clyburn helped Ulm reach the 2014 Eurocup Round of 16, as well as the 2014 German Cup Finals, where they eventually lost to Alba Berlin.

On July 8, 2014, Clyburn joined the Los Angeles Clippers for the 2014 NBA Summer League.

On October 18, 2014, Clyburn recorded a double-double and season-highs of 28 points and 17 rebounds, shooting 9-of-18 from the field, in a 99–85 win over MHP Riesen Ludwigsburg. In 41 games played during the 2014–15 season, he averaged 12.9 points, 7.2 rebounds, 1.5 assists and 1.2 steals per game. His solid play for the season got him an invite to play in the German League All-Star Game. Clyburn led the team to reach the 2014 BBL Playoffs as the fifth seed, but they eventually were eliminated by Brose Bamberg in the Semifinals.

=== Hapoel Holon (2015–2016) ===
On September 8, 2015, Clyburn signed with Hapoel Holon in Israeli Premier League. On April 25, 2016, Clyburn recorded 31 points, shooting 11-of-15 from the field, along with nine rebounds and three assists for 43 PIR in a 98–80 win over Maccabi Ashdod. He was subsequently named Israeli League Round 30 MVP. On May 1, 2016, Clyburn was named Israeli League Player of the Month after averaging 25.6 points, 10.6 rebounds and 4 assists in five games played in April.

In 33 games played for Holon, Clyburn led the league in scoring with 20.9 points per game, to go with 8.2 rebounds, 2 assists and 1.4 steals per game. On June 3, 2016, Clyburn earned a spot in the All-Israeli League Second Team.

=== Darüşşafaka (2016–2017) ===
On August 5, 2016, Clyburn signed with Darüşşafaka of the Turkish Basketball Super League and the EuroLeague. On March 30, 2017, Clyburn recorded a season-high 26 points, shooting 9-of-14 from the field, along with seven rebounds in a 99–97 win over Brose Bamberg. Clyburn led Daçka to the 2017 EuroLeague Playoffs as the eighth seed, but they eventually were eliminated by Real Madrid in the Quarterfinals.

=== CSKA Moscow (2017–2022) ===
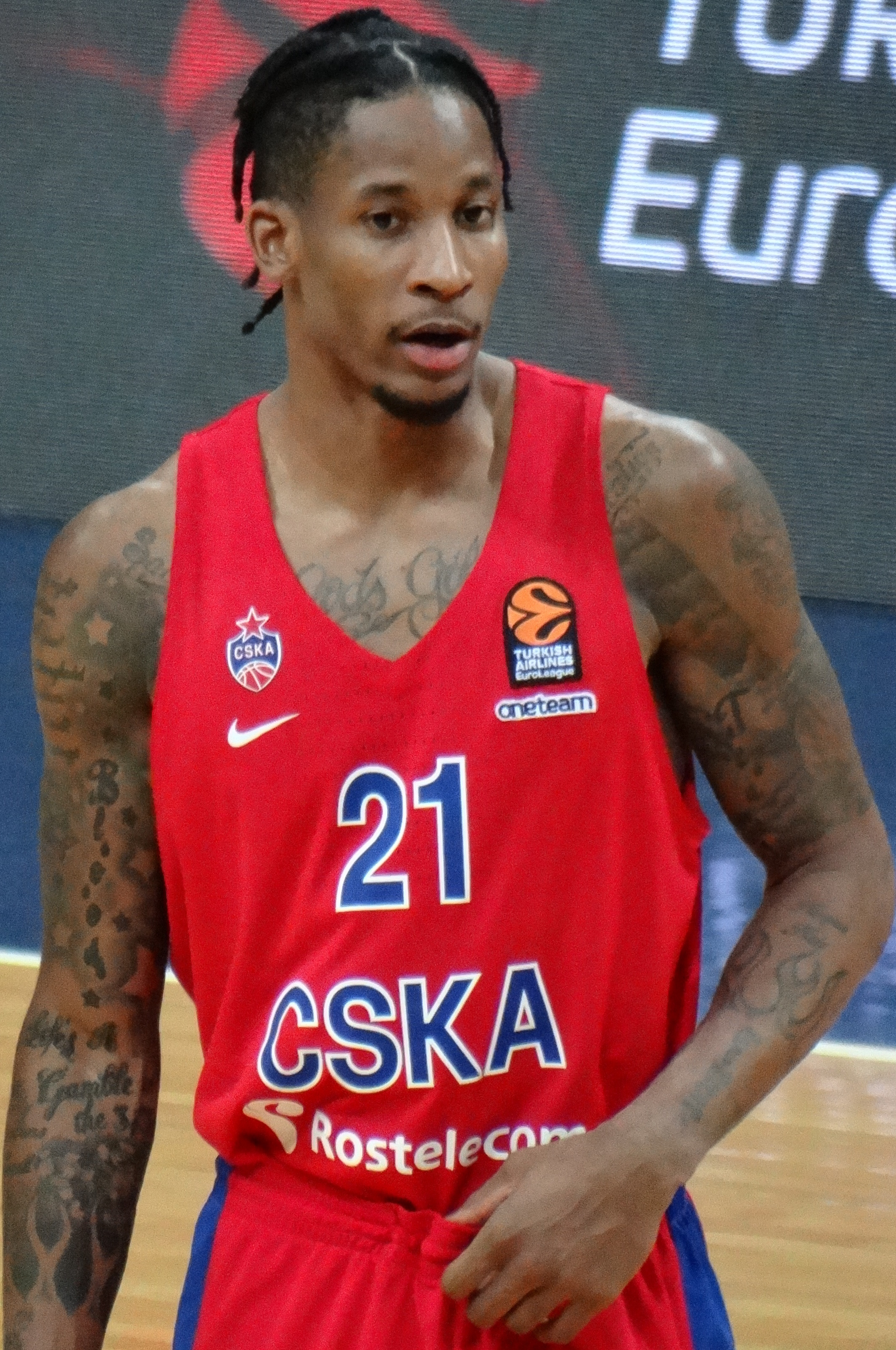
Clyburn with CSKA in 2018

On June 20, 2017, Clyburn signed a two-year contract with the Russian team CSKA Moscow of the VTB United League and the EuroLeague. In 64 games played during the 2017–18 season, he averaged 11.9 points, 5.2 rebounds and 1.7 assists per game. Clyburn helped CSKA win the 2018 VTB United League Championship, winning his first career title.

On January 17, 2019, Clyburn recorded 20 points, shooting 6-of-13 from the field, along with eight rebounds and two steals, leading CSKA to a 77–70 comeback win over FC Bayern Munich. Clyburn was named EuroLeague Round 19 MVP. On May 9, 2019, Clyburn was named to the All-EuroLeague First Team. On May 19, 2019, Clyburn led CSKA win the 2019 EuroLeague Championship after scoring 20 points in the championship game against Anadolu Efes. He was named the EuroLeague Final Four MVP.

On June 14, 2019, Clyburn signed a three-year contract extension with CSKA. On October 25, 2019, Clyburn was ruled out for the rest of the season after he suffered an ACL injury in a match against Alba Berlin.

=== Anadolu Efes (2022–2024) ===
On June 7, 2022, Clyburn signed a two-year contract with the Turkish club Anadolu Efes of the Basketbol Süper Ligi and the EuroLeague, the back-to-back European champions. On June 20, 2024, Clyburn parted ways with the Turkish powerhouse.

=== Virtus Bologna (2024–2025) ===
In the following year, Clyburn signed with Virtus Bologna of the Italian Lega Basket Serie A (LBA) and the EuroLeague. Virtus ended the EuroLeague at the 17th place, after a disappointing regular season. After arriving first in the national championship season, Virtus eliminated Venezia 3–2 and their arch-rival Milan 3–1, reaching their fifth finals in a row. They then defeated Brescia 3–0, claiming the Italian championship title for the 17th time.

=== FC Barcelona (2025–2026) ===
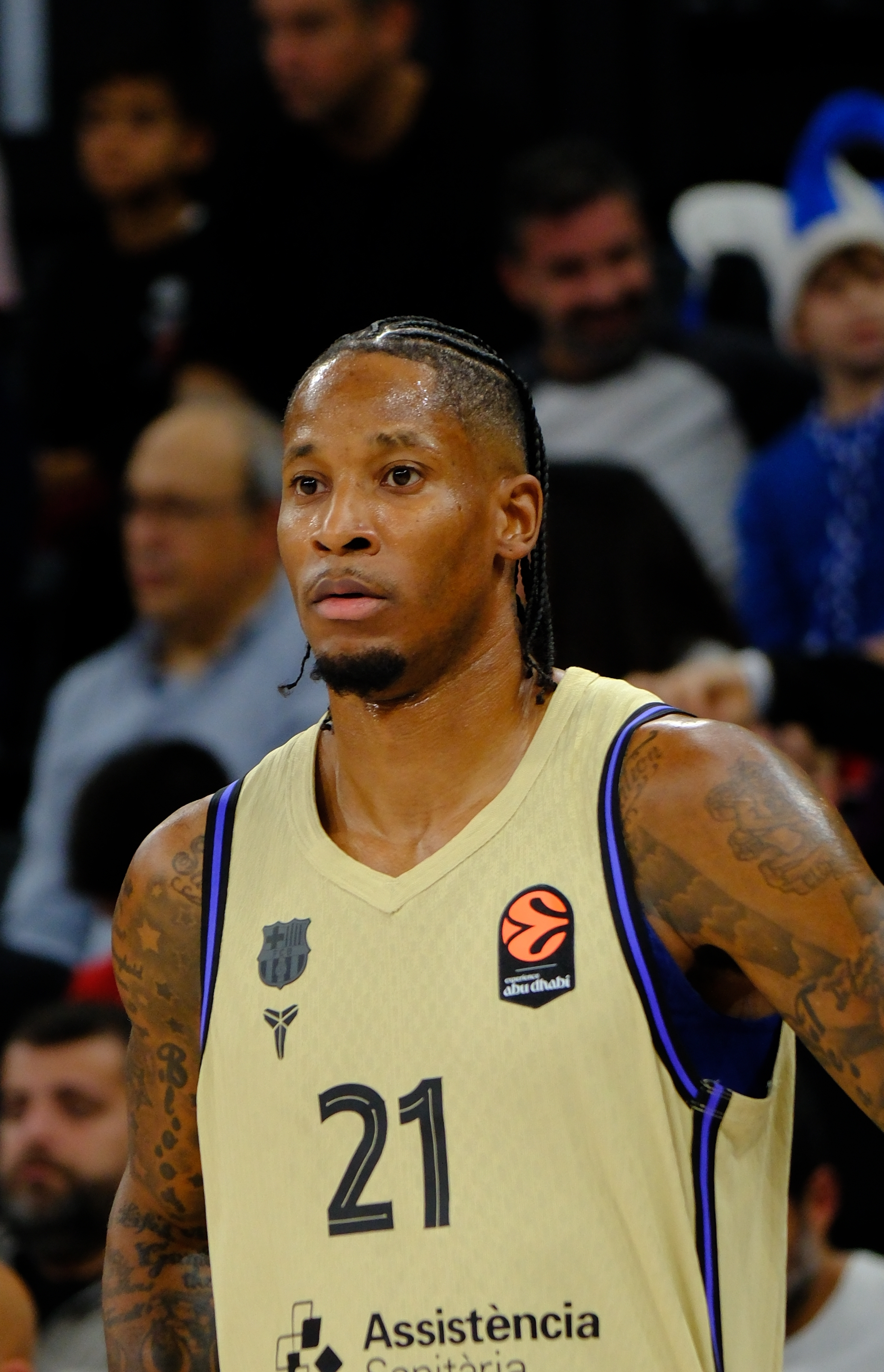
Clyburn with FC Barcelona in 2025

On July 23, 2025, Clyburn was announced as a new FC Barcelona player, signing a two season contract with the Catalans. In December 2025, Clyburn suffered a left leg hamstring injury with a recovery time of about six weeks. He had been averaging 14.4 points, 4.2 rebounds, and 1.4 assists per game in EuroLeague. Clyburn returned to action on round 25 of the EuroLeauge, in January 2026. On July 4, 2026, Barcelona parted ways with Clyburn.

=== Fenerbahçe (2026–present) ===
On July 17, 2026, Clyburn signed one-year deal with Fenerbahçe of the Turkish Basketbol Süper Ligi (BSL).

== Personal life ==
Clyburn's younger brother, Kris (born April 20, 1996) is also a professional basketball player, who currently plays for Gravelines in the French Pro A league.

== Career statistics ==
Legend
GP	Games played	GS	Games started	MPG	Minutes per game
FG%	Field-goal percentage	3P%	3-point field-goal percentage	FT%	Free-throw percentage
RPG	Rebounds per game	APG	Assists per game	SPG	Steals per game
BPG	Blocks per game	PPG	Points per game	PIR	Performance index rating
**Bold**	Career high

=== EuroLeague ===
†	Denotes season in which Clyburn won the EuroLeague
*	Led the league

Year	Team	GP	GS	MPG	FG%	3P%	FT%	RPG	APG	SPG	BPG	PPG	PIR
2016–17	Darüşşafaka	34	26	28.1	.429	.289	.685	5.1	1.3	.9	**.3**	13.0	12.3
2017–18	CSKA Moscow	**36***	13	26.5	.435	.386	.692	5.9	1.8	.9	**.3**	11.6	13.6
2018–19†	CSKA Moscow	35	13	27.0	.474	.343	.745	**6.8**	1.5	1.0	.2	13.6	17.5
2019–20	CSKA Moscow	4	0	19.3	**.500**	.364	.727	5.3	.8	.8	—	12.5	12.8
2020–21	CSKA Moscow	31	2	26.3	.454	.364	.796	3.8	1.5	.8	.2	14.0	14.3
2021–22	CSKA Moscow	20	1	28.2	.391	.333	.886	5.2	1.7	.7	**.3**	14.9	15.2
2022–23	Anadolu Efes	34	17	**33.1***	.436	.366	.830	5.7	2.1	1.0	.2	**16.7**	**18.6**
2023–24	Anadolu Efes	25	18	28.3	.429	.331	.787	4.6	2.0	1.0	.2	13.3	14.7
2024–25	Virtus Bologna	24	24	27.4	.436	.341	.817	4.7	**2.4**	**1.1**	.2	13.8	13.8
2025–26	Barcelona	33	**29**	25.3	.463	**.387**	.726	4.2	1.6	**1.1**	.2	13.8	14.7
2026–27	Fenerbahçe	11	0	21.8	.374	.351	**.900**	2.6	1.6	.9	.4	10.2	10.1
Career		287	143	27.5	.439	.353	.767	5.1	1.7	.9	.2	13.6	14.9

=== EuroCup ===
Year	Team	GP	GS	MPG	FG%	3P%	FT%	RPG	APG	SPG	BPG	PPG	PIR
2013–14	ratiopharm Ulm	18	3	22.1	.430	.238	.786	4.2	1.4	.2	.3	8.5	9.4
Career		18	3	22.1	.430	.238	.786	4.2	1.4	.2	.3	8.5	9.4

=== FIBA EuroChallenge ===
Year	Team	GP	GS	MPG	FG%	3P%	FT%	RPG	APG	SPG	BPG	PPG
2014–15	ratiopharm Ulm	6	6	26.8	.433	.308	.680	6.5	1.3	.7	.8	12.2
Career		6	6	26.8	.433	.308	.680	6.5	1.3	.7	.8	12.2

=== Domestic leagues ===
Year	Team	League	GP	MPG	FG%	3P%	FT%	RPG	APG	SPG	BPG	PPG
2013–14	(Germany) ratiopharm Ulm	BBL	38	22.3	.412	.258	.767	4.4	1.4	.8	.2	8.8
2014–15	(Germany) ratiopharm Ulm	BBL	41	30.0	.477	.272	.759	7.2	1.6	1.2	.3	13.0
2015–16	(Israel) Hapoel Holon	Ligat HaAl	33	36.1	.456	.333	.660	8.3	2.0	1.4	.4	20.9
2016–17	(Turkey) Darüşşafaka	TBSL	31	26.9	.440	.316	.701	5.6	1.5	.7	.2	10.8
2017–18	(Russia) CSKA Moscow	VTBUL	28	23.0	.532	.441	.710	4.5	1.7	.6	.5	12.4
2018–19	(Russia) CSKA Moscow	VTBUL	27	21.6	.517	.302	.778	4.8	1.6	.7	.4	10.6
2019–20	(Russia) CSKA Moscow	VTBUL	3	20.5	.500	.583	.538	4.7	1.0	1.3	.3	15.3
2020–21	(Russia) CSKA Moscow	VTBUL	26	25.3	.450	.383	.705	3.5	2.5	1.0	.3	13.9
2021–22	(Russia) CSKA Moscow	VTBUL	16	25.7	.387	.292	.783	3.6	1.5	.6	.4	12.5
2023–24	(Turkey) Anadolu Efes	TBSL	34	30.2	.461	.384	.794	5.9	2.5	1.2	.2	14.5
2023–24	(Turkey) Anadolu Efes	TBSL	19	27.9	.410	.274	.744	5.1	3.2	1.0	.1	10.8
2024–25	(Italy) Virtus Bologna	LBA	27	24.2	.407	.261	.738	3.7	2.5	1.1	.1	11.0
2025–26	(Spain) Barcelona	ACB	31	24.0	.466	.414	.756	3.9	1.3	1.0	.2	12.0

=== College ===
Year	Team	GP	GS	MPG	FG%	3P%	FT%	RPG	APG	SPG	BPG	PPG
2010–11	Utah	30	28	**34.7**	**.450**	**.403**	.759	**7.8**	1.0	**1.1**	.2	**17.1**
2012–13	Iowa State	**35**	**35**	31.5	.443	.308	**.768**	6.8	**2.1**	.9	**.4**	14.9
Career		65	63	33.0	.446	.359	.764	7.3	1.6	1.0	.3	15.9
