= John Holifield =

American football player (born 1964)

No. 40
- Position: Running back

Personal information
- Born: July 14, 1964; Romulus, Michigan, U.S.
- Listed height: 6 ft 0 in (1.83 m)
- Listed weight: 202 lb (92 kg)

Career information
- High school: Romulus
- College: West Virginia
- NFL draft: 1987: 12th round, 328th overall pick

Career history
- Cincinnati Bengals (1987–1989)

Career NFL statistics
- Rushing yards: 20
- Rushing average: 1.8
- Receptions: 2
- Receiving yards: 18
- Stats at Pro Football Reference

Johnathan Mark Holifield (born July 14, 1964) is an American former professional football player who was a running back for the Cincinnati Bengals of the National Football League (NFL). He played college football for the West Virginia Mountaineers.

== Football career ==
=== High school ===
Holifield played high school football at Romulus High School in Romulus, Michigan.

=== College ===
Holifield arrived at West Virginia in 1983. During his first two seasons as a Mountaineer, 1983 and 1984, Holifield accumulated 388 yards and 5 touchdowns.

Holifield earned the starting running back job in 1984, as a junior. He rushed for 595 yards and 6 touchdowns, along with a receiving score, that season. In 1986, Holifield was elected team captain and totaled his best season statistically. He rushed for 645 yards and 3 touchdowns his final season as a Mountaineer.

=== Professional ===
Pre-draft measurables
Height	Weight	Arm length	Hand span	40-yard dash	10-yard split	20-yard split	20-yard shuttle	Vertical jump	Broad jump	Bench press
5 ft 11 1/8 in (1.81 m)	208 lb (94 kg)	31 in (0.79 m)	9 1/4 in (0.23 m)	4.55 s	1.58 s	2.62 s	4.15 s	30.5 in (0.77 m)	9 ft 7 in (2.92 m)	14 reps
All values from NFL Combine

Holifield was selected in the 12th round of the 1987 NFL Draft by the Cincinnati Bengals with the 328th overall pick. He was a member of the AFC Champion Cincinnati Bengals in 1988 and played three games for the Cincinnati Bengals in the 1989 season. He was released in 1990.

== After football ==
Having received a bachelor's degree in political science in 1987, Holifield earned a Juris Doctor degree from the University of Cincinnati College of Law in 1996. He practiced law for five years, as a prosecutor in Cincinnati and in private practice by 1999. Afterwards, Holifield became involved in economic development.

In 2006, Holifield became CEO of the Olmsted Parks Conservancy in Buffalo, New York. In 2007, Holifield was picked to lead the Urban League of Greater Cleveland.

On September 18, 2017, Holifield was named executive director of the White House initiative on historically black colleges and universities.
