= Garden City, Michigan =

- City
- City of Garden City
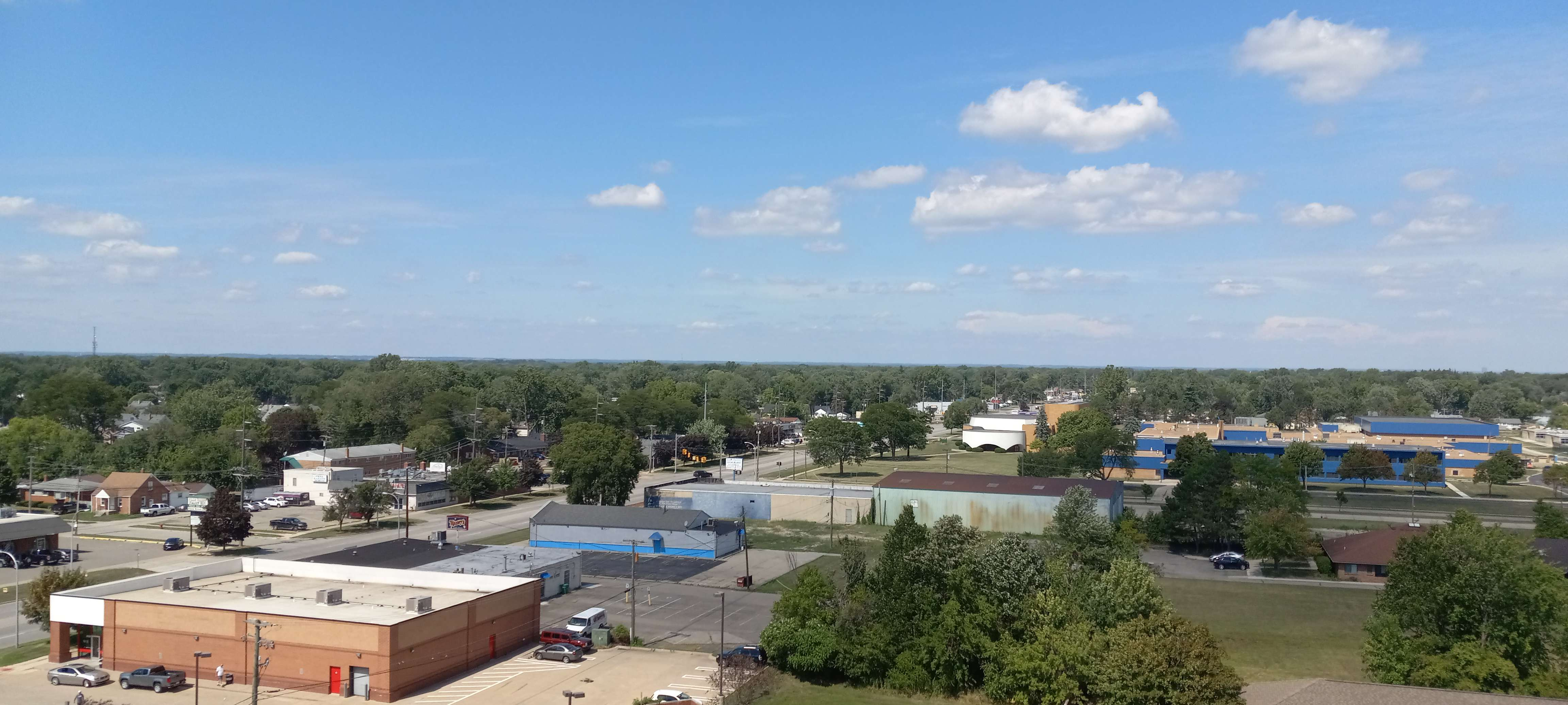
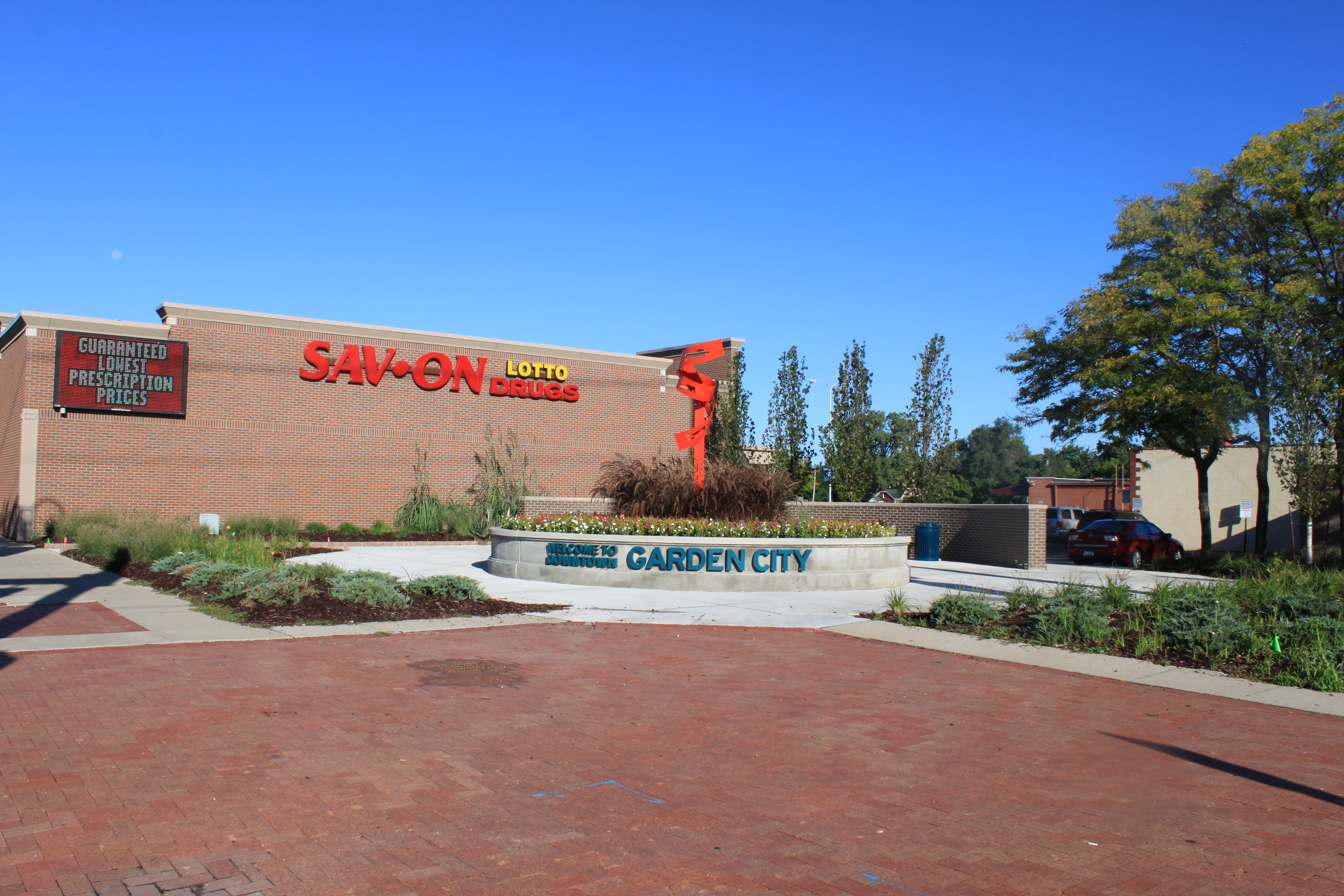
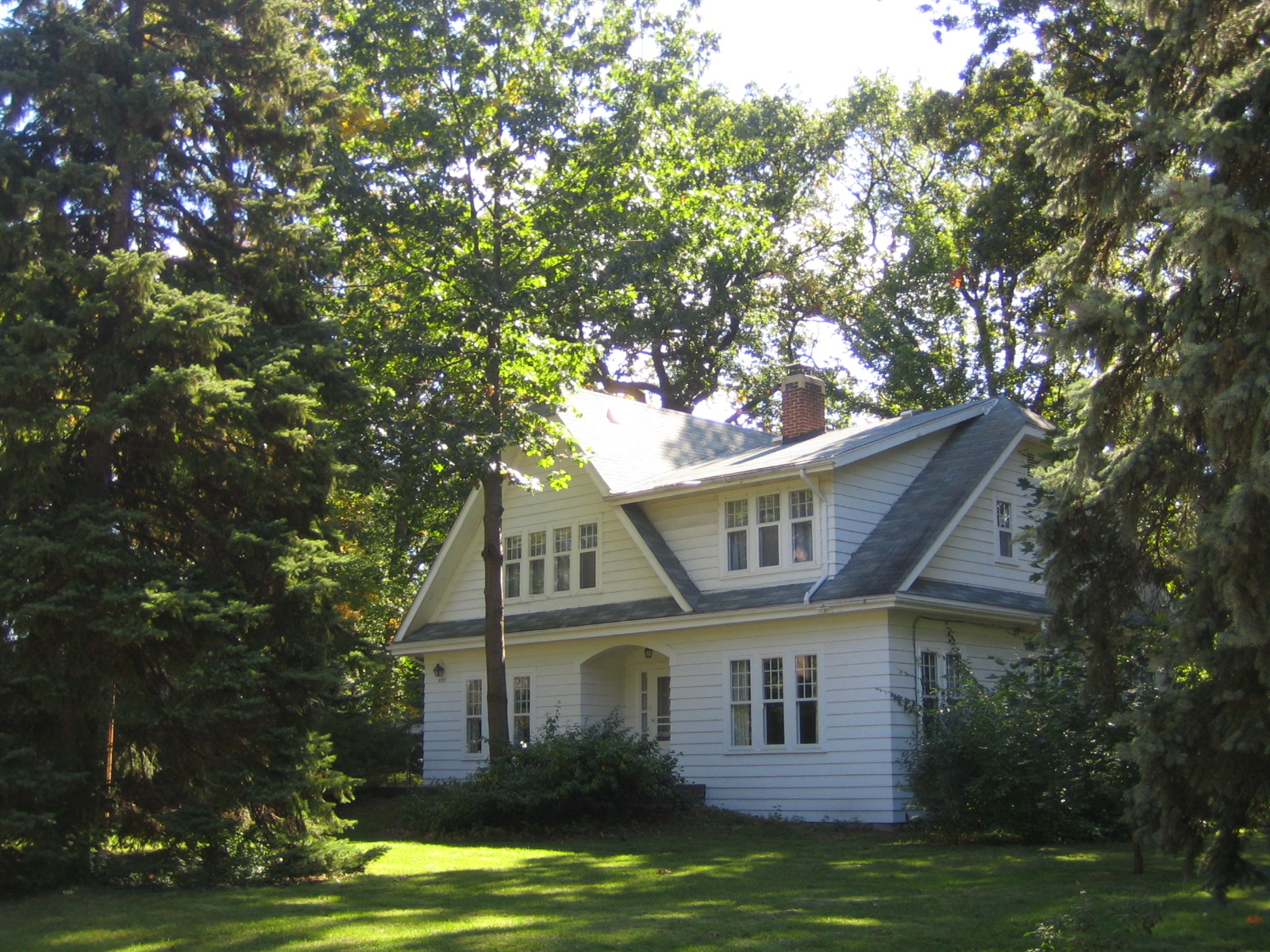
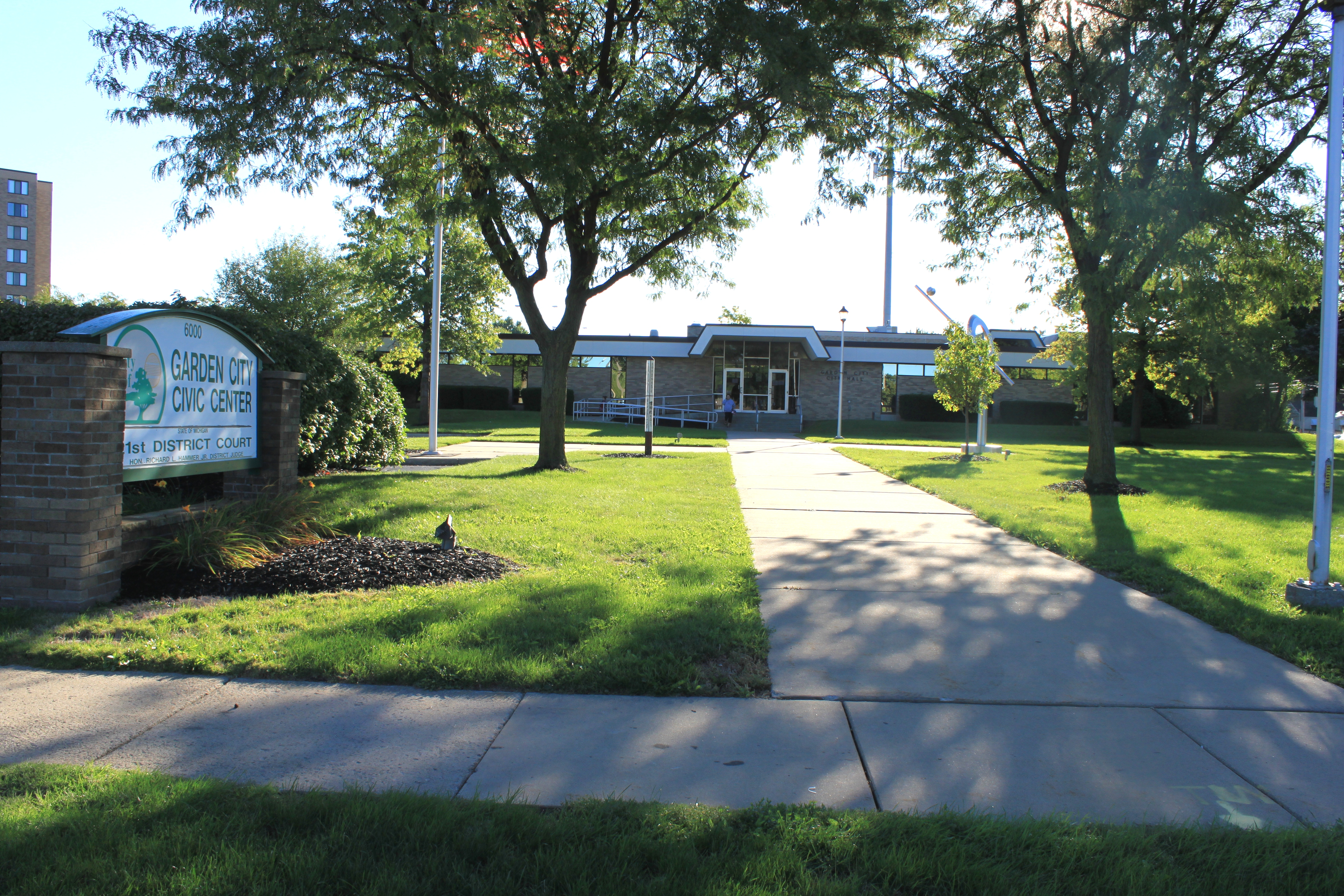
- Clockwise: Aerial view of Garden City, Downtown Welcome sign, Former Arnold Folker residence, Garden City City Hall

- Logo

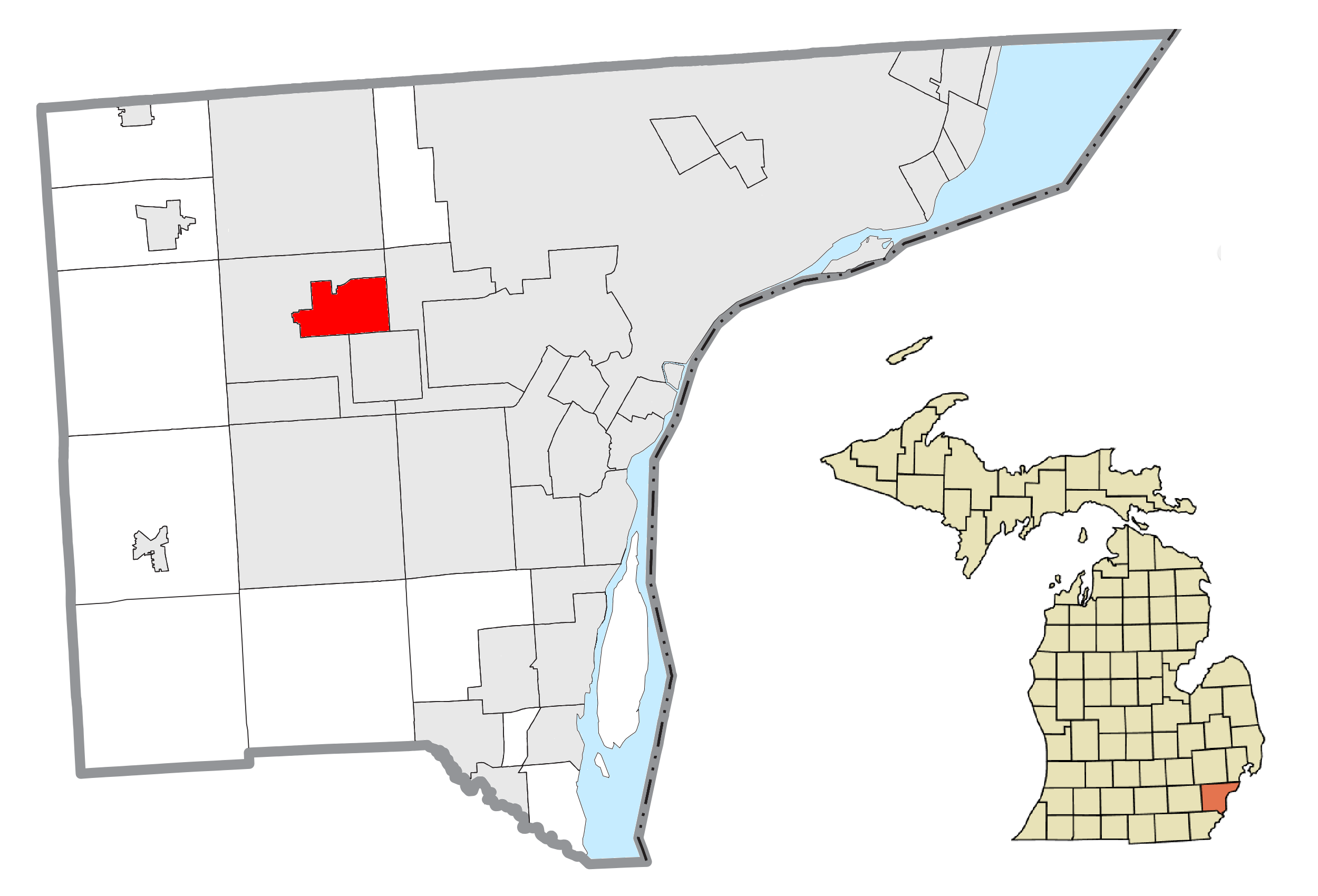
- Location within Wayne County

- Location within the State of Michigan
- Coordinates: 42°19′28″N 83°20′18″W
- Country: United States
- State: Michigan
- County: Wayne
- Incorporated: 1927 (village); 1933 (city)

Government
  - Type: Mayor–council
  - Mayor: Mark Jacobs
  - City Manager: Tim Gibbons
  - Clerk: Bryan Smith

Area
  - City: 5.86 sq mi (15.18 km^{2})
  - Land: 5.86 sq mi (15.18 km^{2})
  - Water: 0 sq mi (0.00 km^{2})
- Elevation: 633 ft (193 m)

Population (2020)
  - City: 27,380
  - Density: 4,670.3/sq mi (1,803.21/km^{2})
  - Metro: 4,285,832 (Metro Detroit)
- Time zone: UTC-5 (EST)
  - Summer (DST): UTC-4 (EDT)
- ZIP code(s): 48135, 48136
- Area code: 734
- FIPS code: 26-31420
- GNIS feature ID: 0626632
- Website: www.gardencitymi.org

Garden City is a city in Wayne County of the U.S. state of Michigan. A western suburb of Detroit, Garden City is located roughly 15 miles (24 km) west of downtown Detroit. As of the 2020 census, the city had a population of 27,380. Garden City is notable as the home of the first locations of Kmart and Little Caesars.

== History ==
The origins of Garden City started with the transfer of the property to John Lathers from Andrew Jackson for 160 acres (0.65 km^{2}) in October 1835. The city was patterned after the "garden city" concept that became popular in England during the 19th century, with most home sites sectioned off into 1-acre (4,000 m^{2}) plots to allow adequate farming area to support the family with fruit and vegetables. Most sites are now considerably smaller, some as small as 40 feet by 135 feet, with little room for gardening of fruits and vegetables, though the city maintains some large lots where an extra street has not been placed between two of the older streets, such as between some parts of Bock Street and John Hauk Street where Donnelly Avenue does not cut through.

In June 1927, Garden City became a village within Nankin Township, with Arnold Folker as Village President. Six years later the village became the city of Garden City. Areas of interest in Garden City include the first Kmart store (opened in 1962, closed in early 2017, now demolished), the first Little Caesars (opened in May 1959, closed in October 2018), located at 32594 Cherry Hill Road, and the first dine-in McDonald's in Michigan. The Folker Building, a gray stone structure located at the southeast corner of Ford and Middlebelt Roads, at what is considered downtown Garden City, was the first city hall. It later contained Orin Jewelers and other retail establishments. A new city hall was eventually constructed on Middlebelt Road between Ford and Warren Roads. The honeymoon cottage of Henry Ford and his wife, Clara Jane Bryant, was moved here from Dearborn in 1952.

== Geography ==
According to the United States Census Bureau, the city has a total area of 5.87 square miles (15.20 km^{2}), all land.

== Demographics ==
Historical population
Census	Pop.	Note	%±
1930	2,081		—
1940	4,096		96.8%
1950	9,012		120.0%
1960	38,017		321.8%
1970	41,864		10.1%
1980	35,640		−14.9%
1990	31,846		−10.6%
2000	30,047		−5.6%
2010	27,692		−7.8%
2020	27,380		−1.1%
U.S. Decennial Census

=== Racial and ethnic composition ===
Garden City city, Michigan – Racial and ethnic composition Note: the US Census treats Hispanic/Latino as an ethnic category. This table excludes Latinos from the racial categories and assigns them to a separate category. Hispanics/Latinos may be of any race.
Race / Ethnicity (NH = Non-Hispanic)	Pop 2000	Pop 2010	Pop 2020	% 2000	% 2010	% 2020
White alone (NH)	28,438	24,977	22,589	94.65%	90.20%	82.50%
Black or African American alone (NH)	330	928	1,621	1.10%	3.35%	5.92%
Native American or Alaska Native alone (NH)	112	113	96	0.37%	0.41%	0.35%
Asian alone (NH)	211	232	306	0.70%	0.84%	1.12%
Native Hawaiian or Pacific Islander alone (NH)	1	4	6	0.00%	0.01%	0.02%
Other race alone (NH)	10	30	90	0.03%	0.11%	0.33%
Mixed race or Multiracial (NH)	334	505	1,479	1.11%	1.82%	5.40%
Hispanic or Latino (any race)	611	903	1,193	2.03%	3.26%	4.36%
Total	30,047	27,692	27,380	100.00%	100.00%	100.00%

=== 2020 census ===
As of the 2020 census, Garden City had a population of 27,380. The median age was 40.8 years. 19.2% of residents were under the age of 18 and 16.0% of residents were 65 years of age or older. For every 100 females there were 100.0 males, and for every 100 females age 18 and over there were 99.4 males age 18 and over.

100.0% of residents lived in urban areas, while 0.0% lived in rural areas.

There were 11,239 households in Garden City, of which 27.2% had children under the age of 18 living in them. Of all households, 42.0% were married-couple households, 22.1% were households with a male householder and no spouse or partner present, and 27.4% were households with a female householder and no spouse or partner present. About 28.9% of all households were made up of individuals and 11.6% had someone living alone who was 65 years of age or older.

There were 11,669 housing units, of which 3.7% were vacant. The homeowner vacancy rate was 1.2% and the rental vacancy rate was 4.1%.

Racial composition as of the 2020 census
Race	Number	Percent
White	23,006	84.0%
Black or African American	1,660	6.1%
American Indian and Alaska Native	112	0.4%
Asian	306	1.1%
Native Hawaiian and Other Pacific Islander	6	0.0%
Some other race	302	1.1%
Two or more races	1,988	7.3%

=== 2010 census ===
As of the census of 2010, there were 27,692 people, 10,894 households, and 7,383 families living in the city. The population density was 4,717.5 inhabitants per square mile (1,821.4/km^{2}). There were 11,616 housing units at an average density of 1,978.9 per square mile (764.1/km^{2}). The racial makeup of the city was 92.5% White, 3.4% African American, 0.4% Native American, 0.8% Asian, 0.8% from other races, and 2.1% from two or more races. Hispanic or Latino residents of any race were 3.3% of the population.

There were 10,894 households, of which 31.7% had children under the age of 18 living with them, 48.2% were married couples living together, 13.6% had a female householder with no husband present, 6.0% had a male householder with no wife present, and 32.2% were non-families. 26.8% of all households were made up of individuals, and 10.7% had someone living alone who was 65 years of age or older. The average household size was 2.54 and the average family size was 3.07.

The median age in the city was 39.9 years. 22.4% of residents were under the age of 18; 8.5% were between the ages of 18 and 24; 26.5% were from 25 to 44; 28.6% were from 45 to 64; and 14% were 65 years of age or older. The gender makeup of the city was 49.1% male and 50.9% female.

=== 2000 census ===
As of the census of 2000, there were 30,047 people, 11,479 households, and 8,230 families living in the city. The population density was 5,124.0 inhabitants per square mile (1,978.4/km^{2}). There were 11,719 housing units at an average density of 1,998.5 per square mile (771.6/km^{2}). The racial makeup of the city was 96.20% White, 1.10% African-American, 0.40% Native American, 0.72% Asian, 0.01% Pacific Islander, 0.30% from other races, and 1.27% from two or more races. Hispanic or Latino residents of any race were 2.03% of the population.

There were 11,479 households, out of which 32.5% had children under the age of 18 living with them, 56.0% were married couples living together, 11.2% had a female householder with no husband present, and 28.3% were non-families. 24.0% of all households were made up of individuals, and 9.7% had someone living alone who was 65 years of age or older. The average household size was 2.62 and the average family size was 3.11.

In the city, 25.1% of the population was under the age of 18, 7.6% was from 18 to 24, 32.6% from 25 to 44, 21.2% from 45 to 64, and 13.5% was 65 years of age or older. The median age was 36 years. For every 100 females, there were 97.4 males. For every 100 females age 18 and over, there were 95.5 males.

The median income for a household in the city was $51,841, and the median income for a family was $58,530. Males had a median income of $44,314 versus $27,904 for females. The per capita income for the city was $21,651. About 3.3% of families and 4.5% of the population were below the poverty line, including 4.2% of those under age 18 and 6.5% of those age 65 or over.

== Education ==
The main source of education for Garden City is their school district, Garden City School District, which includes four elementary schools, one middle school, one public high school which also houses a performing arts center and a swimming pool, and an alternative education high school called Cambridge High School. During the baby boom, a second high school was constructed, Garden City West High School, with teams called the Tigers. At that time, Garden City High School, whose teams had the name the Panthers, was renamed Garden City High School - East. After the census at both schools declined, Garden City West became Garden City Middle School with the four middle schools from the baby boom being dissolved. These middle schools were Burger, Radcliff, Vogel, and Cambridge. Burger Middle School became Burger School for Students with Autism, which has been renamed to Burger Baylor School, while still being under the authority of Garden City Public Schools. Radcliff Middle School became a satellite campus for Schoolcraft College; the school has since sold Radcliff Center to the City for their Parks and Recreation Department. The former middle school and Schoolcraft campus are located directly next to the current Garden City Middle School. Vogel has since been razed, while Cambridge now serves as the district's alternative high school. After the dissolution of the two high schools, Garden City East resumed the name Garden City High School, with teams now called the Cougars. Tipton Academy, at the old Florence Elementary building, a charter school serving grades PK-7, is also located in Garden City.

St. Raphael Catholic School in Garden City closed in 2016.
