= Romulus Senior High School =

High school in Romulus, Wayne County, Michigan

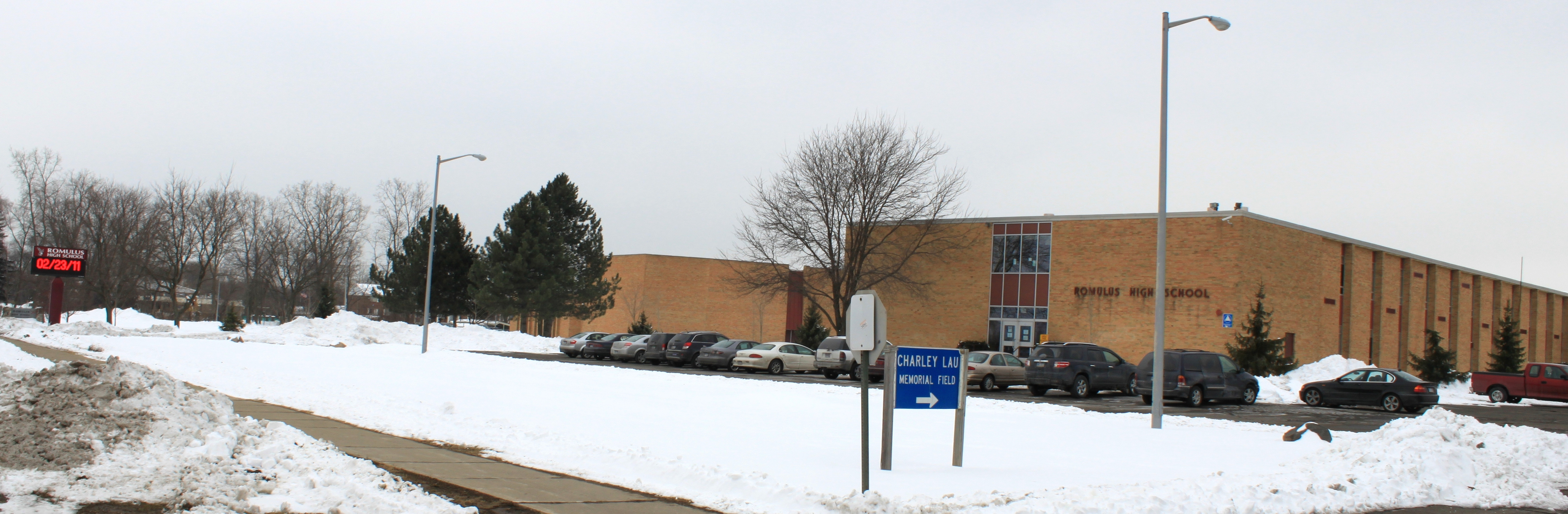

Location
- 9650 South Wayne Road; Romulus, Michigan 48174; United States; 42°13′59″N 83°23′17″W

Information
- Type: Public secondary
- Motto: "Making Our Best Even Better"
- Established: 1916
- School district: Romulus Community School District
- Superintendent: Benjamin P. Edmondson
- Principal: Seth Petty
- Teaching staff: 30.50 (on an FTE basis)
- Grades: 9–12
- Enrollment: 518 (2024–2025)
- Student to teacher ratio: 16.98
- Colors: Maroon and White
- Athletics conference: Western Wayne Athletic Conference
- Nickname: Eagles
- Rival: Belleville High School
- Accreditation: North Central Association of Colleges and Schools
- Newspaper: The Wingspan
- Website: rhs.romulusk12.org

Student assessments
- 2021–22 school year Change vs. prior year

M-STEP 11th grade proficiency rates (Science / Social Studies)
- Advanced %: 6.3 / ≤5
- Proficient %: 11.0 / –
- PR. Proficient %: 11.0 / 59.5
- Not Proficient %: 71.7 / 21.4

Average test scores
- SAT Total: 827.6 (▼ −15.9)

Romulus Senior High School or Romulus High School is the public high school in the city of Romulus, Michigan in Metro Detroit.

== History ==
In 2013 Inkster High School closed due to the closure of the Inkster School District. Students in the Inkster zone south of Michigan Avenue and west of Middlebelt were rezoned to Romulus High School. This area includes portions of Inkster and Westland.

== Demographics ==
The demographic breakdown of the 518 students enrolled in 2024-2025 was:

- Male - 51.9%
- Female - 48.1%
- Black - 76.2%
- White - 14.3%
- Multiracial - 4.8%
- Hispanic - 3.9%
- American Indian/ Alaska Native - 0.6%
- Asian - 0.2%

73.8% of the students were eligible for free or reduced-cost lunch.

== Athletics ==
The following sports are offered at RHS. Unless noted there are teams for both sexes:

- Baseball (boys)
- Basketball
  - Boys state champion - 1986, 2013
- Bowling
- Cross Country
- Competitive Cheerleading (girls)
- Football (boys)
- Golf (boys)
- Soccer
- Softball (girls)
- Tennis (girls)
- Track & Field
  - Boys state champion - 2000
  - Girls state champion - 2009
- Volleyball (girls)
- Wrestling (boys)

The Romulus High School Eagles has a longtime rivalry with the Belleville High School Tigers.

== Notable people ==
- Wes Clark, professional basketball player
- Kris Clyburn, professional basketball player, Israeli Premier League
- Will Clyburn, professional basketball player, 2016 top scorer in the Israel Basketball Premier League, 2019 EuroLeague Final Four MVP
- Shaler Halimon, professional basketball player
- Charlie Henry, former assistant basketball coach at Romulus, college and professional basketball coach.
- John Holifield, professional football player
- Jaren Holmes, professional basketball player
- Robert Lambert, Daytime Emmy Award-winning casting director for Days of Our Lives.
- Charley Lau, professional baseball player and coach
- Grant Long, professional basketball player
- John Long, professional basketball player
- Terry Mills, professional basketball player
- Nate Oats, former head basketball coach and teacher at Romulus, current head basketball coach at University of Alabama.
- Devin Searcy, basketball player
