= Orion Academy =

Orion Academy may refer to:

- Orion Academy (Cincinnati) in Cincinnati, Ohio, United States
- Orion Academy (California) in Moraga, California, United States
- Orion Academy, a school in Oxford, England (List of schools in Oxfordshire)
