= Garden City High School (Michigan) =

High school in Garden City, Wayne County, Michigan

Location
- 6500 Middlebelt Road; Garden City, Michigan 48135; United States; 42.3344°N 83.33°W

Information
- Type: Public secondary school
- Opened: 1950
- School district: Garden City School District
- Superintendent: Derek Fisher
- Principal: Sharon Kollar
- Staff: 48.00 (FTE)
- Grades: 9-12
- Enrollment: 857 (2023-2024)
- Student to teacher ratio: 17.85
- Colors: Royal blue and orange
- Fight song: GCHS Fight Song (On, Wisconsin melody)
- Athletics conference: Western Wayne Athletic Conference
- Nickname: Cougars
- Newspaper: Cougar Tracks
- Website: gchs.gardencityschools.com

Student assessments
- 2021–22 school year Change vs. prior year

M-STEP 11th grade proficiency rates (Science / Social Studies)
- Advanced %: 10.0 / 7.6
- Proficient %: 22.4 / 24.7
- PR. Proficient %: 17.6 / 52.4
- Not Proficient %: 50.0 / 15.3

Average test scores
- SAT Total: 908.7 (▼ −18.2)

Garden City High School is a public high school located in Garden City, Michigan, United States.

== History ==
=== 1950–1964 ===
The first classes began in the fall of 1950 and the first graduating class was in spring 1952. The school mascot was the Panther and the school colors were Royal Blue and Gray, as indicated in the school's 1st year book (The Blue And Gray, 1952). The colors of Royal Blue, Gray and/or White also were in use.

=== 1964–1982 ===
By the early 1960s Garden City had grown to the point it needed a second high school, and West Senior High School was constructed and opened in 1964. It was nicknamed Garden City West. At this point in time, Garden City High School began going by the nickname Garden City East.

=== 1982–present ===
Garden City High School (the current location of Garden City High School) and West Senior High School (the current location of Garden City Middle School) consolidated during the 1982-1983 school year, and no longer went by the nicknames Garden City "East" and "Garden City" West. Prior to this consolidation, Garden City High School was known as the Panthers with the colors Royal Blue and Gray (and/or White). West Senior High School was known as the Tigers and were Black and Orange. When the 2 schools consolidated, the first graduating class chose the new colors and mascot. The seniors coming from West Senior High School chose the mascot (the Cougar) and the seniors from Garden City High School chose the colors (Royal Blue and Orange). The senior classes went from approximately 300 students at each school, to a total of a little over 600 students in the graduating class of 1983. In 2008, Garden City High School made the decision to switch to the trimester academic system, which saw advantages as well as disadvantages. In 2015, the Garden City School Board made the decision to switch back to the traditional semester system for the 2015-2016 school year and beyond.
