= RKA Petroleum Companies =

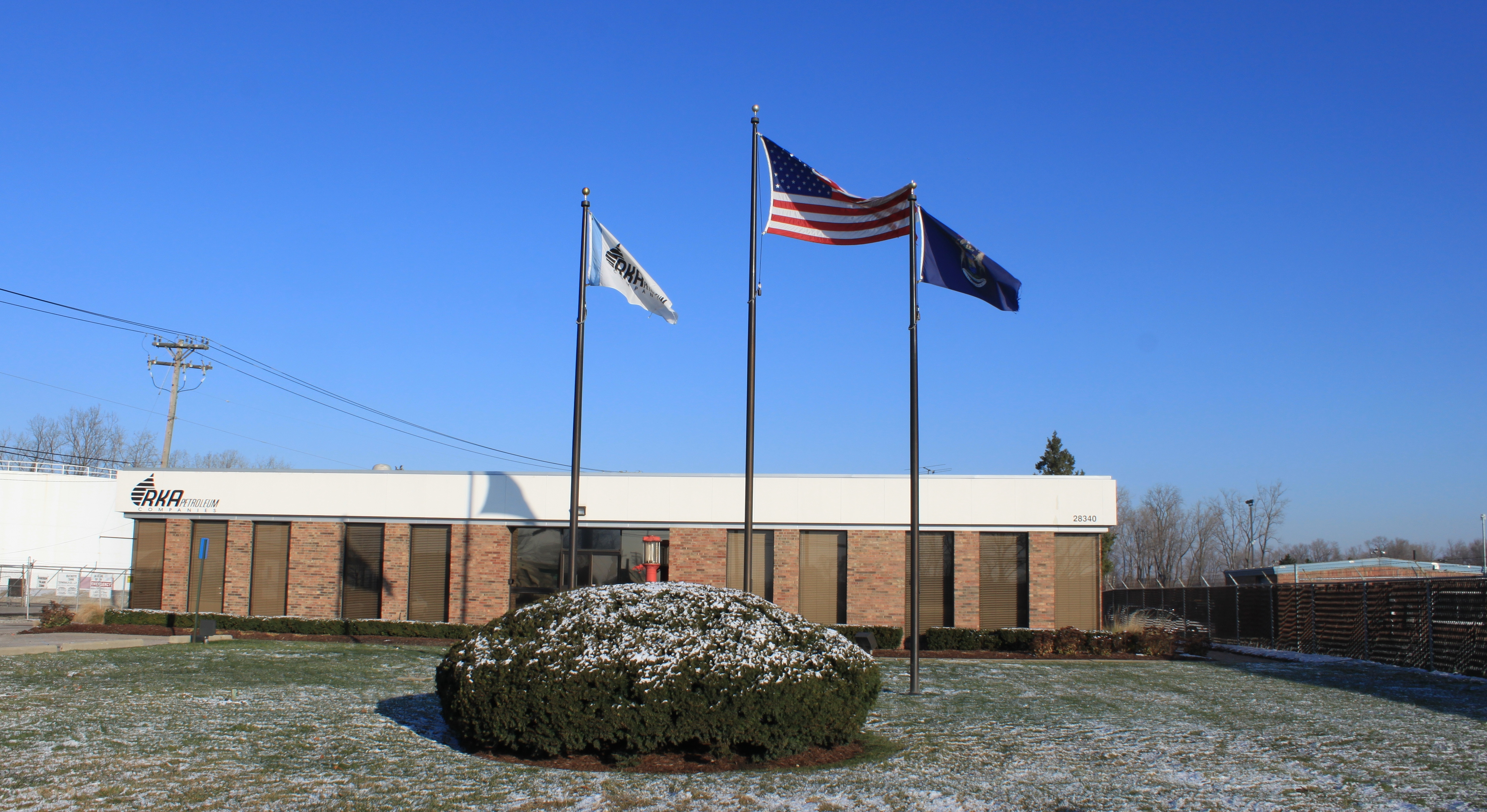
RKA Headquarters Building, Romulus

RKA Petroleum Companies, formerly Leemon Oil Co, is a family-owned and operated corporation based in Romulus, Michigan. The company specializes in gasoline, commercial fuels, governmental fuels, industrial and specialty fuels, E85, Ethanol, and Biodiesel and currently operates in over 24 states across the United States. Its reported revenue was $613.8 million by 2015.
