= Inkster Public Schools =

School District of the City of Inkster
- defunct school district tax-collecting unit
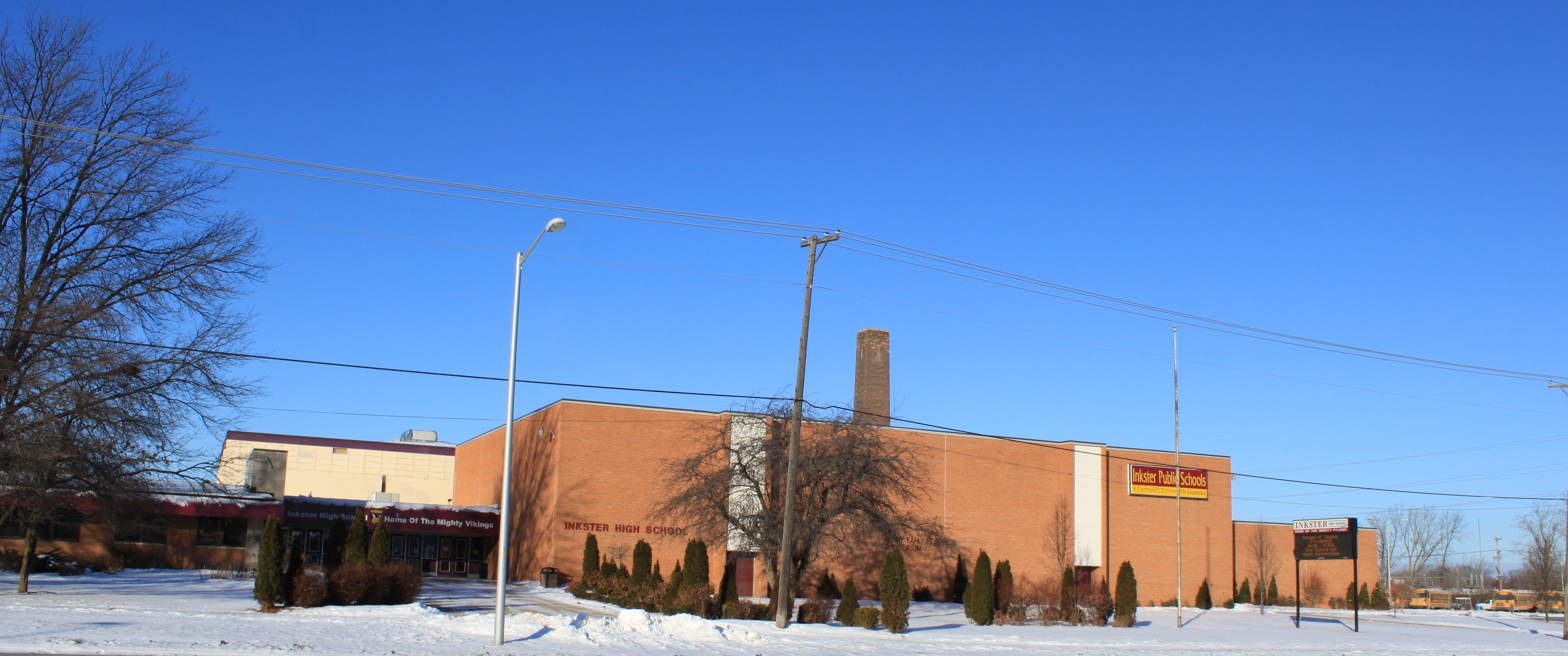
- Inkster High School

- Seal
- Country: USA
- State: Michigan
- Intermediate School District: WAYNE RESA

Inkster Public Schools (IPS), officially School District of the City of Inkster, was a school district headquartered in Inkster, Michigan in Metro Detroit. It served most of Inkster and a small portion of Westland.

== History ==
For a several-year period ending in 2013, the district had declining enrollment. In the 2012–2013 school year the district lost over 500 students. As of 2013, the district had a $12 million deficit. To deal with the deficit, the district proposed converting Inkster High School into a charter school and only directly operating the K-8 schools.

=== Closure ===
In June 2013 Governor of Michigan Rick Snyder and the Michigan Legislature approved Public Act 96 and 97 of 2013. The two bills were written specifically to close Inkster Public Schools and Buena Vista School District. The laws gave Andy Dillon, the Michigan Treasurer, and Mike Flanagan, the State Superintendent of Education, the power to formally determine if the districts would remain open for the 2013–2014 school year. They told the districts that they had one final opportunity to remain open if they secured outside funding but neither received a financing agreement. The deadline was July 22, 2013. The Inkster District claims that a deficit reduction plan was filed with the state and Comerica Bank would have made a loan contingent on approval of the plan. The plan was only rejected based on the official "lacks confidence that the District can implement" it.

Therefore, the Inkster Public Schools district was entirely dissolved. The district had a $15 million deficit at the time of closure.

The Wayne RESA Board of Education opted to make redistricting plans instead of allowing the state government to make the plans. The remaining students were split up among the Taylor School District, Romulus Community School District, Wayne-Westland Community Schools and Westwood Community School District. Areas were given to the new districts by quadrants. Students north of Michigan Avenue and west of Middlebelt were rezoned to Wayne-Westland. Students north of Michigan Avenue and east of Middlebelt were rezoned to Westwood. Students south of Michigan Avenue and west of Middlebelt were rezoned to Romulus. Students south of Michigan and east of Middlebelt were rezoned to Taylor. The district will remain intact for taxing purposes as long as the existing debt is being paid off. Almost all Inkster district employees lost their jobs. Wayne RESA obtained the Inkster school district records.

State representative David Knezek of Dearborn Heights asked Attorney General of Michigan Bill Schuette for a formal opinion on whether or not the closure of the Inkster district was legal or if it was in violation of the Michigan Constitution or other state laws.

== Demographics ==
In 2013, prior to closure, two of three teachers had taught in the district for fewer than five years. 83% of students qualified for free or reduced lunch.

== Schools ==
The following schools were open prior to the district dissolving:

Secondary schools

- Inkster High School (Inkster) - In 2013 the school had 940 students
- Inkster 9th Grade Academy (Inkster, formerly Fellrath Middle School)
- Inkster Vocational Academy (Inkster)
- Blanchette Middle School (Inkster)

Elementary schools

- Baylor-Woodson Elementary School (Inkster)
  - Now Burger Baylor School for Students with Autism of the Garden City School District
- Meek-Milton Elementary School (Inkster)

Defunct schools

The following schools had already been shuttered prior to the district dissolving:

- Brake Elementary School (Inkster) - Formerly the John D. Hearn, S.R. Public Academy and Thomas Gist Academy North, this school is now destroyed.
- Carver Elementary School (Inkster) - Razed and replaced by the Baylor-Woodson/Meek-Milton school building.
- Douglas Elementary School (Inkster) - Razed and replaced by Haddon Estates.
- Frazier Elementary School (Westland) - Now the Thomas Gist Academy South.
- Lincoln Elementary School (Inkster) - Currently abandoned.
- Parkwood Elementary School (Inkster) - Razed.
- Woodson Elementary School (Inkster)
