= Romulus Community School District =

School district in Michigan, United States

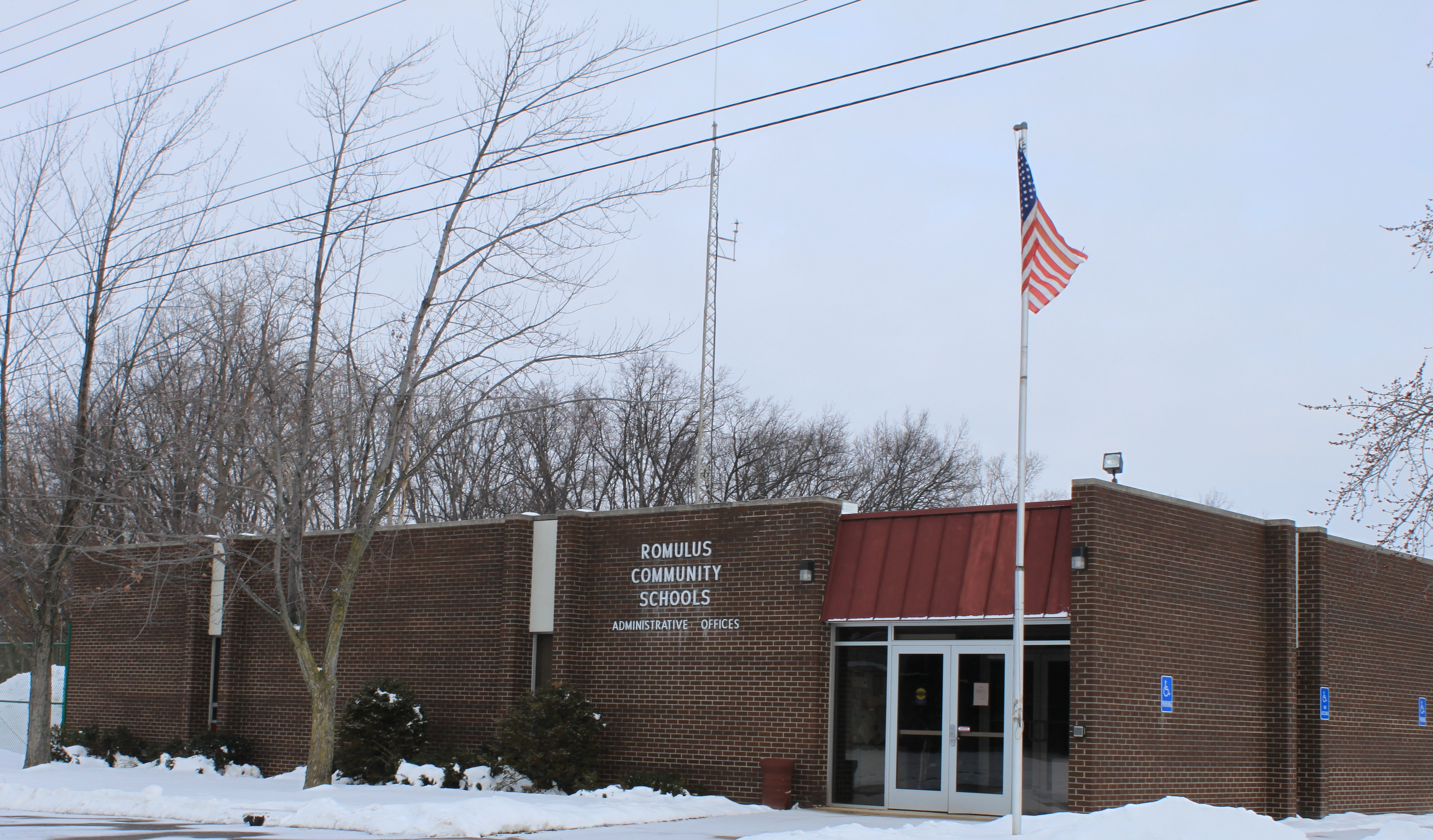
- Romulus Community Schools administrative offices

Address
- 36540 Grant Street Romulus, Michigan, 48174; United States

District information
- Grades: Pre-Kindergarten-12
- Superintendent: Dr. Benjamin P Edmondson
- Schools: 8
- Budget: $49,253,000 2022-2023 expenditures
- NCES District ID: 2630120

Students and staff
- Students: 2,077 (2024-2025)
- Teachers: 133.3 (on an FTE basis) (2024-2025)
- Staff: 361.11 FTE (2024-2025)
- Student–teacher ratio: 15.58 (2024-2025)

Other information
- Website: www.romulusk12.org

Romulus Community School District, also referred to as Romulus Community Schools (RCS) and Romulus School District, is a public school district in Wayne County, Michigan in Metro Detroit. It serves parts of Romulus, Inkster, and Westland.

== History ==
Romulus High School was built in 1957. The architecture firm was Jahr, Anderson of Dearborn.

As of Summer 2013, the Inkster Public Schools District was entirely dissolved. The Romulus school district absorbed some of the Inkster boundary. Students south of Michigan Avenue and west of Middlebelt were rezoned to Romulus.

== Schools ==
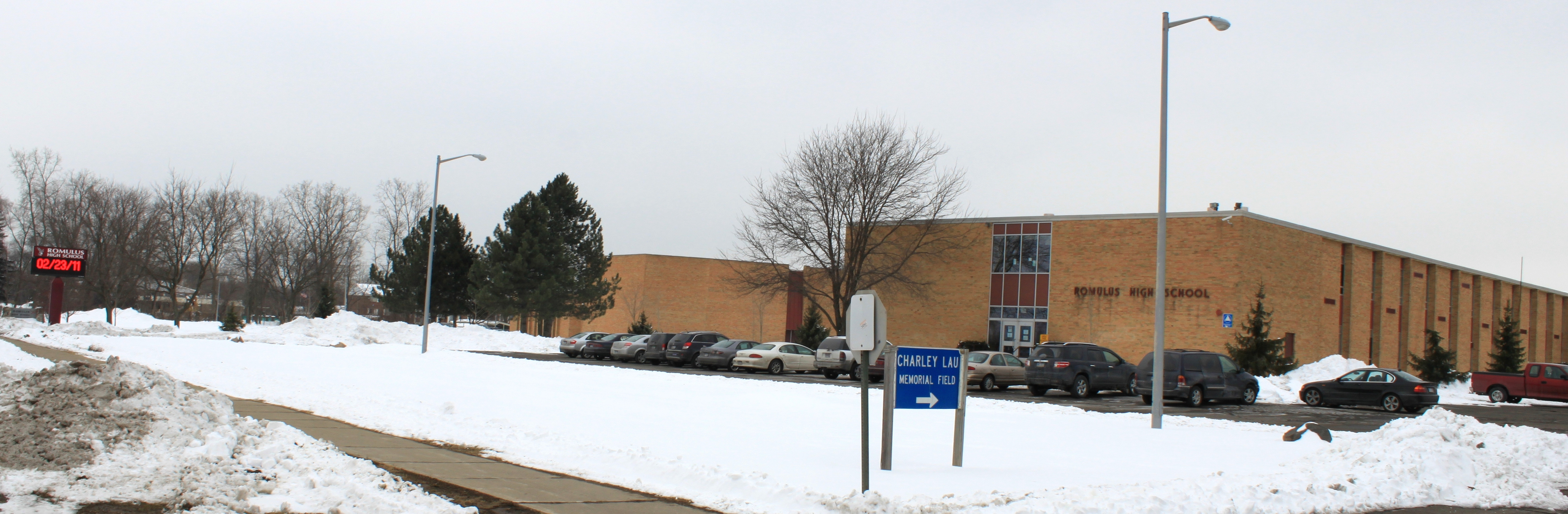
Romulus Senior High School

Schools in Romulus Community School District
School name	Address	School Mascot	Grades
Romulus Senior High School	9650 Wayne Road, Romulus	Eagles	9th – 12th grade
Romulus Middle School	37300 Wick Road, Romulus	Bulldogs	6th – 8th grade
Barth Elementary School	38207 Barth Road, Romulus	Bears	Kindergarten – 5th grade
Halecreek Elementary School	16200 Harrison Road, Romulus	Hawks	Kindergarten – 5th grade
Romulus Elementary School	32200 Beverly Road, Romulus	Jaguars	Kindergarten – 5th grade
Romulus Virtual Learning Center	9650 S Wayne Road, Romulus		9-12
Wick Elementary School	36900 Wick Road, Romulus	Eagles	Kindergarten – 5th grade
Romulus Early Childhood Center	35200 Smith Road, Romulus		Preschool

== Former district schools ==
- Beverly Elementary (Guidance Center Head Start & Administrative Offices)
- Cory Elementary (closed 2010—now GSRP Center)
- Gordonier Elementary (razed—site is now vacant lot)
- Harrison Elementary (occupied by Central Global Express)
- Hayti-Beverly Elementary (razed—site is now vacant lot)
- Merriman Elementary (now Romulus Alternative Middle/High School)
- Mt. Pleasant Elementary (Romulus/Van Buren Adult Education Center)
- Romulus Elementary (original school located on Olive near downtown area—now the Romulus Police Department)
- Texas Elementary (schoolhouse—remodeled into office building)
- North Middle (still in operation—now Romulus Middle School)
- South Middle (original location of Romulus High School—razed for now former Senior Citizens Park)
