= Charlie Henry (basketball, born 1985) =

American basketball coach

Current position
- Title: Head Coach
- Team: Georgia Southern
- Conference: Sun Belt
- Record: 47–56 (.456)

Biographical details
- Born: April 13, 1986 (age 40); Canton, Michigan, U.S.

Playing career
- 2005–2009: Madonna

Coaching career (HC unless noted)
- 2009–2010: Romulus HS (asst.)
- 2014–2015: Iowa State (assistant)
- 2015–2017: Chicago Bulls (assistant)
- 2017–2019: Windy City Bulls
- 2019–2023: Alabama (assistant)
- 2023–present: Georgia Southern

Administrative career (AD unless noted)
- 2010–2011: Utah (graduate manager)
- 2011–2012: Indiana Pacers (VC)
- 2013–2014: Iowa State (director of player personnel)

Head coaching record
- Overall: 47–56 (.456)

Charlie Henry is an American basketball coach, currently the head coach for the Georgia Southern men's basketball team of the Sun Belt Conference.

== Playing career ==
Henry played four years Madonna University in Michigan.

== Coaching career ==
Henry's coaching career began at Romulus HS under Nate Oats for one season before becoming a graduate manager at Utah before joining the Indiana Pacers as a video coordinator. In 2013, he'd join Iowa State's coaching staff as director of player personnel before being promoted to assistant coach by head coach Fred Hoiberg. In July 2015, Henry followed Hoiberg to the NBA as he took the head coaching position with the Chicago Bulls. Henry would get his first head coaching experience in August 2017, when he was named the head coach of the Windy City Bulls in the NBA G-League.

Henry would reunite with Oats at Alabama in 2019 as an assistant coach, and he'd serve in the role until he was named the head coach at Georgia Southern, replacing Brian Burg on March 14, 2023.

== Head coaching record ==
=== College ===
Record table
Season	Team	Overall	Conference	Standing	Postseason
Georgia Southern Eagles (Sun Belt Conference) (2023–present)
2023–24	Georgia Southern	9–24	8–10	T–7th	
2024–25	Georgia Southern	17–16	8–10	T–8th	
2025–26	Georgia Southern	21–16	8–10	10th	
Georgia Southern:		47–56 (.456)	24–30 (.444)		
Total:		47–56 (.456)			
National champion Postseason invitational champion Conference regular season champion Conference regular season and conference tournament champion Division regular season champion Division regular season and conference tournament champion Conference tournament champion
