= Georgia Southern Eagles men's basketball =

College basketball team

2025–26 Georgia Southern Eagles men's basketball team
- University: Georgia Southern University
- Head coach: Charlie Henry (3rd season)
- Location: Statesboro, Georgia
- Arena: Hill Convocation Center (capacity: 5,500)
- Conference: Sun Belt Conference
- Nickname: Eagles
- Colors: Blue and white

NCAA Division I tournament Sweet Sixteen
- 1970*

NCAA Division I tournament appearances
- 1970*, 1983, 1987, 1992

NAIA tournament appearances
- 1956, 1958, 1959, 1964, 1966

Conference tournament champions
- TAAC/A-Sun: 1983, 1987, 1992

Conference regular-season champions
- TAAC/A-Sun: 1985, 1988, 1989, 1992; SoCon: 2006

Conference division champions
- 2002, 2004, 2006
- * at Division II level

The Georgia Southern Eagles men's basketball team is the basketball team that represents Georgia Southern University in Statesboro, Georgia, United States. The school's team currently competes in the Sun Belt Conference and is coached by Charlie Henry. The Eagles have appeared three times in the NCAA tournament, most recently in 1992.

== Postseason results ==
=== NCAA Division I ===
The Eagles have appeared in three NCAA tournaments. Their combined record is 0–3.

Year	Round	Opponent	Result
1983	Preliminary Round	Robert Morris	L 54–64
1987	First Round	Syracuse	L 73–79
1992	First Round	Oklahoma State	L 73–100

=== NCAA Division II ===
Georgia Southern appeared in one Division II tournament. Their record was 1–1.

Year	Round	Opponent	Result
1970	First Round; Sweet Sixteen	Old Dominion; Stetson	W 86–79; L 86–93

=== NIT ===
The Eagles have appeared in three National Invitation Tournaments (NIT). Their combined record is 0–3.

Year	Round	Opponent	Result
1988	First Round	Georgia	L 48–53
1989	First Round	UAB	L 74–83
2006	Opening Round	Charlotte	L 61–77

=== CBI ===
The Eagles have appeared in one College Basketball Invitational (CBI). Their record is 0–1.

Year	Round	Opponent	Result
2017	First Round	Utah Valley	L 49–74

== Eagles in the NBA ==
3 former Georgia Southern players have played at least one game in the NBA.

Name	Draft Year	Draft Team
Michael Curry	1993	Undrafted
Jeff Sanders	1989	Chicago Bulls
Perry Warbington	1974	Philadelphia 76ers

== Eagles in international leagues ==
- Zack Bryant (born 1997), basketball player in the Israeli Basketball Premier League
