= Bridget A. Taylor =

American psychologist and behavior analysis researcher

Bridget A. Taylor is an American psychologist and behavior analyst, specializing in autism. She is the co-founder and CEO of Alpine Learning Group, a private school for autistic students. Taylor is recognized for her research on autistic children in an applied practice setting, which has led to the development of research programs in other applied settings.

== Career ==
Taylor earned a master’s in early childhood special education and teaching from Teachers College at Columbia University and a PsyD from the Graduate School of Applied and Professional Psychology from Rutgers University.

In 1988, Taylor co-founded the Alpine Learning Group, a private school for autistic students located in Paramus, New Jersey. She has spent her entire career in clinical practice and leadership, while also conducting applied research on observational learning, social skills, and other areas. Her research on compassionate care and the importance of having empathy as an applied behavior analysis (ABA) practitioner spurred additional research and discussion within the ABA community.

Taylor gained recognition in 1994 from her work teaching skills to autistic children, described in Catherine Maurice's book, Let Me Hear Your Voice: A Family's Triumph Over Autism. In her book, Maurice highlighted how Taylor taught her autistic daughter Anne Marie new skills and prosocial behaviors.

In 2006, Time reported that stimming was "strongly suppressed" in autistic students at Alpine Learning Group. In response to a teacher correcting a child when they flapped their hands, Taylor told the publication, "We're not a culture that accepts that [stimming]. ... Fifty percent of the battle is addressing behavior to look good." Despite non-injurious stimming being traditionally stigmatized and pathologized, it serves important self-regulatory and communicative functions in autistic people and has been reclaimed by members of the Autistic community as a harmless and positive trait.

Taylor has served as an associate editor at Journal of Applied Behavior Analysis, and on the editorial boards of Behavior Analysis in Practice, and Behavioral Interventions. She is the former president of the Behavior Analyst Certification Board and current senior clinical advisor for Rethink Behavioral Health. Taylor has influenced the development of autism centers in Italy, India, Canada, France, Australia, and Kosovo.

== Awards and honors ==
- Association for Behavior Analysis International: Fellow
- Cambridge Center for Behavioral Studies: Advisor
- Behavior Analysis Certification Board: Past President
- Association for Science in Autism Treatment: Advisory Member

== Selected works ==
- Taylor, B. A., LeBlanc, L. A., & Nosik, M. R. (2018). Compassionate care in behavior analytic treatment: Can outcomes be enhanced by attending to relationships with caregivers? Behavior Analysis in Practice, 12(3), 654–666. https://doi.org/10.1007/s40617-018-00289-3 PMID 31976276
- Taylor B. A. (2015). Stereo knobs and swing sets: Falling in love with the science of behavior. The Behavior Analyst, 38(2), 283–292. https://doi.org/10.1007/s40614-015-0041-6 https://pubmed.ncbi.nlm.nih.gov/27606180 PMID 27606180
- Taylor, B. A., & DeQuinzio, J. A. (2012). Observational learning and children with autism. Behavior Modification, 36(3), 341–360. https://doi.org/10.1177/0145445512443981 PMID 22569578
- Taylor, B. A., & Fisher, J. (2010). Three important things to consider when starting intervention for a child diagnosed with autism. Behavior Analysis in Practice, 3(2), 52–53. https://doi.org/10.1007/BF03391765 PMID 22532894
