= Beating the Odds =

Autism school in Canada

Beating the Odds IBI & Child Development Services
- Trade name: Beating the Odds
- Industry: Health
- Founded: 2015
- Founder: Amber Maloney
- Headquarters: Utopia, Essa, Ontario, Canada
- Services: Applied Behaviour Analysis, Intensive Behavioural Intervention
- Owner: Amber Maloney
- Website: www.beatingtheoddsautism.com

Beating the Odds IBI & Child Development Services, commonly known as Beating the Odds, was a Canadian company that provided therapy to children on the autism spectrum.

Founded by Amber Maloney in 2015, the company initially provided home-care visits, and opened a therapy centre near Barrie, Ontario in 2022.

The centre was shut down in 2023, shortly before the owner was arrested.

== Activities ==
Beating the Odds IBI & Child Development Services was founded in 2015 by Amber-Lee Maloney (born 1986 or 1987). Based in Essa, Ontario, the company provided Applied Behaviour Analysis and Intensive Behavioural Intervention therapies. Initially providing autism therapy via home-visits, the company opened a therapy centre on June 23, 2022. By July 2023, the centre had not obtained a license to operate the therapy centre.

On July 18, 2023, the Ontario Ministry of Education issued a protection order to the school, declaring "an imminent risk to the safety and wellbeing of the children receiving care." The order prohibited the centre from operating. The Ontario Ministry of the Solicitor General issued a statement discouraging parents from using the centre. The day prior, the Ontario Provincial Police issued a public advisory about Lauriston Maloney (born 1980 or 1981) the husband of Amber Maloney and a convinced sex offender. Lauriston Maloney was operating a construction company, registered to the same address as the centre and lived on the same premises. From 2002 to 2004, Lauriston Charles Maloney operated a business managing sex workers. According to Maloney, one of his workers was under 18 years old. In 2004, Maloney was arrested and charged with offences after a fourteen-year-old girl from Brampton was allegedly forced to perform sex work for one month. In their public advisory, police noted Lauriston Maloney's sixteen convictions in relation to "trafficking and sexual offences involving minors." His convictions occurred in 2004 and 2013.

Parents of the children who attended the centre held a second protest outside the centre on July 19. The same day the centre was searched by police and both Lauriston Maloney and Amber Maloney were arrested. Lauriston Maloney was charged with "two counts of assault, trafficking a person, receiving material benefit from trafficking a person and forcible confinement". Amber was charged with "trafficking a person, receiving material benefit from trafficking a person, administering a noxious substance, fraud and uttering a forged document."

== See also ==
- Autism therapies
- List of schools for people on the autism spectrum
