= Tettenhall Wood School =

Location
- Regis Road; Wolverhampton, West Midlands, WV6 8XF; England

Information
- Type: Special school
- Department for Education URN: 149227 Tables
- Ofsted: Reports
- Head teacher: Ross Ashcroft
- Gender: Coeducational
- Age: 4 to 19
- Enrollment: 164 (December 2024)
- Website: https://www.tettenhallwood.aatrust.co.uk

Tettenhall Wood School is an all-through special school for autistic children in Tettenhall, Wolverhampton, England. The school is part of Amethyst Academies Trust.

The school was awarded Autism Accreditation at Advanced status by the National Autistic Society in 2022.

== School site and facilities ==
Tettenhall Wood School was situated on School Road in Tettenhall, Wolverhampton until 2010, when it relocated to Regis Road. A housing development was built on the school's former site.

The school has a student-run café called 'The Tree Room'. An outdoor learning pod opened at the school in 2022.

== TWS Sports podcast ==
Since 2021, students attending Tettenhall Wood School have hosted a podcast named TWS Sports. It won the Best Equality and Social Impact award at the 2022 Sports Podcast Awards.

== Incidents ==
In April 2023, former teaching assistant William Kevin Clifford physically attacked a 13-year-old student with complex needs. Clifford pleaded guilty to charges of child cruelty in July 2024, and was given a nine month suspended prison sentence.
