= Spa School Bermondsey =

Location
- Monnow Road; Bermondsey; London, SE1 5RN; England; 51.49174°N 0.06758°W

Information
- Type: Special school Academy
- Local authority: Southwark
- Department for Education URN: 146190 Tables
- Ofsted: Reports
- Headteacher: Simon Eccles
- Gender: Coeducational
- Age: 11 to 19
- Enrolment: 122 (November 2026)
- Website: www.spa-bermondsey.org

Spa School Bermondsey is a coeducational special school for pupils aged 11 to 19. It is located in the Bermondsey area of the London Borough of Southwark, England. It is one of Britain's largest state schools for children with autism, and has a high staff to student ratio.

The school occupies an old-fashioned red-brick building behind which is a landscaped garden through which flows an artificial stream.

== History ==
The school was originally built in 1874 by the London School Board and called the Monnow Road School. It was built as part of a rapid wave of construction after the LSB was founded in 1870 by the Elementary Education Act 1870, which provided education for the whole of England and Wales. The LSB built several hundred schools in its first four years, known for their characteristic Queen Anne style architecture.

In 1915 the school was renamed Bermondsey Central School.

In 1940-1941 the school was bombed by an air raid in the Blitz and was partially rebuilt. It was later renamed Spa School.

In 2018 the school was converted to an academy managed by a new organisation, the Spa Education Trust. In 2020 the trust became a multi-academy trust when it opened a second location in Camberwell.

== Students ==
There are 100 pupils aged between 11 and 19, both boys and girls, with a range of autism spectrum disorders between severe and high-functioning.

== Media attention ==
The school was featured within a BBC article "School grounds 'improve behaviour'" and students and staff alike were interviewed on the school's scheme of natural improvement within the school grounds.

A Channel 4 documentary Make Me Normal, broadcast on 2 June 2005, was filmed at the school.

In 2026 The school's head chef Tracy Nwabia won the Jamie Oliver Good School Food Award. The school's menu is entirely meat-free and intentionally has a range of textures to accommodate sensory difficulties. The school also operates Spa School House Cafe, which is open to the public and provides work experience and employability certifications to Key Stage 5 students.
