= The Heights Academy =

Location
- Auckland Drive; Smith's Wood, West Midlands, B36 0DD; England

Information
- Type: Special school
- Established: 2023
- Department for Education URN: 149753 Tables
- Ofsted: Reports
- Head teacher: Nicola Redhead
- Gender: Coeducational
- Age: 7 to 16
- Enrollment: 26 (March 2025)
- Website: https://heights.fet.ac

The Heights Academy is a special school in Smith's Wood in the Metropolitan Borough of Solihull, England. It primarily caters for autistic children between the ages of 7 and 16, and is part of the Forward Education Trust.

The Heights Academy was established in 2023. It is located in purpose-built premises on the former site of Bosworth Infant and Junior School. The school initially educated pupils in years 3 to 7, and started accepting pupils up to year 11 at the end of the 2023-24 academic year.

In early 2025, The Heights Academy became the subject of allegations that school staff have bullied pupils. The Forward Education Trust launched an independent investigation into these claims on 3 March 2025.
