= Burger School for Students with Autism =

School in Michigan, United States

Information
- Former names: The Developmental Learning Program
- Founded: 1972
- Locale: Inkster, Michigan
- School district: Garden City School District
- Director: Susan Smitt
- Grades: K-12
- Age range: 3 to 26
- Average class size: 5
- Campuses: 28865 Carlysle, Inkster, MI 48141; 30300 Maplewood, Garden City, MI 48135
- Website: Burger School website

The Burger School for Students with Autism was established in 1973 as the Developmental Learning Program. Burger School is operated by the Garden City School District for the Wayne County Regional Educational Agency. It accepts students from preschool to high school, from age 3 to 26, from 34 school districts in Wayne County, Michigan.

== History ==
The Developmental Learning Program is a program within the Garden City Public Schools that began in 1973. In 2014, the Developmental Learning Program moved to one of its two current locations and took its present name. The school now supports two campuses.

The Burger Baylor School for Students with Autism is located in Inkster, in the former Baylor-Woodson Elementary School of Inkster Public Schools. (42°16′51.8″N 83°19′34.7″W)

== See also ==
- List of schools for people on the autism spectrum
