= Garden City Public Schools =

School district in Michigan

Address
- 1333 Radcliff Garden City, Wayne, Michigan, 48135; United States

District information
- Grades: Pre-Kindergarten-12
- Superintendent: Derek Fisher
- Schools: 8
- Budget: $87,304,000 2022-2023 expenditures
- NCES District ID: 2615540

Students and staff
- Students: 3,217 (2024-2025)
- Teachers: 240.1 (on an FTE basis) (2024-2025)
- Staff: 623.99 FTE (2024-2025)
- Student–teacher ratio: 13.4 (2024-2025)

Other information
- Website: www.gardencityschools.com

Garden City Public Schools is a public school district serving Garden City, Michigan and a small part of Livonia in the Metro Detroit area.

== History ==
Garden City High School was built in 1950. In 1965, West High School was established and the existing high school became East High. In the summer of 1982, West High School closed and became Garden City Middle School, and all high school classes moved to the former East High building.

== Schools ==
Schools in Garden City Public Schools district
| School | Address | Notes |
|---|---|---|
| Garden City High School (Michigan) | 6500 Middlebelt Rd., Garden City | Grades 9–12. Built 1950. |
| Garden City Middle School | 1851 Radcliff, Garden City | Grades 7–8. Built 1965. |
| Lathers Early Childhood and Kindergarten Center | 28351 Marquette, Garden City | Preschool and Kindergarten |
| Memorial 1–2 Campus | 30001 Marquette, Garden City | Grades 1–2 |
| Douglas 3–4 Campus | 6400 Hartel, Garden City | Grades 3–4 |
| Farmington 5–6 Campus | 33411 Marquette, Garden City | Grades 5–6 |
| Burger Transition Center | 30300 Maplewood, Garden City | Formerly Henry Ruff Elementary |
| Cambridge High School | 28901 Cambridge, Garden City | Alternative high school, Grades 9–12 |
| Burger Baylor School | 28865 Carlysle, Inkster | Focuses on students with autism spectrum |
