= Exeter House School =

Location
- Somerset Road; Salisbury; Wiltshire, SP1 3BL; England
- Coordinates: 51.0811°N 1.7904°W

Information
- Type: Special school/Academy
- Local authority: Wiltshire
- Department for Education URN: 141647 Tables
- Ofsted: Reports
- Gender: Mixed
- Age: 2 to 19
- Enrolment: 194 (September 2025)
- Website: www.exeterhouseschool.co.uk

Exeter House School is a mixed special school in Salisbury, Wiltshire, England.

The school educates children with severe and profound and multiple learning difficulties. These difficulties may be caused by autism spectrum disorders and other communication and language problems. It is run by the Brunel Academies Trust, alongside other schools in Swindon and Salisbury.

The school is called Exeter House because it was originally based in Exeter House in Exeter Street in Salisbury. It is now off Somerset Road in Salisbury.
