= Marshalltown Community College =

Public college in Marshalltown, Iowa, US

- Former name: Marshalltown Junior College
- Type: Public community college
- Established: 1927
- Parent institution: Iowa Valley Community College District
- Students: 1,726
- Location: Marshalltown, Iowa, United States of America; 42.001°N 92.909°W
- Nickname: Tigers
- Mascot: Tiger
- Website: mcc.iavalley.edu

Marshalltown Community College (MCC) is a public community college in Marshalltown, Iowa. It is part of the Iowa Valley Community College District. The campus is located just to the south of Marshalltown along Highway 30. A second campus, Iowa Valley Grinnell, is located in Grinnell. MCC offers 55 degree/diploma options, has a student-faculty ratio of 13:1, and has an annual enrollment at about 2,000 students.

== History ==
The college opened in 1927 as Marshalltown Junior College under the jurisdiction of the Marshalltown Community School District until moving into the Iowa Valley Community College District in 1966.

== Academics ==
This school offers most two-year courses of study, and many of the courses are four-year-college prerequisite courses.

The college is one of three in the Iowa Valley Community College District system. The other two are Ellsworth Community College in Iowa Falls and Iowa Valley Community College at Grinnell.

== Campus ==
Unlike many community colleges in the United States, MCC offers on-campus housing for students. Student housing consists of three new building units, two with 12 suites and one with 15. There are 156 tenants in these apartments. Each "apartment-style" room contains two bedrooms with two beds apiece, and a central kitchenette and "living room".

=== Transportation ===
MCC is connected to Marshalltown via the Purple Route of Marshalltown Municipal Transit. The Purple Route runs weekdays from campus to downtown Marshalltown.

== Athletics ==
The college's sports teams are called the Tigers and compete in the Iowa Community College Athletic Conference of the NJCAA. The men's sports available are baseball, basketball, and soccer. The women's sports are basketball, volleyball, and softball.

In the past, the school fielded a football team, as well as a men's and women's golf program along with men's and women's cross country.

Both genders compete in various eSports titles.

== Notable alumni ==
- Will Clyburn, professional basketball player, 2016 top scorer in the Israel Basketball Premier League, 2019 EuroLeague Final Four MVP
