= Alpine Learning Group =

Private special education school in Paramus, New Jersey, United States

Location
- 777 Paramus Road; Paramus, New Jersey 07652; United States; 40.9792°N 74.0896°W

Information
- Type: Private school Special education
- Religious affiliation: Nonsectarian
- Established: 1988
- Founder: Bridget A. Taylor; Fred Bunker; Debra Gladstone; Mark Gladstone; Linda S. Meyer
- NCES School ID: A9502736
- Director: Bridget A. Taylor (executive director)
- Principal: Courtney DeBiase
- Teaching staff: 5.0 (on an FTE basis)
- Grades: Nursery-12
- Gender: Co-educational
- Enrollment: 35
- Student to teacher ratio: 7.0
- Accreditation: National Association of Private Special Education Centers; New Jersey Department of Education
- Website: alpinelearninggroup.org

Alpine Learning Group is a private special education school in Paramus, New Jersey. Established in 1988, the school bases its teaching model on the principles of applied behavior analysis (ABA); it serves autistic students ages 3 to 21.

== History ==
Founded in 1988 by a group of New Jersey ABA practitioners and parents, Alpine Learning Group was one of the first ABA-based schools for autistic students formed in the United States. It opened its doors in 1989 when four children were instructed by a professional faculty in "the basement of a local community house."

The executive director and co-founder Bridget Taylor, Psy.D., B.C.B.A.-D., as well as other supervising staff at the school, wrote the curriculum in the popular training manual Behavioral intervention for young children with autism: A manual for parents and professionals (1996), which was edited by Catherine Maurice, Ph.D., a New York City parent advocate who hired Taylor to run her two children's early ABA home programs in 1987.

In 2006, Time reported that stimming was "strongly suppressed" in autistic students at Alpine Learning Group. In response to a teacher correcting a child when they flapped their hands, Taylor told the publication, "We're not a culture that accepts that [stimming]. ... Fifty percent of the battle is addressing behavior to look good." Despite non-injurious stimming being traditionally stigmatized and pathologized, it serves important self-regulatory and communicative functions in autistic people and has been reclaimed by members of the Autistic community as a harmless and positive trait.

== Program ==
The school offers several programs grounded in the principles of ABA. Its educational program includes a faculty of over 100 staff who instruct a total of 35 students in a small, 1 to 1 classroom ratio.

Their Center for Autism provides home-based, structured and naturalistic early intensive behavioral intervention programs, such as discrete trial training and incidental teaching, for language delayed children from birth to aged 5, social skills groups where students are taught how to interact with their peers, and a clinic that administers diagnostic and screening services.

The Ely Center for Adult Learning consists of transition programs, which train students between the ages of 16 and 21 to gain employment skills, as well as to prepare them for college or other pre-vocational career goals.
