= Orion Academy (California) =

Location
- 1866 Clayton Rd, Concord, CA; United States; 37°58′25″N 122°02′08″W

Information
- Type: High School
- Established: 2000
- Founder: Kathryn Stewart
- Grades: 9-12
- Colors: Blue and White
- Website: www.orionacademy.org

Orion Academy is a private high school in Concord, California, United States, for students with autism, nonverbal learning disorder (NLD), and other neurocognitive disabilities. It offers a special education college preparatory program for grades 9-12.

The school maintains a staff-to-student ratio of 1:4 with an average class size of seven. Over 90% of its graduates attend college or post-secondary training. In 2010, there were 80 students enrolled in total. In 2017, there were 44 currently enrolled students. As of 2026, there are approximately 35 enrolled students.

== History ==
Orion Academy is accredited by the Western Association of Schools and Colleges (WASC), has a 180-day curriculum, and is approved as a nonpublic school by the State of California.

Kathryn Stewart is Orion Academy's Executive Director. In 1988, Sue Thompson, Judy Lewis, all involved with nonverbal learning disorder, met with Stewart to ask her to set up a school for students with NLD or Asperger's syndrome. They introduced Stewart to Aaron and Val Simon, parents of a child with Asperger's syndrome who were interested in funding a school. With funding from the Simons, after two years of planning meetings, Orion Academy welcomed its first eight students taught by four teachers in September 2000. By June 2001, there were twelve students.

In 2022, Orion Academy relocated from Moraga, California to its current location in Concord.

== Offerings ==
Orion Academy has teachers in Language Arts, Math, Latin, the Sciences, Special Education, Social Science, and Social Skills.

More than 25 college preparatory courses are offered to a student body of approximately 45, taught by 12 professionals. Extracurricular activities include the Quantitative Finance Club, Dungeons & Dragons Club, Movie Club, student council, a travel program, and Senior Readiness activities, including Senior Challenge, among others. Orion-specific activities include the Dog Program, a mandatory personal project class where students present on topics of their choosing, social skills groups, mandated volunteer experiences, Mandatory Latin classes, and school-provided internship opportunities.
