= Romulus, Michigan =

- City
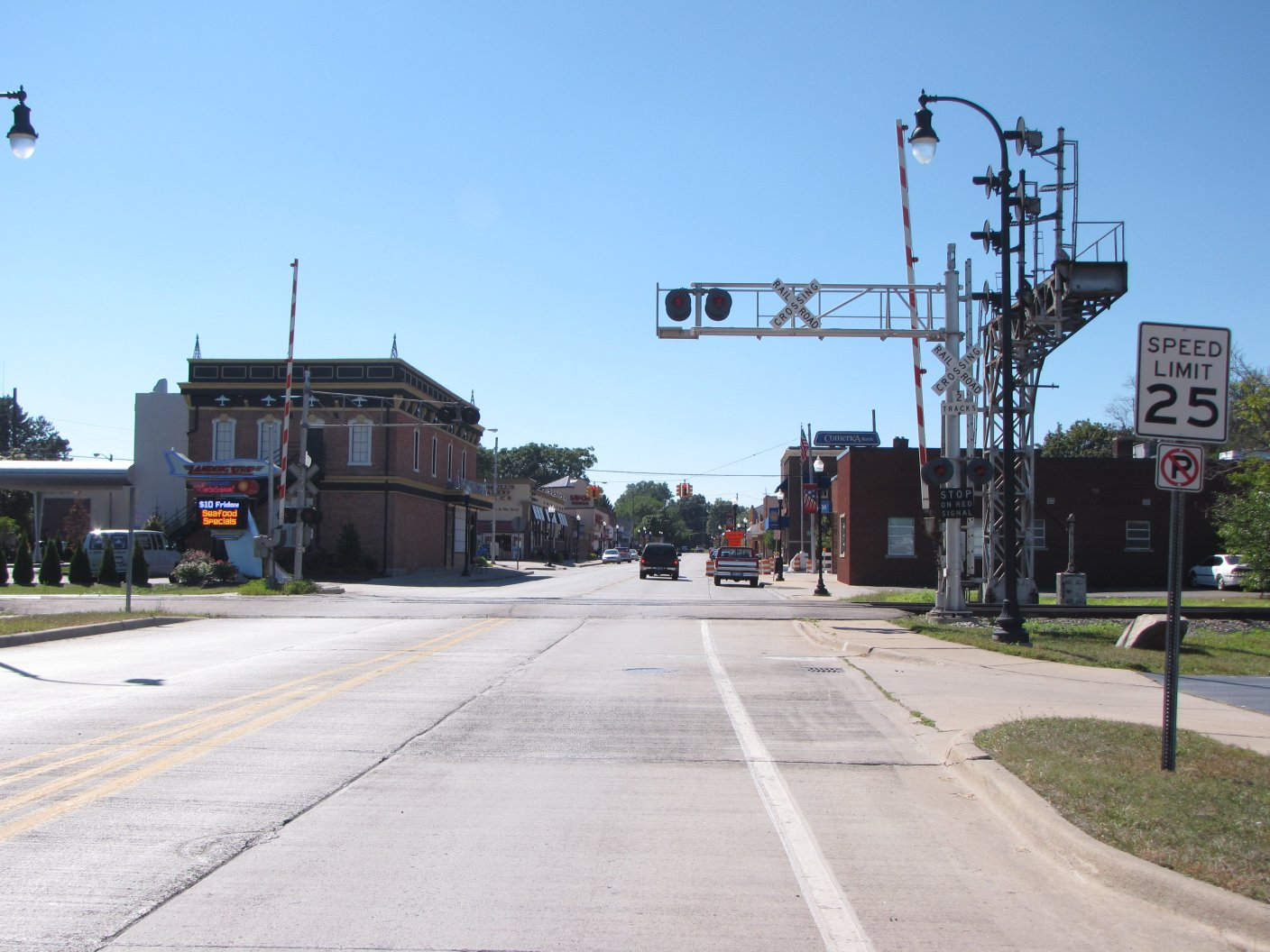
- Downtown Romulus

- Seal
- Nickname: "Rom-town"
- Motto: "Home of Opportunity"
- Location within Wayne County

- Location within the state of Michigan Location within the United States
- Coordinates: 42°13′20″N 83°23′48″W
- Country: United States
- State: Michigan
- County: Wayne
- Settled: 1826
- Organized: 1835 (Romulus Township)
- Incorporated: 1970

Government
  - Type: Mayor–council
  - Mayor: Robert A. McCraight
  - Clerk: Ellen Craig-Bragg

Area
  - City: 35.95 sq mi (93.12 km^{2})
  - Land: 35.61 sq mi (92.22 km^{2})
  - Water: 0.34 sq mi (0.89 km^{2})
- Elevation: 659 ft (201 m)

Population (2020)
  - City: 25,178
  - Density: 707.1/sq mi (273.01/km^{2})
  - Metro: 4,285,832 (Metro Detroit)
- Time zone: UTC-5 (Eastern (EST))
  - Summer (DST): UTC-4 (EDT)
- ZIP code(s): 48174, 48184; 48242 (Detroit) (Note: The Detroit 48242 ZIP Code is used exclusively for the Detroit Metropolitan Airport, which is a county-owned airport located in Romulus.)
- Area code: 734
- FIPS code: 26-69420
- GNIS feature ID: 0636147
- Website: romulusgov.com

Romulus is a city in Wayne County in the U.S. state of Michigan. A western suburb of Detroit, Romulus is located roughly 20 miles (32.2 km) southwest of downtown Detroit, and is most notable as the location of Detroit Metropolitan Airport. As of the 2020 census, the city had a population of 25,178.

== History ==
The first white settler in Romulus was Samuel Polyne, a French Canadian, who settled on section 2 in 1826, though he left soon after the township was organized in 1835.

The first settler in the village proper (prior to the 1865 annexation of the whole village and township into one city) was Samuel McMath, who moved from New York state to the area in 1827. He improved land and planned to bring his family to settle there, but he died before he could carry out this plan.

Solomon Whitaker, Charles and Joseph Pulcifer located in the area in 1830, and in 1833, Jenks Pullen and his six sons settled at what became known as "Pullen's Corners" (located in section 19 at the intersection of Ozga and Goddard roads, now commonly called "Five Points"). Pullen's Corners was platted in 1836. The community later took on the name of the township.

The township of Romulus was set off from a part of Huron Township by an act of the Michigan Territorial Council on March 17, 1835, and the first township meeting was held on April 16, 1835, two years before the State of Michigan was admitted in to the Union (1837), in the house of Joseph T. Pullen. The first supervisor was David J. Pullen. The township's name was changed to "Wayne" on March 19, 1845, but was changed back to Romulus on January 16, 1848.

Romulus incorporated as a city in 1970.

=== Village of Romulus ===
The village of Romulus was platted on the Lansing B. Misner estate in 1871.

=== Underground Railroad stops ===
Romulus was a stop of the Underground Railroad in the 1800s when slaves fled the inhumane conditions of plantations in the South for the free states of the North. There were two stops in Romulus and those structures are still intact to this day.

- Samuel Kingsley Home is a famous historic landmark in Romulus. During slave times, Samuel R. Kingsley lived in a house on Ozga Rd near Pullens Corners, what is today known as Five Points. He hid slaves in an underground cellar. Today, the house is located on Hunt Street across from the Romulus Historical Museum. The address to the house was 37426 S. Huron River Drive.
- The White Church at the Pullens Corner / Five Points was also an underground railroad stop. Today, the church, which is now called 5 Points Church, still sits at the corner.

=== Preston ===
Preston was located in the north-east part of Romulus. It had a post office from 1899 to 1906.

=== Airliner incidents ===
On August 16, 1987, Detroit Metro Airport in Romulus was the site of the Northwest Airlines Flight 255 disaster, in which the plane crashed into an overpass bridge and exploded just seconds after taking off. The crash killed all but one of the 155 passengers and crew and two more people on the roadway. A memorial for the victims is at the crash site at the Interstate 94 and Middlebelt Road interchange.

=== Chemical plant explosion ===
On August 9, 2005, at approximately 9:30 PM, the EQ Recovery Plant caught fire. Citizens within 1 to 1 1/3 miles (1.6 to 2.1 km) radius were forced to evacuate their homes. Romulus and Wayne fire crews and crews from neighboring communities managed to put out the fire after letting it burn down a little bit. Chemical-filled smoke filled the sky, causing respiratory problems. Many citizens from both Romulus and Wayne were taken to Oakwood Annapolis Hospital (now Beaumont Hospital-Wayne), about two miles from the explosion site. No one was injured.

== Geography ==
According to the United States Census Bureau, the city has a total area of 35.95 square miles (93.11 km^{2}), of which 35.61 square miles (92.23 km^{2}) is land and 0.35 square miles (0.91 km^{2}) (0.95%) is water.

Romulus is in the south-central portion of Wayne County. Interstate 94 (I-94) and I-275 run through the city.

The City of Romulus is bordered to the north by Van Born Road, to the south by Pennsylvania Road, to the east by Inkster Road, and to the west by Hannan Road.

== Demographics ==
Historical population
Census	Pop.	Note	%±
1970	22,900		—
1980	24,857		8.5%
1990	22,897		−7.9%
2000	22,979		0.4%
2010	23,989		4.4%
2020	25,178		5.0%
U.S. Decennial Census; 2018 Estimate

=== Racial and ethnic composition ===
Romulus city, Michigan – Racial and ethnic composition Note: the US Census treats Hispanic/Latino as an ethnic category. This table excludes Latinos from the racial categories and assigns them to a separate category. Hispanics/Latinos may be of any race.
Race / ethnicity (NH = Non-Hispanic)	Pop 2000	Pop 2010	Pop 2020	% 2000	% 2010	% 2020
White alone (NH)	14,773	11,752	10,318	64.29%	48.99%	40.98%
Black or African American alone (NH)	6,854	10,251	11,684	29.83%	42.73%	46.41%
Native American or Alaska Native alone (NH)	118	118	82	0.51%	0.49%	0.33%
Asian alone (NH)	135	256	326	0.59%	1.07%	1.29%
Native Hawaiian or Pacific Islander alone (NH)	18	12	10	0.08%	0.05%	0.04%
Other race alone (NH)	64	40	164	0.28%	0.17%	0.65%
Mixed race or Multiracial (NH)	554	830	1,484	2.41%	3.46%	5.89%
Hispanic or Latino (any race)	463	730	1,110	2.01%	3.04%	4.41%
Total	22,979	23,989	25,178	100.00%	100.00%	100.00%

=== 2020 census ===
As of the 2020 census, Romulus had a population of 25,178. The median age was 37.5 years. 24.2% of residents were under the age of 18 and 13.5% of residents were 65 years of age or older. For every 100 females there were 92.0 males, and for every 100 females age 18 and over there were 88.4 males age 18 and over.

99.5% of residents lived in urban areas, while 0.5% lived in rural areas.

There were 9,708 households in Romulus, of which 33.8% had children under the age of 18 living in them. Of all households, 36.5% were married-couple households, 20.6% were households with a male householder and no spouse or partner present, and 35.1% were households with a female householder and no spouse or partner present. About 27.2% of all households were made up of individuals and 9.3% had someone living alone who was 65 years of age or older.

There were 10,280 housing units, of which 5.6% were vacant. The homeowner vacancy rate was 1.9% and the rental vacancy rate was 5.5%.

Racial composition as of the 2020 census
Race	Number	Percent
White	10,595	42.1%
Black or African American	11,778	46.8%
American Indian and Alaska Native	106	0.4%
Asian	329	1.3%
Native Hawaiian and Other Pacific Islander	14	0.1%
Some other race	504	2.0%
Two or more races	1,852	7.4%

=== 2010 census ===
As of the census of 2010, there were 23,989 people, 8,975 households, and 6,135 families living in the city. The population density was 673.7 inhabitants per square mile (260.1/km^{2}). There were 9,946 housing units at an average density of 279.3 per square mile (107.8/km^{2}). The racial makeup of the city was 50.5% White, 43% African American, 0.5% Native American, 1.1% Asian, 0.1% Pacific Islander, 0.9% from other races, and 3.9% from two or more races. Hispanic or Latino residents of any race were 3.0% of the population.

There were 8,975 households, of which 37.8% had children under the age of 18 living with them, 40.7% were married couples living together, 21.1% had a female householder with no husband present, 6.6% had a male householder with no wife present, and 31.6% were non-families. 26.0% of all households were made up of individuals, and 8.2% had someone living alone who was 65 years of age or older. The average household size was 2.64 and the average family size was 3.16.

The median age in the city was 36.2 years. 26.8% of residents were under the age of 18; 9.2% were between the ages of 18 and 24; 27.4% were from 25 to 44; 27% were from 45 to 64; and 9.8% were 65 years of age or older. The populace was 48.4% male and 51.6% female.

=== 2000 census ===
As of the census of 2000, there were 22,979 people, 8,439 households, and 5,941 families living in the city. The population density was 639.9 inhabitants per square mile (247.1/km^{2}). There were 8,943 housing units at an average density of 249.0 per square mile (96.1/km^{2}). The racial makeup of the city was 65.36% White, 29.99% African American, 0.54% Native American, 0.59% Asian, 0.09% Pacific Islander, 0.81% from other races, and 2.63% from two or more races. Hispanic or Latino residents of any race were 2.01% of the population.

There were 8,439 households, out of which 36.7% had children under the age of 18 living with them, 46.5% were married couples living together, 18.5% had a female householder with no husband present, and 29.6% were non-families. 23.8% of all households were made up of individuals, and 7.2% had someone living alone who was 65 years of age or older. The average household size was 2.70 and the average family size was 3.19.

In the city, 29.2% of the population was under the age of 18, 8.4% was from 18 to 24, 31.7% from 25 to 44, 22.8% from 45 to 64, and 7.9% was 65 years of age or older. The median age was 33 years. For every 100 females, there were 95.1 males. For every 100 females age 18 and over, there were 92.6 males.

The median income for a household in the city was $45,088, and the median income for a family was $51,497. Males had a median income of $41,372 versus $27,517 for females. The per capita income for the city was $19,679. About 10.6% of families and 12.6% of the population were below the poverty line, including 16.8% of those under age 18 and 12.4% of those age 65 or over.

== Economy ==
In 1975, General Motors, opened the Romulus Engine plant on, producing V6 engines and 10-speed automatic transmissions for Chevrolet, Buick, GMC, and Cadillac vehicles.

In 2018, Amazon opened its DTW1 Fulfillment Center. Approximately 1,600 workers are employed at the site.

In 2021, grocery retailer Kroger built a $95 million automated fulfillment center to accommodate grocery shopping.

RKA Petroleum Companies is located here.

== Parks and recreation ==
Parks include:

- Beverly McAnally Park
- Elmer Johnson Park
- Fernandez Park
- Huron River Drive Passive Park
- Jimmy Raspberry Park
- Mary Ann Banks Park
- Oakbrook Park and Dog Park
- Opportunity Park - City Park
- Romulus Athlectic Center
- Romulus Historical Park
- Senior Center Park
- St. John's Lodge Park
- Tot-Lot Park
- Wickham Pocket Park

== Education ==
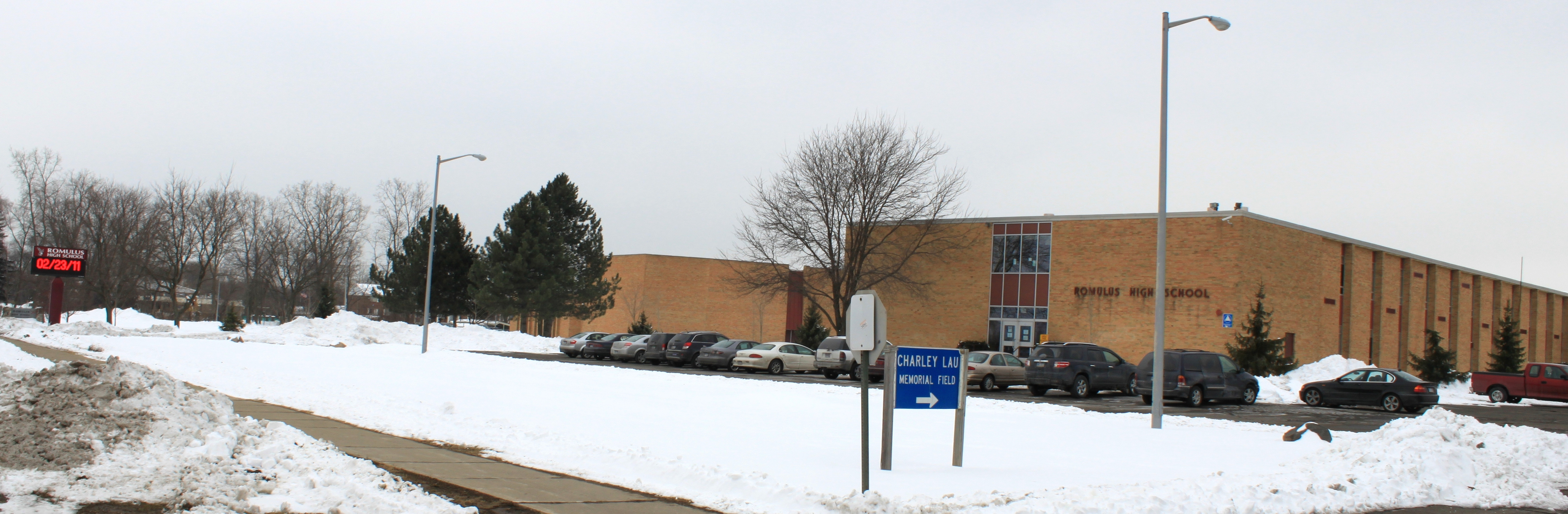
Romulus Senior High School

Public education is administered by the Romulus Community School District. Schools include Romulus Senior High School), a middle school, an early childhood center, and four elementary schools—Barth, Halecreek, Romulus, and Wick.

A portion is within the Wayne-Westland Community Schools.

Summit Academy Schools and Metro Charter Academy are charter schools that serves students in the Brownstown and Romulus areas respectfully.

The Roman Catholic Archdiocese of Detroit formerly operated the St. Aloysius School in Romulus.

== Media ==
In 2010, Meet Monica Velour, an independent comedy drama movie, was partially filmed in Romulus.

== Infrastructure ==
The Wayne County Airport Authority has its headquarters in the former L.C. Smith Terminal at Detroit Metropolitan Wayne County Airport in Romulus. It also has a police department.

== Notable people ==
- Charley Lau – professional baseball player and hitting coach
- John Long – professional basketball player
- Grant Long – professional basketball player
- Terry Mills – professional basketball player
- Fred Russell – professional football player
- Frank Sacka – professional baseball player (Washington Senators (1901–1960))
