= 2019 EuroLeague Final Four =

Basketball tournament

- The official logo was unveiled on 20 February 2019
- Season: 2018–19 EuroLeague

Tournament details
- Arena: Fernando Buesa Arena; Vitoria-Gasteiz, Spain
- Dates: 17–19 May 2019

Final positions
- Champions: (Russia) CSKA Moscow (8th title)
- Runners-up: (Turkey) Anadolu Efes
- Third place: (Spain) Real Madrid
- Fourth place: (Turkey) Fenerbahçe Beko

Awards and statistics
- MVP: (United States) Will Clyburn
- Top scorer(s): (Turkey) Shane Larkin (59 points)

The 2019 EuroLeague Final Four was the concluding EuroLeague Final Four tournament of the 2018–19 EuroLeague season, the 62nd season of Europe's premier club basketball tournament, and the 19th season since it was first organised by Euroleague Basketball. It was the 32nd Final Four of the modern EuroLeague Final Four era (1988–present), and the 34th time overall that the competition has concluded with a final four format. The Final Four was played at the Fernando Buesa Arena in Vitoria-Gasteiz, Spain, on 17 and 19 May 2019.

== Venue ==
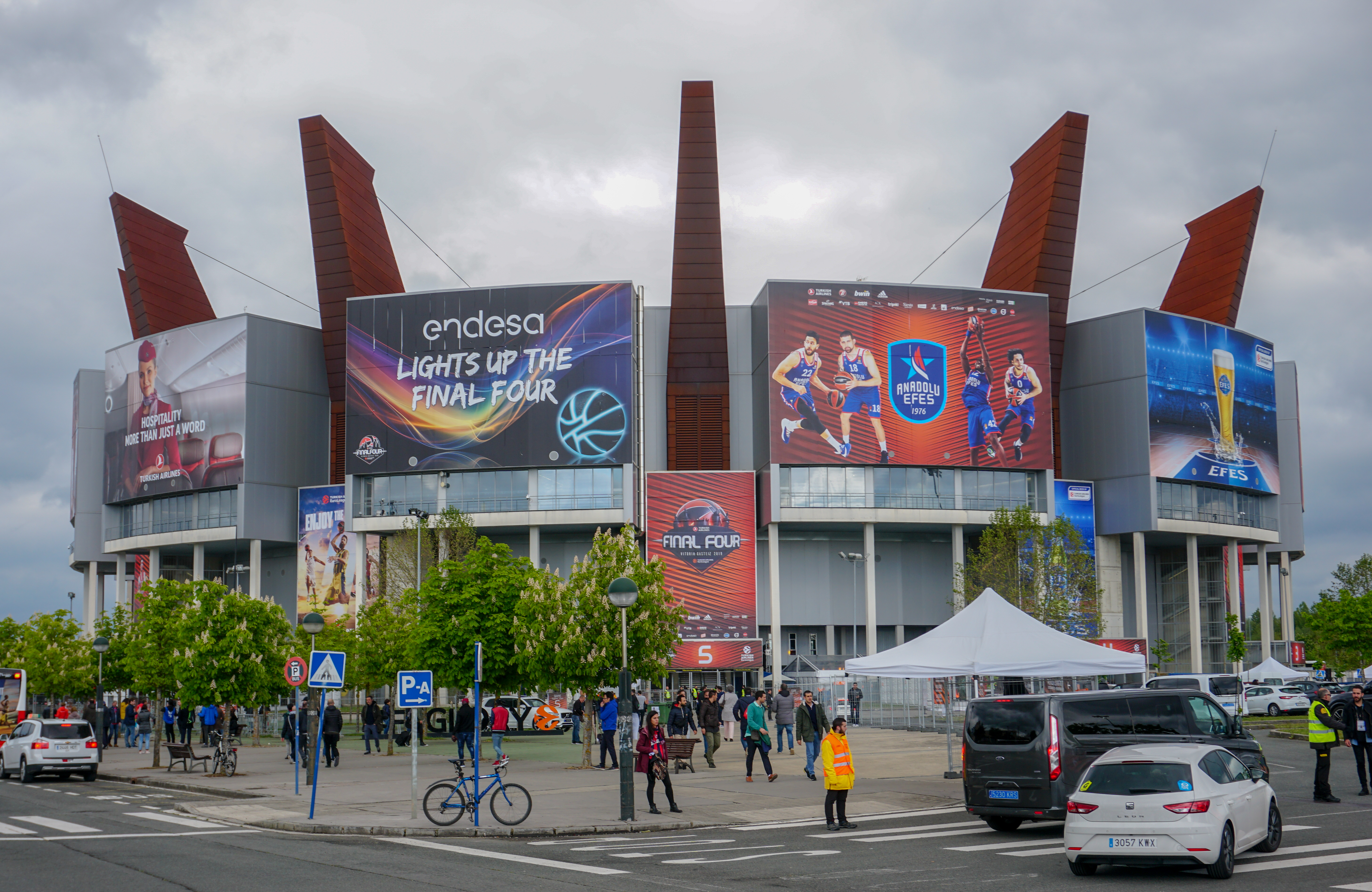
Outside view of the Fernando Buesa Arena during the Final Four

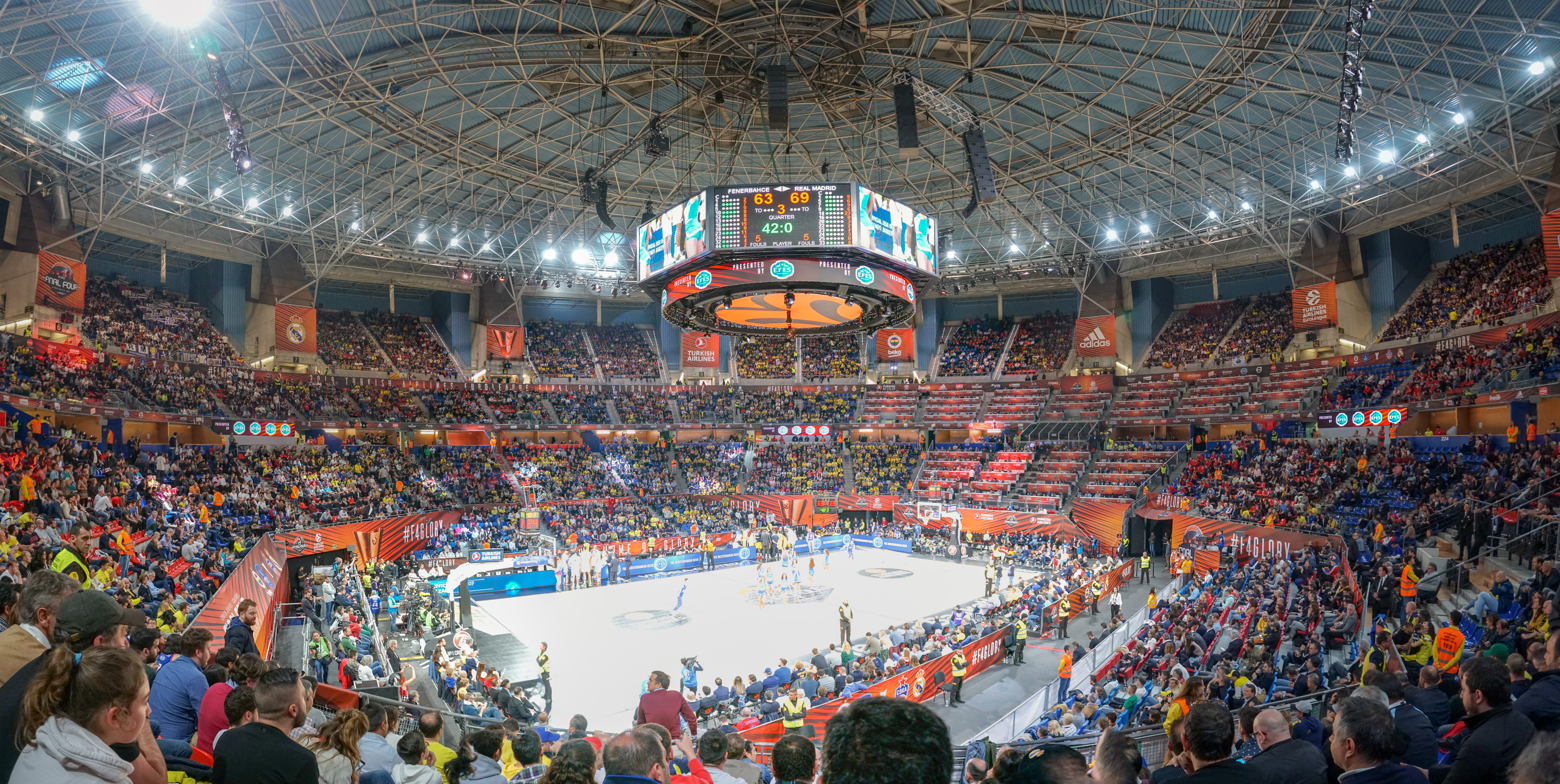
Interior view of the Fernando Buesa Arena during the Final Four

On May 15, 2018, Euroleague Basketball announced that the Final Four will be held in the Fernando Buesa Arena in Vitoria-Gasteiz. It was the first time ever the event would be hosted in Vitoria. The arena hosted the 1996 FIBA Saporta Cup Final, in which local Saski Baskonia won the title and also hosted the 2010 EuroCup Finals.

The Final Eight of the Copa del Rey (Spanish Cup) was played four times at Buesa Arena (2000, 2002, 2008 and 2013).

On 9 April 2012, at the game of Caja Laboral against Real Madrid, Fernando Buesa Arena registered the record of attendance in a basketball game of the Spanish Liga ACB with 15,504 spectators.

Vitoria-Gasteiz	2019 EuroLeague Final Four (Europe)
Fernando Buesa Arena	2019 EuroLeague Final Four (Europe)
Capacity: 15,716	2019 EuroLeague Final Four (Europe)

== Background ==
=== Real Madrid ===
Real Madrid failed to defend the title after finishing the regular season in the third position, with a 22–8 record, and being the first qualified team by beating Panathinaikos OPAP 3–0 in the playoffs. This was their seventh Final Four in the last nine editions and the third consecutive.

Coach Pablo Laso could have won his third title in his sixth Final Four appearance.

== Bracket ==
Semifinals
17 May
(Turkey) Fenerbahçe Beko	73
(Turkey) Anadolu Efes	92
17 May
(Russia) CSKA Moscow	95
(Spain) Real Madrid	90

Championship game
19 May
(Turkey) Anadolu Efes	83
(Russia) CSKA Moscow	91
Third place game
19 May
(Turkey) Fenerbahçe Beko	75
(Spain) Real Madrid	94

== Semifinals ==
=== Semifinal A ===
Turkish champions Fenerbahçe Beko returned to the Final Four to make it their fifth straight appearance. Led by head coach Željko Obradović, the all-time record holder for most EuroLeague championships won by a head coach, it defeated Žalgiris Kaunas 3–1 in the play-offs, to clinch a semi-final spot.

Anadolu Efes qualified for its first Final Four since 2001, this being their third appearance in total, after finishing the regular season in the 16 th (last) place the previous year. The club beat Barcelona Lassa 3–2 in the play-offs.

Larkin set a new EuroLeague Final Four record for Performance Index Rating with 43.

17 May 2019	Fenerbahçe Beko (Turkey)	73–92	(Turkey) Anadolu Efes	Vitoria-Gasteiz, Spain
18:00 (CEST)	Scoring by quarter: 20–19, 20–26, 17–23, 16–24
	Pts: Veselý 14; Rebs: Melli 4 Asts: Gudurić 6 PIR: Kalinić 15	Boxscore	Pts: Larkin 30; Rebs: Dunston 10; Asts: Larkin 7 PIR: Larkin 43	Arena: Fernando Buesa Arena; Attendance: 13,470; Referees: (Italy) Luigi Lamonica, (Latvia) Oļegs Latiševs, (France) Mehdi Difallah

Starters:			Pts	Reb	Ast
PG	35	(Turkey) Ali Muhammed	4	2	3
SG	1	(United States) Erick Green	13	0	1
SF	23	(Serbia) Marko Gudurić	8	2	6
PF	4	(Italy) Nicolò Melli	9	4	2
C	44	(Jordan) Ahmet Düverioğlu	0	2	1
Reserves:					
PF	5	(Turkey) Barış Hersek	DNP		
SG	10	(Turkey) Melih Mahmutoğlu	5	3	1
SF	12	(Serbia) Nikola Kalinić	12	3	2
F	13	(Turkey) Tarık Biberovic	0	0	0
PG	16	(Greece) Kostas Sloukas	8	3	2
C	24	(Czech Republic) Jan Veselý	14	2	2
PG	32	(Turkey) Sinan Güler	0	0	0
Head coach:
(Basketball Federation of Serbia) Željko Obradović

Fenerbahçe	Anadolu Efes

Fenerbahçe	Statistics	A. Efes
21/42 (50%)	2-pt field goals	17/30 (50.7%)
6/21 (28.6%)	3-pt field goals	14/32 (43.8%)
13/16 (81.3%)	Free throws	16/20 (80%)
6	Offensive rebounds	12
19	Defensive rebounds	31
25	Total rebounds	43
20	Assists	13
5	Turnovers	10
5	Steals	5
2	Blocks	1
24	Fouls	18

Starters:			Pts	Reb	Ast
PG	0	(Turkey) Shane Larkin	30	7	7
SG	22	(Serbia) Vasilije Micić	25	5	1
SF	44	(Croatia) Krunoslav Simon	0	1	0
PF	18	(France) Adrien Moerman	7	5	2
C	42	(Armenia) Bryant Dunston	9	10	0
Reserves:					
G	1	(France) Rodrigue Beaubois	2	2	2
PG	4	(Turkey) Doğuş Balbay	0	0	0
PF	12	(Australia) Brock Motum	9	4	0
C	15	(Turkey) Sertaç Şanlı	DNP		
G	19	(Turkey) Buğrahan Tuncer	DNP		
C	21	(Germany) Tibor Pleiß	0	2	1
SF	23	(United States) James Anderson	10	5	0
Head coach:
(Turkish Basketball Federation) Ergin Ataman

=== Semifinal B ===
Russian champions CSKA Moscow returned to the Final Four to make it their eighth consecutive Final Four appearance. The club beat Kirolbet Baskonia 3–1 in the play-offs.

Defending Euroleague and spanish champions Real Madrid would play its third consecutive Final Four appearance. The match would be a re-match of the 2018 Semifinal A, which Real Madrid won on their way to their 10th title. Real Madrid beat Panathinaikos OPAP 3–0 in the play-offs.

17 May 2019	CSKA Moscow (Russia)	95–90	(Spain) Real Madrid	Vitoria-Gasteiz, Spain
21:00 (CEST)	Scoring by quarter: 18–22, 25–23, 22–28, 30–17
	Pts: De Colo, Rodríguez 23; Rebs: three players 5 Asts: Rodríguez 4 PIR: De Colo 27	Boxscore	Pts: Causeur 18; Rebs: Tavares 9 Asts: Campazzo 6 PIR: Causeur 17	Arena: Fernando Buesa Arena; Attendance: 13,199; Referees: (Slovenia) Matej Boltauzer, (Ukraine) Borys Ryzhyk, (Germany) Anne Panther

Starters:			Pts	Reb	Ast
PG	1	(France) Nando de Colo	23	4	2
SG	23	(Italy) Daniel Hackett	3	3	2
SF	21	(United States) Will Clyburn	18	5	1
PF	41	(Russia) Nikita Kurbanov	0	2	0
C	44	(United States) Othello Hunter	8	5	0
Reserves:					
F	3	(Russia) Joel Bolomboy	0	0	0
F	5	(United States) Alec Peters	3	5	1
G	7	(Russia) Ivan Ukhov	DNP		
PG	13	(Spain) Sergio Rodríguez	23	0	4
PF	20	(Russia) Andrey Vorontsevich	DNP		
G	22	(United States) Cory Higgins	11	3	1
C	42	(United States) Kyle Hines	6	4	0
Head coach:
(Hellenic Basketball Federation) Dimitrios Itoudis

CSKA Moscow	Real Madrid

CSKA	Statistics	R.Madrid
17/38 (44.7%)	2-pt field goals	24/46 (52.2%)
9/18 (50%)	3-pt field goals	7/24 (29.2%)
34/42 (81%)	Free throws	21/24 (87.5%)
6	Offensive rebounds	11
25	Defensive rebounds	24
31	Total rebounds	35
11	Assists	16
8	Turnovers	8
2	Steals	4
2	Blocks	7
22	Fouls	32

Starters:			Pts	Reb	Ast
PG	7	(Argentina) Facundo Campazzo	10	2	6
SG	5	(Spain) Rudy Fernández	10	2	4
SF	44	(Sweden) Jeffery Taylor	3	2	1
PF	3	(Slovenia) Anthony Randolph	12	5	0
C	22	(Cape Verde) Edy Tavares	6	9	0
Reserves:					
SG	1	(France) Fabien Causeur	18	2	1
PF	9	(Spain) Felipe Reyes	DNP		
C	14	(Mexico) Gustavo Ayón	2	2	1
SG	20	(Azerbaijan) Jaycee Carroll	5	1	0
PG	23	(Spain) Sergio Llull	13	2	2
SF	24	(Argentina) Gabriel Deck	2	2	0
PF	33	(United States) Trey Thompkins	9	6	1
Head coach:
(Spanish Basketball Federation) Pablo Laso

== Third place game ==
Fenerbahçe and Real Madrid faced off in a re-match of the 2018 championship game. Facundo Campazzo set an all-time record for assists in a Final Four game, with 15. He surpassed Terrell McIntyre's record from 2008.

19 May 2019	Fenerbahçe Beko (Turkey)	75–94	(Spain) Real Madrid	Vitoria-Gasteiz, Spain
17:30 (CEST)	Scoring by quarter: 16–24, 24–14, 23–31, 12–25
	Pts: Sloukas 17; Rebs: Düverioğlu 9 Asts: Sloukas 6 PIR: Sloukas 18	Boxscore	Pts: Ayón 23; Rebs: Ayón 11; Asts: Campazzo 15; PIR: Ayón 36	Arena: Fernando Buesa Arena; Attendance: 12,866; Referees: (Slovenia) Matej Boltauzer, (Portugal) Fernando Rocha, (France) Mehdi Difallah

Starters:			Pts	Reb	Ast
PG	32	(Turkey) Sinan Güler	4	0	2
SG	1	(United States) Erick Green	4	0	0
SF	23	(Serbia) Marko Gudurić	11	1	2
PF	12	(Serbia) Nikola Kalinić	8	3	0
C	44	(Jordan) Ahmet Düverioğlu	4	9	2
Reserves:					
PF	4	(Italy) Nicolò Melli	7	5	0
PF	5	(Turkey) Barış Hersek	DNP		
SG	10	(Turkey) Melih Mahmutoğlu	14	2	3
F	13	(Turkey) Tarık Biberovic	0	0	0
PG	16	(Greece) Kostas Sloukas	17	1	6
SF	18	(Turkey) Egehan Arna	0	1	0
C	24	(Czech Republic) Jan Veselý	6	0	0
Head coach:
(Basketball Federation of Serbia) Željko Obradović

Fenerbahçe	Real Madrid

Fenerbahçe	Statistics	R.Madrid
16/32 (50%)	2-pt field goals	23/35 (65.7%)
10/27 (37%)	3-pt field goals	11/21 (52.4%)
13/15 (86.7%)	Free throws	15/19 (78.9%)
5	Offensive rebounds	6
18	Defensive rebounds	28
23	Total rebounds	34
15	Assists	30
11	Turnovers	7
7	Steals	12
2	Blocks	4
22	Fouls	19

Starters:			Pts	Reb	Ast
PG	7	(Argentina) Facundo Campazzo	12	3	15
SG	20	(Azerbaijan) Jaycee Carroll	8	0	0
SF	5	(Spain) Rudy Fernández	6	2	5
PF	9	(Spain) Felipe Reyes	6	2	0
C	14	(Mexico) Gustavo Ayón	23	11	3
Reserves:					
SG	1	(France) Fabien Causeur	13	2	2
SF	16	(Spain) Santiago Yusta	2	0	0
C	22	(Cape Verde) Edy Tavares	2	4	1
PG	23	(Spain) Sergio Llull	4	2	1
SF	24	(Argentina) Gabriel Deck	3	3	0
SG	25	(Slovenia) Klemen Prepelič	3	0	1
PF	33	(United States) Trey Thompkins	12	5	2
Head coach:
(Spanish Basketball Federation) Pablo Laso

== Championship game ==
The seven-time EuroLeague champions CSKA Moscow advanced to the championship game for the seventh time and first since 2016 EuroLeague Final Four. Anadolu Efes advance to the Final Four Championship Game for the first time in their history, having finished third in both previous Euroleague Final Four participations. Remarkable was that in the previous season, Efes finished sixteenth and last in the EuroLeague.

Shane Larkin broke the record for most points scored in a Final Four, with 59 total.

19 May 2019	Anadolu Efes (Turkey)	83–91	(Russia) CSKA Moscow	Vitoria-Gasteiz, Spain
20:30 (CEST)	Scoring by quarter: 20–29, 22–15, 20–24, 21–23
	Pts: Larkin 29; Rebs: Dunston, Simon 10; Asts: Micić 5 PIR: Larkin 24	Boxscore	Pts: Higgins, Clyburn 20; Rebs: Three players 5 Asts: Hackett 5 PIR: Higgins 23	Arena: Fernando Buesa Arena; Attendance: 13,420; Referees: (Germany) Robert Lottermoser, (Italy) Luigi Lamonica, (Latvia) Oļegs Latiševs

Starters:			Pts	Reb	Ast
PG	0	(Turkey) Shane Larkin	29	1	2
SG	22	(Serbia) Vasilije Micić	10	0	5
SF	23	(United States) James Anderson	7	0	0
PF	18	(France) Adrien Moerman	2	3	0
C	42	(Armenia) Bryant Dunston	13	10	2
Reserves:					
G	1	(France) Rodrigue Beaubois	3	0	0
PG	4	(Turkey) Doğuş Balbay	0	0	0
PF	12	(Australia) Brock Motum	4	3	0
C	15	(Turkey) Sertaç Şanlı	0	0	0
G	19	(Turkey) Buğrahan Tuncer	DNP		
C	21	(Germany) Tibor Pleiß	0	1	0
SF	44	(Croatia) Krunoslav Simon	15	10	2
Head coach:
(Turkish Basketball Federation) Ergin Ataman

Anadolu Efes	CSKA Moscow

A. Efes	Statistics	CSKA
15/40 (37.5%)	2-pt field goals	17/32 (53.1%)
11/30 (36.7%)	3-pt field goals	14/22 (63.6%)
20/22 (90.9%)	Free throws	15/18 (83.3%)
19	Offensive rebounds	8
17	Defensive rebounds	27
36	Total rebounds	35
12	Assists	18
9	Turnovers	11
4	Steals	3
2	Blocks	2
22	Fouls	22

2018–19 EuroLeague champions

CSKA Moscow
8th title

Starters:			Pts	Reb	Ast
PG	1	(France) Nando de Colo	15	4	4
SG	23	(Italy) Daniel Hackett	7	3	5
SF	21	(United States) Will Clyburn	20	5	2
PF	41	(Russia) Nikita Kurbanov	7	5	3
C	44	(United States) Othello Hunter	7	1	0
Reserves:					
F	3	(Russia) Joel Bolomboy	0	2	0
F	5	(United States) Alec Peters	0	0	0
G	7	(Russia) Ivan Ukhov	0	0	0
PG	13	(Spain) Sergio Rodríguez	6	2	0
PF	20	(Russia) Andrey Vorontsevich	DNP		
G	22	(United States) Cory Higgins	20	3	2
C	42	(United States) Kyle Hines	9	5	2
Head coach:
(Hellenic Basketball Federation) Dimitrios Itoudis

- Team captains (C): (Turkey) Doğuş Balbay (Anadolu Efes) and (United States) Kyle Hines (CSKA Moscow)
