= Nando de Colo =

French basketball player (born 1987)

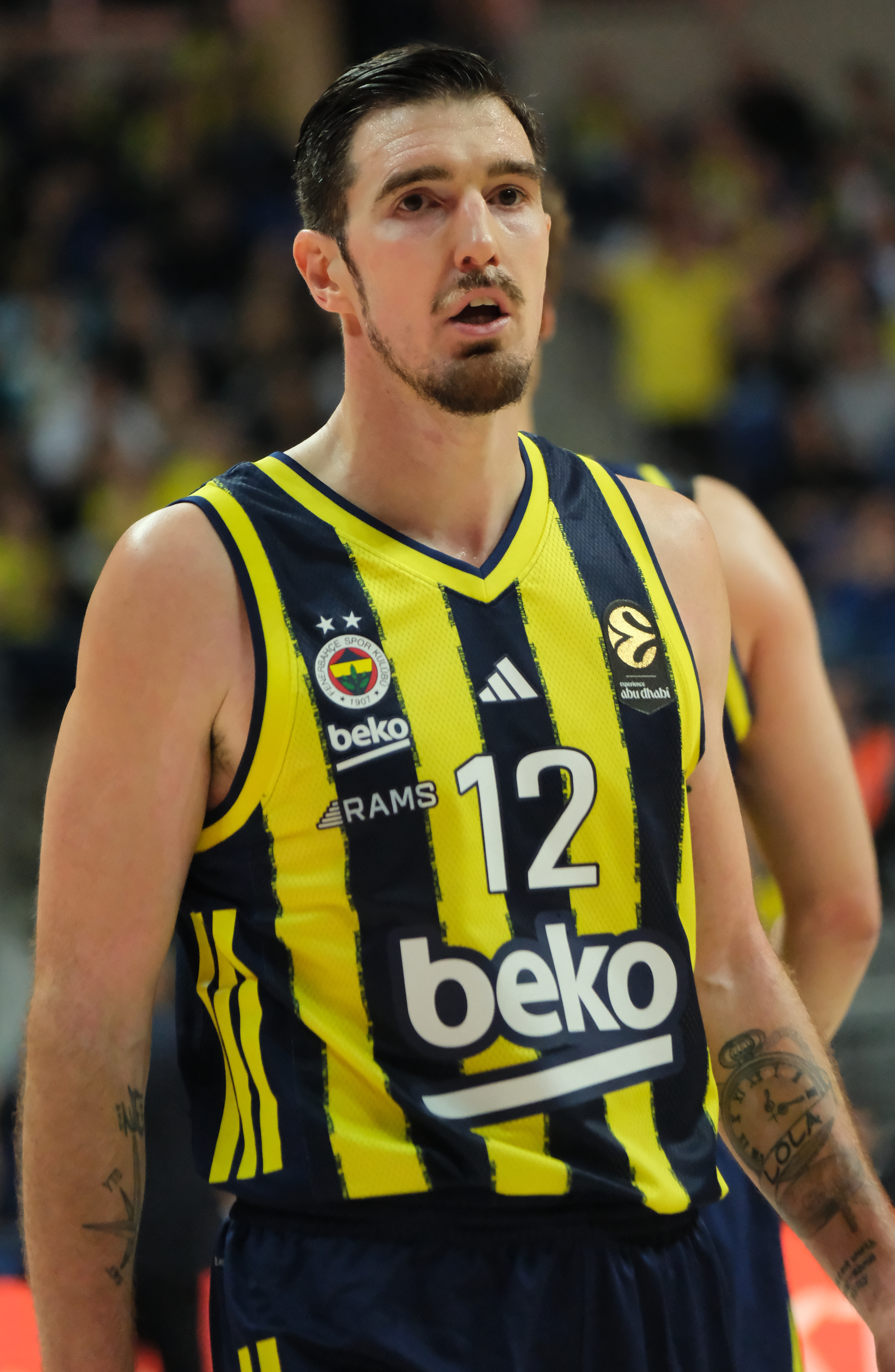
- De Colo with Fenerbahçe in 2026

Personal information
- Born: 23 June 1987 (age 39) Sainte-Catherine-lès-Arras, France
- Listed height: 6 ft 5 in (1.96 m)
- Listed weight: 200 lb (91 kg)

Career information
- NBA draft: 2009: 2nd round, 53rd overall pick
- Drafted by: San Antonio Spurs
- Playing career: 2006–2026
- Position: Point guard / shooting guard
- Number: 12

Career history
- 2006–2009: Cholet
- 2009–2012: Valencia
- 2012–2014: San Antonio Spurs
- 2012–2014: →Austin Toros
- 2014: Toronto Raptors
- 2014–2019: CSKA Moscow
- 2019–2022: Fenerbahçe
- 2022–2025: ASVEL
- 2026: Fenerbahçe

Career highlights
- 2× EuroLeague champion (2016, 2019); EuroLeague MVP (2016); EuroLeague Final Four MVP (2016); 3× All-EuroLeague First Team (2016–2018); 3× All-EuroLeague Second Team (2015, 2019, 2021); Alphonso Ford EuroLeague Top Scorer Trophy (2016); EuroLeague 2010–2020 All-Decade Team (2020); EuroLeague 25th Anniversary Team (2025); EuroCup champion (2010); All-EuroCup First Team (2010); 7× EuroLeague 50–40–90 club (2015–2021); 5 VTB United League champion (2015–2019); 6× Russian League champion (2014-2019); 2× Turkish Super League champion (2022, 2026); 2× Turkish Cup winner (2020, 2026); 2× LNB Pro A Leaders Cup winner (2008, 2023); 5× Gomelsky Cup winner (2014–2016, 2018, 2019); LNB Pro A MVP (2008); 3× VTB United League MVP (2015, 2016, 2018); VTB United League Playoffs MVP (2017); VTB United League Hall of Fame (2021); 5× All-VTB United League First Team (2015–2019); All-LNB Pro A Team (2023); 2× French League Cup MVP (2008,2023); 2× French Player of the Year (2015, 2016); LNB Pro A Most Improved Player (2008); LNB All-Star MVP (2007); 2× LNB All-Star (2007, 2008, 2024); Manila Olympic Qualifying Tournament MVP (2016)
- Stats at NBA.com
- Stats at Basketball Reference
Medals
Men's basketball
Representing France
Summer Olympics
Silver medal – second place	2020 Tokyo	Team
Silver medal – second place	2024 Paris	Team
FIBA World Cup
Bronze medal – third place	2019 China
EuroBasket
Gold medal – first place	2013 Slovenia
Silver medal – second place	2011 Lithuania
Bronze medal – third place	2015 France–Croatia–Germany–Latvia

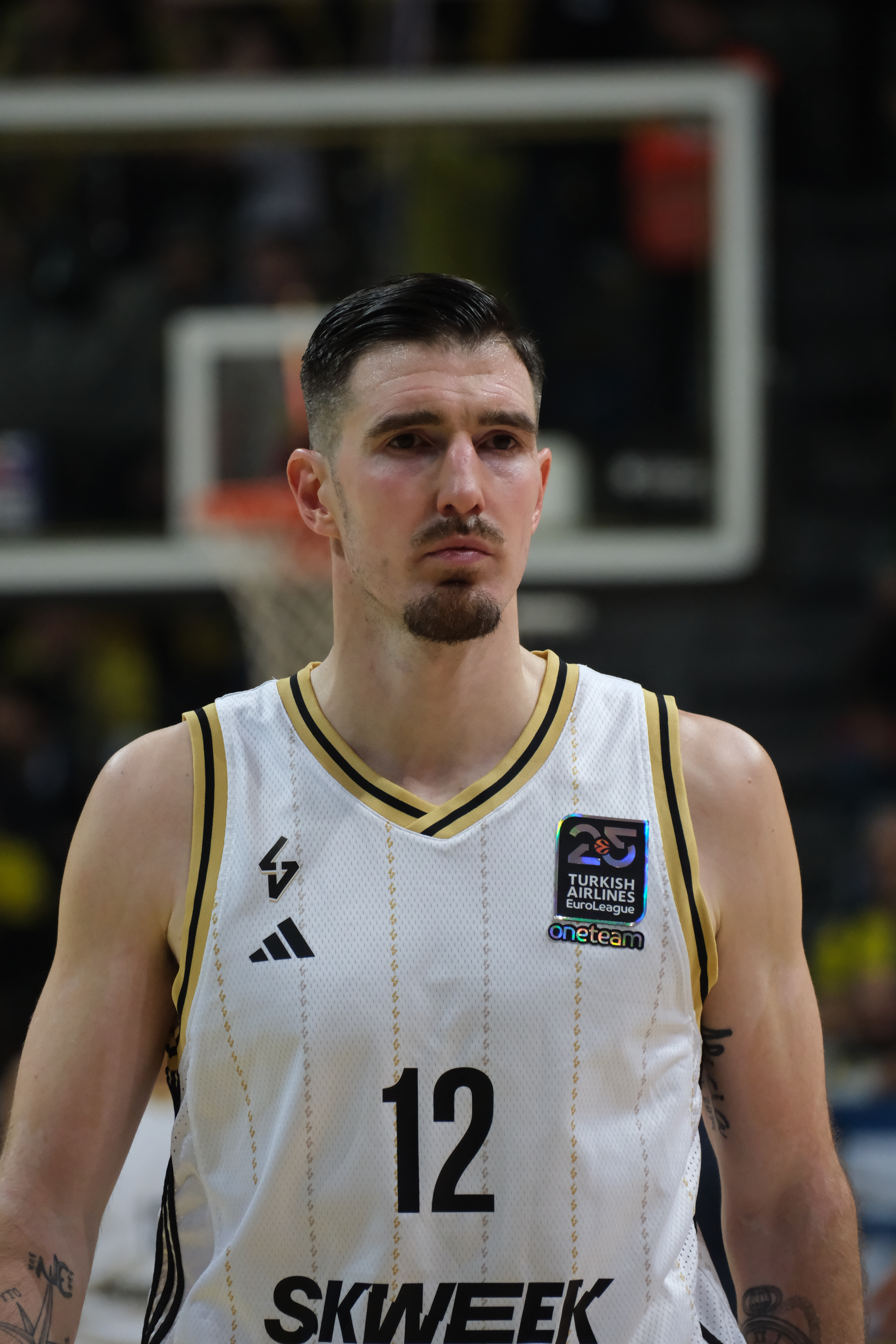
de Colo with ASVEL in 2025

Nando Bruno Alfred Andre de Colo (born 23 June 1987) is a French former professional basketball player. Standing at a height of 6 ft 5 in (1.96 m), he played at the point guard and shooting guard positions. A six-time All-EuroLeague selection, de Colo won the EuroLeague title in 2016 and 2019 with CSKA Moscow, earning both the EuroLeague MVP and Final Four MVP awards in the process.

De Colo is the all-time top scorer in European continental basketball competitions, having surpassed Nikos Galis in 2022.

== Early life ==
De Colo was born in Sainte-Catherine-lès-Arras, France to parents who were both born and raised in Portugal. He attended Lycée Fernand Renaudeau in Cholet, and made his first appearance on the Cholet Under-20 team in 2004–05.

== Professional career ==
=== Cholet Basket (2006–2009) ===
De Colo made his professional debut during the 2006–07 season with Cholet Basket of the LNB Pro A. Under supervision of head coach Erman Kunter, he helped the team win the 2008 Semaine des As (French A Leaders Cup) and reach the finals of the 2008 French Cup and of the 2009 EuroChallenge.

On 1 June 2009, he parted ways with Cholet. On 25 June 2009, he was selected with the 53rd overall pick in the 2009 NBA draft by the San Antonio Spurs.

=== Valencia (2009–2012) ===
On 13 July 2009, he signed a three-year deal with Valencia of Spain. He went on to win the 2010 EuroCup title with Valencia and selected All-EuroCup First Team.

=== San Antonio Spurs (2012–2014) ===
On 10 July 2012, De Colo announced he would not be re-signing with Valencia in order to play in the NBA. On 13 July 2012, he signed a two-year deal with the San Antonio Spurs. During his rookie and sophomore seasons, he had multiple assignments with the Austin Toros of the NBA D-League. De Colo reached the 2013 NBA Finals with the Spurs, but the team lost to the Miami Heat in seven games.

=== Toronto Raptors (2014) ===
On 20 February 2014, De Colo was traded to the Toronto Raptors in exchange for Austin Daye.

=== CSKA Moscow (2014–2019) ===
On 9 July 2014, De Colo signed a two-year deal (with the third year being optional) with the Russian club CSKA Moscow of the VTB United League. In May 2015, he was chosen to the All-EuroLeague Second Team, for his performances over the season.

In the 2014–15 season, CSKA Moscow managed to advance to the EuroLeague Final Four, for the fourth straight season, after eliminating Panathinaikos for the second straight season in the EuroLeague quarterfinals playoffs series, with a 3–1 series victory. However, in the EuroLeague Final Four's semi-final game, despite being dubbed by the media as an absolute favorite to advance to the Finals, CSKA once again lost to Olympiacos. The final score was 70–68, after a great Olympiacos comeback in the 4th quarter, which was led by Vassilis Spanoulis. CSKA Moscow eventually won the third place game, after defeating Fenerbahçe, by a score of 86–80. In his second EuroLeague season, De Colo averaged a career-high 14.4 points, 3.2 rebounds, and 3.1 assists per game, over 28 games played. On 21 May 2015, De Colo won the VTB United League MVP Award. CSKA Moscow finished the season by winning the VTB United League championship, after eliminating Khimki, with a 3–0 series sweep in the league's finals series.

On 3 May 2016, De Colo was awarded with the Alphonso Ford EuroLeague Top Scorer Trophy, an annual award given to the EuroLeague's top scorer of the season. Nine days later, he was named the EuroLeague MVP. On 15 May, CSKA won the EuroLeague title, and De Colo was named the EuroLeague Final Four MVP.

On 15 June 2016, De Colo signed a new three-year contract with CSKA. He was named the 2016 All-Europe Player of the Year by Eurobasket.com.

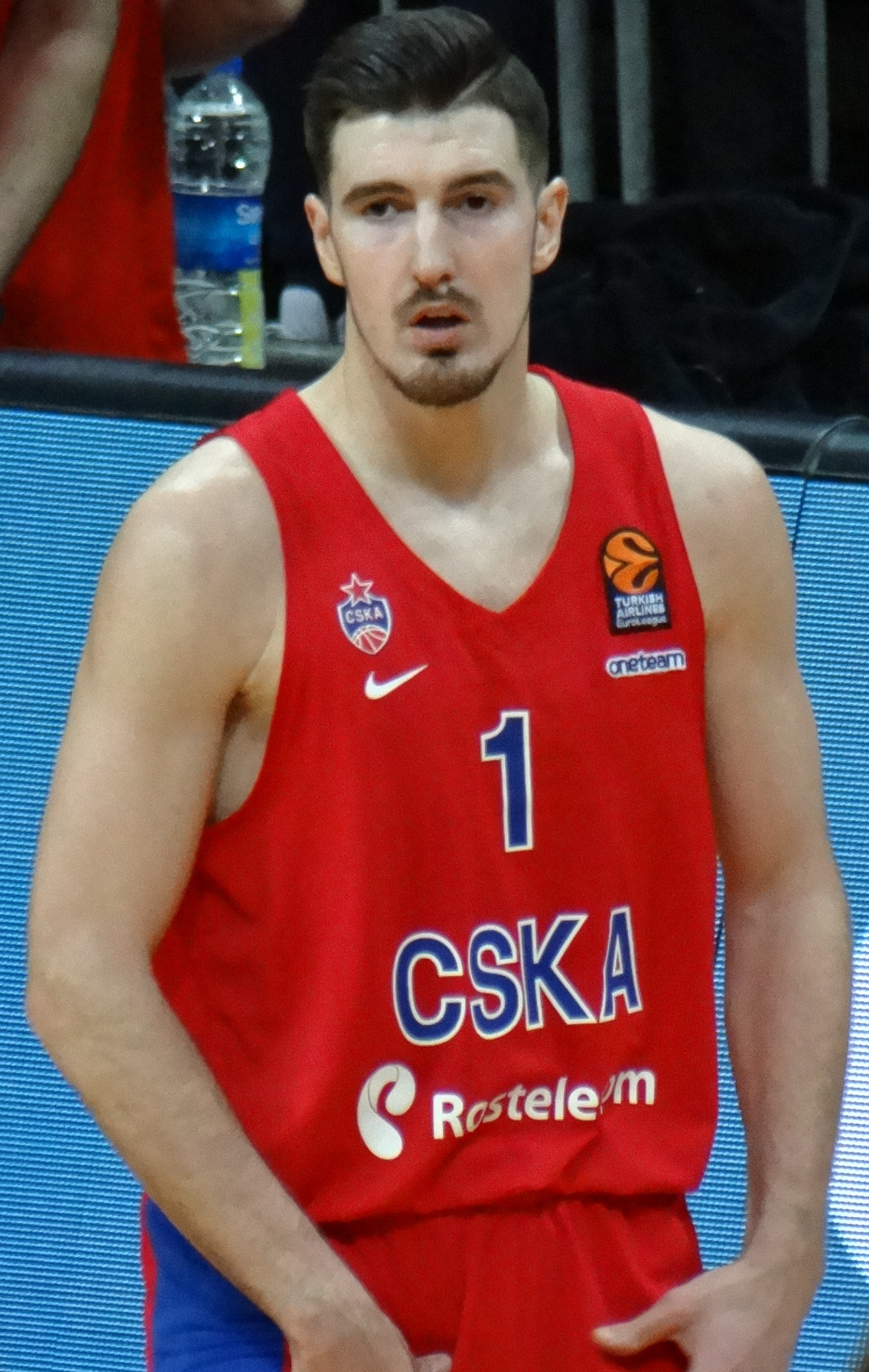
De Colo in 2018

In May 2018, he was named the All-EuroLeague First Team for the 2017–18 season. On June 9, 2018, he won his third VTB United League MVP award.

In the 2018–19 season, De Colo won his second EuroLeague title with CSKA after defeating Anadolu Efes in the championship game of the Final Four. Moscow also went on to win the VTB United League once again, making it his fifth league title.

=== Fenerbahçe (2019–2022) ===
On July 6, 2019, de Colo signed with Fenerbahçe of the Turkish Basketball Super League and the EuroLeague, on a 2+1 deal. On October 19, 2019, de Colo set personal career-high with 39 points in a EuroLeague win over Baskonia. In his first season with the club, he averaged 15.9 points, 3 rebounds and 3 assists over 24 EuroLeague games. The season was cut short due to COVID-19 pandemic.

In 2020–21 season, over 32 EuroLeague games, de Colo averaged 15.8 points, 3.9 assists and 3.2 rebounds per game. In December 2021, he suffered a fracture in the second metacarpal bone of his left hand, which will keep him off the court for weeks after surgery is performed.

=== ASVEL (2022–2025) ===
On 30 June 2022, De Colo signed a two-year deal with ASVEL of the French LNB Pro A and the EuroLeague. Prior to signing he was also talking with Monaco and Valencia.

On February 5, 2023, De Colo surpassed Nikos Galis as the all-time top scorer in European continental basketball competitions with 4,917 points.

On May 17, 2023, De Colo was named to the All-French League Team.

=== Return to Fenerbahçe (2026) ===
On 4 January 2026, de Colo signed a contract with Fenerbahçe until the end of season. De Colo ended his career by helping Fenerbahçe win the 2025–26 Basketbol Süper Ligi.

== Career statistics ==
Legend
GP	Games played	GS	Games started	MPG	Minutes per game
FG%	Field-goal percentage	3P%	3-point field-goal percentage	FT%	Free-throw percentage
RPG	Rebounds per game	APG	Assists per game	SPG	Steals per game
BPG	Blocks per game	PPG	Points per game	PIR	Performance index rating
**Bold**	Career high

=== NBA ===
==== Regular season ====
Year	Team	GP	GS	MPG	FG%	3P%	FT%	RPG	APG	SPG	BPG	PPG
2012–13	San Antonio	**72**	**6**	**12.8**	.436	**.378**	.795	**1.9**	**1.9**	**.6**	**.1**	3.8
2013–14	San Antonio	26	3	11.6	**.452**	.323	.818	1.7	1.2	**.6**	**.1**	**4.3**
2013–14	Toronto	21	0	9.2	.367	.364	**1.000**	1.3	1.6	.3	**.1**	3.1
Career		119	9	11.9	.429	.363	.835	1.8	1.7	.5	.1	3.8

==== Playoffs ====
Year	Team	GP	GS	MPG	FG%	3P%	FT%	RPG	APG	SPG	BPG	PPG
2013	San Antonio	**5**	0	2.8	**.250**	.000	**1.000**	.8	**.4**	—	—	**0.8**
2014	Toronto	1	0	**4.0**	—	—	—	**1.0**	—	—	—	0.0
Career		6	0	3.0	.250	.000	1.000	.8	.3	—	—	0.7

=== EuroLeague ===
†	Denotes season in which De Colo won the EuroLeague
*	Led the league
‡	EuroLeague record

Year	Team	GP	GS	MPG	FG%	3P%	FT%	RPG	APG	SPG	BPG	PPG	PIR
2010–11	Valencia	19	0	21.5	.335	.276	.957*	2.6	1.6	**1.4**	**.2**	10.1	8.2
2014–15	CSKA Moscow	28	10	24.4	.493	.471	.920	3.2	3.1	1.3	.0	14.4	16.6
2015–16†	CSKA Moscow	27	27	27.7	.526	.460	.908	**3.6**	**5.0**	1.1	.1	**19.4***	**24.3***
2016–17	CSKA Moscow	28	23	27.1	.516	.426	.959*	2.9	3.9	1.0	.0	19.1	20.8
2017–18	CSKA Moscow	32	15	27.1	.542	**.492**	.950	2.3	3.7	1.3	.1	16.7	18.9
2018–19†	CSKA Moscow	**34**	24	24.3	.500	.431	.946	2.5	3.4	.9	—	14.7	16.4
2019–20	Fenerbahçe	24	17	**28.7**	**.576**	.400	.956	3.0	3.0	.6	.0	15.9	16.5
2020–21	Fenerbahçe	32	**31**	27.5	.516	.403	.936	3.2	3.9	**1.4**	.0	15.8	18.8
2021–22	Fenerbahçe	21	5	22.1	.478	.316	.871	2.2	3.8	1.3	**.2**	11.9	14.1
2022–23	ASVEL	29	24	23.7	.477	.411	.917	2.6	3.5	1.0	.0	13.8	15.5
2023–24	ASVEL	21	3	21.9	.418	.380	.877	1.8	4.1	1.1	.0	12.1	13.7
2024–25	ASVEL	32	0	20.6	.448	.387	.948	1.7	4.5	.8	.0	11.5	11.7
2025–26	ASVEL	13	8	20.6	.500	.400	**.983**	2.1	4.7	1.0	**.2**	13.6	17.8
2025–26	Fenerbahçe	17	0	17.4	.555	.468	.972	1.4	2.4	.2	.1	9.8	9.9
Career		357	187	24.3	.492	.411	.935‡	2.6	3.7	1.1	.1	14.5	16.5

=== EuroCup ===
Year	Team	GP	GS	MPG	FG%	3P%	FT%	RPG	APG	SPG	BPG	PPG	PIR
2009–10	Valencia	14	**14**	**28.8**	**.441**	**.413**	.837	**4.0**	2.4	1.3	**.1**	**13.6**	**13.5**
2011–12	Valencia	**16**	8	24.9	.432	.379	**.861**	2.0	**3.7**	**1.6**	—	11.3	11.5
Career		30	22	26.8	.437	.397	.848	2.9	3.1	1.4	.1	12.4	12.4

=== Domestic leagues ===
Year	Team	League	GP	MPG	FG%	3P%	FT%	RPG	APG	SPG	BPG	PPG
2006–07	(France) Cholet	Pro A	32	21.0	.482	.365	.895	2.3	1.8	1.0	.0	7.0
2007–08	(France) Cholet	Pro A	31	28.5	.452	.393	.861	2.9	3.4	1.8	.1	14.8
2008–09	(France) Cholet	Pro A	27	28.2	.444	.352	.875	3.6	3.3	1.0	.1	14.7
2009–10	(Spain) Valencia	ACB	33	26.0	.462	.387	.915	2.8	2.3	1.2	.8	13.2
2010–11	(Spain) Valencia	ACB	32	19.8	.474	.275	.918	2.3	2.1	1.0	.1	10.3
2011–12	(Spain) Valencia	ACB	41	27.1	.424	.360	.864	3.0	2.9	1.5	.0	13.5
2012–13	(United States) Austin Toros	D-League	3	34.8	.380	.235	1.000	5.7	7.3	2.0	—	15.3
2013–14	(United States) Austin Toros	D-League	8	35.9	.496	.257	.933	6.5	5.4	2.4	.4	21.9
2014–15	(Russia) CSKA Moscow	VTBUL	32	23.3	.527	.441	.899	3.5	3.3	1.4	.1	14.6
2015–16	(Russia) CSKA Moscow	VTBUL	36	23.2	.499	.390	.958	3.4	4.6	1.5	.1	16.6
2016–17	(Russia) CSKA Moscow	VTBUL	24	22.8	.567	.411	.920	2.5	4.4	1.2	.0	17.3
2017–18	(Russia) CSKA Moscow	VTBUL	26	22.5	.547	.476	.940	2.6	4.2	1.1	.1	16.6
2018–19	(Russia) CSKA Moscow	VTBUL	25	22.1	.545	.474	.943	2.4	3.4	1.0	.1	15.5
2019–20	(Turkey) Fenerbahçe	TBSL	13	28.4	.549	.469	.844	3.3	3.4	1.5	.1	17.4
2020–21	(Turkey) Fenerbahçe	TBSL	17	26.6	.508	.351	.929	3.1	5.5	.9	.1	18.1
2021–22	(Turkey) Fenerbahçe	TBSL	21	23.5	.513	.446	.948	2.3	4.7	1.1	.0	15.0
2022–23	(France) ASVEL	LNB Élite	29	20.9	.537	.458	.944	2.2	3.9	.8	.0	15.3
2023–24	(France) ASVEL	LNB Élite	22	18.3	.465	.432	.910	2.0	4.1	.9	.0	10.7
2024–25	(France) ASVEL	LNB Élite	34	18.5	.436	.371	.931	1.4	4.0	.8	.0	9.0
2025–26	(France) ASVEL	LNB Élite	8	17.5	.378	.233	1.000	1.5	3.9	.3	.1	8.3
2025–26	(Turkey) Fenerbahçe	TBSL	0	0	.000	.000	.000	0	0	0	0	0

== National team career ==
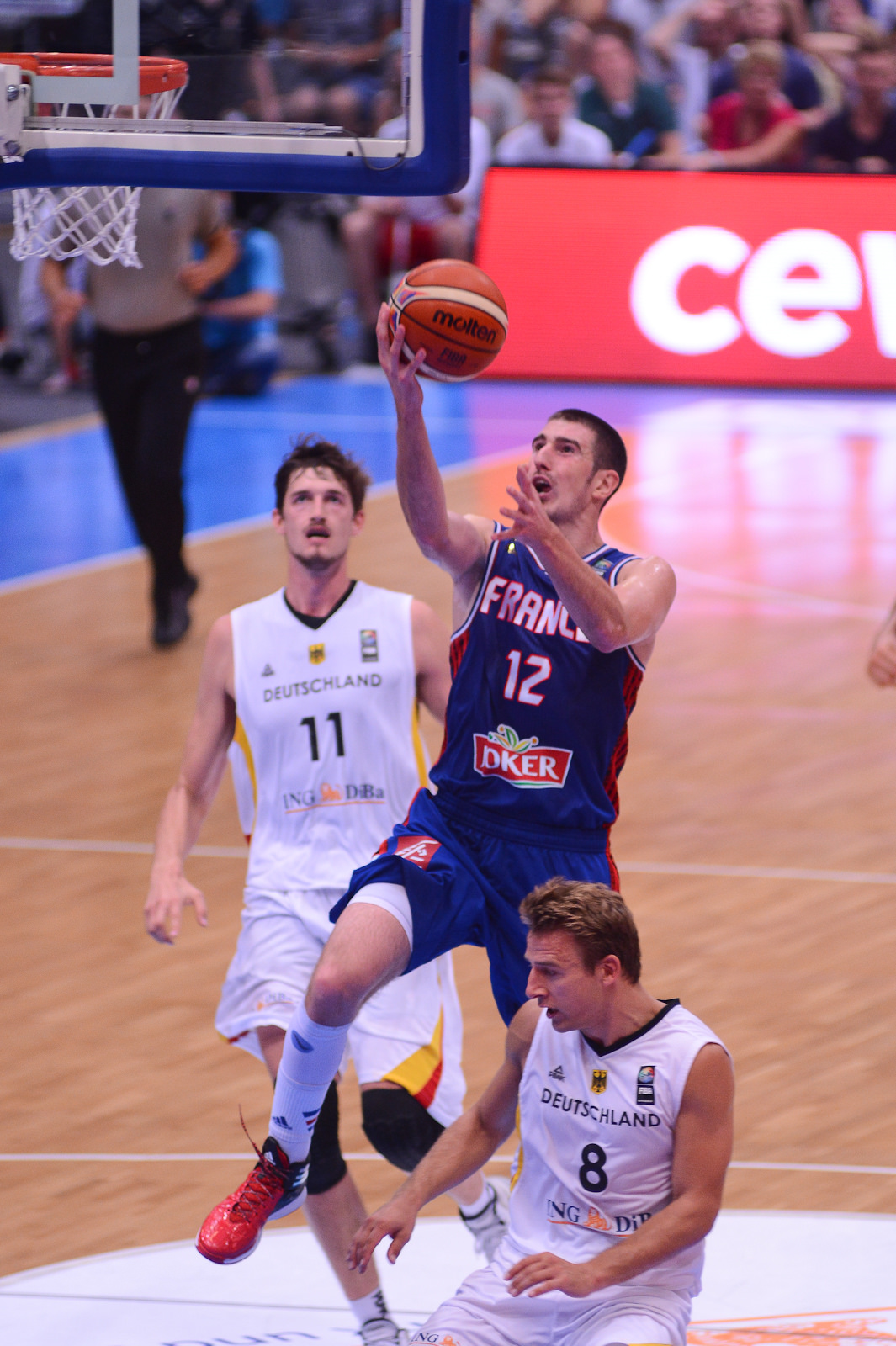
De Colo playing for France in 2015

De Colo is a regular member of the senior men's French national basketball team. He won a silver medal at the EuroBasket 2011 in Lithuania, a gold medal at the EuroBasket 2013 in Slovenia, and a bronze medal at the EuroBasket 2015 in France, where he also earned an All-Tournament Team selection.

De Colo played internationally at the 2012 London Olympics. He played a major role on the French team during the tournament. He also displayed strong offense and defense, as he scored seven points in their game against the United States.

He was the MVP of the 2016 Manila FIBA World Olympic Qualifying Tournament.

In September 2024, De Colo retired from the French National team after the 2024 Paris Olympics via social media.

=== International stats ===
- GP: Games played
- PPG: points per game
- RPG: rebounds per game
- APG: assists per game

Tournament	GP	PPG	RPG	APG
EuroBasket 2009	9	7.3	1.9	1.2
2010 FIBA World Championship	6	8.8	1.8	2.2
EuroBasket 2011	11	6.5	2.1	0.9
2012 Olympics	6	7.0	2.7	2.3
EuroBasket 2013	11	7.4	2.1	1.1
EuroBasket 2015	9	13.1	5.2	3.7
2016 Olympics Qualification	4	17.3	4.8	2.3
2016 Olympics	6	14.7	2.5	2.5
EuroBasket 2017	6	13.8	2.5	2.3
2019 FIBA Basketball World Cup	8	16.5	1.6	3.4
2020 Olympics	6	13.5	4.5	6.2
2023 FIBA Basketball World Cup	5	8.4	3.4	4.6
