= 2018–19 EuroLeague =

EuroLeague season

2018–19 Turkish Airlines EuroLeague^{1}
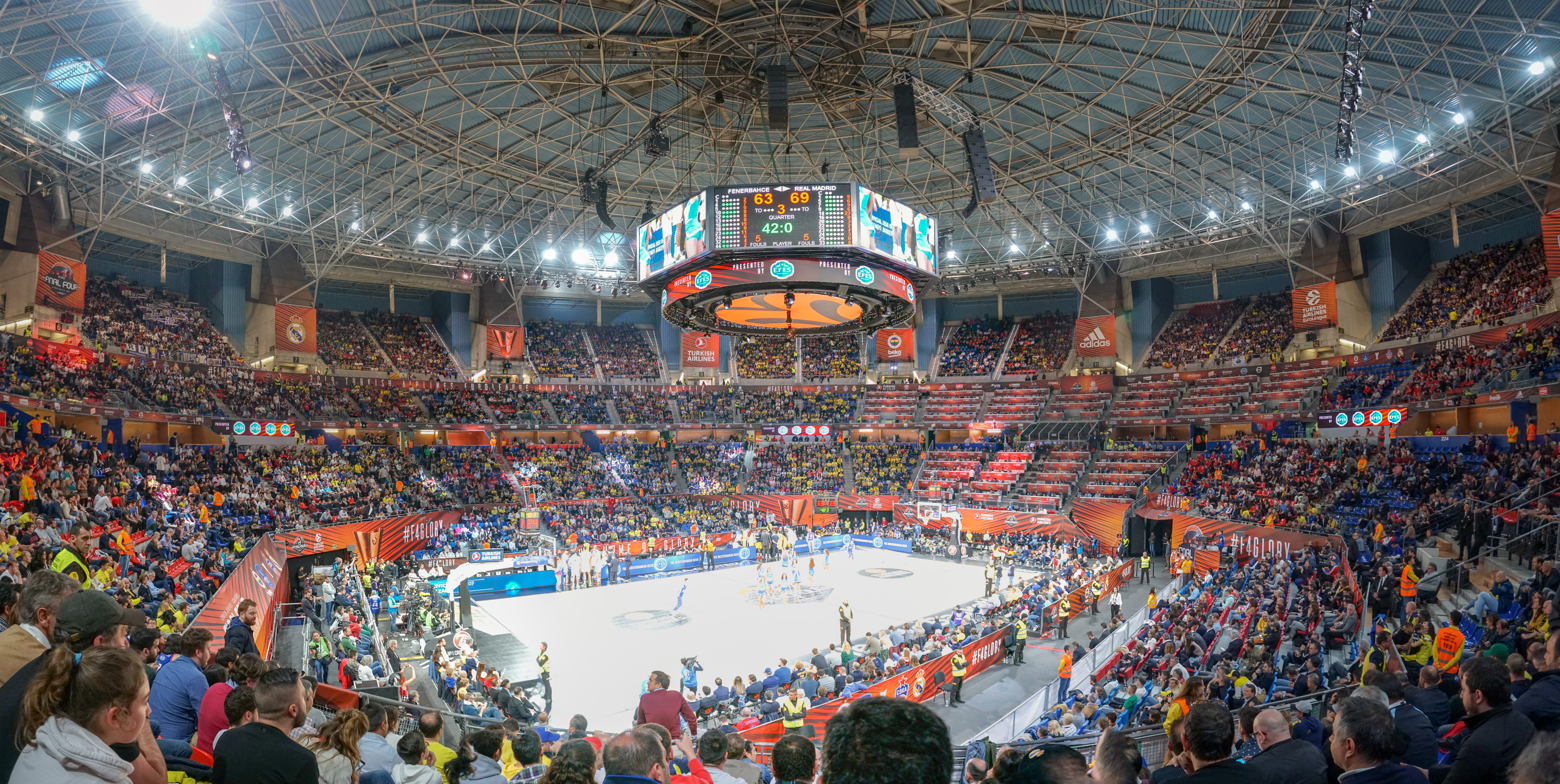
- The Fernando Buesa Arena in Vitoria-Gasteiz hosted the Final Four
- Season: 2018–19
- Dates: 11 October 2018 – 19 May 2019
- Games played: 260
- Teams: 16

Regular season
- Season MVP: (Czech Republic) Jan Veselý

Finals
- Champions: (Russia) CSKA Moscow (8th title)
- Runners-up: (Turkey) Anadolu Efes
- Third place: (Spain) Real Madrid
- Fourth place: (Turkey) Fenerbahçe Beko
- Final Four MVP: (United States) Will Clyburn

Awards
- Best Defender: (Cape Verde) Edy Tavares
- Rising Star: (Georgia (country)) Goga Bitadze
- Coach of the Year: (Greece) Dimitris Itoudis

Statistical leaders
| Points | (United States) Mike James | 19.8 |
| Rebounds | (France) Vincent Poirier | 8.3 |
| Assists | (Greece) Nick Calathes | 8.7 |
| Index Rating | (United States) Mike James | 20.2 |

Records
- Biggest home win: Bayern 116–70 Darüşşafaka (8 November 2018)
- Biggest away win: Olympiacos 75–99 Olimpia (19 October 2018)
- Highest scoring: Olimpia 111–94 Budućnost (3 January 2019)
- Winning streak: 12 games Fenerbahçe
- Losing streak: 12 games Darüşşafaka
- Highest attendance: 18,182; Panathinaikos 82–89 Real Madrid (23 April 2019)
- Lowest attendance: 1,011; Darüşşafaka 71–63 Budućnost (16 October 2018)
- ^{1} Sponsored league name, referring to Turkish Airlines.

The 2018–19 Turkish Airlines EuroLeague was the 19th season of the modern era of Euroleague Basketball and the eighth under the title sponsorship of the Turkish Airlines. Including the competition's previous incarnation as the FIBA Europe Champions Cup, this was the 62nd season of the premier competition for European men's clubs.

The season started on 11 October 2018 and finished in May 2019 with the 2019 EuroLeague Final Four at Fernando Buesa Arena in Vitoria-Gasteiz, Spain. CSKA Moscow won the championship after defeating Anadolu Efes in the championship game.

== Team allocation ==
A total of sixteen teams participated. The labels in the parentheses show how each team qualified for the place of its starting round (TH: EuroLeague title holders). Eleven teams were placed as Licensed Clubs, long-term licenses, while five spots were given to Associated Clubs, based on merit.

- LC: Qualified as a licensed club with a long-term licence
- 1st, 2nd, etc.: League position after Playoffs
- EC: EuroCup champion
- WC: Wild card

| Licensed Clubs | | Associated Clubs | |
|---|---|---|---|
| (Spain) Baskonia (LC) | (Turkey) Anadolu Efes (LC) | (Turkey) Darüşşafaka Tekfen (EC) | (Germany) Bayern Munich (1st) |
| (Spain) FC Barcelona Lassa (LC) | (Turkey) Fenerbahçe Beko (LC) | (Spain) Herbalife Gran Canaria (4th) | (Montenegro) Budućnost VOLI (1st) |
| (Spain) Real Madrid^{TH} (LC) | (Italy) AX Armani Exchange Milan (LC) | (Russia) Khimki (2nd) | |
| (Greece) Olympiacos (LC) | (Lithuania) Žalgiris (LC) | | |
| (Greece) Panathinaikos OPAP (LC) | (Russia) CSKA Moscow (LC) | | |
(Israel) Maccabi FOX Tel Aviv (LC)

Notes

1. ABA League (ABA): Montenegrin Budućnost VOLI qualified through the ABA League.
2. VTB United League (VTB): Russian Khimki qualified through the VTB United League.

== Teams ==
A total of 16 teams from 9 countries contest the league, including 11 sides with a long-term licence from the 2017–18 season, 1 team qualified from the EuroCup and the 4 highest-placed teams from the ABA League, the German Bundesliga, the VTB United League and the Spanish ACB.

Bayern Munich and Budućnost VOLI qualified, after clinching the Bundesliga and ABA League titles respectively. Khimki qualified as runner-up of the VTB United League. Herbalife Gran Canaria qualified as the highest-placed team in the Liga ACB without a long-term EuroLeague licence. Darüşşafaka qualified as the EuroCup champions, after beating Lokomotiv Kuban in the Finals.

=== Venues and locations ===
Location of teams in 2018–19 EuroLeague

| Team | Home city | Arena | Capacity |
|---|---|---|---|
| (Turkey) Anadolu Efes | Istanbul | Sinan Erdem Dome | 16,000 |
| (Italy) AX Armani Exchange Olimpia | Milan | Mediolanum Forum | 12,700 |
| (Spain) Barcelona Lassa | Barcelona | Palau Blaugrana | 7,585 |
| (Germany) Bayern Munich | Munich | Audi Dome | 6,500 |
| (Montenegro) Budućnost VOLI | Podgorica | Morača Sports Center | 5,500 |
| (Russia) CSKA Moscow | Moscow | Megasport Arena | 13,344 |
| (Turkey) Darüşşafaka Tekfen | Istanbul | Volkswagen Arena | 5,240 |
| (Turkey) Fenerbahçe Beko | Istanbul | Ülker Sports Arena | 13,059 |
| (Spain) Herbalife Gran Canaria | Las Palmas | Gran Canaria Arena | 11,500 |
| (Russia) Khimki | Khimki | Mytishchi Arena | 7,280 |
| (Spain) Kirolbet Baskonia | Vitoria-Gasteiz | Fernando Buesa Arena | 15,504 |
| (Israel) Maccabi FOX Tel Aviv | Tel Aviv | Menora Mivtachim Arena | 10,383 |
| (Greece) Olympiacos | Piraeus, Athens | Peace and Friendship Stadium | 12,000 |
| (Greece) Panathinaikos OPAP | Marousi, Athens | Olympic Sports Center Athens | 18,989 |
| (Spain) Real Madrid | Madrid | WiZink Center | 15,000 |
| (Lithuania) Žalgiris | Kaunas | Žalgirio Arena | 15,552 |

=== Personnel and sponsorship ===
| Team | Head coach | Captain | Kit manufacturer | Shirt sponsor |
|---|---|---|---|---|
| (Turkey) Anadolu Efes | (Turkey) Ergin Ataman | (Turkey) Doğuş Balbay | S by Sportive | Anadolu Efes |
| (Italy) AX Armani Exchange Olimpia | (Italy) Simone Pianigiani | (Italy) Andrea Cinciarini | Armani | Armani Exchange |
| (Spain) Barcelona Lassa | (Serbia) Svetislav Pešić | (Croatia) Ante Tomić | Nike | Lassa Tyres |
| (Germany) Bayern Munich | (Montenegro) Dejan Radonjić | (Germany) Danilo Barthel | Adidas | BayWa |
| (Montenegro) Budućnost VOLI | (Croatia) Jasmin Repeša | (Montenegro) Suad Šehović | Spalding | VOLI |
| (Russia) CSKA Moscow | (Greece) Dimitrios Itoudis | (United States) Kyle Hines | Nike | Rostelecom |
| (Turkey) Darüşşafaka Tekfen | (Turkey) Selçuk Ernak | (Turkey) Oğuz Savaş | Adidas | Tekfen |
| (Turkey) Fenerbahçe Beko | (Serbia) Željko Obradović | (Turkey) Melih Mahmutoğlu | Nike | Beko |
| (Spain) Herbalife Gran Canaria | (Spain) Pedro Martínez | (Dominican Republic) Eulis Báez | Spalding | Herbalife |
| (Russia) Khimki | (Lithuania) Rimas Kurtinaitis | (Russia) Sergei Monia | Adidas | Khimki Group |
| (Spain) Kirolbet Baskonia | (Croatia) Velimir Perasović | (Georgia (country)) Tornike Shengelia | Kelme | Kirolbet |
| (Israel) Maccabi FOX Tel Aviv | (Greece) Ioannis Sfairopoulos | (Israel) John DiBartolomeo | Nike | FOX |
| (Greece) Olympiacos | (Israel) David Blatt | (Greece) Vassilis Spanoulis | Nike | bwin |
| (Greece) Panathinaikos OPAP | (United States) Rick Pitino | (Greece) Nick Calathes | Adidas | Pame Stoixima |
| (Spain) Real Madrid | (Spain) Pablo Laso | (Spain) Felipe Reyes | Adidas | European University |
| (Lithuania) Žalgiris | (Lithuania) Šarūnas Jasikevičius | (Lithuania) Paulius Jankūnas | ŽalgirisShop | ORLEN Lietuva |

=== Managerial changes ===
| Team | Outgoing manager | Manner of departure | Date of vacancy | Position in table | Replaced with | Date of appointment |
|---|---|---|---|---|---|---|
| (Spain) Herbalife Gran Canaria | (Spain) Luis Casimiro | End of contract | 13 June 2018 | Pre-season | (Spain) Salva Maldonado | 26 June 2018 |
| (Turkey) Darüşşafaka | (Israel) David Blatt | End of contract | 31 May 2018 | Pre-season | (Turkey) Ahmet Çakı | 20 June 2018 |
| (Greece) Olympiacos | (Greece) Ioannis Sfairopoulos | Mutual consent | 18 June 2018 | Pre-season | (Israel) David Blatt | 27 June 2018 |
| (Spain) Kirolbet Baskonia | (Spain) Pedro Martinez | Sacked | 16 November 2018 | 11th (2–5) | (Croatia) Velimir Perasović | 16 November 2018 |
| (Israel) Maccabi FOX Tel Aviv | (Croatia) Neven Spahija | Sacked | 18 November 2018 | 14th (1–6) | (Greece) Ioannis Sfairopoulos | 18 November 2018 |
| (Spain) Herbalife Gran Canaria | (Spain) Salva Maldonado | Sacked | 5 December 2018 | 13th (3–7) | (Spain) Víctor García | 5 December 2018 |
| (Turkey) Darüşşafaka Tekfen | (Turkey) Ahmet Çakı | Sacked | 11 December 2018 | 16th (1–10) | (Turkey) Selçuk Ernak | 12 December 2018 |
| (Greece) Panathinaikos OPAP | (Spain) Xavi Pascual | Sacked | 20 December 2018 | 10th (6–7) | (United States) Rick Pitino | 26 December 2018 |
| (Montenegro) Budućnost VOLI | (Serbia) Aleksandar Džikić | Sacked | 29 December 2018 | 15th (3–12) | (Croatia) Jasmin Repeša | 30 December 2018 |
| (Russia) Khimki | (Greece) Georgios Bartzokas | Sacked | 21 January 2019 | 13th (7–12) | (Lithuania) Rimas Kurtinaitis | 21 January 2019 |
| (Spain) Herbalife Gran Canaria | (Spain) Víctor García | Sacked | 11 March 2019 | 14th (6–19) | (Spain) Pedro Martínez | 11 March 2019 |

== Regular season ==
In the regular season, teams played against each other home and away in a round-robin format. The top eight teams advanced to the playoffs and the bottom eight teams were eliminated.

=== League table ===
| Pos | Team | Pld | W | L | PF | PA | PD | Qualification |
|---|---|---|---|---|---|---|---|---|
| 1 | (Turkey) Fenerbahçe Beko | 30 | 25 | 5 | 2504 | 2237 | +267 | Advance to playoffs |
| 2 | (Russia) CSKA Moscow | 30 | 24 | 6 | 2590 | 2397 | +193 | Advance to playoffs |
| 3 | (Spain) Real Madrid | 30 | 22 | 8 | 2578 | 2342 | +236 | Advance to playoffs |
| 4 | (Turkey) Anadolu Efes | 30 | 20 | 10 | 2562 | 2406 | +156 | Advance to playoffs |
| 5 | (Spain) Barcelona Lassa | 30 | 18 | 12 | 2358 | 2282 | +76 | Advance to playoffs |
| 6 | (Greece) Panathinaikos OPAP | 30 | 16 | 14 | 2382 | 2345 | +37 | Advance to playoffs |
| 7 | (Spain) Kirolbet Baskonia | 30 | 15 | 15 | 2449 | 2378 | +71 | Advance to playoffs |
| 8 | (Lithuania) Žalgiris | 30 | 15 | 15 | 2360 | 2323 | +37 | Advance to playoffs |
| 9 | (Greece) Olympiacos | 30 | 15 | 15 | 2326 | 2301 | +25 | |
| 10 | (Israel) Maccabi Tel Aviv | 30 | 14 | 16 | 2376 | 2346 | +30 | |
| 11 | (Germany) Bayern Munich | 30 | 14 | 16 | 2348 | 2404 | −56 | |
| 12 | (Italy) AX Armani Exchange Olimpia | 30 | 14 | 16 | 2601 | 2600 | +1 | |
| 13 | (Russia) Khimki | 30 | 9 | 21 | 2333 | 2449 | −116 | |
| 14 | (Spain) Herbalife Gran Canaria | 30 | 8 | 22 | 2317 | 2616 | −299 | |
| 15 | (Montenegro) Budućnost VOLI | 30 | 6 | 24 | 2230 | 2550 | −320 | |
| 16 | (Turkey) Darüşşafaka Tekfen | 30 | 5 | 25 | 2238 | 2576 | −338 | |

Source: EuroLeague
Rules for classification: All points scored in extra period(s) will not be counted in the standings, nor for any tie-break situation.

=== Results ===
| Home \ Away | EFS | AXM | FCB | BAY | BUD | CSK | DTI | FNB | HGC | KHI | KBA | MTA | OLY | PAO | RMB | ZAL |
|---|---|---|---|---|---|---|---|---|---|---|---|---|---|---|---|---|
| Anadolu Efes | — | 101–95 | 92–70 | 92–77 | 106–68 | 78–80 | 82–68 | 89–83 | 93–74 | 81–72 | 96–85 | 90–77 | 75–65 | 78–62 | 82–84 | 79–93 |
| AX Armani Exchange Olimpia | 81–80 | — | 85–90 | 78–80 | 111–94 | 85–90 | 90–78 | 90–104 | 86–94 | 81–80 | 93–90 | 87–83 | 66–57 | 83–95 | 85–91 | 80–70 |
| Barcelona Lassa | 80–65 | 90–80 | — | 83–73 | 95–83 | 76–84 | 97–65 | 65–84 | 93–64 | 83–74 | 77–67 | 74–58 | 60–69 | 79–68 | 77–70 | 78–72 |
| Bayern Munich | 71–90 | 93–87 | 73–71 | — | 93–88 | 79–93 | 116–70 | 90–86 | 84–77 | 72–65 | 77–71 | 70–77 | 62–72 | 80–79 | 72–82 | 88–84 |
| Budućnost VOLI | 84–91 | 71–82 | 67–64 | 75–89 | — | 93–92 | 75–74 | 65–89 | 75–70 | 90–98 | 99–84 | 68–78 | 76–89 | 67–72 | 73–60 | 60–72 |
| CSKA Moscow | 102–84 | 101–95 | 95–75 | 77–70 | 99–69 | — | 79–75 | 70–68 | 107–85 | 88–74 | 82–78 | 76–93 | 69–65 | 77–78 | 82–78 | 99–97 |
| Darüşşafaka Tekfen | 88–93 | 92–98 | 71–79 | 92–87 | 71–63 | 65–80 | — | 75–97 | 71–75 | 91–85 | 80–75 | 71–73 | 79–75 | 67–91 | 82–86 | 71–75 |
| Fenerbahçe Beko | 84–66 | 92–85 | 88–82 | 88–84 | 76–67 | 79–75 | 100–79 | — | 97–72 | 93–85 | 96–87 | 78–75 | 90–75 | 85–66 | 65–63 | 78–61 |
| Herbalife Gran Canaria | 90–94 | 104–106 | 87–86 | 74–89 | 95–85 | 91–106 | 84–64 | 64–82 | — | 70–99 | 71–84 | 84–78 | 90–67 | 80–99 | 67–75 | 73–66 |
| Khimki | 84–85 | 88–90 | 80–87 | 60–71 | 85–69 | 72–80 | 85–84 | 84–78 | 87–72 | — | 77–85 | 71–76 | 66–87 | 76–68 | 75–100 | 74–64 |
| Kirolbet Baskonia | 92–102 | 80–75 | 70–77 | 76–68 | 82–62 | 76–73 | 82–56 | 72–74 | 83–66 | 104–86 | — | 97–73 | 80–85 | 86–77 | 86–76 | 80–73 |
| Maccabi FOX Tel Aviv | 71–79 | 94–92 | 99–83 | 95–71 | 81–76 | 86–89 | 77–58 | 70–74 | 90–55 | 79–63 | 79–81 | — | 65–64 | 84–75 | 66–87 | 83–85 |
| Olympiacos | 88–81 | 75–99 | 55–76 | 89–69 | 92–70 | 81–97 | 99–74 | 72–73 | 98–77 | 71–57 | 91–87 | 88–80 | — | 79–65 | 88–83 | 68–72 |
| Panathinaikos OPAP | 88–75 | 83–86 | 76–70 | 77–67 | 87–67 | 96–84 | 75–67 | 69–81 | 102–87 | 94–85 | 72–70 | 89–84 | 93–80 | — | 73–74 | 83–87 |
| Real Madrid | 92–84 | 92–89 | 92–65 | 91–78 | 89–55 | 88–93 | 109–93 | 101–86 | 89–76 | 79–74 | 97–79 | 91–79 | 94–78 | 89–68 | — | 86–93 |
| Žalgiris | 58–79 | 83–78 | 85–88 | 85–79 | 84–76 | 79–84 | 94–67 | 75–82 | 98–64 | 83–84 | 79–87 | 80–73 | 83–75 | 82–69 | 79–90 | — |

Source: EuroLeague
Legend: Blue = home team win; Red = away team win.
Matches with lighter background shading were decided after overtime.

== Playoffs ==
Playoffs series are best-of-five. The first team to win three games wins the series. A 2–2–1 format is used – teams with home-court advantage play games 1, 2, and 5 at home, while their opponents host games 3 and 4. Games 4 and 5 are only played if necessary. The four victorious teams advance to the Final Four.

=== Series ===
| Team 1 | Series | Team 2 | Game 1 | Game 2 | Game 3 | Game 4 | Game 5 |
|---|---|---|---|---|---|---|---|
| Fenerbahçe Beko (Turkey) | 3–1 | (Lithuania) Žalgiris | 76–43 | 80–82 | 66–57 | 99–82 | |
| CSKA Moscow (Russia) | 3–1 | (Spain) Kirolbet Baskonia | 94–68 | 68–78 | 84–77 | 92–83 | |
| Real Madrid (Spain) | 3–0 | (Greece) Panathinaikos OPAP | 75–72 | 78–63 | 89–82 | | |
| Anadolu Efes (Turkey) | 3–2 | (Spain) Barcelona Lassa | 75–68 | 72–74 | 102–68 | 72–82 | 80–71 |

== Final Four ==
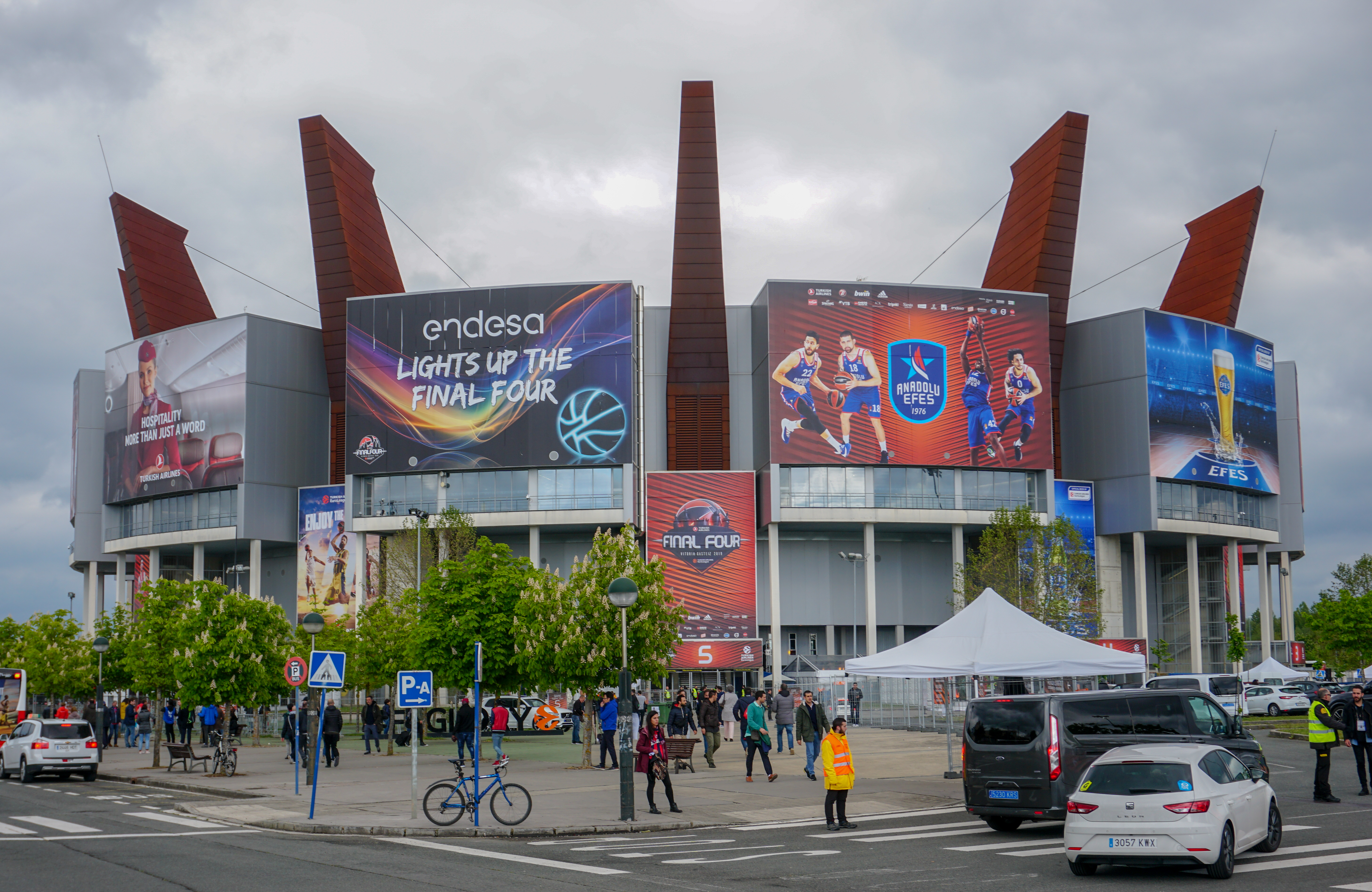
The Fernando Buesa Arena prior to the Final Four in May 2019

The Final Four, held over a single weekend, is the last phase of the season. The four remaining teams play a single knockout round on Friday evening, with the two winners advancing to the championship game. Sunday starts with the third-place game, followed by the championship game. The Final Four was played at the Fernando Buesa Arena in Vitoria-Gasteiz, Spain on 17 and 19 May 2019.

Semifinals
17 May
(Turkey) Fenerbahçe Beko | 73
(Turkey) Anadolu Efes | 92
17 May
(Russia) CSKA Moscow | 95
(Spain) Real Madrid | 90

Championship game
19 May
(Turkey) Anadolu Efes | 83
(Russia) CSKA Moscow | 91
Third place game
19 May
(Turkey) Fenerbahçe Beko | 75
(Spain) Real Madrid | 94

== Attendances ==
=== Average home attendances ===
| Pos | Team | Total | High | Low | Average | Change |
|---|---|---|---|---|---|---|
| | 2019 Final Four games | 52,955 | 13,470 | 12,866 | 13,239 | −16.9% |
| 1 | (Lithuania) Žalgiris | 251,742 | 15,517 | 13,569 | 14,808 | +9.2% |
| 2 | (Greece) Panathinaikos OPAP | 200,473 | 18,182 | 7,487 | 12,530 | −3.7% |
| 3 | (Spain) Kirolbet Baskonia | 189,352 | 12,847 | 9,743 | 11,138 | −1.9% |
| 4 | (Turkey) Fenerbahçe Beko | 182,529 | 12,821 | 7,380 | 10,737 | −7.2% |
| 5 | (Israel) Maccabi FOX Tel Aviv | 157,826 | 11,060 | 9,476 | 10,522 | −1.9% |
| 6 | (Spain) Real Madrid | 166,457 | 12,749 | 7,328 | 9,792 | −2.4% |
| 7 | (Italy) AX Armani Exchange Olimpia | 127,402 | 11,851 | 6,343 | 8,493 | +13.7%^{2} |
| 8 | (Turkey) Anadolu Efes | 148,452 | 15,249 | 3,153 | 8,247 | +111.5% |
| 9 | (Greece) Olympiacos | 123,042 | 11,107 | 4,136 | 8,203 | −8.0% |
| 10 | (Russia) CSKA Moscow | 122,369 | 12,341 | 4,473 | 7,198 | −12.3% |
| 11 | (Spain) Barcelona Lassa | 98,487 | 7,311 | 4,372 | 5,793 | +2.0% |
| 12 | (Russia) Khimki | 82,529 | 7,151 | 3,259 | 5,502 | −8.6% |
| 13 | (Spain) Herbalife Gran Canaria | 72,348 | 7,430 | 3,648 | 4,823 | +18.9%^{1} |
| 14 | (Montenegro) Budućnost VOLI | 71,877 | 5,260 | 4,081 | 4,792 | +67.2%^{1} |
| 15 | (Germany) Bayern Munich | 65,233 | 5,809 | 3,259 | 4,349 | −20.4%^{1} |
| 16 | (Turkey) Darüşşafaka Tekfen | 40,372 | 4,204 | 1,011 | 2,691 | +3.1%^{1} |
| | League total | 2,153,445 | 18,182 | 1,011 | 8,282 | −5.7% |

Source: EuroLeague
Notes:
1: 2017–18 season average applied to EuroCup games
2: AX Armani Exchange Olimpia played one match at PalaBancoDesio, instead of Mediolanum Forum.

=== Top 10 ===
| Pos. | Round | Game | Home team | Visitor | Attendance | Ref |
|---|---|---|---|---|---|---|
| 1 | Playoffs | 3 | (Greece) Panathinaikos OPAP | (Spain) Real Madrid | 18,182 | |
| 2 | Regular Season | 29 | (Greece) Panathinaikos OPAP | (Spain) Real Madrid | 18,003 | |
| 3 | Regular Season | 6 | (Greece) Panathinaikos OPAP | (Greece) Olympiacos | 17,345 | |
| 4 | Regular Season | 27 | (Greece) Panathinaikos OPAP | (Spain) Kirolbet Baskonia | 16,513 | |
| 5 | Regular Season | 15 | (Greece) Panathinaikos OPAP | (Russia) CSKA Moscow | 15,733 | |
| 6 | Playoffs | 3 | (Lithuania) Žalgiris | (Turkey) Fenerbahçe Beko | 15,517 | |
| 7 | Playoffs | 5 | (Turkey) Anadolu Efes | (Spain) Barcelona Lassa | 15,249 | |
| 8 | Regular Season | 16 | (Lithuania) Žalgiris | (Russia) CSKA Moscow | 15,205 | |
| 9 | Regular Season | 28 | (Lithuania) Žalgiris | (Turkey) Darüşşafaka Tekfen | 15,178 | |
| 10 | Playoffs | 4 | (Lithuania) Žalgiris | (Turkey) Fenerbahçe Beko | 15,177 | |

Panathinaikos game against Olympiacos was played with only 17,345 seats available for security reasons

== Awards ==
=== EuroLeague MVP ===
- (Czech Republic) Jan Veselý ( (Turkey) Fenerbahçe Beko)

=== EuroLeague Final Four MVP ===
- (United States) Will Clyburn ( (Russia) CSKA Moscow)

=== All-EuroLeague Teams ===
| Pos. | First Team | | Second Team | |
|---|---|---|---|---|
| G | (Greece) Nick Calathes | (Greece) Panathinaikos | (United States) Mike James | (Italy) Olimpia Milano |
| G | (Greece) Kostas Sloukas | (Turkey) Fenerbahçe | (France) Nando de Colo | (Russia) CSKA Moscow |
| F | (United States) Will Clyburn | (Russia) CSKA Moscow | (Serbia) Vasilije Micić | (Turkey) Anadolu Efes |
| F | (United States) Brandon Davies | (Lithuania) Žalgiris | (France) Vincent Poirier | (Spain) Kirolbet Baskonia |
| C | (Czech Republic) Jan Veselý | (Turkey) Fenerbahçe | (Cape Verde) Edy Tavares | (Spain) Real Madrid |

=== Alphonso Ford Top Scorer Trophy ===
- (United States) Mike James ( (Italy) AX Armani Exchange Olimpia Milan)

=== Best Defender ===
- (Cape Verde) Edy Tavares ( (Spain) Real Madrid)

=== Rising Star ===
- (Georgia (country)) Goga Bitadze ( (Montenegro) Budućnost VOLI)

=== Coach of the Year ===
- (Greece) Dimitrios Itoudis ( (Russia) CSKA Moscow)

=== MVP of the Round ===
Regular season

| Round | Player | Team | PIR | Ref. |
|---|---|---|---|---|
| 1 | (Czech Republic) Jan Veselý | (Turkey) Fenerbahçe Beko | 34 | |
| 2 | (Serbia) Nikola Milutinov | (Greece) Olympiacos | 33 | |
| 2 | (Slovenia) Anthony Randolph | (Spain) Real Madrid | 33 | |
| 3 | (Turkey) Scottie Wilbekin | (Israel) Maccabi FOX Tel Aviv | 30 | |
| 3 | (France) Rodrigue Beaubois | (Turkey) Anadolu Efes | 30 | |
| 4 | (France) Nando de Colo | (Russia) CSKA Moscow | 27 | |
| 5 | (Mexico) Gustavo Ayón | (Spain) Real Madrid | 30 | |
| 6 | (United States) Cory Higgins | (Russia) CSKA Moscow | 28 | |
| 7 | (Dominican Republic) Eulis Báez | (Spain) Herbalife Gran Canaria | 32 | |
| 8 | (Russia) Alexey Shved | (Russia) Khimki | 30 | |
| 9 | (Russia) Alexey Shved (2) | (Russia) Khimki | 32 | |
| 10 | (United States) Zach LeDay | (Greece) Olympiacos | 42 | |
| 11 | (Mexico) Gustavo Ayón (2) | (Spain) Real Madrid | 34 | |
| 12 | (United States) Derrick Williams | (Germany) Bayern Munich | 35 | |
| 13 | (Serbia) Nikola Milutinov (2) | (Greece) Olympiacos | 36 | |
| 14 | (Greece) Vassilis Spanoulis | (Greece) Olympiacos | 31 | |
| 15 | (United States) Johnny O'Bryant III | (Israel) Maccabi FOX Tel Aviv | 44 | |
| 16 | (Serbia) Nikola Milutinov (3) | (Greece) Olympiacos | 41 | |
| 17 | (Greece) Kostas Papanikolaou | (Greece) Olympiacos | 31 | |
| 18 | (Brazil) Marcelo Huertas | (Spain) Kirolbet Baskonia | 29 | |
| 19 | (United States) Will Clyburn | (Russia) CSKA Moscow | 27 | |
| 20 | (United States) Angelo Caloiaro | (Israel) Maccabi FOX Tel Aviv | 33 | |
| 21 | (France) Nando de Colo (2) | (Russia) CSKA Moscow | 38 | |
| 22 | (Croatia) Krunoslav Simon | (Turkey) Anadolu Efes | 34 | |
| 23 | (United States) Brandon Davies | (Lithuania) Žalgiris | 34 | |
| 24 | (Croatia) Ante Tomić | (Spain) Barcelona Lassa | 28 | |
| 25 | (United States) Shane Larkin | (Turkey) Anadolu Efes | 43 | |
| 26 | (United States) Mike James | (Italy) AX Armani Exchange Olimpia Milan | 31 | |
| 27 | (Nigeria) Micheal Eric | (Turkey) Darüşşafaka Tekfen | 33 | |
| 28 | (Greece) Nick Calathes | (Greece) Panathinaikos OPAP | 39 | |
| 29 | (United States) Toney Douglas | (Turkey) Darüşşafaka Tekfen | 37 | |
| 30 | (United States) Brandon Davies (2) | (Lithuania) Žalgiris | 34 | |

Playoffs

| Game | Player | Team | PIR | Ref. |
|---|---|---|---|---|
| 1 | (Serbia) Vasilije Micić | (Turkey) Anadolu Efes | 30 | |
| 2 | (France) Vincent Poirier | (Spain) Kirolbet Baskonia | 32 | |
| 3 | (United States) Shane Larkin (2) | (Turkey) Anadolu Efes | 34 | |
| 4 | (France) Nando de Colo (3) | (Russia) CSKA Moscow | 35 | |
| 5 | (United States) Shane Larkin (3) | (Turkey) Anadolu Efes | 19 | |

=== MVP of the Month ===
| Month | Week | Player | Team | Ref. |
2018
| October | 1–4 | (Cape Verde) Edy Tavares | (Spain) Real Madrid | |
| November | 5–10 | (Serbia) Vasilije Micić | (Turkey) Anadolu Efes | |
| December | 11–15 | (Czech Republic) Jan Veselý | (Turkey) Fenerbahçe Beko | |
2019
| January | 16–20 | (Israel) Alex Tyus | (Israel) Maccabi FOX Tel Aviv | |
| February | 21–24 | (United States) Mike James | (Italy) AX Armani Exchange Olimpia | |
| March | 25–29 | (Greece) Nick Calathes | (Greece) Panathinaikos OPAP | |
| April | 30–PO5 | (Argentina) Facundo Campazzo | (Spain) Real Madrid | |

== Statistics ==
=== Individual statistics ===
==== Rating ====
| Rank | Name | Team | Games | Rating | PIR |
|---|---|---|---|---|---|
| 1. | (United States) Mike James | (Italy) AX Armani Exchange Olimpia | 30 | 607 | 20.23 |
| 2. | (Serbia) Nikola Milutinov | (Greece) Olympiacos | 28 | 561 | 20.04 |
| 3. | (Lithuania) Artūras Gudaitis | (Italy) AX Armani Exchange Olimpia | 21 | 392 | 18.67 |

Source: EuroLeague

==== Points ====
| Rank | Name | Team | Games | Points | PPG |
|---|---|---|---|---|---|
| 1. | (United States) Mike James | (Italy) AX Armani Exchange Olimpia | 30 | 595 | 19.83 |
| 2. | (United States) Cory Higgins | (Russia) CSKA Moscow | 32 | 476 | 14.88 |
| 3. | (France) Nando de Colo | (Russia) CSKA Moscow | 34 | 501 | 14.74 |

Source: EuroLeague

==== Rebounds ====
| Rank | Name | Team | Games | Rebounds | RPG |
|---|---|---|---|---|---|
| 1. | (France) Vincent Poirier | (Spain) Kirolbet Baskonia | 34 | 282 | 8.29 |
| 2. | (Serbia) Nikola Milutinov | (Greece) Olympiacos | 28 | 221 | 7.89 |
| 3. | (Lithuania) Artūras Gudaitis | (Italy) AX Armani Exchange Olimpia | 21 | 150 | 7.14 |

Source: EuroLeague

==== Assists ====
| Rank | Name | Team | Games | Assists | APG |
|---|---|---|---|---|---|
| 1. | (Greece) Nick Calathes | (Greece) Panathinaikos OPAP | 33 | 286 | 8.67 |
| 2. | (United States) Mike James | (Italy) AX Armani Exchange Olimpia | 30 | 191 | 6.37 |
| 3. | (Serbia) Vasilije Micić | (Turkey) Anadolu Efes | 37 | 204 | 5.51 |

Source: EuroLeague

==== Other statistics ====
| Category | Player | Team | Games | Average |
|---|---|---|---|---|
| Steals | (Greece) Nick Calathes | (Greece) Panathinaikos OPAP | 33 | 1.73 |
| Blocks | (Cape Verde) Edy Tavares | (Spain) Real Madrid | 34 | 1.68 |
| Turnovers | (Greece) Nick Calathes | (Greece) Panathinaikos OPAP | 33 | 3.09 |
| Fouls drawn | (Georgia (country)) Tornike Shengelia | (Spain) Kirolbet Baskonia | 20 | 5.45 |
| Minutes | (United States) Mike James | (Italy) AX Armani Exchange Olimpia | 30 | 33:56 |
| FT % | (Azerbaijan) Jaycee Carroll | (Spain) Real Madrid | 31 | 96.00% |
| 2-Point % | (Cape Verde) Edy Tavares | (Spain) Real Madrid | 34 | 79.39% |
| 3-Point % | (Latvia) Dairis Bertāns | (Italy) AX Armani Exchange Olimpia | 22 | 53.62% |

=== Individual game highs ===
| Category | Player | Team | Statistic |
|---|---|---|---|
| Rating | (United States) Johnny O'Bryant III | (Israel) Maccabi FOX Tel Aviv | 44 |
| Points | (United States) Shane Larkin | (Turkey) Anadolu Efes | 37 |
| Rebounds | (Serbia) Nikola Milutinov | (Greece) Olympiacos | 18 |
| Assists | (Greece) Nick Calathes | (Greece) Panathinaikos OPAP | 18 |
| Steals | (Bulgaria) Dee Bost | (Russia) Khimki | 6 |
| Steals | (Russia) Nikita Kurbanov | (Russia) CSKA Moscow | 6 |
| Blocks | (United States) Tarik Black | (Israel) Maccabi FOX Tel Aviv | 5 |

=== Team statistics ===
| Category | Team | Average |
|---|---|---|
| Rating | (Spain) Real Madrid | 103.57 |
| Points | (Italy) AX Armani Exchange Olimpia | 87.27 |
| Points Allowed | (Turkey) Fenerbahçe Beko | 75.64 |
| Rebounds | (Spain) Real Madrid | 36.86 |
| Assists | (Spain) Real Madrid | 20.17 |
| Steals | (Russia) Khimki | 7.60 |
| Blocks | (Turkey) Darüşşafaka Tekfen | 3.53 |
| Turnovers | (Turkey) Darüşşafaka Tekfen | 13.93 |
| FT % | (Turkey) Anadolu Efes | 82.10% |
| 2-Point % | (Turkey) Fenerbahçe Beko | 58.33% |
| 3-Point % | (Turkey) Fenerbahçe Beko | 42.79% |

== See also ==
- 2018–19 EuroCup Basketball
- 2018–19 Basketball Champions League
- 2018–19 FIBA Europe Cup
