= Fernando Buesa Arena =

Indoor arena in Vitoria-Gasteiz, Spain

- Buesa Arena
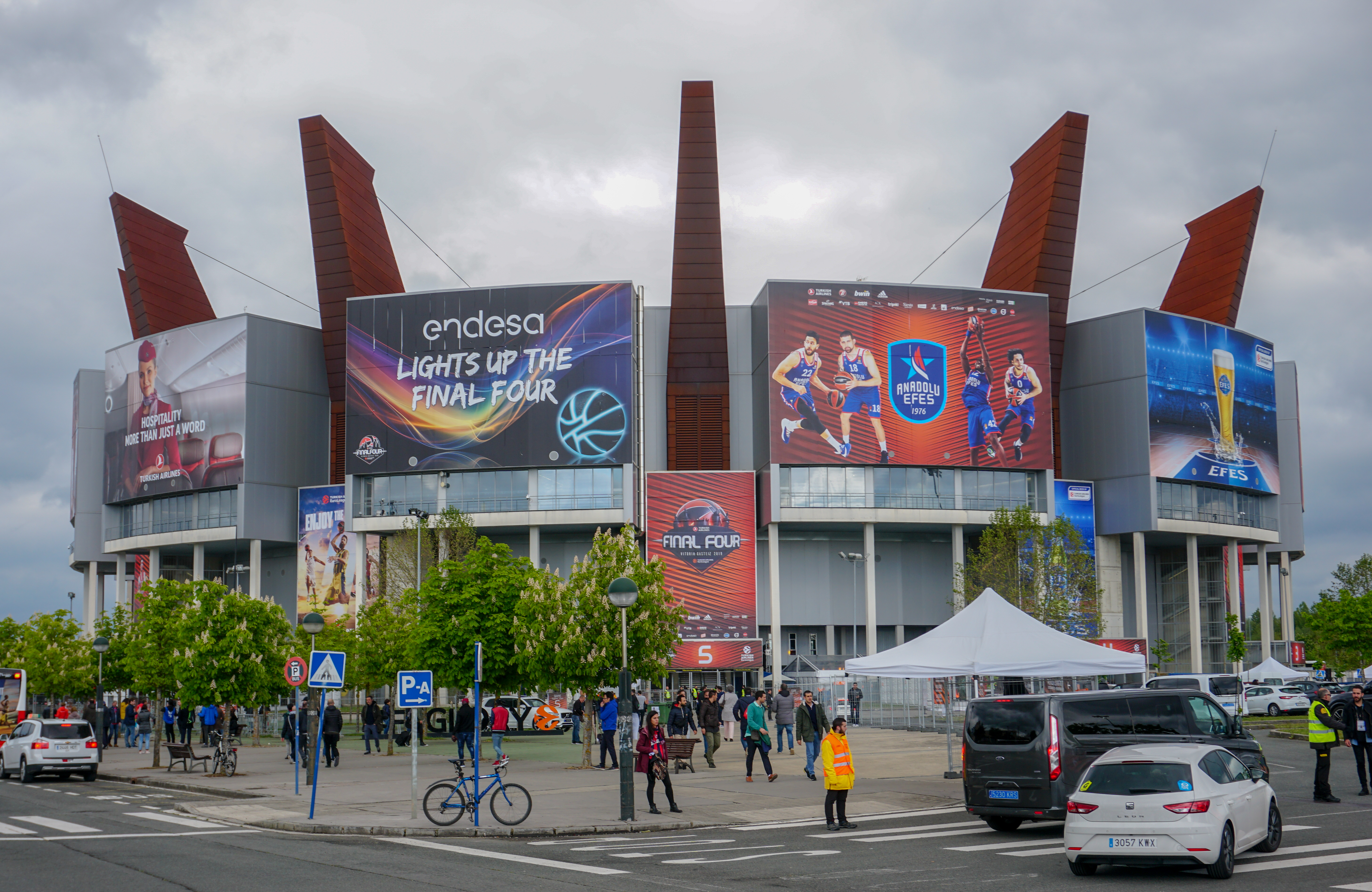
- Interactive map of Fernando Buesa Arena
- Former names: Pabellón Araba (1991–2000)
- Location: Torre 12 01013; Vitoria-Gasteiz, Araba, Spain
- Coordinates: 42°51′51.97″N 2°38′28.22″W
- Owner: Diputación Foral de Álava
- Capacity: Basketball: 15,716; Boxing / Martial arts: 16,164
- Record attendance: 15,544 (Baskonia vs Real Madrid, 3 January 2016)

Construction
- Opened: 1991
- Expanded: 2012

Tenant
- Saski Baskonia (1991–present)

Website
- Official Website

Fernando Buesa Arena is an indoor sports arena in Vitoria-Gasteiz, Spain. It is primarily used for basketball and is the home arena of Saski Baskonia.

== History ==
The history and evolution of this sports enclosure has been closely tied to its main user, the basketball team Saski Baskonia of the League ACB.

The arena's seating capacity, for basketball, is up to 15,504 people. Works to increase the arena's seating capacity from 9,923 to 15,504 people began in March 2011, and finished in April 2012.

Buesa Arena again beat the record of attendance against Real Madrid on 3 January 2016, with 15,544 spectators.

== Major events ==
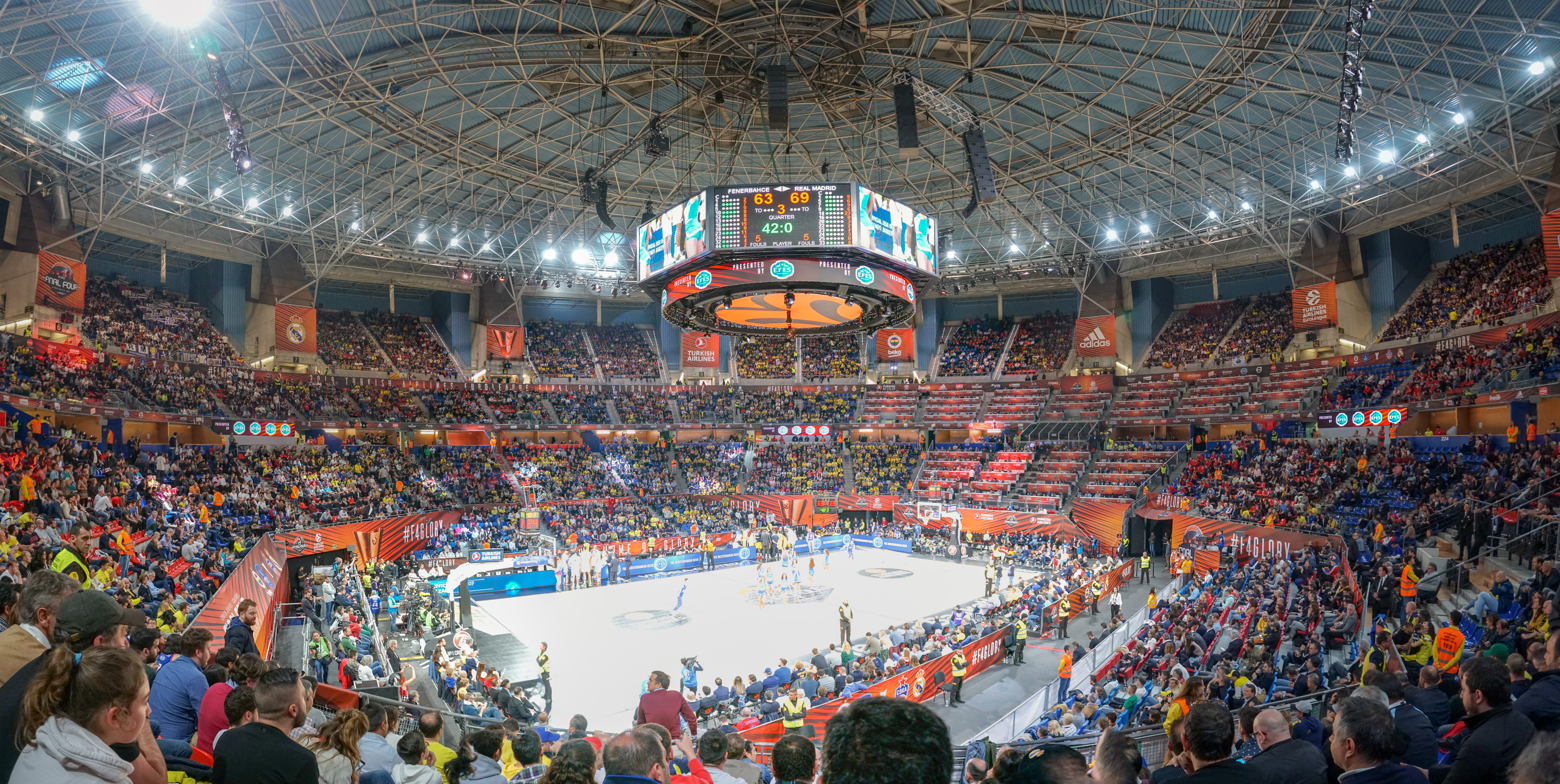
View of the arena during the 2019 EuroLeague Final Four

The arena hosted the 1996 European Cup Final, in which local Saski Baskonia won the title and also hosted the 2010 EuroCup Finals.

The Final Eight of the Copa del Rey (Spanish Cup) was played four times at Buesa Arena (2000, 2002, 2008 and 2013).

On 9 April 2012, at the game of Caja Laboral against Real Madrid, Fernando Buesa Arena registered the record of attendance in a basketball game of the Spanish Liga ACB with 15,504 spectators.

The arena has hosted the Euskalgym since 2014, which is one of the biggest and greatest rhythmic gymnastics gala events in the world.

On 3 January 2016, at the game of Laboral Kutxa against Real Madrid, Fernando Buesa Arena registered the new record of attendance in a basketball game of Liga ACB with 15,544 spectators.

It hosted the 2019 EuroLeague Final Four, registering an average attendance of 13,239 spectators in the four hosted games.

== Attendances ==
This is a list of league and EuroLeague games attendances of Baskonia at Fernando Buesa Arena since the last expansion was completed.

Liga ACB					EuroLeague				
Season	Total	High	Low	Average	Season	Total	High	Low	Average
2011–12 (Note: Only seven games played since the expansion was completed.)	94,038	15,504	10,512	13,434	2011–12	All games played at Iradier Arena			
2012–13	189,449	14,381	7,143	9,971	2012–13	168,416	15,068	9,936	12,030
2013–14	165,412	14,623	6,824	9,190	2013–14	128,106	14,196	8,246	10,676
2014–15	160,517	11,246	7,812	8,918	2014–15	117,882	12,619	7,689	9,824
2015–16	208,276	15,544	6,729	9,918	2015–16	153,265	13,964	8,366	10,948
2016–17	195,169	14,316	7,382	9,758	2016–17	186,133	14,875	9,437	11,633
2017–18	224,265	15,512	8,102	10,194	2017–18	192,959	14,923	9,196	11,351
2018–19	164,645	15,544	6,429	9,417	2018–19	189,352	12,847	9,743	11,138
2019–20 (Note: Season suspended due to the COVID-19 pandemic.)	107,170	11,589	7,625	8,931	2019–20	149,252	13,628	8,725	10,661
2020–21	Season played behind closed doors				2020–21	Season played behind closed doors			
2021–22 (Note: Some games played under limited attendance.)	128,691	10,038	5,062	6,773	2021–22	96,391	8,218	5,426	6,885
2022–23	157,929	15,501	5,706	8,774	2022–23	151,893	15,554	6,081	8,935
2023–24	153,803	15,504	6,242	9,047	2023–24	189,423	14,017	7,542	9,970

== See also ==
- List of indoor arenas in Spain
- List of basketball arenas

Preceded by Abdi İpekçi Arena; Istanbul	European Cup; Final Venue; 1996	Succeeded by Eleftheria Indoor Hall; Nicosia
Preceded by PalaVela; Turin	Eurocup; Final Venue; 2010	Succeeded by Palaverde; Treviso
