= 2010 Eurocup Basketball Finals =

The first-ever final four in the history of EuroCup Basketball, officially called the EuroCup Finals, was held at Fernando Buesa Arena, in Vitoria-Gasteiz, Spain. Euroleague Basketball Company did not initially commit to a third-place game, but ultimately decided to schedule that match up.

== Bracket ==
Semifinals
17 April
(Germany) ALBA Berlin	77
(Spain) Bilbao	70
17 April
(Spain) Power Electronics Valencia	92
(Greece) Panellinios	80

Final
18 April
(Germany) ALBA Berlin	44
(Spain) Power Electronics Valencia	67
Third-place playoff
18 April
(Spain) Bilbao	76
(Greece) Panellinios	67

== Semifinals ==
17 April 2010
18:00 CEST

Report

Power Elec Valencia (Spain)	92–80	(Greece) Panellinios
Scoring by quarter: 28-22, 25-17, 18-19, 21-22
Pts: de Colo 20; Rebs: Perović 7 Asts: Nielsen 6		Pts: Smith 29; Rebs: Smith 5 Asts: Blakney 7

Fernando Buesa Arena, Vitoria-Gasteiz
Attendance: 7,000
Referees: F. Rocha (POR), M. Boltauzer (SLO), E. Viator (FRA), T. Zancanella (ITA)

17 April 2010
20:45 CEST

Report

ALBA Berlin (Germany)	77–70	(Spain) Bilbao Basket
Scoring by quarter: 18-18, 17-12, 21-19, 21-21
Pts: Chubb 27; Rebs: Chubb 7 Asts: Hamann 5		Pts: Warren 14; Rebs: Warren 8 Asts: Blūms 3

Fernando Buesa Arena, Vitoria-Gasteiz
Attendance: 7,000
Referees: L. Lamonica (ITA), S. Dozai (CRO), M. Cmikiewicz (POL), C. Vauthier (FRA)

== Third-place playoff ==
18 April 2010
18:00 CEST

Report

Bilbao Basket (Spain)	76–67	(Greece) Panellinios
Scoring by quarter: 17-15, 18-24, 23-15, 18-13
Pts: Mumbrú 16; Rebs: Hervelle 10; Asts: Hervelle 4		Pts: Vougioukas 17; Rebs: Owens, Ostojić 5 Asts: Kalaitzis 3

Fernando Buesa Arena, Vitoria-Gasteiz
Attendance: 5,200
Referees: S. Dozai (CRO), E. Viator (FRA), R. Lottermoser (GER), M. Cmikiewicz (POL)

== Final ==
18 April 2010
20:45 CEST

Report

ALBA Berlin (Germany)	44–67	Power Elec Valencia (Spain)
Scoring by quarter: 10-11, 12-25, 11-12, 11-19
Pts: Byars, Hamann 9 Rebs: Golemac, Sekulić, McElroy 5 Asts: Wright 4		Pts: Perović 17; Rebs: Nielsen 6 Asts: Kelati 3

Fernando Buesa Arena, Vitoria-Gasteiz
Attendance: 6,500
Referees: L. Lamonica (ITA), F. Rocha (POR), M. Boltauzer (SLO), M. Cmikiewicz (POL)

Alba Berlin	Valencia
