= 2020–21 Saski Baskonia season =

Basketball season

TD Systems Baskonia
2020–21 season
- President: José Antonio Querejeta
- Head coach: Duško Ivanović
- Arena: Buesa Arena
- Liga ACB: 5th Seed
- Playoffs: Quarterfinals
- EuroLeague: Regular season
- Copa del Rey: Semifinalist
- Supercopa: Semifinalist
Home	Away	Third

The 2020–21 season is TD Systems Baskonia's 62nd in existence and the club's 39th consecutive season in the top flight of Spanish basketball and the 21st consecutive season in the EuroLeague. It is the second consecutive season under head coach Duško Ivanović.

Times up to 24 October 2020 and from 28 March 2021 are CEST (UTC+2). Times from 25 October 2020 to 27 March 2021 are CET (UTC+1).

== Overview ==
=== Pre-season ===
TD Systems Baskonia officially set its sights on the 2020–21 season as the club started its training camp for the coming campaign on August 11. Baskonia came into 2019–20 having played in the playoffs the previous four seasons, including the Final Four in 2015–16. But the team last season slumped to a 12–16 record and 13th place in the standings when the COVID-19 outbreak ended the campaign. Head coach Duško Ivanović joined the club in December 2019 and helped Baskonia take the 2020 Spanish League title. He guided Baskonia to the EuroLeague Finals in 2001 and to the EuroLeague Championship Game in 2005. Now, with new additions such as Rokas Giedraitis, Alec Peters and Tonye Jekiri, the club aims to return to the EuroLeague Playoffs, at least, in 2020–21.

== Players ==
=== Squad information ===
Note: Flags indicate national team eligibility at FIBA-sanctioned events. Players may hold other non-FIBA nationalities not displayed.

TD Systems Baskonia roster
Players
Coaches

Pos.	No.	Nat.	Name	Ht.	Age
PG	10	(Spain)	Colom, Quino	1.88 m (6 ft 2 in)	38 – 1 November 1988
C	12	(Spain)	Diop, Ilimane	2.10 m (6 ft 11 in)	31 – 4 April 1995
SG	30	(Slovenia)	Dragić, Zoran	1.96 m (6 ft 5 in)	37 – 22 June 1989
C	19	(Senegal)	Fall, Youssoupha	2.23 m (7 ft 4 in)	31 – 12 January 1995
SF	31	(Lithuania)	Giedraitis, Rokas	2.00 m (6 ft 7 in)	34 – 16 August 1992
C	5	(Nigeria)	Jekiri, Tonye	2.13 m (7 ft 0 in)	32 – 23 July 1994
SG	47	(Latvia)	Kurucs, Artūrs	1.89 m (6 ft 2 in)	26 – 19 January 2000
PG	4	(United States)	Massenat, Frantz	1.92 m (6 ft 4 in)	34 – 17 January 1992
PF	25	(United States)	Peters, Alec	2.06 m (6 ft 9 in)	31 – 13 April 1995
PF	33	(Italy)	Polonara, Achille	2.05 m (6 ft 9 in)	34 – 23 November 1991
SF	2	(Estonia)	Raieste, Sander	2.03 m (6 ft 8 in)	27 – 31 March 1999
SF	8	(Lithuania)	Sedekerskis, Tadas	2.00 m (6 ft 7 in)	28 – 17 January 1998

Head coach

- (Montenegro) Duško Ivanović

Legend

- (C) Team captain
- Injured

- Roster
Updated: May 16, 2021

=== Depth chart ===
Pos.	Starting 5	Bench 1	Bench 2
C	Ilimane Diop	Youssoupha Fall	Tonye Jekiri
PF	Achille Polonara	Alec Peters
SF	Tadas Sedekerskis	Zoran Dragić	Sander Raieste
SG	Rokas Giedraitis	Artūrs Kurucs
PG	Pierriá Henry	Frantz Massenat

Colours: Blue = homegrown player; Red = non–FIBA Europe player

=== Transactions ===
==== In ====
No.	Pos.	Nat.	Name	Age	Moving from		Type	Ends	Date	Source
31	SF	(Lithuania)	Rokas Giedraitis	27	ALBA Berlin	(Germany)	Transfer	June 2023	4 July 2020	
25	PF	(United States)	Alec Peters	25	Anadolu Efes	(Turkey)	End of contract	June 2022	10 July 2020	
5	C	(Nigeria)	Tonye Jekiri	25	LDLC ASVEL	(France)	End of contract	June 2022	11 July 2020	
0	SG	(Trinidad and Tobago)	Khadeen Carrington	24	MHP RIESEN Ludwigsburg	(Germany)	End of contract	June 2022	19 July 2020	

==== Out ====
No.	Pos.	Nat.	Name	Age	Moving to		Type	Date	Source
1	PF	(Bosnia and Herzegovina)	Ajdin Penava	23	Belfius Mons-Hainaut	(Belgium)	End of contract	7 July 2020	
10	PG	(Argentina)	Lautaro López	21	Inter Bratislava	(Slovakia)	End of contract	7 July 2020	
50	C	(Nigeria)	Micheal Eric	31	Türk Telekom	(Turkey)	End of contract	7 July 2020	
11	SG	(Georgia (country))	Matt Janning	32	Baxi Manresa	(Spain)	End of contract	7 July 2020	
23	PF	(Georgia (country))	Tornike Shengelia	28	CSKA Moscow	(Russia)	Transfer	9 July 2020	
31	SF	(Denmark)	Shavon Shields	26	AX Armani Exchange Milan	(Italy)	End of contract	9 July 2020	
17	PG	(Spain)	Sergi García	23	MoraBanc Andorra	(Spain)	End of contract	9 July 2020	
6	PG	(United States)	Semaj Christon	27	Tofaş	(Turkey)	End of contract	22 July 2020	
29	SF	(Argentina)	Patricio Garino	27	Žalgiris	(Lithuania)	End of contract	24 July 2020	
15	PG	(Uruguay)	Jayson Granger	30	ALBA Berlin	(Germany)	End of contract	1 August 2020	
5	SF	(Spain)	Miguel González	21	ZTE Real Canoe NC	(Spain)	Loan	1 August 2020	
0	SG	(Trinidad and Tobago)	Khadeen Carrington	24	Monaco	(France)	Contract release	11 September 2020	

== Pre-season and friendlies ==
=== Friendly match ===
28 August 2020	San Pablo Burgos	82–71	TD Systems Baskonia	Burgos
18:00	Scoring by quarter: 23–21, 25–15, 15–19, 19–16
	Pts: Rivero 14; Rebs: Rivero 6 Asts: Cook 8 PIR: Rivero 22	Boxscore	Pts: Giedraitis 20; Rebs: Jekiri 11; Asts: Carrington 3 PIR: Giedraitis 25	Arena: Coliseum Burgos; Attendance: 0 Referees: Juan Carlos García González, Sergio Manuel, Rubén Sánchez Mohedas

=== Euskal Kopa ===
30 August 2020	TD Systems Baskonia	87–77	RETAbet Bilbao Basket	Vitoria-Gasteiz
18:00	Scoring by quarter: 15–25, 24–17, 17–17, 31–18
	Pts: Polonara 23; Rebs: Polonara 7 Asts: Henry 7 PIR: Polonara 29	Boxscore	Pts: Balvín 18; Rebs: Kingsley 6 Asts: Brown 4 PIR: Balvín 24	Arena: Polideportivo Mendizorrotza; Attendance: 445; Referees: Juan Carlos García González, Sergio Manuel, Rubén Sánchez Mohedas

=== Friendly matches ===
2 September 2020	Movistar Estudiantes	78–82	TD Systems Baskonia	Madrid
18:00	Scoring by quarter: 20–28, 30–16, 14–13, 14–25
	Pts: Avramović 24; Rebs: Arteaga 8 Asts: Cvetković 9 PIR: Brown 24	Boxscore	Pts: Peters 22; Rebs: Peters 6 Asts: Vildoza 6 PIR: Peters 24	Arena: Antonio Magariños; Attendance: 0 Referees: Pérez, Aranzana, Garvin

3 September 2020	Real Madrid	88–73	TD Systems Baskonia	Madrid
17:00	Scoring by quarter: 16–25, 29–21, 21–6, 22–21
	Pts: Campazzo 14; Rebs: Randolph 7 Asts: Campazzo 7 PIR: three players 15	Boxscore	Pts: Henry 18; Rebs: Polonara 6 Asts: Henry 5 PIR: Henry 29	Arena: Ciudad Real Madrid; Attendance: 0

9 September 2020	TD Systems Baskonia	91–87	San Pablo Burgos	Vitoria-Gasteiz
18:00	Scoring by quarter: 21–15, 24–16, 26–21, 20–35
	Pts: Peters 22; Rebs: Jekiri 11; Asts: Vildoza 4 PIR: Peters 25	Boxscore	Pts: McFadden 20; Rebs: Kravić 6 Asts: Cook, Kravić 5 PIR: Kravić 19	Arena: Buesa Arena; Attendance: 0 Referees: Juan Carlos García González, Sergio Manuel, Rubén Sánchez Mohedas

15 September 2020	TD Systems Baskonia	125–61	Pau-Lacq-Orthez	Vitoria-Gasteiz
18:00	Scoring by quarter: 28–9, 25–7, 30–23, 42–22
	Pts: Giedraitis 31; Rebs: Giedraitis 7 Asts: Jekiri, Vildoza 6 PIR: Giedraitis 36	Boxscore	Pts: de Jong 18; Rebs: Cornelie 9 Asts: Evans 5 PIR: Cornelie 13	Arena: Buesa Arena; Attendance: 0 Referees: Rafael Serrano, Raúl Zamorano, Rubén Sánchez Monedas

== Competitions ==
=== Overview ===
Competition	First match	Last match	Starting round	Final position	Record							
Competition	First match	Last match	Starting round	Final position	Pld	W	D	L	PF	PA	PD	Win %
Liga ACB	20 September 2020	4 June 2021	Round 1	Quarterfinals	39	24	0	15	3,187	3,047	+140	61.54
EuroLeague	2 October 2020	8 April 2021	Round 1	10th	34	18	0	16	2,751	2,638	+113	52.94
Copa del Rey	12 February 2021	13 February 2021	Quarterfinals	Semifinalist	2	1	0	1	164	164	+0	50.00
Supercopa de España	12 September 2020		Semifinals	Semifinalist	1	0	0	1	68	72	−4	0.00
Total					76	43	0	33	6,170	5,921	+249	56.58

Source: Competitions

=== Liga ACB ===
==== League table ====
Pos	Team	Pld	W	L	PF	PA	PD	Qualification or relegation
3	Lenovo Tenerife	36	27	9	3147	2861	+286	Qualification to playoffs
4	Valencia Basket	36	24	12	3107	2917	+190	Qualification to playoffs
5	TD Systems Baskonia	36	23	13	2952	2814	+138	Qualification to playoffs
6	Hereda San Pablo Burgos	36	22	14	3130	2995	+135	Qualification to playoffs
7	Joventut	36	20	16	3089	3070	+19	Qualification to playoffs

Source: ACB
Rules for classification: 1) Win–loss record; 2) Head–to–head record; 3) Head–to–head point difference; 4) Point difference; 5) Points scored; 6) Sum of quotients of points scored (Note: Head–to–head record is used only after all the matches between the teams in question have been played)

==== Results summary ====
Overall						Home					Away				
Pld	W	L	PF	PA	PD	W	L	PF	PA	PD	W	L	PF	PA	PD
36	23	13	2952	2814	+138	12	6	1482	1386	+96	11	7	1470	1428	+42

Source: Competitive matches

==== Results by round ====
Round	1	2	3	4	5	6	7	8	9	10	11	12	13	14	15	16	17	18	19	20	21	22	23	24	25	26	27	28	29	30	31	32	33	34	35	36	37	38
Ground	H	A	A	H	A	H	A	H	A	H	H	R	H	A	H	A	A	H	A	H	A	H	A	H	A	H	A	H	A	A	H	H	R	H	A	H	A	A
Result	W	W	W	L	L	W	L	W	W	W	W	R	W	W	W	W	L	W	W	W	L	W	W	W	W	L	W	L	W	L	W	L	R	L	W	L	L	L
Position	9	4	4	5	7	5	7	4	4	4	4	5	4	4	4	4	4	4	4	4	4	4	3	3	3	3	3	4	4	4	4	4	5	5	5	5	5	5

Source: Competitive matches
A = Away; H = Home; W = Win; L = Loss; R = Rest

==== Matches ====
20 September 2020 1	TD Systems Baskonia	76–73	Valencia Basket	Vitoria-Gasteiz
18:30	Scoring by quarter: 25–16, 19–19, 14–20, 18–18
	Pts: Vildoza 21; Rebs: Giedraitis 7 Asts: Henry 7 PIR: Vildoza 17	Boxscore	Pts: Dubljević, Van Rossom 12; Rebs: Tobey 7 Asts: Prepelič 4 PIR: Van Rossom 21	Arena: Buesa Arena; Attendance: 0 Referees: Emilio Pérez, Juan de Dios Oyón, Joaquín García

24 September 2020 2	Urbas Fuenlabrada	73–89	TD Systems Baskonia	Fuenlabrada
21:45	Scoring by quarter: 13–23, 14–18, 32–27, 14–21
	Pts: Trimble 28; Rebs: Meindl, Vene 6 Asts: Trimble 6 PIR: Trimble 23	Boxscore	Pts: Giedraitis 17; Rebs: Jekiri 10; Asts: Vildoza 6 PIR: Giedraitis 20	Arena: Fernando Martín; Attendance: 0 Referees: Óscar Perea, Arnau Padrós, Vicente Martínez

26 September 2020 3	Movistar Estudiantes	84–86	TD Systems Baskonia	Madrid
20:45	Scoring by quarter: 19–16, 28–22, 11–19, 26–29
	Pts: Roberson 26; Rebs: Arteaga 6 Asts: Cvetković 5 PIR: Avramović, Roberson 19	Boxscore	Pts: Giedraitis 22; Rebs: Jekiri 8 Asts: Henry 9 PIR: Jekiri 28	Arena: WiZink Center; Attendance: 0 Referees: Rubén Sánchez, Fernando Calatrava, Carlos Cortés

4 October 2020 4	TD Systems Baskonia	75–83	UCAM Murcia	Vitoria-Gasteiz
17:00	Scoring by quarter: 15–21, 20–21, 18–17, 22–24
	Pts: Peters 15; Rebs: Peters 8 Asts: Henry 6 PIR: Peters, Polonara 18	Boxscore	Pts: DiLeo 22; Rebs: Lima 6 Asts: Davis 4 PIR: DiLeo 21	Arena: Buesa Arena; Attendance: 0 Referees: Cristóbal Sánchez, Jorge Martínez, Antonio Conde

11 October 2020 5	Hereda San Pablo Burgos	91–89	TD Systems Baskonia	Burgos
17:00	Scoring by quarter: 23–16, 25–22, 18–31, 25–20
	Pts: Kravić 16; Rebs: Rivero 8 Asts: Cook 7 PIR: Renfroe 23	Boxscore	Pts: Giedraitis 19; Rebs: Giedraitis 8 Asts: Diop, Vildoza 3 PIR: Diop 21	Arena: Coliseum Burgos; Attendance: 0 Referees: Carlos Merino, Juan de Dios Oyón, Miguel Ángel Pérez

18 October 2020 6	TD Systems Baskonia	82–71	Barça	Vitoria-Gasteiz
18:30	Scoring by quarter: 23–20, 16–20, 31–18, 12–13
	Pts: Giedraitis 19; Rebs: Jekiri 10; Asts: Vildoza 6 PIR: Polonara 26	Boxscore	Pts: Heurtel 15; Rebs: Davies 7 Asts: Calathes 6 PIR: Davies 25	Arena: Buesa Arena; Attendance: 0 Referees: Arnau Padrós, Alberto Sánchez, Juan Carlos García

24 October 2020 7	Joventut	83–82	TD Systems Baskonia	Badalona
20:45	Scoring by quarter: 26–19, 21–13, 15–21, 21–29
	Pts: Tomić 23; Rebs: López-Arostegui 11; Asts: Bassas 9 PIR: Bassas 28	Boxscore	Pts: Henry 24; Rebs: Fall 7 Asts: Vildoza 4 PIR: Henry 24	Arena: Palau Municipal d'Esports; Attendance: 0 Referees: Alberto Baena, Sergio Manuel, Juan Carlos García

28 October 2020 8	TD Systems Baskonia	87–68	Baxi Manresa	Vitoria-Gasteiz
18:30	Scoring by quarter: 21–16, 20–14, 20–26, 26–12
	Pts: Polonara 17; Rebs: Polonara 13; Asts: Henry 5 PIR: Polonara 31	Boxscore	Pts: Eatherton 15; Rebs: Vaulet 5 Asts: Pérez 4 PIR: Eatherton, Vaulet 14	Arena: Buesa Arena; Attendance: 0 Referees: Andrés Fernández, Vicente Bultó, Carlos Cortés

1 November 2020 9	Herbalife Gran Canaria	71–75	TD Systems Baskonia	Las Palmas
20:00	Scoring by quarter: 23–21, 12–13, 13–19, 23–22
	Pts: Albicy, Costello 19; Rebs: Wiley 8 Asts: Albicy 6 PIR: Costello 28	Boxscore	Pts: Dragić 17; Rebs: Polonara 9 Asts: Polonara, Vildoza 3 PIR: Dragić 19	Arena: Gran Canaria Arena; Attendance: 0 Referees: Jacobo Rial, Luis Miguel Castillo, Daniel Hierrezuelo

7 November 2020 10	TD Systems Baskonia	82–68	RETAbet Bilbao Basket	Vitoria-Gasteiz
20:45	Scoring by quarter: 25–18, 19–12, 22–18, 16–20
	Pts: Polonara, Vildoza 17; Rebs: Polonara 8 Asts: Vildoza 5 PIR: Polonara 27	Boxscore	Pts: Brown 19; Rebs: Balvín, Kulboka 7 Asts: Rousselle 7 PIR: Balvín, Rousselle 20	Arena: Buesa Arena; Attendance: 0 Referees: Antonio Conde, Rafael Serrano, Cristóbal Sánchez

15 November 2020 11	TD Systems Baskonia	80–74	Monbus Obradoiro	Vitoria-Gasteiz
12:30	Scoring by quarter: 17–15, 17–21, 28–19, 18–19
	Pts: Vildoza 19; Rebs: Peters 7 Asts: Vildoza 5 PIR: Vildoza 20	Boxscore	Pts: Cohen 17; Rebs: Cohen 10; Asts: Pozas 8 PIR: Cohen 23	Arena: Buesa Arena; Attendance: 0 Referees: Jordi Aliaga, Javier Torres, Roberto Lucas

2 December 2020 17	Real Madrid	92–83	TD Systems Baskonia	Madrid
21:15	Scoring by quarter: 25–19, 15–24, 28–15, 24–25
	Pts: Causeur 21; Rebs: three players 5 Asts: Laprovíttola 5 PIR: Causeur 27	Boxscore	Pts: Henry 21; Rebs: Polonara 8 Asts: Henry 6 PIR: Henry 20	Arena: WiZink Center; Attendance: 0 Referees: Carlos Peruga, Arnau Padrós, Cristóbal Sánchez

6 December 2020 13	TD Systems Baskonia	83–71	Acunsa GBC	Vitoria-Gasteiz
17:00	Scoring by quarter: 21–17, 17–19, 21–18, 24–17
	Pts: Henry 21; Rebs: Polonara 9 Asts: Henry 5 PIR: Henry 29	Boxscore	Pts: Radončić 17; Rebs: Tomàs 9 Asts: Špan 5 PIR: Radončić 17	Arena: Buesa Arena; Attendance: 0 Referees: Emilio Pérez, Luis Miguel Castillo, Yasmina Alcaraz

12 December 2020 14	Coosur Real Betis	73–77	TD Systems Baskonia	Seville
20:45	Scoring by quarter: 16–17, 19–16, 19–19, 19–25
	Pts: Campbell, Kay 12; Rebs: Enechionyia, Ouattara 8 Asts: Campbell 4 PIR: Kay 17	Boxscore	Pts: Henry 20; Rebs: Peters 7 Asts: Henry 6 PIR: Henry 25	Arena: San Pablo; Attendance: 0 Referees: Antonio Conde, Rafael Serrano, Fabio Fernández

20 December 2020 15	TD Systems Baskonia	79–72	Iberostar Tenerife	Vitoria-Gasteiz
16:00	Scoring by quarter: 18–20, 21–18, 23–18, 17–16
	Pts: Dragić, Giedraitis 15; Rebs: Fall, Sedekerskis 7 Asts: Vildoza 9 PIR: Sedekerskis 17	Boxscore	Pts: Yusta 13; Rebs: Shermadini 8 Asts: Salin 6 PIR: Yusta 13	Arena: Buesa Arena; Attendance: 0 Referees: Óscar Perea, Juan de Dios Oyón, Jacobo Rial

27 December 2020 16	Casademont Zaragoza	89–92	TD Systems Baskonia	Zaragoza
16:30	Scoring by quarter: 22–29, 22–22, 24–22, 21–19
	Pts: Barreiro 20; Rebs: Benzing 7 Asts: Barreiro, Ennis 5 PIR: Barreiro 23	Boxscore	Pts: Giedraitis 27; Rebs: Fall 11; Asts: Henry 9 PIR: Giedraitis 29	Arena: Pabellón Príncipe Felipe; Attendance: 0 Referees: Jordi Aliaga, Raúl Zamorano, Alfonso Olivares

2 January 2021 18	TD Systems Baskonia	84–67	MoraBanc Andorra	Vitoria-Gasteiz
18:30	Scoring by quarter: 18–23, 24–14, 19–16, 23–14
	Pts: Fall 17; Rebs: Fall 14; Asts: Henry 8 PIR: Fall 38	Boxscore	Pts: Senglin 20; Rebs: Paulí 5 Asts: Pálsson 5 PIR: Senglin 23	Arena: Buesa Arena; Attendance: 0 Referees: Fernando Calatrava, Martín Caballero, Andrés Fernández

10 January 2021 19	Unicaja	79–91	TD Systems Baskonia	Málaga
22:00	Scoring by quarter: 30–19, 15–21, 16–29, 18–22
	Pts: Waczyński 17; Rebs: Abromaitis 6 Asts: Fernández 10; PIR: Waczyński 19	Boxscore	Pts: Peters 21; Rebs: Jekiri, Polonara 7 Asts: Henry 7 PIR: Peters, Polonara 22	Arena: Martín Carpena; Attendance: 0 Referees: Antonio Conde, Martín Caballero, Joaquín García

17 January 2021 20	TD Systems Baskonia	103–76	Coosur Real Betis	Vitoria-Gasteiz
12:30	Scoring by quarter: 25–13, 27–23, 24–19, 27–21
	Pts: Peters 27; Rebs: Fall, Polonara 5 Asts: Henry 6 PIR: Peters 30	Boxscore	Pts: Ouattara 22; Rebs: Kay 10; Asts: Feldeine, Kay 3 PIR: Ouattara 21	Arena: Buesa Arena; Attendance: 0 Referees: Miguel Ángel Pérez, Luis Miguel Castillo, Carlos Merino

24 January 2021 21	Valencia Basket	83–61	TD Systems Baskonia	Valencia
18:30	Scoring by quarter: 14–18, 21–13, 23–12, 25–18
	Pts: Kalinić 14; Rebs: Tobey 10; Asts: Prepelič 5 PIR: Kalinić, Tobey 18	Boxscore	Pts: Dragić 12; Rebs: Sedekerskis 6 Asts: Vildoza 7 PIR: Polonara 14	Arena: La Fonteta; Attendance: 0 Referees: Juan Carlos García, Jorge Martínez, Vicente Martínez

31 January 2021 22	TD Systems Baskonia	89–61	Casademont Zaragoza	Vitoria-Gasteiz
17:00	Scoring by quarter: 24–13, 15–18, 21–19, 29–11
	Pts: Dragić 17; Rebs: Sedekerskis 7 Asts: Henry 7 PIR: Sedekerskis 21	Boxscore	Pts: Harris 18; Rebs: Harris 8 Asts: Ennis 3 PIR: Harris 23	Arena: Buesa Arena; Attendance: 0 Referees: Carlos Cortés, Martín Caballero, Fabio Fernández

7 February 2021 23	Iberostar Tenerife	79–81	TD Systems Baskonia	San Cristóbal de La Laguna
20:00	Scoring by quarter: 22–18, 20–20, 19–22, 18–21
	Pts: Shermadini 17; Rebs: Cavanaugh 6 Asts: Huertas 8 PIR: Shermadini 17	Boxscore	Pts: Polonara 19; Rebs: Jekiri, Polonara 7 Asts: Jekiri 5 PIR: Polonara 24	Arena: Santiago Martín; Attendance: 0 Referees: Fernando Calatrava, Vicente Bultó, Joaquín García

28 February 2021 24	TD Systems Baskonia	90–74	Urbas Fuenlabrada	Vitoria-Gasteiz
20:00
	Pts: Polonara 15; Rebs: Polonara 10; Asts: Henry 10; PIR: Polonara 27	Boxscore	Pts: Trimble 20; Rebs: Emegano, Meindl 5 Asts: Meindl 3 PIR: Trimble 20	Arena: Buesa Arena; Attendance: 0 Referees: Antonio Conde, Javier Torres, Esperanza Mendoza

7 March 2021 25	Monbus Obradoiro	78–87	TD Systems Baskonia	Santiago de Compostela
19:00
	Pts: Muñoz; Rebs: Daum 7 Asts: Beliauskas 4 PIR: Beliauskas 17	Boxscore	Pts: Vildoza 23; Rebs: Sedekerskis 9 Asts: Henry 8 PIR: Vildoza 27	Arena: Multiusos Fontes do Sar; Attendance: 0 Referees: Daniel Hierrezuelo, Francisco Araña, Alberto Baena

14 March 2021 26	TD Systems Baskonia	74–85	Real Madrid	Vitoria-Gasteiz
18:30	Scoring by quarter: 20–27, 16–18, 24–21, 14–19
	Pts: Henry 14; Rebs: Giedraitis, Peters 4 Asts: Henry 11; PIR: Henry 20	Boxscore	Pts: Deck 18; Rebs: Tavares 12; Asts: Deck, Thompkins 4 PIR: Deck 22	Arena: Buesa Arena; Attendance: 0 Referees: Emilio Pérez, Vicente Bultó, Alfonso Olivares

21 March 2021 27	RETAbet Bilbao Basket	72–85	TD Systems Baskonia	Bilbao
20:00	Scoring by quarter: 19–20, 16–25, 20–24, 17–16
	Pts: Rousselle 18; Rebs: Balvín 14; Asts: Håkanson, Jenkins 3 PIR: Balvín 20	Boxscore	Pts: Dragić 25; Rebs: Polonara 5 Asts: Henry 5 PIR: Dragić 26	Arena: Bilbao Arena; Attendance: 0 Referees: Fernando Calatrava, Alberto Sánchez, Jacobo Rial

28 March 2021 28	TD Systems Baskonia	78–99	Herbalife Gran Canaria	Vitoria-Gasteiz
17:00	Scoring by quarter: 18–24, 18–23, 20–28, 22–24
	Pts: Henry 18; Rebs: Sedekerskis; Asts: Henry 4 PIR: Henry 22	Boxscore	Pts: Albicy 24; Rebs: Costello 8 Asts: Albicy 6 PIR: Albicy 28	Arena: Buesa Arena; Attendance: 0 Referees: Daniel Hierrezuelo, Francisco Araña, Iyán González

4 April 2021 29	MoraBanc Andorra	68–82	TD Systems Baskonia	Andorra la Vella
12:30	Scoring by quarter: 23–21, 11–15, 18–27, 16–19
	Pts: Senglin 18; Rebs: Olumuyiwa 7 Asts: Hannah 9 PIR: Sy 15	Boxscore	Pts: Giedraitis 15; Rebs: three players 6 Asts: Vildoza 6 PIR: Giedraitis 23	Arena: M.I. Govern Andorra; Attendance: 0 Referees: Carlos Peruga, Raúl Zamorano, Alberto Baena

11 April 2021 30	UCAM Murcia	92–87	TD Systems Baskonia	Murcia
12:30
	Pts: Davis 29; Rebs: Lima, Webb 9 Asts: Taylor 9 PIR: Lima 22	Boxscore	Pts: Giedraitis 18; Rebs: Henry, Sedekerskis 5 Asts: Polonara 4 PIR: Sedekerskis 18	Arena: Palacio de Deportes; Referees: Juan Carlos García, Javier Torres, Esperanza Mendoza

15 April 2021 31	TD Systems Baskonia	96–92	Movistar Estudiantes	Vitoria-Gasteiz
18:30	Scoring by quarter: 23–24, 32–20, 17–25, 24–23
	Pts: Giedraitis 34; Rebs: Sedekerskis 8 Asts: Henry 10; PIR: Giedraitis 38	Boxscore	Pts: Vicedo 17; Rebs: Delgado 15; Asts: Roberson 10; PIR: Vicedo 23	Arena: Buesa Arena; Attendance: 0 Referees: Jordi Aliaga, Jorge Martínez, David Sánchez

18 April 2021 32	TD Systems Baskonia	83–94	Hereda San Pablo Burgos	Vitoria-Gasteiz
17:00	Scoring by quarter: 25–18, 21–24, 12–32, 25–20
	Pts: Giedraitis 19; Rebs: Polonara 10; Asts: Henry 9 PIR: Peters 29	Boxscore	Pts: Kravić 20; Rebs: Rivero 7 Asts: Cook 10; PIR: Renfroe 22	Arena: Buesa Arena; Attendance: 0 Referees: Óscar Perea, Juan de Dios Oyón, Fabio Fernández

11 May 2021 36	TD Systems Baskonia	71–79	Joventut	Vitoria-Gasteiz
18:30	Scoring by quarter: 16–15, 16–25, 19–19, 20–20
	Pts: Polonara 22; Rebs: Sedekerskis 8 Asts: Sedekerskis 3 PIR: Polonara 26	Boxscore	Pts: Ribas 17; Rebs: Tomić 6 Asts: Bassas 6 PIR: Brodziansky 21	Arena: Buesa Arena; Attendance: 0 Referees: Daniel Hierrezuelo, Jorge Martínez, Iyán González

13 May 2021 35	Acunsa GBC	63–81	TD Systems Baskonia	San Sebastián
20:30	Scoring by quarter: 9–29, 23–9, 9–14, 22–29
	Pts: Okouo 14; Rebs: Okouo 13; Asts: Špan 3 PIR: Radončić 19	Boxscore	Pts: Polonara 23; Rebs: Sedekerskis 10; Asts: Polonara 5 PIR: Polonara 25	Arena: Donostia Arena; Attendance: 0 Referees: Miguel Ángel Pérez, Sergio Manuel, Roberto Lucas

16 May 2021 34	TD Systems Baskonia	70–79	Unicaja	Vitoria-Gasteiz
12:30	Scoring by quarter: 13–12, 17–18, 18–27, 22–22
	Pts: Dragić 13; Rebs: Sedekerskis 7 Asts: Giedraitis, Henry 4 PIR: Giedraitis, Henry 14	Boxscore	Pts: Fernández 17; Rebs: Abromaitis, Thompson 6 Asts: Fernández 3 PIR: Abromaitis 20	Arena: Buesa Arena; Attendance: 0 Referees: Carlos Peruga, Rafael Serrano, Cristóbal Sánchez

19 May 2021 37	Barça	87–74	TD Systems Baskonia	Barcelona
21:15	Scoring by quarter: 21–21, 20–18, 24–19, 22–16
	Pts: Bolmaro 18; Rebs: Bolmaro, Davies 5 Asts: Bolmaro, Higgins 4 PIR: Bolmaro 17	Boxscore	Pts: Giedraitis 14; Rebs: Jekiri 10; Asts: Colom, Massenat 3 PIR: Sedekerskis 16	Arena: Palau Blaugrana; Attendance: 0 Referees: Óscar Perea, Luis Miguel Castillo, Vicente Martínez

23 May 2021 38	Baxi Manresa	71–68	TD Systems Baskonia	Manresa
12:30	Scoring by quarter: 18–19, 24–15, 15–13, 14–21
	Pts: Martínez 13; Rebs: Martínez 8 Asts: Hinrichs, Martínez 5 PIR: Martínez 16	Boxscore	Pts: Henry 18; Rebs: Jekiri 11; Asts: Henry 5 PIR: Jekiri 30	Arena: Nou Congost; Attendance: 0 Referees: Fernando Calatrava, Alberto Sánchez, Rubén Sánchez

==== ACB Playoffs ====
Win Loss

===== Quarterfinals =====
31 May 2021 1	Valencia Basket	87–86	TD Systems Baskonia	Valencia
19:45	Scoring by quarter: 22–18, 13–26, 25–19, 27–23
	Pts: Dubljević 20; Rebs: Kalinić 7 Asts: Van Rossom 7 PIR: Kalinić 24	Boxscore	Pts: Peters 16; Rebs: Polonara 7 Asts: Colom, Henry 3 PIR: Henry 18	Arena: La Fonteta; Attendance: 0 Referees: Daniel Hierrezuelo, Juan de Dios Oyón, Joaquín García

2 June 2021 2	TD Systems Baskonia	76–65	Valencia Basket	Vitoria-Gasteiz
19:45	Scoring by quarter: 26–16, 15–12, 21–18, 14–19
	Pts: Giedraitis 15; Rebs: Giedraitis 7 Asts: Henry 10; PIR: Giedraitis 24	Boxscore	Pts: Prepelič 20; Rebs: Dubljević 9 Asts: Van Rossom 3 PIR: Prepelič 15	Arena: Buesa Arena; Attendance: 0 Referees: Emilio Pérez, Arnau Padrós, Javier Torres

4 June 2021 3	Valencia Basket	78–73	TD Systems Baskonia	Valencia
19:45	Scoring by quarter: 23–19, 20–15, 16–19, 19–20
	Pts: Kalinić 18; Rebs: Kalinić 7 Asts: Van Rossom 6 PIR: Kalinić 29	Boxscore	Pts: Dragić 16; Rebs: Jekiri 6 Asts: Henry 8 PIR: Polonara 20	Arena: La Fonteta; Attendance: 0 Referees: Miguel Ángel Pérez, Carlos Peruga, Alberto Sánchez

=== EuroLeague ===
==== League table ====
Pos	Team	Pld	W	L	PF	PA	PD	Qualification
8	(Russia) Zenit Saint Petersburg	34	20	14	2670	2547	+123	Qualification to playoffs
9	(Spain) Valencia Basket	34	19	15	2762	2743	+19	
10	(Spain) TD Systems Baskonia	34	18	16	2742	2619	+123	
11	(Lithuania) Žalgiris	34	17	17	2630	2645	−15	
12	(Greece) Olympiacos	34	16	18	2628	2674	−46	

Source: EuroLeague
Rules for classification: All points scored in extra period(s) will not be counted in the standings, nor for any tie-break situation.

==== Results summary ====
Overall						Home					Away				
Pld	W	L	PF	PA	PD	W	L	PF	PA	PD	W	L	PF	PA	PD
34	18	16	2751	2638	+113	11	6	1389	1266	+123	7	10	1362	1372	−10

Last updated: complete.
Source: Competitive matches

==== Results by round ====
Round	1	2	3	4	5	6	7	8	9	10	11	12	13	14	15	16	17	18	19	20	21	22	23	24	25	26	27	28	29	30	31	32	33	34
Ground	H	A	H	H	A	H	H	A	H	H	A	A	H	A	A	A	H	H	A	A	H	A	H	A	A	H	H	A	H	A	H	A	H	A
Result	W	L	L	W	L	L	L	L	W	W	W	W	L	L	L	W	W	W	L	L	L	L	W	W	W	W	W	L	W	W	W	W	L	L
Position	2	11	10	7	8	10	13	14	13	11	10	9	10	11	11	10	9	10	12	13	13	13	13	11	11	11	10	10	9	9	9	7	9	10

Source: Competitive matches
A = Away; H = Home; W = Win; L = Loss

==== Matches ====
2 October 2020 1	TD Systems Baskonia (Spain)	76–63	(Spain) Real Madrid	Vitoria-Gasteiz
21:00	Scoring by quarter: 15–16, 18–13, 19–20, 24–14
	Pts: Henry 23; Rebs: Polonara 9 Asts: Henry 6 PIR: Henry 32	Boxscore	Pts: Campazzo 17; Rebs: Tavares 7 Asts: Campazzo 2 PIR: Tavares 17	Arena: Buesa Arena; Attendance: 400; Referees: Sreten Radović, Joseph Bissang, Mario Majkić

9 October 2020 2	Crvena zvezda mts (Serbia)	90–73	(Spain) TD Systems Baskonia	Belgrade
19:00	Scoring by quarter: 23–16, 13–15, 29–18, 25–24
	Pts: Loyd 30; Rebs: Kuzmić 8 Asts: Hall 11; PIR: Loyd 34	Boxscore	Pts: Giedraitis 26; Rebs: Jekiri 5 Asts: Henry 10; PIR: Henry 19	Arena: Aleksandar Nikolić Hall; Attendance: 0 Referees: Christos Christodoulou, Mehdi Difallah, Kristaps Konstantinovs

16 October 2020 4	TD Systems Baskonia (Spain)	77–60	(Russia) Khimki	Vitoria-Gasteiz
21:00	Scoring by quarter: 15–18, 20–18, 19–11, 23–13
	Pts: Giedraitis, Polonara 20; Rebs: Polonara 10; Asts: four players 3 PIR: Giedraitis 30	Boxscore	Pts: Zaytsev 17; Rebs: Booker 12; Asts: Zaytsev 8 PIR: Zaytsev 26	Arena: Buesa Arena; Attendance: 600; Referees: Fernando Rocha, Elias Koromilas, Joseph Bissang

30 October 2020 6	TD Systems Baskonia (Spain)	71–72	(Spain) Barcelona	Vitoria-Gasteiz
20:30	Scoring by quarter: 19–20, 18–19, 19–19, 15–14
	Pts: Dragić 15; Rebs: Henry 8 Asts: Henry 7 PIR: Polonara 20	Boxscore	Pts: Mirotić 18; Rebs: Mirotić, Oriola 7 Asts: Calathes 6 PIR: Mirotić 27	Arena: Buesa Arena; Attendance: 0 Referees: Luigi Lamonica, Uroš Nikolić, Sašo Petek

5 November 2020 7	TD Systems Baskonia (Spain)	86–88	(France) LDLC ASVEL	Vitoria-Gasteiz
20:30	Scoring by quarter: 20–26, 23–17, 18–23, 25–22
	Pts: Jekiri 21; Rebs: Polonara 10; Asts: Henry 6 PIR: Henry, Jekiri 31	Boxscore	Pts: Fall 19; Rebs: Kahudi 6 Asts: Diot 7 PIR: Fall 28	Arena: Buesa Arena; Attendance: 0 Referees: Robert Lottermoser, Spiros Gkontas, Mario Majkić

12 November 2020 8	CSKA Moscow (Russia)	89–86	(Spain) TD Systems Baskonia	Moscow
18:00	Scoring by quarter: 23–16, 24–19, 19–23, 23–28
	Pts: Hilliard 31; Rebs: Shengelia 7 Asts: Shengelia 4 PIR: Hilliard 32	Boxscore	Pts: Fall 19; Rebs: Fall 8 Asts: Henry 5 PIR: Fall 27	Arena: Megasport Arena; Attendance: 2,745; Referees: Matej Boltauzer, Jakub Zamojski, Eduard Udyanskyy

17 November 2020 9	TD Systems Baskonia (Spain)	86–68	(Turkey) Fenerbahçe Beko	Vitoria-Gasteiz
20:30	Scoring by quarter: 20–21, 25–15, 19–23, 22–9
	Pts: Peters 25; Rebs: Jekiri 8 Asts: Henry 10; PIR: Peters 31	Boxscore	Pts: Veselý 15; Rebs: Brown, Eddie 4 Asts: Brown 5 PIR: Veselý 18	Arena: Buesa Arena; Attendance: 0 Referees: Luigi Lamonica, Mehdi Difallah, Gytis Vilius

19 November 2020 10	TD Systems Baskonia (Spain)	93–72	(Greece) Panathinaikos OPAP	Vitoria-Gasteiz
20:30	Scoring by quarter: 20–23, 26–16, 20–19, 27–14
	Pts: Peters, Vildoza 19; Rebs: Jekiri 10; Asts: Henry 12; PIR: Henry, Peters 25	Boxscore	Pts: Papapetrou 17; Rebs: Papagiannis 10; Asts: Sant-Roos 6 PIR: Papagiannis 16	Arena: Buesa Arena; Attendance: 0 Referees: Oļegs Latiševs, Piotr Pastusiak, Tomislav Hordov

23 November 2020 3	TD Systems Baskonia (Spain)	70–77	(Russia) Zenit Saint Petersburg	Vitoria-Gasteiz
19:30	Scoring by quarter: 13–10, 15–24, 23–22, 19–21
	Pts: Giedraitis 15; Rebs: Jekiri 7 Asts: Vildoza 6 PIR: Giedraitis 16	Boxscore	Pts: Ponitka 18; Rebs: Ponitka 8 Asts: Pangos 10; PIR: Ponitka 28	Arena: Buesa Arena; Attendance: 0 Referees: Saša Pukl, Fernando Rocha, Uroš Obrkneže

26 November 2020 11	Olympiacos (Greece)	76–90	(Spain) TD Systems Baskonia	Piraeus
20:00	Scoring by quarter: 15–23, 16–24, 27–20, 18–23
	Pts: Printezis, Sloukas 15; Rebs: Martin 8 Asts: McKissic, Sloukas 3 PIR: Martin 19	Boxscore	Pts: Dragić 18; Rebs: Fall 7 Asts: Henry 11; PIR: Henry 24	Arena: Peace and Friendship Stadium; Attendance: 0 Referees: Ilija Belošević, Sreten Radović, Joseph Bissang

4 December 2020 12	Anadolu Efes (Turkey)	59–77	(Spain) TD Systems Baskonia	Istanbul
17:30	Scoring by quarter: 20–17, 17–25, 13–21, 9–14
	Pts: Larkin 8 Rebs: Singleton 6 Asts: Larkin 5 PIR: Singleton 9	Boxscore	Pts: Peters 18; Rebs: Jekiri 8 Asts: Giedraitis 6 PIR: Peters 20	Arena: Sinan Erdem Dome; Attendance: 0 Referees: Robert Lottermoser, Milivoje Jovčić, Sašo Petek

10 December 2020 13	TD Systems Baskonia (Spain)	63–67	(Israel) Maccabi Tel Aviv	Vitoria-Gasteiz
21:00	Scoring by quarter: 20–12, 13–25, 21–19, 9–11
	Pts: Polonara 15; Rebs: Polonara 8 Asts: Polonara 6 PIR: Polonara 28	Boxscore	Pts: Dorsey 15; Rebs: Dorsey, Hunter 5 Asts: Jones, Wilbekin 4 PIR: Hunter 18	Arena: Buesa Arena; Attendance: 0 Referees: Luigi Lamonica, Spiros Gkontas, Josip Radojković

15 December 2020 14	Žalgiris (Lithuania)	92–73	(Spain) TD Systems Baskonia	Kaunas
19:00	Scoring by quarter: 25–22, 19–14, 24–11, 24–26
	Pts: Milaknis 15; Rebs: Rubit 7 Asts: Grigonis, Jokubaitis 5 PIR: Lekavičius 16	Boxscore	Pts: Fall 14; Rebs: Polonara 7 Asts: Henry 9 PIR: Fall 19	Arena: Žalgirio Arena; Attendance: 0 Referees: Sreten Radović, Emin Moğulkoç, Amit Balak

18 December 2020 15	Bayern Munich (Germany)	77–66	(Spain) TD Systems Baskonia	Munich
19:30	Scoring by quarter: 18–15, 20–15, 20–20, 19–16
	Pts: Reynolds 21; Rebs: Reynolds 9 Asts: four players 3 PIR: Reynolds 29	Boxscore	Pts: Dragić 13; Rebs: Polonara 11; Asts: Henry 10; PIR: Polonara 17	Arena: Audi Dome; Attendance: 0 Referees: Damir Javor, Mehdi Difallah, Uroš Obrknežević

23 December 2020 16	A|X Armani Exchange Milan (Italy)	79–84	(Spain) TD Systems Baskonia	Milan
20:45	Scoring by quarter: 19–23, 22–22, 16–18, 22–21
	Pts: Punter 15; Rebs: LeDay 8 Asts: Rodríguez 5 PIR: LeDay, Rodríguez 12	Boxscore	Pts: Dragić 16; Rebs: Jekiri 12; Asts: Henry 8 PIR: Jekiri 25	Arena: Mediolanum Forum; Attendance: 0 Referees: Ilija Belošević, Borys Ryzhyk, Tomislav Hordov

29 December 2020 17	TD Systems Baskonia (Spain)	71–70	(Spain) Valencia Basket	Vitoria-Gasteiz
21:00	Scoring by quarter: 17–30, 22–17, 16–11, 16–12
	Pts: Polonara 18; Rebs: Jekiri 8 Asts: Henry 6 PIR: Polonara 26	Boxscore	Pts: Kalinić 16; Rebs: Dubljević 8 Asts: Prepelič, Van Rossom 4 PIR: Kalinić 20	Arena: Buesa Arena; Attendance: 0 Referees: Robert Lottermoser, Emin Moğulkoç, Sébastien Clivaz

5 January 2021 5	ALBA Berlin (Germany)	95–91	(Spain) TD Systems Baskonia	Berlin
19:00	Scoring by quarter: 25–19, 20–25, 29–28, 21–19
	Pts: Granger 21; Rebs: Thiemann 5 Asts: Granger 6 PIR: Granger 22	Boxscore	Pts: Polonara 18; Rebs: Polonara 10; Asts: Henry 9 PIR: Dragić 24	Arena: Mercedes-Benz Arena; Attendance: 0 Referees: Jakub Zamojski, Rain Peerandi, Saulius Racys

7 January 2021 18	TD Systems Baskonia (Spain)	95–93	(Russia) CSKA Moscow	Vitoria-Gasteiz
21:00	Scoring by quarter: 31–19, 15–26, 33–22, 16–26
	Pts: Henry, Polonara 18; Rebs: Fall 9 Asts: Henry 10; PIR: Henry 27	Boxscore	Pts: James 20; Rebs: Bolomboy, Shengelia 9 Asts: James 7 PIR: James 25	Arena: Buesa Arena; Attendance: 0 Referees: Luigi Lamonica, Saša Pukl, Joseph Bissang

12 January 2021 19	Fenerbahçe Beko (Turkey)	96–76	(Spain) TD Systems Baskonia	Istanbul
18:45	Scoring by quarter: 28–18, 23–23, 24–15, 21–20
	Pts: de Colo 27; Rebs: Düverioğlu, Gudurić 7 Asts: Gudurić 6 PIR: de Colo 30	Boxscore	Pts: Peters 15; Rebs: Peters 5 Asts: Polonara, Vildoza 5 PIR: Polonara 18	Arena: Ülker Sports and Event Hall; Attendance: 150; Referees: Damir Javor, Milivoje Jovčić, Anne Panther

14 January 2021 20	Maccabi Tel Aviv (Israel)	91–82	(Spain) TD Systems Baskonia	Tel Aviv
20:05	Scoring by quarter: 26–21, 21–22, 21–17, 23–22
	Pts: Bryant, Hunter 14; Rebs: Hunter 5 Asts: Bryant, Wilbekin 4 PIR: Bryant, Hunter 20	Boxscore	Pts: Henry 19; Rebs: four players 5 Asts: Henry 8 PIR: Henry 24	Arena: Menora Mivtachim Arena; Attendance: 0 Referees: Carmelo Paternicò, Uroš Nikolić, Mykola Ambrosov

22 January 2021 21	TD Systems Baskonia (Spain)	77–84	(Germany) ALBA Berlin	Vitoria-Gasteiz
21:00	Scoring by quarter: 18–21, 32–25, 11–21, 16–17
	Pts: Polonara 23; Rebs: Polonara 9 Asts: Henry 9 PIR: Polonara 27	Boxscore	Pts: Siva 14; Rebs: Sikma 8 Asts: Granger 8 PIR: Granger 17	Arena: Buesa Arena; Attendance: 0 Referees: Borys Ryzhyk, Gytis Vilius, Sinan İşgüder

27 January 2021 22	LDLC ASVEL (France)	83–77	(Spain) TD Systems Baskonia	Villeurbanne
20:45	Scoring by quarter: 17–26, 18–20, 23–7, 25–24
	Pts: Lighty 21; Rebs: Bako 5 Asts: Lighty 3 PIR: Lighty 21	Boxscore	Pts: Peters 15; Rebs: Jekiri 8 Asts: Vildoza 7 PIR: Fall, Polonara 15	Arena: Astroballe; Attendance: 0 Referees: Saša Pukl, Piotr Pastusiak, Saulius Racys

29 January 2021 23	TD Systems Baskonia (Spain)	81–68	(Lithuania) Žalgiris	Vitoria-Gasteiz
21:00	Scoring by quarter: 21–20, 24–16, 16–12, 20–20
	Pts: Henry 19; Rebs: Jekiri, Peters 7 Asts: Peters 5 PIR: Peters 23	Boxscore	Pts: Grigonis 17; Rebs: Lauvergne 7 Asts: Lauvergne, Walkup 4 PIR: Lauvergne 21	Arena: Buesa Arena; Attendance: 0 Referees: Luigi Lamonica, Emin Moğulkoç, Rain Peerandi

5 February 2021 24	Real Madrid (Spain)	64–84	(Spain) TD Systems Baskonia	Madrid
21:00	Scoring by quarter: 15–28, 19–9, 18–23, 12–24
	Pts: Abalde 12; Rebs: Tavares 8 Asts: Alocén 4 PIR: Deck 17	Boxscore	Pts: Polonara 18; Rebs: Sedekerskis 7 Asts: Henry 10; PIR: Vildoza 19	Arena: WiZink Center; Attendance: 0 Referees: Robert Lottermoser, Oļegs Latiševs, Robert Vyklický

18 February 2021 25	Khimki (Russia)	67–89	(Spain) TD Systems Baskonia	Khimki
18:00	Scoring by quarter: 14–24, 23–23, 20–24, 10–18
	Pts: Shved 16; Rebs: Shved 4 Asts: Shved 10; PIR: Shved 16	Boxscore	Pts: Fall 14; Rebs: Fall, Polonara 9 Asts: Henry 7 PIR: Fall 21	Arena: Mytishchi Arena; Attendance: 461; Referees: Tomislav Hordov, Spiros Gkontas, Huseyin Celik

26 February 2021 26	TD Systems Baskonia (Spain)	87–67	(Serbia) Crvena zvezda mts	Vitoria-Gasteiz
21:00	Scoring by quarter: 21–16, 27–11, 18–21, 21–19
	Pts: Fall 20; Rebs: Polonara 8 Asts: Henry 6 PIR: Fall 23	Boxscore	Pts: Loyd 14; Rebs: Kuzmić 7 Asts: Loyd, Uskoković 3 PIR: Walden 14	Arena: Buesa Arena; Referees: Borys Ryzhyk, Carmelo Paternicò, Hugues Thépenier

3 March 2021 27	TD Systems Baskonia (Spain)	91–66	(Greece) Olympiacos	Vitoria-Gasteiz
21:00	Scoring by quarter: 15–21, 28–11, 25–26, 23–8
	Pts: Vildoza 19; Rebs: Henry, Vildoza 8 Asts: Polonara 5 PIR: Vildoza 27	Boxscore	Pts: Jean-Charles 15; Rebs: Ellis, Vezenkov 9 Asts: Sloukas 7 PIR: Ellis 21	Arena: Buesa Arena; Referees: Damir Javor, Sašo Petek, Tomasz Trawicki

5 March 2021 28	Barcelona (Spain)	71–57	(Spain) TD Systems Baskonia	Barcelona
21:00	Scoring by quarter: 25–4, 8–22, 17–19, 21–12
	Pts: Mirotić 18; Rebs: Mirotić 10; Asts: Calathes, Higgins 4 PIR: Mirotić 26	Boxscore	Pts: Fall 12; Rebs: Jekiri, Polonara 6 Asts: Henry 8 PIR: Polonara 14	Arena: Palau Blaugrana; Attendance: 0 Referees: Luigi Lamonica, Sreten Radović, Mario Majkić

12 March 2021 29	TD Systems Baskonia (Spain)	78–71	(Germany) Bayern Munich	Vitoria-Gasteiz
21:00	Scoring by quarter: 17–15, 16–18, 27–12, 18–26
	Pts: three players 15; Rebs: Jekiri 9 Asts: Henry 10; PIR: Jekiri 27	Boxscore	Pts: Reynolds 18; Rebs: Reynolds 10; Asts: Reynolds 7 PIR: Reynolds 34	Arena: Buesa Arena; Attendance: 0 Referees: Saša Pukl, Tomislav Hordov, Uroš Nikolić

18 March 2021 30	Zenit Saint Petersburg (Russia)	75–79	(Spain) TD Systems Baskonia	Saint Petersburg
18:00	Scoring by quarter: 14–17, 31–15, 14–13, 16–34
	Pts: Ponitka 15; Rebs: Ponitka 5 Asts: Pangos 8 PIR: Ponitka 18	Boxscore	Pts: Peters 17; Rebs: Polonara 7 Asts: Henry 4 PIR: Peters 22	Arena: Sibur Arena; Attendance: 2553; Referees: Christos Christodoulou, Joseph Bissang, Sinan İşgüder

26 March 2021 31	TD Systems Baskonia (Spain)	86–69	(Italy) A|X Armani Exchange Milan	Vitoria-Gasteiz
21:00	Scoring by quarter: 10–16, 23–16, 27–13, 26–24
	Pts: Henry 19; Rebs: Polonara 13; Asts: Henry 6 PIR: Polonara 28	Boxscore	Pts: Punter 13; Rebs: Brooks 7 Asts: Rodríguez 4 PIR: Brooks 16	Arena: Buesa Arena; Attendance: 0 Referees: Matej Boltauzer, Emin Moğulkoç, Sérgio Silva

30 March 2021 32	Panathinaikos OPAP (Greece)	82–97	(Spain) TD Systems Baskonia	Athens
20:00	Scoring by quarter: 21–25, 20–24, 18–23, 23–25
	Pts: Mitoglou 22; Rebs: Mitoglou 8 Asts: three players 3 PIR: Mitoglou 28	Boxscore	Pts: Giedraitis 25; Rebs: Polonara 11; Asts: Henry 10; PIR: Polonara 36	Arena: O.A.K.A. Attendance: 0 Referees: Ilija Belošević, Carmelo Paternicò, Milan Nedović

1 April 2021 33	TD Systems Baskonia (Spain)	101–111(OT)	(Turkey) Anadolu Efes	Vitoria-Gasteiz
21:00	Scoring by quarter: 19–22, 22–24, 22–19, 29–27, Overtime: 9–19
	Pts: Polonara 23; Rebs: Polonara 8 Asts: Henry 8 PIR: Polonara 26	Boxscore	Pts: Larkin 30; Rebs: Moerman, Singleton 8 Asts: Simon 6 PIR: Larkin 30	Arena: Buesa Arena; Attendance: 0 Referees: Damir Javor, Piotr Pastusiak, Anne Panther

8 April 2021 34	Valencia Basket (Spain)	86–81	(Spain) TD Systems Baskonia	Valencia
21:00	Scoring by quarter: 25–21, 14–23, 21–15, 26–22
	Pts: Williams 16; Rebs: Dubljević, Tobey 7 Asts: Prepelič, Williams 4 PIR: Williams 25	Boxscore	Pts: Henry 19; Rebs: Sedekerskis 7 Asts: Henry 7 PIR: Henry 22	Arena: La Fonteta; Attendance: 0 Referees: Saša Pukl, Sreten Radović, Joseph Bissang

=== Copa del Rey ===
==== Quarterfinals ====
12 February 2021	TD Systems Baskonia	96–87	Joventut	Madrid
18:30	Scoring by quarter: 28–17, 27–30, 23–21, 18–19
	Pts: Giedraitis, Polonara 19; Rebs: Polonara 6 Asts: Henry 8 PIR: Polonara 29	Boxscore	Pts: Brodziansky 17; Rebs: Tomić 11; Asts: Bassas 6 PIR: Tomić 19	Arena: WiZink Center; Attendance: 0 Referees: Carlos Peruga, Antonio Conde, Jorge Martínez

==== Semifinals ====
13 February 2021	Barça	77–68	TD Systems Baskonia	Madrid
19:00	Scoring by quarter: 15–12, 23–15, 26–20, 13–21
	Pts: Mirotić 16; Rebs: Kuric 7 Asts: Calathes 8 PIR: Mirotić 17	Boxscore	Pts: Henry 19; Rebs: Polonara 8 Asts: Vildoza 4 PIR: Jekiri 23	Arena: WiZink Center; Attendance: 0 Referees: Daniel Hierrezuelo, Antonio Conde, Rafael Serrano

=== Supercopa de España ===
==== Semifinals ====
12 September 2020	TD Systems Baskonia	68–72	Barça	San Cristóbal de La Laguna
18:30	Scoring by quarter: 14–22, 14–13, 17–25, 23–12
	Pts: Peters, Vildoza 14; Rebs: three players 5 Asts: Henry 5 PIR: Peters 15	Boxscore	Pts: Abrines 19; Rebs: Mirotić 6 Asts: Calathes 8 PIR: Abrines, Mirotić 19	Arena: Santiago Martín; Attendance: 0 Referees: José Antonio Martín, Carlos Peruga, Sergio Manuel
