= 2020–21 Valencia Basket season =

Spanish basketball season

Valencia Basket
2020–21 season
- Owner: Juan Roig
- Head coach: Jaume Ponsarnau
- Arena: La Fonteta
- Liga ACB: 4th Seed
- Playoffs: Semifinalist
- EuroLeague: Regular season
- Copa del Rey: Quarterfinalist
Home	Away	Third

The 2020–21 season is Valencia Basket's 35th in existence and the club's 25th consecutive season in the top flight of Spanish basketball and the sixth season in the EuroLeague. It is the third consecutive season under head coach Jaume Ponsarnau.

Times up to 24 October 2020 and from 28 March 2021 are CEST (UTC+2). Times from 25 October 2020 to 27 March 2021 are CET (UTC+1).

== Overview ==
=== Pre-season ===
Although many of its players have been training in the city for days or even weeks, either individually or in small groups, August 19 marked the first time that Valencia Basket brought all of them together for the first collective practice of the 2020–21 season. That group of 14 players under the direction of head coach Jaume Ponsarnau included five newcomers: Martin Hermannsson, Klemen Prepelič, Nikola Kalinić, Derrick Williams and Jaime Pradilla.

Valencia planned to continue working daily, with the exception of the Sunday, on its way to a first preseason game against Joventut on Friday, August 28. Fans were anticipating that the team's very first Turkish Airlines EuroLeague game was at home against LDLC ASVEL on October 1, the opening night of the season.

== Players ==
=== Squad information ===
Note: Flags indicate national team eligibility at FIBA-sanctioned events. Players may hold other non-FIBA nationalities not displayed.

Valencia Basket roster
Players
Coaches

Pos.	No.	Nat.	Name	Ht.	Age
C	14	(Montenegro)	Dubljević, Bojan (C)	2.05 m (6 ft 9 in)	34 – 24 October 1991
PG	24	(Iceland)	Hermannsson, Martin	1.90 m (6 ft 3 in)	31 – 16 September 1994
SF	12	(Serbia)	Kalinić, Nikola	2.03 m (6 ft 8 in)	34 – 8 November 1991
PF	7	(France)	Labeyrie, Louis	2.08 m (6 ft 10 in)	34 – 11 February 1992
SG	2	(Serbia)	Marinković, Vanja	1.98 m (6 ft 6 in)	29 – 9 January 1997
PF	4	(Spain)	Pradilla, Jaime	2.02 m (6 ft 8 in)	25 – 3 January 2001
SG	3	(Slovenia)	Prepelič, Klemen	1.91 m (6 ft 3 in)	33 – 20 October 1992
SF	19	(Spain)	San Emeterio, Fernando	1.99 m (6 ft 6 in)	42 – 1 January 1984
SF	30	(Spain)	Sastre, Joan	2.01 m (6 ft 7 in)	34 – 10 December 1991
C	10	(United States)	Tobey, Mike	2.13 m (7 ft 0 in)	31 – 10 October 1994
PG	9	(Belgium)	Van Rossom, Sam	1.88 m (6 ft 2 in)	40 – 3 June 1986
PG	16	(Spain)	Vives, Guillem	1.92 m (6 ft 4 in)	32 – 16 September 1993
PF	21	(United States)	Williams, Derrick	2.03 m (6 ft 8 in)	35 – 25 May 1991

Head coach

- (Spain) Jaume Ponsarnau

Legend

- (C) Team captain
- Injured

- Roster
Updated: December 16, 2020

=== Depth chart ===
Pos.	Starting 5	Bench 1	Bench 2
C	Bojan Dubljević	Mike Tobey
PF	Derrick Williams	Louis Labeyrie	Jaime Pradilla
SF	Nikola Kalinić	Fernando San Emeterio	Joan Sastre
SG	Klemen Prepelič	Martin Hermannsson	Vanja Marinković
PG	Guillem Vives	Sam Van Rossom

Colours: Blue = homegrown player; Red = non–FIBA Europe player

=== Transactions ===
==== In ====
No.	Pos.	Nat.	Name	Age	Moving from		Type	Ends	Date	Source
3	SG	(Slovenia)	Klemen Prepelič	27	Real Madrid	(Spain)	End of contract	June 2022	4 July 2020	
21	PF	(United States)	Derrick Williams	29	Fenerbahçe Beko	(Turkey)	End of contract	June 2021	8 July 2020	
24	PG	(Iceland)	Martin Hermannsson	25	ALBA Berlin	(Germany)	End of contract	June 2022	10 July 2020	
12	SF	(Serbia)	Nikola Kalinić	28	Fenerbahçe Beko	(Turkey)	End of contract	June 2021	18 July 2020	
4	PF	(Spain)	Jaime Pradilla	19	Casademont Zaragoza	(Spain)	Transfer	June 2024	27 July 2020	

==== Out ====
No.	Pos.	Nat.	Name	Age	Moving to		Type	Date	Source
3	SG	(United States)	Jordan Loyd	26	Crvena zvezda mts	(Serbia)	End of contract	2 July 2020	
12	PF	(Australia)	Brock Motum	29	Galatasaray Doğa Sigorta	(Turkey)	End of contract	4 July 2020	
5	PF	(Senegal)	Maurice Ndour	28	Rytas	(Lithuania)	End of contract	8 July 2020	
42	SF	(Canada)	Aaron Doornekamp	34	Iberostar Tenerife	(Spain)	End of contract	15 July 2020	
6	SG	(Spain)	Alberto Abalde	24	Real Madrid	(Spain)	Transfer	21 July 2020	
1	PG	(Spain)	Quino Colom	32	Crvena zvezda mts	(Serbia)	Transfer	16 December 2020	

== Pre-season and friendlies ==
=== Friendly matches ===
28 August 2020	Joventut	82–94	Valencia Basket	Salou
19:30	Scoring by quarter: 23–34, 18–19, 15–18, 26–23
	Pts: Ribas, Tomić 12	Boxscore	Pts: Sastre 16	Attendance: 0 Referees: Òscar Perea, Juan de Dios Oyón, Arnau Padrós

2 September 2020	Unicaja	75–90	Valencia Basket	Murcia
21:30	Scoring by quarter: 22–32, 17–26, 18–15, 18–17
	Pts: Waczyński 15; Rebs: Thompson 8 Asts: Díaz 6 PIR: Waczyński 10	Boxscore	Pts: San Emeterio 15; Rebs: Dubljević 5 Asts: Vives 5 PIR: San Emeterio 19	Arena: Palacio de Deportes; Attendance: 0 Referees: Fernando Calatrava, Luis Miguel Castillo, Cristóbal Sánchez Cutillas

4 September 2020	UCAM Murcia	59–84	Valencia Basket	Murcia
20:30	Scoring by quarter: 12–17, 16–19, 16–23, 15–25
	Pts: DiLeo 11; Rebs: Cățe 8 Asts: Lima 6 PIR: Cățe, Lima 14	Boxscore	Pts: Marinković 18; Rebs: Labeyrie 5 Asts: Hermannsson 4 PIR: Marinković 20	Arena: Palacio de Deportes; Attendance: 0 Referees: Emilio Pérez Pizarro, Cristóbal Sánchez Cutillas, Vicente Martínez Silla

=== Turkish Airlines EuroLeague We're back Preseason Tour ===
15 September 2020	Valencia Basket (Spain)	84–76	(Germany) Bayern Munich	Valencia
20:00	Scoring by quarter: 24–18, 20–18, 19–24, 21–16
	Pts: Tobey 17; Rebs: Dubljević, Labeyrie 5 Asts: Van Rossom 5 PIR: Tobey 20	Boxscore	Pts: Weiler-Babb 14; Rebs: Weiler-Babb 5 Asts: Radošević, Thomas 3 PIR: Šiško 14	Arena: La Fonteta; Attendance: 375; Referees: Miguel Ángel Pérez Pérez, Carlos Peruga, Carlos Cortés

16 September 2020	LDLC ASVEL (France)	66–77	(Spain) Valencia Basket	Valencia
20:00	Scoring by quarter: 15–29, 21–17, 14–14, 16–17
	Pts: three players 11; Rebs: Hayes 6 Asts: Cole 4 PIR: Howard 12	Boxscore	Pts: Dubljević 14; Rebs: Labeyrie 8 Asts: Vives 5 PIR: Dubljević 16	Arena: La Fonteta; Attendance: 375; Referees: Miguel Ángel Pérez Pérez, Carlos Cortés, Jordi Aliaga

== Competitions ==
=== Overview ===
Competition	First match	Last match	Starting round	Final position	Record							
Competition	First match	Last match	Starting round	Final position	Pld	W	D	L	PF	PA	PD	Win %
Liga ACB	20 September 2020	10 June 2021	Round 1	Semifinalist	42	27	0	15	3,569	3,380	+189	64.29
EuroLeague	1 October 2020	8 April 2021	Round 1	9th	34	19	0	15	2,783	2,762	+21	55.88
Copa del Rey	11 February 2021		Quarterfinals	Quarterfinalist	1	0	0	1	74	85	−11	0.00
Total					77	46	0	31	6,426	6,227	+199	59.74

Source: Competitions

=== Liga ACB ===
==== League table ====
Pos	Team	Pld	W	L	PF	PA	PD	Qualification or relegation
2	Barça	36	32	4	3162	2621	+541	Qualification to playoffs
3	Lenovo Tenerife	36	27	9	3147	2861	+286	Qualification to playoffs
4	Valencia Basket	36	24	12	3107	2917	+190	Qualification to playoffs
5	TD Systems Baskonia	36	23	13	2952	2814	+138	Qualification to playoffs
6	Hereda San Pablo Burgos	36	22	14	3130	2995	+135	Qualification to playoffs

Source: ACB
Rules for classification: 1) Win–loss record; 2) Head–to–head record; 3) Head–to–head point difference; 4) Point difference; 5) Points scored; 6) Sum of quotients of points scored (Note: Head–to–head record is used only after all the matches between the teams in question have been played)

==== Results summary ====
Overall						Home					Away				
Pld	W	L	PF	PA	PD	W	L	PF	PA	PD	W	L	PF	PA	PD
36	24	12	3107	2917	+190	12	6	1618	1492	+126	12	6	1489	1425	+64

Source: Competitive matches

==== Results by round ====
Round	1	2	3	4	5	6	7	8	9	10	11	12	13	14	15	16	17	18	19	20	21	22	23	24	25	26	27	28	29	30	31	32	33	34	35	36	37	38
Ground	A	H	A	A	H	R	H	A	H	H	A	H	A	A	H	H	A	H	A	A	H	A	H	A	H	A	H	A	H	A	H	R	H	A	H	A	A	H
Result	L	W	W	L	L	R	W	W	L	L	W	L	W	W	W	W	W	W	W	W	W	W	W	L	W	L	L	L	L	W	W	R	W	W	W	W	L	W
Position	12	8	7	8	10	13	9	8	11	10	11	12	10	8	8	8	7	6	6	6	6	6	5	6	5	5	5	6	6	5	5	6	5	5	5	4	4	4

Source: Competitive matches
A = Away; H = Home; W = Win; L = Loss; R = Rest

==== Matches ====
20 September 2020 1	TD Systems Baskonia	76–73	Valencia Basket	Vitoria-Gasteiz
18:30	Scoring by quarter: 25–16, 19–19, 14–20, 18–18
	Pts: Vildoza 21; Rebs: Giedraitis 7 Asts: Henry 7 PIR: Vildoza 17	Boxscore	Pts: Dubljević, Van Rossom 12; Rebs: Tobey 7 Asts: Prepelič 4 PIR: Van Rossom 21	Arena: Buesa Arena; Attendance: 0 Referees: Emilio Pérez, Juan de Dios Oyón, Joaquín García

25 September 2020 2	Valencia Basket	91–76	MoraBanc Andorra	Valencia
17:00	Scoring by quarter: 21–13, 18–23, 27–27, 25–13
	Pts: Hermannsson 14; Rebs: Labeyrie 8 Asts: Hermannsson 4 PIR: Kalinić 24	Boxscore	Pts: Pérez 18; Rebs: Pérez 9 Asts: Paulí 5 PIR: Pérez 22	Arena: La Fonteta; Attendance: 0 Referees: Raúl Zamorano, Juan Carlos García, Carlos Merino

27 September 2020 3	Baxi Manresa	74–82	Valencia Basket	Manresa
20:00	Scoring by quarter: 23–29, 17–19, 22–13, 12–21
	Pts: Báez 19; Rebs: Eatherton 8 Asts: Tabu 5 PIR: Báez 17	Boxscore	Pts: Dubljević 17; Rebs: Dubljević 5 Asts: Vives 4 PIR: Dubljević 19	Arena: Nou Congost; Attendance: 0 Referees: Carlos Cortés, Sergio Manuel, Jordi Aliaga

4 October 2020 4	Coosur Real Betis	95–85	Valencia Basket	Seville
20:00	Scoring by quarter: 23–18, 24–24, 18–18, 30–25
	Pts: Feldeine 26; Rebs: Niang 8 Asts: three players 3 PIR: Feldeine 30	Boxscore	Pts: Dubljević 14; Rebs: Dubljević 9 Asts: Van Rossom 5 PIR: Dubljević 18	Arena: San Pablo; Attendance: 0 Referees: Alberto Baena, Arnau Padrós, Daniel Hierrezuelo

11 October 2020 5	Valencia Basket	66–71	Unicaja	Valencia
18:30	Scoring by quarter: 20–18, 13–10, 18–21, 15–22
	Pts: Dubljević 15; Rebs: Dubljević 8 Asts: Vives 3 PIR: Dubljević 21	Boxscore	Pts: Abromaitis 20; Rebs: Abromaitis, Bouteille 5 Asts: Díaz 7 PIR: three players 18	Arena: La Fonteta; Attendance: 0 Referees: Iyán González, Luis Miguel Castillo, Óscar Perea

24 October 2020 7	Valencia Basket	93–84	Casademont Zaragoza	Valencia
18:00	Scoring by quarter: 17–27, 22–28, 23–19, 31–10
	Pts: Dubljević 21; Rebs: Dubljević 6 Asts: Prepelič 4 PIR: Dubljević 26	Boxscore	Pts: Ennis 22; Rebs: Hlinason 9 Asts: Seeley 5 PIR: Hlinason 20	Arena: La Fonteta; Attendance: 0 Referees: Vicente Martínez, Francisco Araña, Emilio Pérez

27 October 2020 8	Monbus Obradoiro	77–78	Valencia Basket	Santiago de Compostela
21:15	Scoring by quarter: 21–19, 12–20, 22–18, 22–21
	Pts: Cohen 17; Rebs: Cohen 8 Asts: Pozas 4 PIR: Cohen 29	Boxscore	Pts: Pradilla 16; Rebs: Tobey 13; Asts: Kalinić 4 PIR: Dubljević 17	Arena: Multiusos Fontes do Sar; Attendance: 0 Referees: Fabio Fernández, Rafael Serrano, Miguel Ángel Pérez

1 November 2020 9	Valencia Basket	78–86	Real Madrid	Valencia
18:30	Scoring by quarter: 6–28, 19–22, 30–20, 23–16
	Pts: Labeyrie 26; Rebs: four players 4 Asts: Van Rossom 6 PIR: Labeyrie 32	Boxscore	Pts: Carroll 17; Rebs: Randolph 7 Asts: Campazzo 4 PIR: Thompkins 22	Arena: La Fonteta; Attendance: 0 Referees: Joaquín García, Arnau Padrós, Antonio Conde

8 November 2020 10	Valencia Basket	81–99	Hereda San Pablo Burgos	Valencia
20:00	Scoring by quarter: 14–24, 25–29, 21–20, 21–26
	Pts: Williams 15; Rebs: Labeyrie 6 Asts: Dubljević 7 PIR: Labeyrie 20	Boxscore	Pts: Rivero 25; Rebs: Rivero 6 Asts: Cook, Renfroe 8 PIR: Rivero 30	Arena: La Fonteta; Attendance: 0 Referees: Jordi Aliaga, Martín Caballero, Jacobo Rial

22 November 2020 12	Valencia Basket	89–95	Iberostar Tenerife	Valencia
17:00	Scoring by quarter: 16–22, 22–20, 30–18, 21–35
	Pts: Prepelič 20; Rebs: Labeyrie 11; Asts: Kalinić 6 PIR: Labeyrie 26	Boxscore	Pts: Huertas 22; Rebs: Doornekamp 7 Asts: Huertas 7 PIR: Huertas 26	Arena: La Fonteta; Attendance: 0 Referees: Carlos Peruga, Sergio Manuel, Esperanza Mendoza

1 December 2020 17	Barça	90–100	Valencia Basket	Barcelona
21:15	Scoring by quarter: 22–32, 29–19, 19–19, 20–30
	Pts: Mirotić 20; Rebs: Mirotić 9 Asts: Heurtel, Oriola 4 PIR: Mirotić 20	Boxscore	Pts: Williams 25; Rebs: Dubljević, Kalinić 6 Asts: Prepelič 7 PIR: Dubljević 33	Arena: Palau Blaugrana; Attendance: 0 Referees: Juan Carlos García, Luis Miguel Castillo, Vicente Martínez

5 December 2020 13	Urbas Fuenlabrada	61–68	Valencia Basket	Fuenlabrada
20:45	Scoring by quarter: 16–21, 15–9, 6–22, 24–16
	Pts: Meindl 18; Rebs: Thompson 10; Asts: Trimble 4 PIR: Trimble 17	Boxscore	Pts: Kalinić 12; Rebs: Dubljević 9 Asts: Van Rossom 4 PIR: Kalinić 16	Arena: Fernando Martín; Attendance: 0 Referees: Fernando Calatrava, Alberto Sánchez, Roberto Lucas

13 December 2020 14	Movistar Estudiantes	81–86	Valencia Basket	Madrid
12:00	Scoring by quarter: 27–15, 13–19, 21–21, 20–31
	Pts: Gentile 15; Rebs: four players 5 Asts: Avramović, Gentile 6 PIR: Avramović 20	Boxscore	Pts: Dubljević 20; Rebs: Dubljević, Labeyrie 6 Asts: Dubljević 6 PIR: Dubljević 28	Arena: WiZink Center; Attendance: 0 Referees: Daniel Hierrezuelo, Francisco Araña, Yasmina Alcaraz

20 December 2020 15	Valencia Basket	89–78	UCAM Murcia	Valencia
20:00	Scoring by quarter: 14–22, 28–21, 18–19, 29–16
	Pts: Van Rossom 16; Rebs: Kalinić 9 Asts: Van Rossom 7 PIR: Van Rossom 24	Boxscore	Pts: Frankamp 21; Rebs: Lima 9 Asts: Lima 8 PIR: Lima 18	Arena: La Fonteta; Attendance: 0 Referees: Miguel Ángel Pérez, Vicente Bultó, Cristóbal Sánchez

27 December 2020 16	Valencia Basket	101–75	Acunsa GBC	Valencia
18:45	Scoring by quarter: 30–16, 33–22, 21–18, 17–19
	Pts: Hermannsson, Tobey 17; Rebs: Tobey 7 Asts: Hermannsson 5 PIR: Tobey 23	Boxscore	Pts: Echenique 15; Rebs: three players 6 Asts: Faggiano, Oroz 5 PIR: Radončić 16	Arena: La Fonteta; Attendance: 0 Referees: Antonio Conde, Rubén Sánchez, Alberto Baena

2 January 2021 18	Valencia Basket	101–85	Herbalife Gran Canaria	Valencia
20:45	Scoring by quarter: 29–21, 27–24, 18–17, 27–23
	Pts: Hermannsson, Kalinić 15; Rebs: Tobey 8 Asts: Van Rossom 10; PIR: Van Rossom 23	Boxscore	Pts: Slaughter 17; Rebs: Shurna, Stević 6 Asts: Slaughter 4 PIR: Shurna, Stević 14	Arena: La Fonteta; Attendance: 0 Referees: Emilio Pérez, Javier Torres, Fabio Fernández

4 January 2021 11	Joventut	80–91	Valencia Basket	Badalona
21:15	Scoring by quarter: 17–19, 19–25, 14–27, 30–20
	Pts: Tomić 15; Rebs: Brodziansky 6 Asts: Ventura 5 PIR: Birgander 16	Boxscore	Pts: Sastre, Tobey 15; Rebs: Labeyrie 9 Asts: three players 4 PIR: Labeyrie 19	Arena: Palau Municipal d'Esports; Attendance: 0 Referees: Carlos Cortés, Jorge Martínez, David Sánchez

9 January 2021 19	RETAbet Bilbao Basket	73–106	Valencia Basket	Bilbao
18:00	Scoring by quarter: 21–25, 11–22, 24–31, 17–28
	Pts: Aminu 17; Rebs: Miniotas 8 Asts: Brown 4 PIR: Aminu 18	Boxscore	Pts: Tobey 16; Rebs: Labeyrie 5 Asts: Hermannsson 7 PIR: Pradilla 24	Arena: Bilbao Arena; Attendance: 0 Referees: Carlos Peruga, Sergio Manuel, Rubén Sánchez

17 January 2021 20	Hereda San Pablo Burgos	78–83	Valencia Basket	Burgos
18:00	Scoring by quarter: 18–23, 17–17, 25–22, 18–21
	Pts: McFadden 25; Rebs: Horton 8 Asts: Cook 11; PIR: McFadden, Rivero 22	Boxscore	Pts: Labeyrie 21; Rebs: Labeyrie 6 Asts: Hermannsson 5 PIR: Labeyrie 32	Arena: Coliseum Burgos; Attendance: 0 Referees: Antonio Conde, Martín Caballero, Iyán González

24 January 2021 21	Valencia Basket	83–61	TD Systems Baskonia	Valencia
18:30	Scoring by quarter: 14–18, 21–13, 23–12, 25–18
	Pts: Kalinić 14; Rebs: Tobey 10; Asts: Prepelič 5 PIR: Kalinić, Tobey 18	Boxscore	Pts: Dragić 12; Rebs: Sedekerskis 6 Asts: Vildoza 7 PIR: Polonara 14	Arena: La Fonteta; Attendance: 0 Referees: Juan Carlos García, Jorge Martínez, Vicente Martínez

31 January 2021 22	Unicaja	85–89	Valencia Basket	Málaga
18:30	Scoring by quarter: 21–18, 13–16, 24–27, 27–28
	Pts: Fernández 19; Rebs: three players 5 Asts: Fernández 8 PIR: Fernández 21	Boxscore	Pts: Prepelič 25; Rebs: Dubljević, Tobey 8 Asts: Van Rossom 5 PIR: Tobey 34	Arena: Martín Carpena; Attendance: 0 Referees: Miguel Ángel Pérez, Juan de Dios Oyón, Alberto Baena

6 February 2021 23	Valencia Basket	89–81	Coosur Real Betis	Valencia
20:45	Scoring by quarter: 12–22, 26–15, 30–22, 21–22
	Pts: Dubljević 19; Rebs: Dubljević 9 Asts: Van Rossom 7 PIR: Dubljević 29	Boxscore	Pts: Feldeine 20; Rebs: Jordan 8 Asts: Campbell 5 PIR: Ouattara 18	Arena: La Fonteta; Attendance: 0 Referees: Jordi Aliaga, Sergio Manuel, David Sánchez

28 February 2021 24	MoraBanc Andorra	84–72	Valencia Basket	Andorra la Vella
12:30	Scoring by quarter: 12–17, 27–17, 22–17, 23–21
	Pts: Hannah 26; Rebs: Olumuyiwa 9 Asts: Hannah 4 PIR: Hannah 34	Boxscore	Pts: Prepelič 17; Rebs: Dubljević 5 Asts: Van Rossom 6 PIR: Van Rossom 22	Arena: M.I. Govern Andorra; Referees: Carlos Peruga, Alberto Sánchez, Cristóbal Sánchez

7 March 2021 25	Valencia Basket	112–82	Baxi Manresa	Valencia
20:00	Scoring by quarter: 25–21, 29–32, 29–15, 29–14
	Pts: Tobey 21; Rebs: Tobey 6 Asts: Hermannsson 7 PIR: Tobey 28	Boxscore	Pts: Eatherton 18; Rebs: Hinrichs 6 Asts: Eatherton 6 PIR: Eatherton 19	Arena: La Fonteta; Attendance: 0 Referees: Juan Carlos García, Raúl Zamorano, Andrés Fernández

14 March 2021 26	Acunsa GBC	78–60	Valencia Basket	San Sebastián
17:00	Scoring by quarter: 20–8, 16–22, 18–14, 24–16
	Pts: Okouo 20; Rebs: Okouo, Radončić 9 Asts: Faggiano 4 PIR: Radončić 31	Boxscore	Pts: Labeyrie, Prepelič 15; Rebs: Williams 8 Asts: Hermannsson 5 PIR: Labeyrie 17	Arena: Donostia Arena; Referees: Carlos Cortés, Francisco Araña, Jacobo Rial

21 March 2021 27	Valencia Basket	64–80	Barça	Valencia
18:30	Scoring by quarter: 14–17, 15–24, 18–17, 17–22
	Pts: Tobey 13; Rebs: Pradilla, Tobey 5 Asts: Prepelič 8 PIR: Tobey 20	Boxscore	Pts: Abrines 23; Rebs: Abrines, Mirotić 5 Asts: Calathes 8 PIR: Abrines 28	Arena: La Fonteta; Attendance: 0 Referees: Carlos Peruga, Javier Torres, Alberto Baena

28 March 2021 28	Iberostar Tenerife	90–86	Valencia Basket	San Cristóbal de La Laguna
18:30	Scoring by quarter: 20–20, 19–24, 22–20, 29–22
	Pts: Shermadini 21; Rebs: Shermadini 7 Asts: Huertas 9 PIR: Shermadini 32	Boxscore	Pts: Dubljević 18; Rebs: Dubljević 6 Asts: Dubljević 6 PIR: Dubljević 27	Arena: Santiago Martín; Referees: Miguel Ángel Pérez, Rafael Serrano, Rubén Sánchez

4 April 2021 29	Valencia Basket	89–102	Joventut	Valencia
17:00	Scoring by quarter: 21–24, 22–23, 19–24, 27–31
	Pts: Labeyrie, Van Rossom 13; Rebs: Dubljević 7 Asts: Van Rossom 5 PIR: Van Rossom 16	Boxscore	Pts: Ribas 17; Rebs: Tomić 6 Asts: Dimitrijević 7 PIR: Ribas 20	Arena: La Fonteta; Attendance: 0 Referees: Jordi Aliaga, Luis Miguel Castillo, Esperanza Mendoza

11 April 2021 30	Casademont Zaragoza	76–85	Valencia Basket	Zaragoza
20:00	Scoring by quarter: 21–21, 17–24, 19–19, 19–21
	Pts: three players 12; Rebs: Hlinason 9 Asts: Ennis 3 PIR: Hlinason 18	Boxscore	Pts: Prepelič 18; Rebs: Dubljević, Tobey 5 Asts: Dubljević 7 PIR: Kalinić 17	Arena: Pabellón Príncipe Felipe; Attendance: 0 Referees: Fernando Calatrava, Alberto Sánchez, David Sánchez

16 April 2021 31	Valencia Basket	97–82	Monbus Obradoiro	Valencia
21:15	Scoring by quarter: 28–18, 24–23, 25–23, 20–18
	Pts: Kalinić, Prepelič 16; Rebs: Labeyrie, Tobey 4 Asts: Van Rossom 8 PIR: Kalinić 22	Boxscore	Pts: Enoch 24; Rebs: Enoch 6 Asts: Beliauskas 5 PIR: Enoch 27	Arena: La Fonteta; Referees: Juan Carlos García, Sergio Manuel, Carlos Merino

25 April 2021 33	Valencia Basket	99–90	RETAbet Bilbao Basket	Valencia
20:00	Scoring by quarter: 17–33, 25–18, 30–21, 27–18
	Pts: Prepelič 22; Rebs: Dubljević 10; Asts: Hermannsson 5 PIR: Dubljević 31	Boxscore	Pts: Kulboka 20; Rebs: Balvín 6 Asts: Athinaiou 5 PIR: Jenkins 23	Arena: La Fonteta; Attendance: 0 Referees: Miguel Ángel Pérez, Arnau Padrós, Yasmina Alcaraz

30 April 2021 34	UCAM Murcia	66–80	Valencia Basket	Murcia
21:15	Scoring by quarter: 16–15, 12–29, 25–20, 13–16
	Pts: Cățe, Rojas 12; Rebs: Cățe 10; Asts: Bellas, Taylor 4 PIR: Rojas 15	Boxscore	Pts: Dubljević 26; Rebs: Prepelič 6 Asts: Hermannsson 4 PIR: Dubljević 24	Arena: Palacio de Deportes; Attendance: 0 Referees: Óscar Perea, Jorge Martínez, Joaquín García

2 May 2021 35	Valencia Basket	100–89	Movistar Estudiantes	Valencia
17:00	Scoring by quarter: 34–29, 18–23, 24–21, 24–16
	Pts: Dubljević 22; Rebs: Kalinić 6 Asts: Hermannsson 5 PIR: Kalinić 28	Boxscore	Pts: Đurišić 24; Rebs: Arteaga 15; Asts: Cvetković 8 PIR: Đurišić 33	Arena: La Fonteta; Attendance: 0 Referees: Fernando Calatrava, Juan de Dios Oyón, Carlos Merino

9 May 2021 36	Real Madrid	69–79	Valencia Basket	Madrid
18:30	Scoring by quarter: 12–27, 15–16, 16–17, 26–19
	Pts: Poirier 16; Rebs: Poirier 7 Asts: three players 3 PIR: Poirier 19	Boxscore	Pts: Tobey 16; Rebs: Dubljević, Kalinić 9 Asts: Prepelič, Van Rossom 4 PIR: Labeyrie 17	Arena: WiZink Center; Attendance: 0 Referees: Carlos Cortés, Martín Caballero, Andrés Fernández

19 May 2021 37	Herbalife Gran Canaria	92–86	Valencia Basket	Las Palmas
21:15	Scoring by quarter: 18–24, 26–23, 15–20, 33–19
	Pts: Tomas Dimša 18; Rebs: Okoye 7 Asts: Albicy 5 PIR: Beirán 20	Boxscore	Pts: Kalinić 17; Rebs: Dubljević, Kalinić 5 Asts: Dubljević 5 PIR: Kalinić 24	Arena: Gran Canaria Arena; Attendance: 0 Referees: Miguel Ángel Pérez, Alberto Sánchez, Fabio Fernández

22 May 2021 38	Valencia Basket	96–76	Urbas Fuenlabrada	Valencia
18:00	Scoring by quarter: 24–23, 27–17, 12–24, 33–12
	Pts: Dubljević 21; Rebs: Kalinić, Sastre 5 Asts: Dubljević 8 PIR: Dubljević 30	Boxscore	Pts: Diallo 18; Rebs: Diallo 9 Asts: Trimble 6 PIR: Diallo 28	Arena: La Fonteta; Referees: Óscar Perea, Jorge Martínez, Iyán González

==== ACB Playoffs ====
Win Loss

===== Quarterfinals =====
31 May 2021 1	Valencia Basket	87–86	TD Systems Baskonia	Valencia
19:45	Scoring by quarter: 22–18, 13–26, 25–19, 27–23
	Pts: Dubljević 20; Rebs: Kalinić 7 Asts: Van Rossom 7 PIR: Kalinić 24	Boxscore	Pts: Peters 16; Rebs: Polonara 7 Asts: Colom, Henry 3 PIR: Henry 18	Arena: La Fonteta; Attendance: 0 Referees: Daniel Hierrezuelo, Juan de Dios Oyón, Joaquín García

2 June 2021 2	TD Systems Baskonia	76–65	Valencia Basket	Vitoria-Gasteiz
19:45	Scoring by quarter: 26–16, 15–12, 21–18, 14–19
	Pts: Giedraitis 15; Rebs: Giedraitis 7 Asts: Henry 10; PIR: Giedraitis 24	Boxscore	Pts: Prepelič 20; Rebs: Dubljević 9 Asts: Van Rossom 3 PIR: Prepelič 15	Arena: Buesa Arena; Attendance: 0 Referees: Emilio Pérez, Arnau Padrós, Javier Torres

4 June 2021 3	Valencia Basket	78–73	TD Systems Baskonia	Valencia
19:45	Scoring by quarter: 23–19, 20–15, 16–19, 19–20
	Pts: Kalinić 18; Rebs: Kalinić 7 Asts: Van Rossom 6 PIR: Kalinić 29	Boxscore	Pts: Dragić 16; Rebs: Jekiri 6 Asts: Henry 8 PIR: Polonara 20	Arena: La Fonteta; Attendance: 0 Referees: Miguel Ángel Pérez, Carlos Peruga, Alberto Sánchez

===== Semifinals =====
6 June 2021	Real Madrid	81–70	Valencia Basket	Madrid
18:30	Scoring by quarter: 25–14, 19–24, 14–8, 23–24
	Pts: Causeur 24; Rebs: Garuba 12; Asts: Alocén 8 PIR: Tavares 27	Boxscore	Pts: Hermannsson, Labeyrie 11; Rebs: Dubljević 12; Asts: Kalinić 4 PIR: Dubljević 16	Arena: WiZink Center; Attendance: 1,000; Referees: Emilio Pérez, Jordi Aliaga, Luis Miguel Castillo

8 June 2021	Valencia Basket	85–67	Real Madrid	Valencia
21:15	Scoring by quarter: 24–18, 20–11, 20–19, 21–19
	Pts: Labeyrie 18; Rebs: Dubljević 7 Asts: Hermannsson 5 PIR: Labeyrie 22	Boxscore	Pts: Carroll 13; Rebs: Tyus 6 Asts: Alocén, Taylor 3 PIR: Tyus 12	Arena: La Fonteta; Attendance: 1,000; Referees: Carlos Peruga, Óscar Perea, Alberto Sánchez

10 June 2021	Real Madrid	80–77	Valencia Basket	Madrid
22:00	Scoring by quarter: 22–18, 20–21, 17–16, 21–22
	Pts: Garuba 16; Rebs: Garuba 14; Asts: Llull 5 PIR: Garuba 23	Boxscore	Pts: Kalinić 13; Rebs: Labeyrie 5 Asts: Van Rossom 3 PIR: Tobey, Kalinić 14	Arena: WiZink Center; Attendance: 1,000; Referees: Antonio Conde, Carlos Peruga, Jordi Aliaga

=== EuroLeague ===
==== League table ====
Pos	Team	Pld	W	L	PF	PA	PD	Qualification
7	(Turkey) Fenerbahçe Beko	34	20	14	2661	2679	−18	Qualification to playoffs
8	(Russia) Zenit Saint Petersburg	34	20	14	2670	2547	+123	Qualification to playoffs
9	(Spain) Valencia Basket	34	19	15	2762	2743	+19	
10	(Spain) TD Systems Baskonia	34	18	16	2742	2619	+123	
11	(Lithuania) Žalgiris	34	17	17	2630	2645	−15	

Source: EuroLeague
Rules for classification: All points scored in extra period(s) will not be counted in the standings, nor for any tie-break situation.

==== Results summary ====
Overall						Home					Away				
Pld	W	L	PF	PA	PD	W	L	PF	PA	PD	W	L	PF	PA	PD
34	19	15	2783	2762	+21	12	5	1399	1347	+52	7	10	1384	1415	−31

Source: Competitive matches

==== Results by round ====
Round	1	2	3	4	5	6	7	8	9	10	11	12	13	14	15	16	17	18	19	20	21	22	23	24	25	26	27	28	29	30	31	32	33	34
Ground	H	A	H	H	A	A	H	A	H	H	A	H	H	A	A	H	A	A	A	H	A	H	A	H	H	A	A	A	H	A	H	H	A	H
Result	W	W	L	L	W	L	W	L	W	W	W	L	W	W	L	W	L	L	L	W	L	L	L	W	W	W	L	L	W	W	W	L	W	W
Position	7	2	6	8	4	5	4	6	5	4	3	8	5	5	6	5	7	8	10	9	9	10	11	10	10	9	11	11	10	10	10	10	10	9

Source: Competitive matches
A = Away; H = Home; W = Win; L = Loss

==== Matches ====
1 October 2020 1	Valencia Basket (Spain)	65–63	(France) LDLC ASVEL	Valencia
21:00	Scoring by quarter: 18–17, 19–16, 13–14, 15–16
	Pts: Williams 15; Rebs: Dubljević, Williams 5 Asts: Kalinić, Prepelič 3 PIR: Williams 18	Boxscore	Pts: Fall 14; Rebs: Noua 8 Asts: Cole 6 PIR: Fall 18	Arena: La Fonteta; Attendance: 400; Referees: Sasa Pukl, Fernando Rocha, Elias Koromilas

8 October 2020 2	Real Madrid (Spain)	77–93	(Spain) Valencia Basket	Madrid
21:00	Scoring by quarter: 19–17, 20–27, 14–24, 24–25
	Pts: Tavares 15; Rebs: Deck, Tavares 7 Asts: Abalde, Llull 4 PIR: Tavares 24	Boxscore	Pts: Dubljević 24; Rebs: Kalinić 8 Asts: Hermannsson, Van Rossom 4 PIR: Dubljević 23	Arena: WiZink Center; Attendance: 0 Referees: Damir Javor, Piotr Pastusiak, Sébastien Clivaz

13 October 2020 3	Valencia Basket (Spain)	66–71	(Spain) Barcelona	Valencia
21:00	Scoring by quarter: 19–16, 16–17, 9–21, 22–17
	Pts: Dubljević, Kalinić 13; Rebs: Dubljević, Labeyrie 8 Asts: Prepelič 5 PIR: Dubljević 20	Boxscore	Pts: Šmits 15; Rebs: Šmits 7 Asts: Hanga 6 PIR: Šmits 23	Arena: La Fonteta; Attendance: 400; Referees: Christos Christodoulou, Mario Majkić, Jurgis Laurinavičius

22 October 2020 5	Žalgiris (Lithuania)	82–94	(Spain) Valencia Basket	Kaunas
19:00	Scoring by quarter: 27–22, 18–15, 12–30, 25–27
	Pts: Rubit, Grigonis 12; Rebs: Hayes 6 Asts: Lekavičius 5 PIR: Lekavičius 21	Boxscore	Pts: Marinković, Dubljević 16; Rebs: Tobey 6 Asts: Van Rossom 8 PIR: Dubljević 21	Arena: Žalgirio Arena; Attendance: 5,131; Referees: Robert Lottermoser, Rain Peerandi, Sinan İşgüder

29 October 2020 6	CSKA Moscow (Russia)	84–75	(Spain) Valencia Basket	Moscow
18:00	Scoring by quarter: 17–16, 27–19, 18–23, 22–17
	Pts: James 17; Rebs: Milutinov 8 Asts: James 5 PIR: James 19	Boxscore	Pts: Kalinić 15; Rebs: Williams 6 Asts: Van Rossom 5 PIR: Labeyrie 17	Arena: Megasport Arena; Attendance: 3,125; Referees: Oļegs Latiševs, Emin Moğulkoç, Spiros Gkontas

6 November 2020 7	Valencia Basket (Spain)	86–81	(Italy) A|X Armani Exchange Milan	Valencia
21:00	Scoring by quarter: 24–18, 18–26, 24–17, 20–20
	Pts: Van Rossom 21; Rebs: Dubljević 7 Asts: Prepelič 5 PIR: Van Rossom 19	Boxscore	Pts: Shields 17; Rebs: Hines 7 Asts: Rodríguez 4 PIR: LeDay 20	Arena: La Fonteta; Attendance: 400; Referees: Christos Christodoulou, Damir Javor, Robert Lottermoser

13 November 2020 8	Bayern Munich (Germany)	90–79	(Spain) Valencia Basket	Munich
20:30	Scoring by quarter: 21–18, 16–21, 25–21, 28–19
	Pts: Lučić 22; Rebs: Johnson 8 Asts: Šiško 5 PIR: Lučić 35	Boxscore	Pts: Prepelič 18; Rebs: Dubljević 6 Asts: Prepelič, Vives 5 PIR: Prepelič 18	Arena: Audi Dome; Attendance: 0 Referees: Saša Pukl, Elias Koromilas, Hugues Thépénier

17 November 2020 9	Valencia Basket (Spain)	95–83	(Greece) Panathinaikos OPAP	Valencia
21:00	Scoring by quarter: 22–21, 23–20, 25–25, 25–17
	Pts: Prepelič 18; Rebs: Labeyrie 4 Asts: Dubljević, Prepelič 6 PIR: Prepelič 26	Boxscore	Pts: Mack 15; Rebs: Papapetrou 9 Asts: three players 4 PIR: Papapetrou 20	Arena: La Fonteta; Attendance: 0 Referees: Fernando Rocha, Tomislav Hordov, Robert Vyklický

20 November 2020 10	Valencia Basket (Spain)	82–80	(Israel) Maccabi Tel Aviv	Valencia
21:00	Scoring by quarter: 19–17, 24–20, 15–22, 24–21
	Pts: Prepelič 22; Rebs: Williams 6 Asts: Dubljević 7 PIR: Prepelič 24	Boxscore	Pts: Wilbekin 25; Rebs: Bender, Caloiaro 7 Asts: Wilbekin 5 PIR: Wilbekin 24	Arena: La Fonteta; Attendance: 0 Referees: Milivoje Jovčić, Carmelo Paternicò, Tomasz Trawicki

27 November 2020 11	Fenerbahçe Beko (Turkey)	86–90	(Spain) Valencia Basket	Istanbul
18:45	Scoring by quarter: 17–16, 26–17, 21–26, 22–31
	Pts: Pierre 18; Rebs: Barthel 6 Asts: Brown, Muhammed 5 PIR: Pierre 25	Boxscore	Pts: Van Rossom 20; Rebs: Dubljević 8 Asts: Van Rossom 5 PIR: Van Rossom 24	Arena: Ülker Sports and Event Hall; Attendance: 0 Referees: Saša Pukl, Elias Koromilas, Piotr Pastusiak

3 December 2020 12	Valencia Basket (Spain)	92–100	(Germany) ALBA Berlin	Valencia
21:00	Scoring by quarter: 21–27, 29–24, 15–32, 27–17
	Pts: Hermannsson, Prepelič 13; Rebs: Pradilla 7 Asts: Hermannsson 6 PIR: Hermannsson 18	Boxscore	Pts: Granger 17; Rebs: Sikma 12; Asts: Siva 10; PIR: Sikma 24	Arena: La Fonteta; Attendance: 0 Referees: Luigi Lamonica, Damir Javor, Igor Dragojević

8 December 2020 4	Valencia Basket (Spain)	72–85	(Russia) Zenit Saint Petersburg	Valencia
21:00	Scoring by quarter: 12–16, 27–17, 21–32, 12–20
	Pts: Dubljević 18; Rebs: Kalinić 8 Asts: Kalinić 4 PIR: Dubljević 18	Boxscore	Pts: Hollins 20; Rebs: Rivers 8 Asts: Pangos 12; PIR: Pangos 24	Arena: La Fonteta; Attendance: 0 Referees: Sreten Radović, Spiros Gkontas, Eduard Udyanskyy

10 December 2020 13	Valencia Basket (Spain)	76–74	(Turkey) Anadolu Efes	Valencia
21:00	Scoring by quarter: 19–23, 21–15, 14–22, 22–14
	Pts: Tobey 21; Rebs: Dubljević 9 Asts: Hermannsson 7 PIR: Tobey 27	Boxscore	Pts: Anderson, Micić 16; Rebs: Singleton 5 Asts: Larkin 6 PIR: Singleton 23	Arena: La Fonteta; Attendance: 0 Referees: Christos Christodoulou, Tomislav Hordov, Anne Panther

16 December 2020 14	Olympiacos (Greece)	85–96	(Spain) Valencia Basket	Piraeus
20:30	Scoring by quarter: 16–25, 23–27, 26–24, 20–20
	Pts: Sloukas 18; Rebs: Jean-Charles, Vezenkov 7 Asts: Sloukas 7 PIR: Jean-Charles, Vezenkov 22	Boxscore	Pts: Dubljević 20; Rebs: Dubljević 9 Asts: Prepelič 4 PIR: Dubljević 29	Arena: Peace and Friendship Stadium; Attendance: 0 Referees: Matej Boltauzer, Michele Rossi, Robert Vyklický

18 December 2020 15	Crvena zvezda mts (Serbia)	76–73	(Spain) Valencia Basket	Belgrade
19:00	Scoring by quarter: 20–22, 25–14, 12–21, 19–16
	Pts: Loyd 20; Rebs: Davidovac, Kuzmić 5 Asts: Loyd 6 PIR: Loyd, O'Bryant 18	Boxscore	Pts: Labeyrie, Prepelič 15; Rebs: Labeyrie 6 Asts: Hermannsson 5 PIR: Labeyrie 23	Arena: Aleksandar Nikolić Hall; Attendance: 0 Referees: Luigi Lamonica, Marcin Kowalski, Amit Balak

23 December 2020 16	Valencia Basket (Spain)	88–82	(Russia) Khimki	Valencia
21:00	Scoring by quarter: 16–13, 29–16, 14–23, 29–30
	Pts: Hermannsson 16; Rebs: Tobey 8 Asts: Hermannsson 9 PIR: Hermannsson 22	Boxscore	Pts: McCollum 16; Rebs: Jerebko, Timma 5 Asts: four players 3 PIR: McCollum 20	Arena: La Fonteta; Attendance: 0 Referees: Saša Pukl, Milivoje Jovčić, Elias Koromilas

29 December 2020 17	TD Systems Baskonia (Spain)	71–70	(Spain) Valencia Basket	Vitoria-Gasteiz
21:00	Scoring by quarter: 17–30, 22–17, 16–11, 16–12
	Pts: Polonara 18; Rebs: Jekiri 8 Asts: Henry 6 PIR: Polonara 26	Boxscore	Pts: Kalinić 16; Rebs: Dubljević 8 Asts: Prepelič, Van Rossom 4 PIR: Kalinić 20	Arena: Buesa Arena; Attendance: 0 Referees: Robert Lottermoser, Emin Moğulkoç, Sébastien Clivaz

7 January 2021 18	Barcelona (Spain)	89–72	(Spain) Valencia Basket	Barcelona
21:00	Scoring by quarter: 18–12, 20–21, 29–21, 22–18
	Pts: Abrines 16; Rebs: Martínez 8 Asts: Calathes 7 PIR: Abrines 18	Boxscore	Pts: Labeyrie 17; Rebs: Tobey 10; Asts: three players 3 PIR: Tobey 22	Arena: Palau Blaugrana; Attendance: 0 Referees: Carmelo Paternicò, Sérgio Silva, Uroš Nikolić

12 January 2021 19	A|X Armani Exchange Milan (Italy)	95–80	(Spain) Valencia Basket	Milan
20:45	Scoring by quarter: 21–20, 33–16, 22–24, 19–20
	Pts: Datome 27; Rebs: Datome 6 Asts: Moraschini, Roll 4 PIR: Datome 26	Boxscore	Pts: Williams 17; Rebs: Labeyrie 7 Asts: Vives 5 PIR: Williams 22	Arena: Mediolanum Forum; Attendance: 0 Referees: Matej Boltauzer, Gytis Vilius, Artūras Šukys

15 January 2021 20	Valencia Basket (Spain)	91–71	(Serbia) Crvena zvezda mts	Valencia
21:00	Scoring by quarter: 27–15, 22–27, 19–15, 23–14
	Pts: Labeyrie 16; Rebs: Tobey 5 Asts: Kalinić 7 PIR: Van Rossom 21	Boxscore	Pts: O'Bryant 21; Rebs: Jagodić-Kuridža 6 Asts: Hall 4 PIR: Jagodić-Kuridža 14	Arena: La Fonteta; Attendance: 0 Referees: Borys Ryzhyk, Elias Koromilas, Aare Halliko

21 January 2021 21	LDLC ASVEL (France)	90–77	(Spain) Valencia Basket	Villeurbanne
20:45	Scoring by quarter: 17–17, 23–17, 21–20, 29–23
	Pts: Howard 17; Rebs: three players 4 Asts: Cole, Diot 6 PIR: Howard 24	Boxscore	Pts: Kalinić 18; Rebs: Tobey 9 Asts: Hermannsson 7 PIR: Kalinić 19	Arena: Astroballe; Attendance: 0 Referees: Luigi Lamonica, Emin Moğulkoç, Milan Nedović

27 January 2021 22	Valencia Basket (Spain)	78–79	(Lithuania) Žalgiris	Valencia
21:00	Scoring by quarter: 20–20, 18–27, 17–13, 23–19
	Pts: Prepelič 18; Rebs: Tobey 9 Asts: Van Rossom 4 PIR: Prepelič 20	Boxscore	Pts: Rubit 17; Rebs: Lauvergne 12; Asts: Jokubaitis 6 PIR: Rubit 17	Arena: La Fonteta; Attendance: 0 Referees: Fernando Rocha, Sašo Petek, Spiros Gkontas

29 January 2021 23	Panathinaikos OPAP (Greece)	91–72	(Spain) Valencia Basket	Athens
20:00	Scoring by quarter: 22–20, 26–14, 20–18, 23–20
	Pts: Nedović 16; Rebs: Papagiannis 9 Asts: Nedović 7 PIR: Bochoridis 19	Boxscore	Pts: Prepelič 20; Rebs: Dubljević, Tobey 5 Asts: Hermannsson, Van Rossom 5 PIR: Prepelič 21	Arena: O.A.K.A. Attendance: 0 Referees: Oļegs Latiševs, Piotr Pastusiak, Anne Panther

4 February 2021 24	Valencia Basket (Spain)	105–103(OT)	(Russia) CSKA Moscow	Valencia
21:00	Scoring by quarter: 25–17, 22–26, 17–20, 20–21, Overtime: 11–11, 10–8
	Pts: Kalinić, Prepelič 22; Rebs: Dubljević 12; Asts: Prepelič 6 PIR: Kalinić, Prepelič 23	Boxscore	Pts: James 37; Rebs: Voigtmann 9 Asts: James 7 PIR: James 31	Arena: La Fonteta; Attendance: 0 Referees: Sasa Pukl, Jakub Zamojski, Josip Radojković

19 February 2021 25	Valencia Basket (Spain)	89–78	(Spain) Real Madrid	Valencia
21:00	Scoring by quarter: 29–21, 26–14, 16–17, 18–26
	Pts: Van Rossom 16; Rebs: Labeyrie 8 Asts: Van Rossom 8 PIR: Van Rossom 20	Boxscore	Pts: Carroll 20; Rebs: Tavares, Thompkins 9 Asts: Alocén, Tavares 3 PIR: Tavares 19	Arena: La Fonteta; Attendance: 0 Referees: Luigi Lamonica, Miloš Koljenšić, Marko Juras

25 February 2021 26	Zenit Saint Petersburg (Russia)	62–91	(Spain) Valencia Basket	Saint Petersburg
18:00	Scoring by quarter: 19–22, 22–22, 9–18, 12–29
	Pts: Poythress 12; Rebs: Hollins 5 Asts: Ponitka, Zakharov 3 PIR: Poythress 14	Boxscore	Pts: Dubljević 19; Rebs: Dubljević 6 Asts: Kalinić 10; PIR: Kalinić 25	Arena: Sibur Arena; Attendance: 2276; Referees: Sreten Radović, Emin Moğulkoç, Gentian Cici

2 March 2021 27	Anadolu Efes (Turkey)	99–83	(Spain) Valencia Basket	Istanbul
18:30	Scoring by quarter: 18–23, 28–17, 22–18, 31–25
	Pts: Şanlı 20; Rebs: Moerman 8 Asts: Larkin 6 PIR: Şanlı 26	Boxscore	Pts: Dubljević 15; Rebs: Kalinić 9 Asts: Van Rossom 4 PIR: Dubljević 19	Arena: Sinan Erdem Dome; Attendance: 0 Referees: Mehdi Difallah, Carmelo Paternicò, Tomislav Hordov

4 March 2021 28	Maccabi Tel Aviv (Israel)	84–72	(Spain) Valencia Basket	Tel Aviv
20:05	Scoring by quarter: 14–18, 19–17, 29–21, 22–16
	Pts: Dorsey 17; Rebs: Žižić 6 Asts: Caloiaro, Wilbekin 4 PIR: Dorsey 24	Boxscore	Pts: Labeyrie 18; Rebs: Dubljević 9 Asts: Dubljević, Hermannsson 4 PIR: Labeyrie 21	Arena: Menora Mivtachim Arena; Attendance: 300; Referees: Milivoje Jovčić, Fernando Rocha, Hugues Thépénier

12 March 2021 29	Valencia Basket (Spain)	66–52	(Turkey) Fenerbahçe Beko	Valencia
21:00	Scoring by quarter: 18–10, 19–18, 8–11, 21–13
	Pts: Van Rossom 17; Rebs: Dubljević 7 Asts: Kalinić 5 PIR: Van Rossom 26	Boxscore	Pts: Veselý 15; Rebs: De Colo 6 Asts: Brown, De Colo 4 PIR: Veselý 19	Arena: La Fonteta; Attendance: 0 Referees: Luigi Lamonica, Elias Koromilas, Gytis Vilius

19 March 2021 30	Khimki (Russia)	68–77	(Spain) Valencia Basket	Khimki
18:00	Scoring by quarter: 17–27, 21–17, 11–14, 19–19
	Pts: Mickey 20; Rebs: Monia 8 Asts: McCollum 5 PIR: Mickey 19	Boxscore	Pts: Williams 18; Rebs: Tobey 9 Asts: Hermannsson 8 PIR: Tobey 19	Arena: Mytishchi Arena; Attendance: 1314; Referees: Sasa Pukl, Uroš Obrknežević, Kristaps Konstantinovs

25 March 2021 31	Valencia Basket (Spain)	83–76	(Germany) Bayern Munich	Valencia
21:00	Scoring by quarter: 26–19, 20–14, 12–30, 25–13
	Pts: Tobey 18; Rebs: Williams 7 Asts: Van Rossom 9 PIR: Tobey 22	Boxscore	Pts: Lučić 20; Rebs: Lučić 7 Asts: Weiler-Babb 5 PIR: Lučić 24	Arena: La Fonteta; Attendance: 0 Referees: Borys Ryzhyk, Mario Majkić, Artūras Šukys

31 March 2021 32	Valencia Basket (Spain)	79–88	(Greece) Olympiacos	Valencia
21:00	Scoring by quarter: 19–23, 12–21, 10–30, 38–14
	Pts: Prepelič 12; Rebs: Tobey 9 Asts: Kalinić, Vives 4 PIR: San Emeterio 15	Boxscore	Pts: Vezenkov 19; Rebs: Printezis, Vezenkov 6 Asts: Sloukas 11; PIR: Printezis 23	Arena: La Fonteta; Attendance: 0 Referees: Oļegs Latiševs, Jakub Zamojski, Robert Vyklický

2 April 2021 33	ALBA Berlin (Germany)	86–90	(Spain) Valencia Basket	Berlin
20:00	Scoring by quarter: 26–13, 27–29, 17–22, 16–26
	Pts: Eriksson 17; Rebs: Sikma 9 Asts: Siva 9 PIR: Eriksson 20	Boxscore	Pts: Prepelič 24; Rebs: Dubljević 8 Asts: Prepelič 7 PIR: Prepelič 29	Arena: Mercedes-Benz Arena; Attendance: 0 Referees: Emin Moğulkoç, Amit Balak, Jurgis Laurinavičius

8 April 2021 34	Valencia Basket (Spain)	86–81	(Spain) TD Systems Baskonia	Valencia
21:00	Scoring by quarter: 25–21, 14–23, 21–15, 26–22
	Pts: Williams 16; Rebs: Dubljević, Tobey 7 Asts: Prepelič, Williams 4 PIR: Williams 25	Boxscore	Pts: Henry 19; Rebs: Sedekerskis 7 Asts: Henry 7 PIR: Henry 22	Arena: La Fonteta; Attendance: 0 Referees: Saša Pukl, Sreten Radović, Joseph Bissang

=== Copa del Rey ===
==== Quarterfinals ====
11 February 2021	Real Madrid	85–74	Valencia Basket	Madrid
21:30	Scoring by quarter: 29–17, 20–17, 14–21, 22–19
	Pts: Deck, Thompkins 23; Rebs: Deck 6 Asts: Alocén 7 PIR: Deck, Thompkins 22	Boxscore	Pts: Van Rossom 16; Rebs: Labeyrie 7 Asts: Kalinić, Van Rossom 3 PIR: Kalinić, Van Rossom 18	Arena: WiZink Center; Attendance: 0 Referees: Daniel Hierrezuelo, Jordi Aliaga, Luis Miguel Castillo
