= Cvetinović =

Cvetinović (Serbian Cyrillic: Цветиновић) is a Serbian surname. Notable people with the surname include:

- Dušan Cvetinović (born 1988), Serbian footballer
- Nikola Cvetinović (born 1988), Serbian basketball player
