= Radosav Spasojević =

Montenegrin basketball player

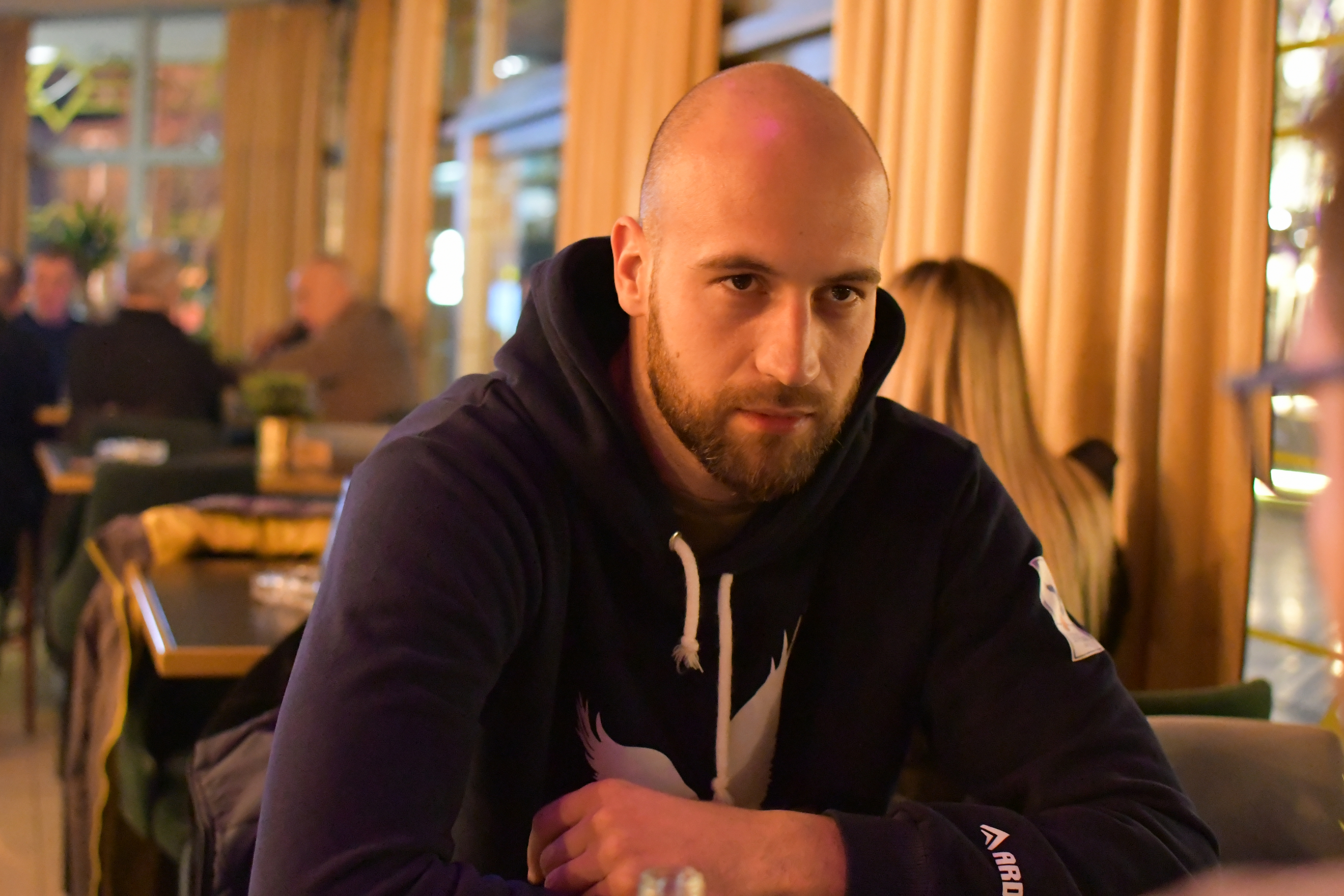

Botev Academic
- Position: Power forward
- League: NBL

Personal information
- Born: 28 February 1992 (age 34) Nikšić, SR Montenegro, SFR Yugoslavia
- Listed height: 2.04 m (6 ft 8 in)

Career information
- NBA draft: 2014: undrafted
- Playing career: 2010–present

Career history
- 2010–2014: Traiskirchen Lions
- 2014: Oviedo
- 2014–2016: Sutjeska
- 2016–2017: Mega Leks
- 2017–2018: MZT Skopje
- 2018–2019: Sutjeska
- 2019–2020: Steaua București
- 2020–2022: Sutjeska
- 2022–2025: Krka
- 2025–2026: Mladost Zemun
- 2026–present: Botev Academic

Career highlights
- Macedonian Cup winner (2018)

Radosav Spasojević (born 28 February 1992) is a Montenegrin professional basketball player for Botev Academic of the Bulgarian National Basketball League (NBL). In his career, he has also played for Traiskirchen Lions, Oviedo, Sutjeska, Mega Leks, MZT Skopje, and Krka.
