= Joey van Zegeren =

Dutch basketball player

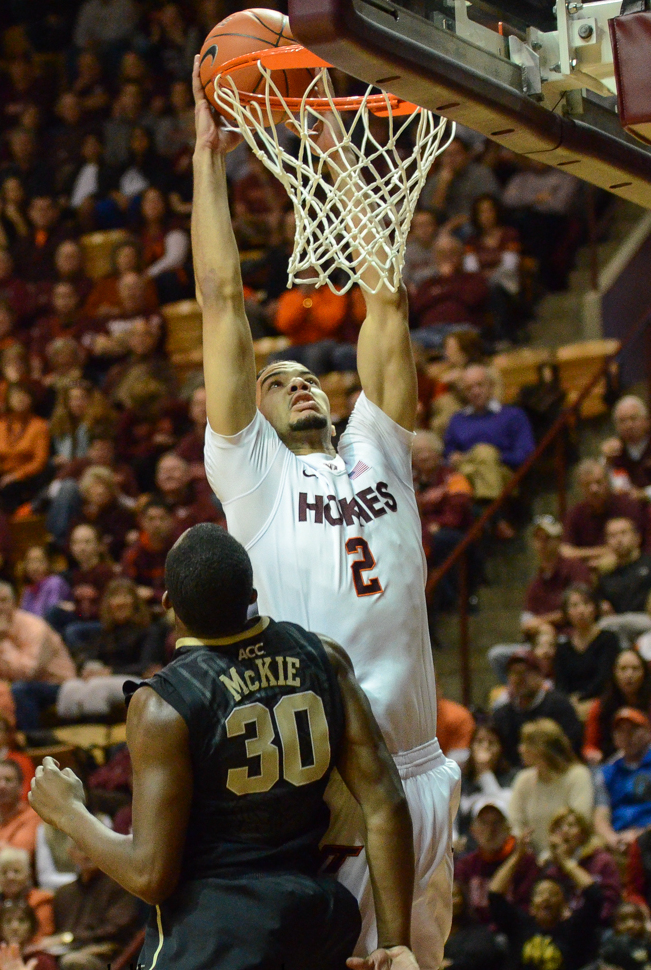
- Van Zegeren dunnks playing for Virginia Tech in 2013

No. 21 – CB Zamora
- Position: Center
- League: Primera FEB

Personal information
- Born: 7 December 1990 (age 35) Gweru, Zimbabwe
- Listed height: 2.08 m (6 ft 10 in)
- Listed weight: 105 kg (231 lb)

Career information
- College: Virginia Tech (2011–2015); Northwestern (2015–2016)
- NBA draft: 2016: undrafted
- Playing career: 2009–present

Career history
- 2009–2010: Rotterdam
- 2016–2017: Gladiators Trier
- 2017–2018: Leuven Bears
- 2018–2019: Oviedo CB
- 2019–2020: AB Castelló
- 2020–2021: Real Valladolid
- 2021–2022: Alicante
- 2022–2023: Burgos
- 2023–2024: Fuenlabrada
- 2025–present: Zamora

Johan Willem van Zegeren (born 7 December 1990) is a Dutch basketball player for CB Zamora of the Primera FEB and the Netherlands national basketball team.

== Early career ==
Born in Gweru, Zimbabwe, he moved to the Netherlands when he was 8 and grew up in Hoogeveen, Drenthe. After playing in the youth program of Rotterdam Basketbal and made his debut for the first team in the Dutch Basketball League in the 2009–10 season, playing 9 games. He later moved to Spain to play in the Canarias Basketball Academy program.

== College career ==
Van Zegeren played four seasons with Virginia Tech. As a redshirt junior, he averaged 9.8 points and 5.3 rebounds per game, but was dismissed from the team in January 2015. For his final season of eligibility, van Zegeren transferred to Northwestern. He averaged 3.6 points and 3.0 rebounds per game, suffering a season-ending knee injury in March 2015.

== Professional career ==
He spent the 2018–19 season with Oviedo CB, averaging 7.2 points and 5.2 rebounds per game. On June 15, 2019, van Zegeren signed with AB Castelló. In July 2020, van Zegeren signed with Real Valladolid.

On August 9, 2022, he signed with San Pablo Burgos of the LEB Oro.

On August 12, 2025, he signed with Zamora of the Primera FEB.

== National team career ==
In January 2020, he was selected for the Netherlands national basketball team for the first time.
