= Oviedo CB =

- Leagues: Primera FEB
- Founded: 2004
- Arena: Palacio de los Deportes de Oviedo (Capacity: 5,340)
- Location: Oviedo, Spain
- Team colors: Navy, white and orange
- President: Fernando Villabella
- Head coach: Javi Rodriguez
- Championships: 1 Copa Princesa de Asturias; 1 LEB Plata championship 1 Liga EBA championship
- Website: oviedobaloncesto.com
Home	Away

Oviedo Club Baloncesto, also known as Alimerka Oviedo Baloncesto for sponsorship reasons, is a professional basketball team based in Oviedo, Asturias, that plays in the Spanish Primera FEB.

== History ==
=== First years ===
First Oviedo CB logo

Oviedo CB was founded in 2004 in place of the old CB Vetusta—today dissolved. In their first season, 2004–05, the club started at Liga EBA but was relegated to Primera División after winning only six games out of 30. The club returned to the Liga EBA next season after achieving a 27–0 record.

In the 2006–07 season, Ovideo was champion of Group A of the Liga EBA but was eliminated by Ciudad Torrealta Molina in round 16 of the LEB Plata promotion playoffs. In the next season, Oviedo finished again as champion of Group A and was promoted to the newly created LEB Bronce league.

In its first season in a professional league (2008–09), Oviedo finished in 14th position and avoided relegation to the Liga EBA. However, after the elimination of the LEB Bronce, the club board decided not to advance to the LEB Plata due to insufficient funds—instead opting to continue playing in the EBA.

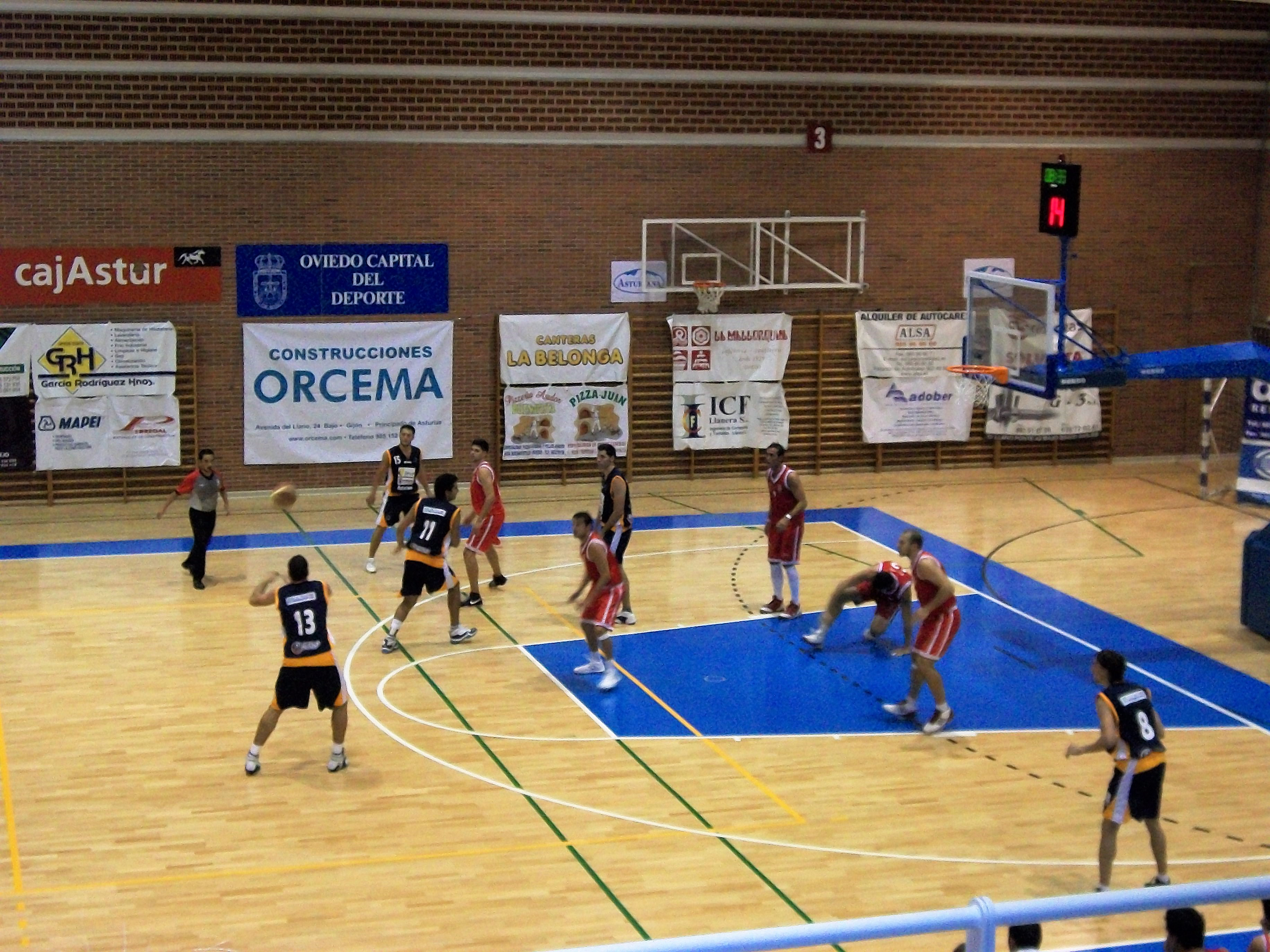
Match against Ferrol CB in the 2009–10 Liga EBA season.

During its 2009–10 season at Liga EBA, Oviedo CB clinched the third title of Group A. After beating Atarfe, CB Vic and Real Canoe NC in the promotion playoffs, it advanced to the LEB Plata. Following this season, the club was considered the best one of the Liga EBA, with only two defeats in the regular season and a 3–3 balance in the playoffs.

=== Playing in LEB Plata ===
After promoting, the club needed to find funding to play the 2010–2011 LEB Plata season, ultimately doing so. FEVE Oviedo qualified for the promotion playoffs after finishing in the eight position of the regular season. Promobys Tíjola defeated Oviedo in the quarterfinals by 3–1.

On 1 February 2013, the team played in the Copa LEB Plata but was defeated 71–78 by CEBA Guadalajara. After this loss, the team was promoted to LEB Oro after becoming champion of the 2012–13 LEB Plata with a win at Gran Canaria B by 59–89 on 9 March 2013.

=== 2013–present: growing in LEB Oro ===
After its promotion to LEB Oro, Oviedo CB started playing in the second division of Spanish basketball. The team's performance was a surprise, and it was one of the top teams in the league thanks to a strong performance at Pumarín, where it remained unbeaten for 15 months until Ford Burgos won at Pumarín by 17 points.

In its first season in LEB Oro, Unión Financiera Oviedo Baloncesto (its sponsorship naming) qualified for the promotion playoffs to Liga ACB and defeated Leyma Natura Básquet Coruña in the quarterfinals by 2–0. It was ultimately eliminated by Quesos Cerrato Palencia by 1–3 in the semifinals.

On 20 December 2016, Oviedo CB led the LEB Oro league table for the first time in its history after beating away Araberri by 86–75. Ten days later, the club qualified for the Copa Princesa de Asturias for the first time, finishing at the top of the table after the first half of the 2016–17 league. Oviedo conquered the Cup on 27 January 2017, after beating San Pablo Inmobiliaria Burgos by 80–77 in the final.

== Sponsorship naming ==
Oviedo CB has received diverse sponsorship names along the years:

- Domo Residencial Oviedo: 2004–2005, 2006–2008
- Basemat OCB: 2005–2006
- FEVE Oviedo Baloncesto: 2008–2011
- Unión Financiera Asturiana Oviedo Baloncesto: 2012–2013
- Unión Financiera Baloncesto Oviedo: 2013–2018
- Liberbank Oviedo Baloncesto: 2018–2022
- Alimerka Oviedo Baloncesto: 2022–present

== Players ==
=== Current roster ===
Note: Flags indicate national team eligibility at FIBA-sanctioned events. Players may hold other non-FIBA nationalities not displayed.

Liberbank Oviedo Baloncesto roster
Players
Coaches

Pos.	No.	Nat.	Name	Ht.	Age
PG	0	(United States)	Smith Jr., Patrick	1.83 m (6 ft 0 in)	23 – 12 February 2003
CG	1	(United States) (Jamaica)	Williams, Zaire	1.93 m (6 ft 4 in)	22 – 24 December 2003
PG	2	(United States) (Cape Verde)	Goodine, Brycen	1.93 m (6 ft 4 in)	27 – 29 September 1999
SF	7	(Netherlands)	Hollanders, Sander	1.93 m (6 ft 4 in)	25 – 13 September 2001
PG	8	(Sweden)	Terins, Félix	1.88 m (6 ft 2 in)	28 – 24 May 1998
SF	13	(Montenegro)	Brnović, Danilo	2.03 m (6 ft 8 in)	26 – 10 August 2000
PF	14	(Ukraine)	Shelist, Daniil	2.03 m (6 ft 8 in)	23 – 30 August 2003
C	15	(United States)	Wisne, Brock	2.06 m (6 ft 9 in)	23 – 18 September 2003
C	24	(Senegal) (Spain)	Barro, Mouhamed	2.06 m (6 ft 9 in)	31 – 10 May 1995
C	34	(Mali)	Diarra, Djigui	2.08 m (6 ft 10 in)	22 – 9 July 2004
PF	35	(United States) (Nigeria)	Nwaokorie, Francis	2.01 m (6 ft 7 in)	24 – 24 September 2002
SF	48	(Spain)	Arias, Jorge	1.98 m (6 ft 6 in)	20 – 25 January 2006

Head coach

- (Spain) Javi Rodríguez Pérez

Legend

- (C) Team captain
- Injured

=== Depth chart ===
Pos.	Starting 5	Bench 1	Bench 2
C	Mouhamed Barro	Djigui Diarra	Brock Wisne
PF	Francis Nwaokorie	Daniil Shelist
SF	Danilo Brnović	Sander Hollanders	Jorge Arias
SG	Brycen Goodine	Zaire Williams
PG	Patrick Smith Jr.	Félix Terins

Colours: Blue = homegrown player; Red = non–FIBA Europe player

== Head coaches ==
- Miguel Moreno 2004
- Emilio García 2004–2005
- Iván Martín 2005–2008
- Mariano Arasa 2008–2009
- Alfredo Riera 2009–2012
- Guillermo Arenas 2012–2015, 2023
- Carles Marco 2015–2018
- Javi Rodríguez 2018–2020, 2023–present
- Natxo Lezkano 2020–2022
- Trifón Poch 2022–2023

== Season by season ==
Season	Tier	Division	Pos.	W–L	Cup competitions		Roster
2004–05	4	Liga EBA	15th	3–27			
2005–06	5	1ª División	1st	25–0			
2006–07	4	Liga EBA	1st	21–7			Álvarez, Arenas, Champi, A. Fernández, V. Fernández, García, García Cartón, Llorente, A. Macía, Héctor Macía, Martins, Moreta. Coach: Martín.
2007–08	5	Liga EBA	1st	27–6			Arenas, Candás, Champi, Díez, Fernández, García Cartón, Lazo, Machado, A. Macía, H. Macía, Parada, Prieto. Coach: Martín.
2008–09	4	LEB Bronce	14th (Note: After the dissolution of the LEB Bronce, the club resigned to play in LEB Plata.)	12–18			Candás, Champi, Diéguez, DiGennaro, Fernández, Ferro, Frutos, Kaunisto, Kraus, Macía, Neumann, Prieto, Robinson, Tate, Woodfork. Coach: Arasa.
2009–10	4	Liga EBA	1st	29–5			Camín, Candás, Champi, Fernández, González, A. Macía, H. Macía, Mathis, Menéndez, Parada, Prieto, Suárez, Tate. Coach: Riera.
2010–11	3	LEB Plata	8th	14–18			Fernández, González, James, A. Macía, H. Macía, O'Leary, Parada, Prieto, Ratzsch, Román, Suárez, Tate. Coach: Riera.
2011–12	3	LEB Plata	10th	8–16			Brown, Dagostino, Diarra, González, LeDuc, Lesmes, Lewis, A. Macía, H. Macía, Matemalas, Ortega, Peltier, Pérez, Prieto, Rodríguez, Suárez. Coach: Riera.
2012–13	3	LEB Plata	1st	15–5	Copa LEB Plata	RU	Atoyebi, Cárdenas, Cheick Condé, Galick, Hanley, Kinter, A. Macía, H. Macía, Marzo, Muñoz, Orán, Pámpano, Pérez, Prieto, Sánchez, Suárez. Coach: Arenas.
2013–14	2	LEB Oro	5th	17–15			Bassas, Cárdenas, Fitzgerald, García, Garrett, A. Macía, H. Macía, Muñoz, Pérez, Prieto, Sánchez, Spasojević, van Wijk. Coach: Arenas.
2014–15	2	LEB Oro	11th	11–17			Bassas, Carissimo, Creus, Cvetinović, García, Lasa, Levesque, Muñoz, Neighbour, Pérez, Prieto, Sánchez, Schreiber, Tresnak. Coach: Arenas.
2015–16	2	LEB Oro	6th	19–15			Bassas, Cabanas, Crosgile, Fernández, Hearst, Marín, Miso, Pérez, Prieto, Sánchez, Swing, Trist, van Wijk, Windler. Coach: Marco.
2016–17	2	LEB Oro	5th	26–16	Copa Princesa	C	Barro, dos Anjos, Hernández-Sonseca, Jesperson, Löfberg, Martínez, D. Pérez, V. Pérez, Rodríguez, Salvó, Sans, Santana, Windler. Coach: Marco.
2017–18	2	LEB Oro	6th	24–15			Arteaga, Barro, Belemene, Cárdenas, Carlson, Fernández, Geks, González, Karahodžić, Maynard, Meana, Novak, Pérez, Rinkūnas, Santana, Vrkić. Coach: Marco.
2018–19	2	LEB Oro	6th	22–15			Ahonen, Arteaga, Cárdenas, Douvier, Geks, Jakstas, Llorente, Meana, Nuutinen, Pérez, Puerto, Rosa, Spieth, van Zegeren. Coach: Rodríguez.
2019–20	2	LEB Oro	16th (Note: Season curtailed due to the COVID-19 pandemic.)	8–16			
2020–21	2	LEB Oro	6th	16–12			
2021–22	2	LEB Oro	6th	19–18			
2022–23	2	LEB Oro	14th	11–23			
2023–24	2	LEB Oro	13th	13–21			
2024–25	2	Primera FEB	10th	14–20	Spain Cup	QF	
2025–26	2	Primera FEB	5th	22–14	Spain Cup	R32	
2026–27	2	Primera FEB			Spain Cup	R32	

== Trophies and awards ==
=== Trophies ===
- Copa Princesa de Asturias: (1)
  - 2017
- LEB Plata: (1)
  - 2013
- Liga EBA: (1)
  - 2010

=== Individual awards ===
All LEB Oro Team

- Fran Cárdenas – 2014

Copa Princesa de Asturias MVP

- Miquel Salvó – 2017

LEB Plata MVP

- Ian O'Leary – 2011
- Will Hanley – 2013

== Individual records ==
Top performers of Oviedo CB, as of the end of the 2018–19 season. Not including games of the 2005–06 season, when Oviedo CB played in Primera División.

=== Most capped players ===
#	Player	Club career	Matches	Points
1	(Argentina) Agustín Prieto	2006–2016	258	1150
2	(Spain) Víctor Pérez	2012–	216	1922
3	(Spain) Héctor Macía	2006–2014	188	1933
3	(Spain) Adrián Macía	2005–2014	188	1430
5	(Spain) Albano Fernández	2004–2011	148	987
6	(Spain) Javi Candás	2006–2010	115	707
7	(Spain) Javi Rodríguez	2005–2010	110	1605
8	(Spain) Diego Sánchez	2012–2016	103	565
9	(Spain) Ferran Bassas	2013–2016	93	798
10	(Spain) Rubén Suárez	2009–2013	92	503

=== Top scorers ===
#	Player	Club career	Points	Matches	Average
1	(Spain) Héctor Macía	2006–2014	1933	188	10.3
2	(Spain) Víctor Pérez	2012–	1922	216	8.9
3	(Spain) Javi Rodríguez	2005–2010	1605	110	14.6
4	(Spain) Adrián Macía	2005–2014	1430	188	7.6
5	(Argentina) Agustín Prieto	2006–2016	1150	258	4.5
6	(Spain) Albano Fernández	2004–2011	987	148	6.7
7	(United States) Tony Tate	2008–2011	980	77	12.7
8	(Spain) Óliver Arteaga	2017–	868	67	13.0
9	(Spain) Ferran Bassas	2013–2016	798	93	8.6
10	(Spain) Javi Candás	2006–2010	707	115	6.1
