= Guillermo Arenas (basketball) =

German basketball head coach

Guillermo Arenas Milán
Alimerka Oviedo Baloncesto
- Title: Head coach
- League: LEB Oro

Personal information
- Born: December 20, 1977 (age 48) Oviedo, Asturias
- Position: Point Guard
- Coaching career: 2009–2015, 2016–present

Career history

Playing
- 2000–2001: Colegio École
- 2003–2004: Asociación Atlética Avilesina
- 2006–2009: Oviedo
- 2015–2016: Club Baloncesto Castrillón

Coaching
- 2009–2012: Universidad de Oviedo (women's) (assistant)
- 2009–2010: Oviedo (reserve team)
- 2010–2012: Oviedo (assistant)
- 2012–2015: Oviedo
- 2016–2017: Baloncesto Villa de Mieres 2012
- 2017–2020: Peñas Huesca
- 2021–2022: Círculo Gijón (assistant)
- 2022–2023: Club Ourense Baloncesto
- 2023–: Oviedo

Career highlights
- LEB Plata champion (2013)

Guillermo Arenas Milán is a Spanish basketball coach. Currently he is the Head Coach for Alimerka Oviedo Baloncesto (LEB Oro).

== Coaching career ==
He began his coaching stint with Unión Financiera Asturiana Oviedo Baloncesto back in 2011, serving as the assistant head coach for the team. After a year, in 2012, after spending his first season as assistant coach for the Unión Financiera Asturiana Oviedo Baloncesto, he was duly promoted to be the head coach of the team.

On 2017, he signed with the team, Levitec Huesca. But in May 2020, he left the said team.

On 2021, he signed with Círculo Gijón Baloncesto y Conocimiento to become an assistant coach.

== Head coaching record ==
Team	Year	G	W	L	W–L%	Result
Unión Financiera Baloncesto Oviedo	2012-13	20	15	5	.7500	
Unión Financiera Baloncesto Oviedo	2013-14	26	14	12	.5387	
Unión Financiera Baloncesto Oviedo	2014-15	28	11	17	.3929	
Levitec Huesca	2016-17	14	7	7	.5000	
Levitec Huesca	2017-18	34	13	21	.3824	
Levitec Huesca	2018-19	34	18	16	.5294	
Levitec Huesca	2019-20	24	9	15	.3750	
Career		206	97	109	.4709	
