= Viny Okouo =

Congolese basketball player (born 1997)

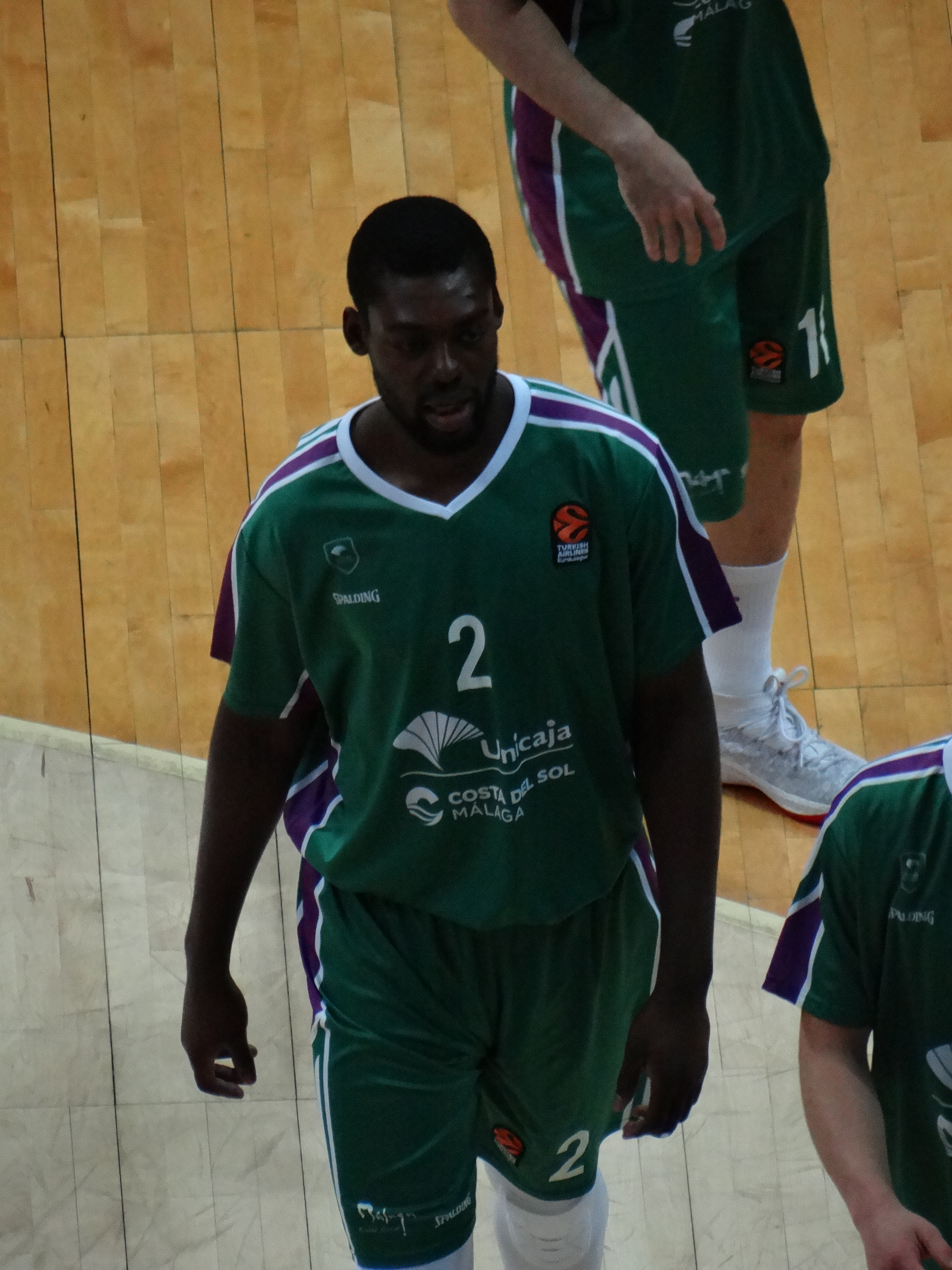
- Okouo with Unicaja in 2018

Zhangjiakou Sport Cultural Tourism
- Position: Center
- League: National Basketball League

Personal information
- Born: April 10, 1997 (age 29) Brazzaville, Republic of the Congo
- Listed height: 2.14 m (7 ft 0 in)
- Listed weight: 100 kg (220 lb)

Career information
- NBA draft: 2019: undrafted
- Playing career: 2015–present

Career history
- 2015–2019: Unicaja
- 2014–2016: →Clinicas Rincón Axarquía
- 2019–2020: Nevėžis Kėdainiai
- 2020–2021: Gipuzkoa
- 2021–2022: Monbus Obradoiro
- 2022–2023: Fuenlabrada
- 2023: Nevėžis Kėdainiai
- 2024: TAU Castelló
- 2024: Gaiteros del Zulia
- 2024–2025: TAU Castelló
- 2025: Cañeros del Este
- 2025: ASB New Generation
- 2026–present: Zhangjiakou Sport Cultural Tourism

Career highlights
- EuroCup champion (2017)

Viny Pierrot Marcel Okouo (born April 10, 1997) is a Congolese professional basketball player.

== Professional career ==
A native of the Republic of the Congo, Okouo started playing basketball when he was 15 years old and left home only shortly after to join the youth set-up of Unicaja Málaga in Spain. Okouo had been recommended by his fellow countryman Romaric Belemene. The Unicaja coaches had only seen some footage of Okouo practicing and were intrigued by his physical gifts, while his skills were underdeveloped. At Unicaja, he learned to play the game and improved vastly.

Between 2014 and 2016, he spent time on loan at Instituto de Fertilidad Clínicas Rincón of the LEB Plata, the third tier of Spanish basketball, while also seeing action for Unicaja’s development team in the EBA. Okouo made his ACB debut for Malaga during the 2015-16 campaign and saw his first minutes in the EuroCup the following season. In the 2016–17 season, Okouo won the EuroCup with Unicaja after beating Valencia Basket in the Finals.

On August 27, 2019, Okouo signed with Nevėžis Kėdainiai of the Lithuanian Basketball League.

Okouo entered into the NBA draft as early as 2017, but was recorded as an early 2018 draft entry. His name was entered into the 2019 NBA draft in which he was not selected.

On August 12, 2020, he signed with Gipuzkoa Basket of the Spanish Liga ACB.

On July 12, 2021, he signed with Monbus Obradoiro of the Spanish Liga ACB.

On August 13, 2022, Okouo signed with Fuenlabrada of the Liga ACB.

On August 15, 2023, Okouo returned to Nevėžis Kėdainiai.
