= Romaric Belemene =

Congolese basketball player

No. 35 – Baloncesto Fuenlabrada
- Position: Forward
- League: Primera FEB

Personal information
- Born: February 19, 1997 (age 29) Pointe-Noire, Republic of the Congo
- Listed height: 2.02 m (6 ft 8 in)
- Listed weight: 100 kg (220 lb)

Career history
- 2011–2018: Unicaja
- 2013–2016: →Clinicas Rincón
- 2016–2017: →Manresa
- 2017–2018: →Oviedo
- 2018–2019: Breogán
- 2019–2020: Legia Warszawa
- 2020–2021: Club Melilla Baloncesto
- 2021–2022: Cáceres Ciudad del Baloncesto
- 2022–2024: Real Valladolid
- 2024–2025: Grupo Alega Cantabria
- 2025–present: Fuenlabrada

Judicaël Romaric Belemene Dzabatou (born February 19, 1997, in Pointe-Noire) is a Congolese professional basketball player for Fuenlabrada of the Spanish Primera FEB.

== Career ==
Belemene hails from the Republic of the Congo. As a teenager, he attended the Serge Ibaka Camp and then joined the Spanish club Unicaja as a 14-year-old. He played in Unicaja’s youth set-up and in 2013 earned himself a spot on the roster of the club’s second men’s team. He made quite an impression his first year, averaging 9.3 points and 5.6 boards per contest in EBA play. Belemene also saw playing time at Clinicas Rincón in the LEB Oro, the second tier of basketball in Spain. In the course of the 2014-15 campaign, Belemene made his debut on Unicaja’s first team in the top league ACB, while mainly seeing playing time at Clinicas Rincón. He made a leap forward statistically at Rincón in 2015-16, scoring 14.9 points per outing to go along with 5.6 rebounds a game in 34 appearances in the LEB Plata.

He was an early entry candidate for the 2016 NBA draft, but decided to withdraw his name from consideration. In July 2016, he signed a two-year deal with ACB side Bàsquet Manresa.

On July 24, 2018, he parted ways with Unicaja of the Liga ACB.

On June 24, 2019, he has signed deal with Legia Warszawa of the PLK. Returning to Spain in early 2020, Belemene joined Club Melilla Baloncesto of the LEB Oro, in the summer of 2020, he signed with fellow LEB Oro side Básquet Coruña before moving to Cáceres Ciudad del Baloncesto prior to the 2021-22 campaign.

On August 1, 2025, he signed for Fuenlabrada of the Spanish Primera FEB.
