= Álvaro Muñoz (basketball) =

Spanish basketball player

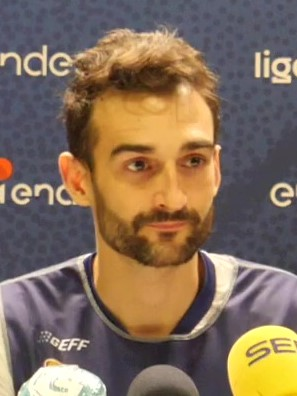

No. 35 – Palencia Baloncesto
- Position: Small forward
- League: Primera FEB

Personal information
- Born: 25 November 1990 (age 35) Ávila, Spain
- Listed height: 1.96 m (6 ft 5 in)
- Listed weight: 91 kg (201 lb)

Career information
- Playing career: 2006–present

Career history
- 2006–2008: Óbila CB
- 2008: Zarzuela Maristas
- 2008–2009: CB Valladolid
- 2009–2010: CB Illescas
- 2010–2013: Fuenlabrada
- 2013–2015: Oviedo
- 2015–2016: Riesen Ludwigsburg
- 2016–2017: Tigers Tübingen
- 2017–2019: Manresa
- 2019–2025: Monbus Obradoiro
- 2025–present: Palencia

Álvaro Muñoz Borchers (born November 25, 1990) is a Spanish professional basketball player for Palencia of the Spanish Primera FEB.

Muñoz has played several Spanish teams in the Liga ACB, including Fuenlabrada and Monbus Obradoiro. He has also played for German clubs such as Riesen Ludwigsburg and Tigers Tübingen. In June 2025, he signed for Palencia of the Spanish Primera FEB.
