= Nikola Cvetinović =

Serbian basketball player

No. 30 – retired
- Position: Power forward
- League: retired

Personal information
- Born: December 19, 1988 (age 37) Loznica, SR Serbia, SFR Yugoslavia
- Listed height: 2.03 m (6 ft 8 in)
- Listed weight: 104 kg (229 lb)

Career information
- High school: Virginia Episcopal School (Lynchburg, Virginia)
- College: Akron (2008–2012)
- NBA draft: 2012: undrafted
- Playing career: 2012–2023

Career history
- 2012–2013: AEK Larnaca
- 2013: Brno
- 2013–2014: Valladolid
- 2015: Oviedo
- 2015: Dzūkija
- 2016: Inter Bratislava
- 2016–2017: Araberri
- 2017–2019: Palencia
- 2019–2021: Almansa
- 2021: Okapi Aalst
- 2021–present: Steaua Bucharest

Career highlights
- Second-team All-MAC (2011); Third-team All-MAC (2012)

Nikola Cvetinović (born December 19, 1988) is a retired Serbian professional basketball player. He played college basketball at the University of Akron.

== Professional career ==
On July 18, 2012, he signed with AEK Larnaca of Cyprus for the 2012–13 season. On October 19, 2013, he signed with BC Brno of the Czech Republic. On December 12, 2013, he signed with CB Valladolid of the Spanish Liga ACB.

After several injuries, on December 30, 2014, Cvetinović signs with Unión Financiera Baloncesto Oviedo of the Spanish second division for the rest of the season. In December 2015, he signed with BC Dzūkija of the Lithuanian Basketball League. He left the club after appearing in only two games. In February 2016, he signed with Slovak club Inter Bratislava for the rest of the season.

In September 2016, he signed with Araberri BC of the LEB Oro. In August 2017, he moved to Palencia Baloncesto.

On January 4, 2022, Cvetinović signed with Okapi Aalst of the BNXT League. He averaged 11 points and 2.6 rebounds per game in five games. Cvetinović parted ways with the team on February 18.

== Serbian national team ==
Cvetinović was member of the team that represented Serbia at the 2011 Summer Universiade in Shenzhen, finishing as the gold medal winners.
