= Mike Torres =

Spanish-Dominican basketball player

No. 33 – HLA Alicante
- Position: Point guard
- League: Primera FEB

Personal information
- Born: 24 November 1994 (age 31) Spain
- Listed height: 6 ft 2 in (1.88 m)
- Listed weight: 176 lb (80 kg)

Career information
- NBA draft: 2016: undrafted
- Playing career: 2014–present

Career history
- 2014–2015: CB Castelldefels
- 2015–2016: CB Villarrobledo
- 2016–2017: Albacete Basket
- 2018–2020: Real Valladolid
- 2020–2021: Real Betis
- 2021: →Indios de San Francisco
- 2021: Mons-Hainaut
- 2021: Mexico City Capitanes
- 2022: Real Betis
- 2022–2025: Real Valladolid
- 2025–present: HLA Alicante

Career highlights
- LEB Oro - 2020 Champion

Michael Torres Cuevas (born 24 November 1994) is a Spanish-Dominican professional basketball player for HLA Alicante of the Spanish Primera FEB.

== Club career ==
As a Late bloomer, Mike Torres worked his way up from the Spanish fourth division (Liga EBA) to the Liga ACB within only a few years.

Mike Torres started out his club career with CB Castelldefels in the 2014–15 Liga EBA season. For the next season, he joined the competitor CB Villarrobledo.

In 2016, he joined Albacete Basket, which just got promoted to the LEB Plata.

In 2019, he made his debut in the silver category of Spanish basketball. With CB Ciudad de Valladolid, during the 2019–20 LEB Oro season, Mike Torres averaged 19 minutes in which he recorded 9 points and 2.7 assists per game.

Torres later signed with Coosur Real Betis of the Liga ACB for three seasons.

On July 30, 2021, he was loaned to Indios de San Francisco of the Dominican Republic League.

On September 10, 2021, he has signed with Belfius Mons-Hainaut of the Belgian Pro Basketball League.

On November 1, 2021, Torres signed with Mexico City Capitanes for the team's first G League season.

On January 12, 2022, Torres returned to Coosur Real Betis.

In July 2025, Torres signed for HLA Alicante of the Primera FEB.

== National team ==
Torres has been a member of the Dominican Republic men's national basketball team.
