= 2025–26 Primera FEB =

30th season of the Spanish second basketball league

Primera FEB
- Season: 2025–26
- Matches played: 290
- Teams: 17

Final standings
- Champions: Monbus Obradoiro (1st title)
- Promoted: Monbus Obradoiro; Leyma Coruña
- Relegated: Grupo Caesa Seguros FC Cartagena CB; Melilla Ciudad del Deporte

Records
- Biggest home win: Obradoiro 101–49 Cartagena (10 March 2026)
- Biggest away win: Palmer 45–115 Obradoiro (21 December 2025)
- Highest scoring: Zamora 104–102 Oviedo (21 December 2025); Palma 102–104 Alicante (11 March 2026)

The 2025–26 Primera FEB was the 30th season of the Spanish basketball second league. It started on 26 September 2025 with the first round of the regular season and ended on 7 June 2026 with the Final Four.

== Teams ==
=== Promotion and relegation (pre-season) ===
A total of 17 teams contested the league, including 13 sides from the 2024–25 season, one relegated from the 2024–25 ACB and three promoted from the 2024–25 Segunda FEB. On 24 July 2025, Real Betis Baloncesto did not fulfill the requirements to register the team in Liga ACB, leaving a vacant berth to Coviran Granada in the top tier. Therefore, on 30 July 2025, Real Betis Baloncesto stepped down to rejoin the league while focused on taking legal action against ACB leaving a 17–team league in Primera FEB.

▼ Relegated from Liga ACB	▲ Promoted to Liga ACB
~~Coviran Granada~~ (Note: It achieved a vacant berth after Real Betis Baloncesto did not fulfill the requirements to join the top tier.); Leyma Coruña	Silbö San Pablo Burgos; ~~Real Betis Baloncesto~~ (Note: It did not fulfill the requirements to register the team in the top tier. Therefore, it stepped down to rejoin the league while focused on taking legal action against ACB to join to the Spanish top league.)
▲ Promoted from Segunda FEB	▼ Relegated to Segunda FEB
Palmer Basket Mallorca Palma; Melilla Ciudad del Deporte; Fibwi Mallorca Bàsquet Palma	UEMC Real Valladolid Baloncesto; Amics Castelló; CB Naturavia Morón

=== Venues and locations ===
Location of teams in 2025–26 Primera FEB

Team	Home city	Arena	Capacity
Alimerka Oviedo Baloncesto	Oviedo	Palacio de los Deportes	5,340
Caja Rural CB Zamora	Zamora	Ángel Nieto	1,500
Cloud.gal Ourense Baloncesto	Ourense	Pazo Paco Paz	5,500
Fibwi Mallorca Bàsquet Palma	Palma	Son Moix	3,800
Flexicar Fuenlabrada	Fuenlabrada	Fernando Martín	5,700
Grupo Alega Cantabria	Torrelavega	Vicente Trueba	2,688
Grupo Caesa Seguros FC Cartagena CB	Cartagena	Palacio de Deportes	5,162
Grupo Ureta Tizona Burgos	Burgos	Polideportivo El Plantío	2,432
Hestia Menorca	Mahón	Pavelló Menorca	5,115
HLA Alicante	Alicante	Pedro Ferrándiz	5,696
Inveready Gipuzkoa	San Sebastián	Amenabar Arena	11,000
Leyma Coruña	A Coruña	Coliseum da Coruña	9,300
Melilla Ciudad del Deporte	Melilla	Javier Imbroda Ortiz	2,900
Monbus Obradoiro	Santiago de Compostela	Multiusos Fontes do Sar	6,000
Movistar Estudiantes	Madrid	Movistar Arena	13,109
Movistar Estudiantes	Madrid	Movistar Academy Magariños	600
Palmer Basket Mallorca Palma	Palma	Son Moix	3,800
Súper Agropal Palencia	Palencia	Municipal de Deportes	5,012

== Regular season ==
=== League table ===
Pos	Team	Pld	W	L	PF	PA	PD	Pts	Promotion, qualification or relegation
1	Monbus Obradoiro	32	28	4	2945	2420	+525	60	Promotion to Liga ACB
2	Leyma Coruña	32	28	4	2896	2502	+394	60	Qualification to playoffs
3	Súper Agropal Palencia	32	25	7	2675	2324	+351	57	Qualification to playoffs
4	Movistar Estudiantes	32	20	12	2682	2561	+121	52	Qualification to playoffs
5	Inveready Gipuzkoa	32	19	13	2520	2386	+134	51	Qualification to playoffs
6	Alimerka Oviedo Baloncesto	32	19	13	2626	2494	+132	51	Qualification to playoffs
7	Flexicar Fuenlabrada	32	19	13	2553	2582	−29	51	Qualification to playoffs
8	Hestia Menorca	32	17	15	2574	2456	+118	49	Qualification to playoffs
9	HLA Alicante	32	15	17	2632	2628	+4	47	Qualification to playoffs
10	Caja Rural CB Zamora	32	15	17	2676	2748	−72	47	
11	Grupo Alega Cantabria	32	12	20	2481	2708	−227	44	
12	Cloud.gal Ourense Baloncesto	32	12	20	2530	2604	−74	44	
13	Grupo Ureta Tizona Burgos	32	10	22	2668	2847	−179	42	
14	Fibwi Mallorca Bàsquet Palma	32	10	22	2437	2629	−192	42	
15	Palmer Basket Mallorca Palma	32	8	24	2316	2653	−337	40	
16	Grupo Caesa Seguros FC Cartagena CB	32	8	24	2367	2712	−345	40	Relegation to Segunda FEB
17	Melilla Ciudad del Deporte	32	7	25	2445	2769	−324	39	Relegation to Segunda FEB

Source: FEB

=== Results ===
Home \ Away	OVI	ZAM	OUR	PLM	FUE	CAN	CAR	TIZ	MEN	ALI	GIP	COR	MEL	OBR	EST	MLL	PAL
Alimerka Oviedo	—	90–80	75–73	83–64	65–73	97–79	92–80	93–80	67–75	76–74	90–71	84–89	101–70	75–79	87–101	89–74	61–76
Caja Rural Zamora	104–102	—	84–94	81–79	80–79	86–89	90–71	101–95	72–67	83–76	70–101	69–81	97–88	77–92	75–86	99–76	77–102
Cloud.gal Ourense	70–74	84–105	—	81–69	69–72	67–72	91–65	79–77	84–80	81–75	77–89	59–74	98–75	96–93	103–97	82–69	90–93
Fibwi Mallorca Palma	69–95	88–83	83–76	—	79–80	68–73	77–80	87–86	69–76	102–104	63–73	76–94	84–78	63–87	80–76	82–80	86–93
Flexicar Fuenlabrada	71–92	79–61	78–71	99–81	—	90–75	91–82	76–69	78–71	87–90	70–87	75–74	82–73	77–97	77–70	87–67	73–67
Grupo Alega Cantabria	79–87	72–96	87–66	77–65	80–89	—	78–72	84–91	83–80	74–82	91–90	79–88	76–72	65–95	80–78	73–76	58–107
Grupo Caesa Seguros Cartagena	82–78	64–78	81–80	72–70	75–88	68–74	—	89–87	79–83	78–77	64–84	80–89	82–68	68–94	68–95	66–82	72–82
Grupo Ureta Tizona	82–89	93–101	77–99	80–76	89–93	86–77	93–80	—	85–102	72–85	81–73	82–97	106–91	99–96	76–96	95–59	74–91
Hestia Menorca	65–72	88–74	73–70	70–71	80–70	89–81	97–61	88–70	—	81–68	71–64	80–102	102–72	97–77	86–96	89–74	67–72
HLA Alicante	88–89	94–86	87–76	81–74	91–86	101–90	95–77	92–97	58–76	—	74–87	89–96	78–71	80–103	83–81	109–73	63–82
Inveready Gipuzkoa	74–69	82–86	81–79	65–71	90–74	88–77	75–69	93–65	84–66	77–70	—	63–79	84–62	95–96	73–66	82–65	57–71
Leyma Coruña	87–72	81–76	94–77	94–72	101–75	102–67	82–77	105–84	81–72	83–74	92–81	—	101–89	84–92	105–82	91–75	82–75
Melilla Ciudad del Deporte	79–87	94–87	84–93	72–79	84–77	83–77	84–91	81–96	65–95	79–90	73–54	72–105	—	70–92	70–82	90–76	80–75
Monbus Obradoiro	86–68	106–80	94–57	99–89	97–69	82–87	101–49	93–68	100–86	87–75	85–68	103–99	79–59	—	89–79	89–80	81–53
Movistar Estudiantes	75–69	86–77	92–75	90–66	99–76	81–74	90–84	102–85	85–78	88–82	93–88	87–92	86–73	78–79	—	73–70	72–94
Palmer Basket Mallorca Palma	57–78	92–95	72–56	59–85	79–88	86–83	77–68	88–72	83–80	77–68	63–71	65–85	75–82	45–115	64–68	—	69–78
Súper Agropal Palencia	88–80	77–66	83–77	92–70	97–74	100–70	90–73	91–76	89–64	59–79	64–76	99–87	82–62	85–87	83–52	85–69	—

Source: FEB
Legend: Blue = home team win; Red = away team win.

== Playoffs ==
=== Bracket ===
Quarter-finals
C	Movistar Estudiantes	93	74	113	3
9	HLA Alicante	77	67	72	0
5	Inveready Gipuzkoa	79	75	75	0
6	Alimerka Oviedo Baloncesto	93	83	82	3
2	Leyma Coruña	93	81	82	87	3
8	Hestia Menorca	71	76	85	76	1
3	Súper Agropal Palencia	90	83	81	72	76	3
7	Flexicar Fuenlabrada	52	79	88	78	51	2

Semi-finals
Movistar Estudiantes	79
Alimerka Oviedo Baloncesto	71
Leyma Coruña	92
Súper Agropal Palencia	81

Final
Movistar Estudiantes	97
Leyma Coruña	100

Source: FEB

=== Quarter-finals ===
The first legs were played on 14–15 May, the second legs were played on 17 May, the third legs will be played on 22 May, the fourth legs will be played on 24 May, if necessary, and the fifth legs will be played on 28–29 May 2026, if necessary.

Team 1	Series	Team 2	1st leg	2nd leg	3rd leg	4th leg	5th leg
Movistar Estudiantes	3–0	HLA Alicante	93–77	74–67	113–72	—	—
Leyma Coruña	3–1	Hestia Menorca	93–71	81–76	82–85	87–76	—
Súper Agropal Palencia	3–2	Flexicar Fuenlabrada	90–52	83–79	81–88	72–78	76–51
Inveready Gipuzkoa	0–3	Alimerka Oviedo Baloncesto	79–93	75–83	75–82	—	—

Source: FEB

==== First leg ====
14 May 2026	Leyma Coruña	93–71 (Series: 1–0)	Hestia Menorca	A Coruña
20:00	Scoring by quarter: 20–15, 23–22, 18–15, 32–19
	Pts: Diop 22; Rebs: Thiam 8 Asts: Jorgensen 4 Eff: Diop 24	Boxscore	Pts: Sola 16; Rebs: Vicedo 5 Asts: Zurbriggen 8 Eff: Sola 21	Arena: Coliseum da Coruña; Attendance: 4,861; Referees: Asier Quintas, Héctor Báez, José Carlos Sierra

15 May 2026	Inveready Gipuzkoa	79–93 (Series: 0–1)	Alimerka Oviedo Baloncesto	San Sebastián
19:30	Scoring by quarter: 23–19, 19–27, 21–22, 16–25
	Pts: Ngon 22; Rebs: Ngom 12; Asts: Tate, Varela 3 Eff: Ngom 39	Boxscore	Pts: Townes 19; Rebs: Lobaco, Townes 6 Asts: Townes 7 Eff: Townes 30	Arena: Amenabar Arena; Attendance: 980; Referees: Francisco José Zafra, Paula Lema, Israel Chacón

15 May 2026	Movistar Estudiantes	93–77 (Series: 1–0)	HLA Alicante	Madrid
20:00	Scoring by quarter: 27–18, 23–16, 15–23, 28–20
	Pts: García 19; Rebs: Stumbris 6 Asts: Granger 6 Eff: García 24	Boxscore	Pts: Joseph 17; Rebs: Larsen, Polanco 5 Asts: Larsen 6 Eff: Joseph 14	Arena: Movistar Academy Magariños; Attendance: 1,427; Referees: Jacobo Rial, Juan Ramón Hurtado, Laura Piñeiro

15 May 2026	Súper Agropal Palencia	90–52 (Series: 1–0)	Flexicar Fuenlabrada	Palencia
21:30	Scoring by quarter: 17–16, 22–12, 25–7, 26–17
	Pts: Kunkel 20; Rebs: Kamba, Kunkel 7 Asts: Vučetić 4 Eff: Vrankić 22	Boxscore	Pts: Díaz 12; Rebs: Lima 7 Asts: four players 4 Eff: DeBisschop 8	Arena: Municipal de Deportes; Attendance: 9,927; Referees: Ángel de Lucas, Daniel Checa, José Javier Marqueta

==== Second leg ====
17 May 2026	Inveready Gipuzkoa	75–83 (Series: 0–2)	Alimerka Oviedo Baloncesto	San Sebastián
17:00	Scoring by quarter: 13–25, 24–27, 22–17, 16–14
	Pts: Tate 18; Rebs: Ngon 10; Asts: Zubizarreta 4 Eff: Hanzlík 18	Boxscore	Pts: Hermanson 16; Rebs: Lobaco, Townes 6 Asts: Townes 6 Eff: Cosialls, Lobaco 18	Arena: Amenabar Arena; Attendance: 2,300; Referees: Carlos García, Daniel Checa, Jaime Gómez

17 May 2026	Movistar Estudiantes	74–67 (Series: 2–0)	HLA Alicante	Madrid
18:30	Scoring by quarter: 18–15, 21–19, 18–17, 17–16
	Pts: Silverio 14; Rebs: Nwogbo 5 Asts: Granger, McGrew 4 Eff: Silverio 17	Boxscore	Pts: Polanco 15; Rebs: Larsen 7 Asts: Joseph 8 Eff: Larsen 16	Arena: Movistar Arena; Attendance: 7,524; Referees: Asier Quintas, Josep María Olivares, Pol Franquesa

17 May 2026	Leyma Coruña	81–76 (Series: 2–0)	Hestia Menorca	A Coruña
20:00	Scoring by quarter: 20–23, 18–19, 17–16, 26–18
	Pts: Díaz 12; Rebs: Thiam 6 Asts: Cuevas 7 Eff: Cuevas 13	Boxscore	Pts: Zurbriggen 22; Rebs: Sola 7 Asts: Zurbriggen 5 Eff: Zurbriggen 27	Arena: Coliseum da Coruña; Attendance: 5,212; Referees: Leandro Lezcano, Juan Pedro Morales, Mikel Cañigueral

17 May 2026	Súper Agropal Palencia	83–79 (Series: 2–0)	Flexicar Fuenlabrada	Palencia
20:00	Scoring by quarter: 16–23, 29–22, 11–17, 27–17
	Pts: Vrankić 17; Rebs: Vrankić 10; Asts: Borg 5 Eff: Vrankić 26	Boxscore	Pts: Ali 21; Rebs: Ali 7 Asts: Renfroe 8 Eff: Ali 24	Arena: Municipal de Deportes; Attendance: 4,973; Referees: Germán Morales, Jacobo Rial, Jesús Marcos Martínez

==== Third leg ====
22 May 2026	HLA Alicante	72–113 (Series: 0–3)	Movistar Estudiantes	Alicante
20:00	Scoring by quarter: 27–33, 20–30, 13–25, 12–25
	Pts: Larsen 17; Rebs: Larsen 8 Asts: Polanco 4 Eff: Larsen 28	Boxscore	Pts: Salin 17; Rebs: Niang 6 Asts: Granger 9 Eff: Granger 24	Arena: Pedro Ferrándiz; Attendance: 1,847; Referees: Ángel de Lucas, Paula Lema, Rodrigo Palanca

22 May 2026	Alimerka Oviedo Baloncesto	82–75 (Series: 3–0)	Inveready Gipuzkoa	Oviedo
20:00	Scoring by quarter: 26–20, 22–18, 19–12, 15–25
	Pts: Townes 16; Rebs: Faure 7 Asts: Townes 7 Eff: Cosialls 19	Boxscore	Pts: McGhie 20; Rebs: Korsantia 7 Asts: Varela 4 Eff: Ansorregi 23	Arena: Palacio de los Deportes; Referees: Javier Ávila, Antonio Zamora, Alejandro Aranzana

22 May 2026	Hestia Menorca	85–82(OT) (Series: 1–2)	Leyma Coruña	Mahón
21:00	Scoring by quarter: 15–21, 23–23, 16–9, 20–21, Overtime: 11–8
	Pts: Littleson 19; Rebs: three players 7 Asts: Zurbriggen 6 Eff: Zurbriggen 20	Boxscore	Pts: Cremo 19; Rebs: Thiam 11; Asts: Pacheco 7 Eff: Cremo 15	Arena: Pavelló Menorca; Attendance: 2,413; Referees: Francisco José Zafra, Fernando Ibáñez, Cristina Adán

22 May 2026	Flexicar Fuenlabrada	88–81 (Series: 1–2)	Súper Agropal Palencia	Fuenlabrada
21:00	Scoring by quarter: 18–14, 24–15, 27–22, 19–30
	Pts: Benite, Manchón 20; Rebs: Kasibabu 8 Asts: Díaz 3 Eff: Benite 21	Boxscore	Pts: Jakovičs 16; Rebs: Vrankić 10; Asts: Borg, Jakovičs 3 Eff: Vrankić 28	Arena: Fernando Martín; Attendance: 2,298; Referees: Leandro Lezcano, Héctor Báez, Josep María Olivares

==== Fourth leg ====
24 May 2026	Hestia Menorca	76–87 (Series: 1–3)	Leyma Coruña	Mahón
19:00	Scoring by quarter: 7–21, 22–28, 20–19, 27–19
	Pts: Littleson 22; Rebs: Galette, Vicedo 6 Asts: Zurbriggen 5 Eff: Littleson 18	Boxscore	Pts: Jou 16; Rebs: Diop 9 Asts: Pacheco 4 Eff: Jou 21	Arena: Pavelló Menorca; Attendance: 2,968; Referees: Leandro Lezcano, Carlos García, Alejandro Aranzana

24 May 2026	Flexicar Fuenlabrada	78–72 (Series: 2–2)	Súper Agropal Palencia	Fuenlabrada
19:00	Scoring by quarter: 13–16, 21–22, 22–22, 22–12
	Pts: Ali 17; Rebs: DeBisschop 9 Asts: Renfroe 6 Eff: Renfroe 25	Boxscore	Pts: Wintering 15; Rebs: Kamba 6 Asts: Jakovičs 4 Eff: Jakovičs, Kunkel 10	Arena: Fernando Martín; Attendance: 2,037; Referees: Ángel de Lucas, Asier Quintas, Javier Ávila

==== Fifth leg ====
29 May 2026	Súper Agropal Palencia	76–51 (Series: 3–2)	Flexicar Fuenlabrada	Palencia
21:00	Scoring by quarter: 26–9, 15–12, 22–12, 13–18
	Pts: Wintering 14; Rebs: Armus 9 Asts: Jakovičs 5 Eff: Jakovičs 17	Boxscore	Pts: Díaz 14; Rebs: Kasibabu 8 Asts: three players 2 Eff: Díaz 17	Arena: Municipal de Deportes; Attendance: 5,027; Referees: Francisco José Zafra, Carlos García, Israel Chacón

=== Semi-finals ===
The semi-finals were played on 6 June 2026 at the Coliseum da Coruña in the city of A Coruña.

6 June 2025	Leyma Coruña	92–81	Súper Agropal Palencia	A Coruña
17:30	Scoring by quarter: 20–16, 18–24, 28–21, 26–20
	Pts: Pacheco 25; Rebs: Barro 8 Asts: Cremo, Jorgensen 2 Eff: Pacheco 24	Boxscore	Pts: Kamba 18; Rebs: Vrankić 7 Asts: Borg, Jakovičs 3 Eff: Vrankić 20	Arena: Coliseum da Coruña; Attendance: 6,561; Referees: Francisco José Zafra, Carlos García, Javier Ávila

6 June 2025	Movistar Estudiantes	79–71	Alimerka Oviedo Baloncesto	A Coruña
20:15	Scoring by quarter: 18–23, 28–16, 20–18, 13–14
	Pts: Granger 16; Rebs: García, Niang 5 Asts: Granger 5 Eff: Granger 19	Boxscore	Pts: Parham 23; Rebs: Cosialls 6 Asts: three players 2 Eff: Parham 21	Arena: Coliseum da Coruña; Attendance: 4,305; Referees: Leandro Lezcano, Asier Quintas, Paula Lema

=== Final ===
The final was played on 7 June 2026 at the Coliseum da Coruña in the city of A Coruña.

7 June 2025	Movistar Estudiantes	97–100(OT)	Leyma Coruña	A Coruña
19:00	Scoring by quarter: 6–12, 28–24, 31–21, 15–23, Overtime: 17–20
	Pts: Silverio 30; Rebs: Silverio 8 Asts: García, McGrew 4 Eff: Silverio 32	Boxscore	Pts: Jorgensen 22; Rebs: Barro 6 Asts: four players 4 Eff: Jorgensen 21	Arena: Coliseum da Coruña; Attendance: 7,284; Referees: Ángel de Lucas, Francisco José Zafra, Leandro Lezcano

== Final standings ==
Pos	Team	Pld	W	L	Promotion or relegation
1	Monbus Obradoiro (C, P)	32	28	4	Promotion to Liga ACB
2	Leyma Coruña (P)	38	33	5	Promotion to Liga ACB
3	Movistar Estudiantes	37	24	13	
4	Súper Agropal Palencia	38	28	10	
5	Alimerka Oviedo Baloncesto	36	22	14	
6	Inveready Gipuzkoa	35	19	16	
7	Flexicar Fuenlabrada	37	21	16	
8	Hestia Menorca	36	18	18	
9	HLA Alicante	35	15	20	
10	Caja Rural CB Zamora	32	15	17	
11	Grupo Alega Cantabria	32	12	20	
12	Cloud.gal Ourense Baloncesto	32	12	20	
13	Grupo Ureta Tizona Burgos	32	10	22	
14	Fibwi Mallorca Bàsquet Palma	32	10	22	
15	Palmer Basket Mallorca Palma	32	8	24	
16	Grupo Caesa Seguros FC Cartagena CB (R)	32	8	24	Relegation to Segunda FEB
17	Melilla Ciudad del Deporte (R)	32	7	25	Relegation to Segunda FEB

Source: FEB
(C) Champions; (P) Promoted; (R) Relegated
