= 2021–22 LEB Oro season =

LEB Oro
- Season: 2021–22
- Games played: 324
- Teams: 18

Regular season
- Promoted: Covirán Granada; Bàsquet Girona
- Relegated: CB Prat; Palmer Alma Mediterrànea; Levitec Huesca La Magia

Finals
- Champions: Covirán Granada (1st title)

Records
- Biggest home win: Girona 89–47 Huesca (3 December 2021); Granada 102–60 Almansa (13 May 2022)
- Biggest away win: Huesca 50–85 Girona (31 March 2022)
- Highest scoring: Castelló 103–98 Palma (8 April 2022)

The 2021–22 LEB Oro season was the 26th season of the Spanish basketball second league. It started on 8 October 2021 with the first round of the regular season and ended on 19 June 2022 with the Final Four.

== Format changes ==
For this season, the league was back to 18 teams and brought back the single group with a single group phase in which the top team of the regular season promoted directly to Liga ACB. At the same time, the teams placed between 2nd and 9th qualified for the playoffs to decide the second promotion to Liga ACB and the last three teams were relegated to LEB Plata. For the playoffs, the quarter-finals were played in a best-of-five series and the semi-finals and the final were played in a single-game format in a neutral venue.

== Teams ==
=== Promotion and relegation (pre-season) ===
A total of 18 teams contested the league, including 14 sides from the 2020–21 season, two relegated from the 2020–21 ACB and two promoted from the 2020–21 LEB Plata. On July 5, 2021, Real Murcia resigned to play in the league due to lack of financial support.

Teams relegated from Liga ACB

- Movistar Estudiantes
- Acunsa Gipuzkoa

Teams promoted from LEB Plata

- Juaristi ISB
- ~~Barça B~~ (swapped places with ICG Força Lleida which avoided relegation to LEB Plata)
- CB Prat

=== Venues and locations ===
Location of teams in 2021–22 LEB Oro

| Team | Home city | Arena | Capacity |
|---|---|---|---|
| Acunsa Gipuzkoa | San Sebastián | Donostia Arena | 11,000 |
| Bàsquet Girona | Girona | Fontajau | 5,500 |
| Cáceres Patrimonio de la Humanidad | Cáceres | Multiusos Ciudad de Cáceres | 6,500 |
| CB Almansa con Afanion | Almansa | Municipal | 1,500 |
| CB Prat | El Prat de Llobregat | Pavelló Joan Busquets | 500 |
| Covirán Granada | Granada | Palacio de Deportes | 7,242 |
| HLA Alicante | Alicante | Pedro Ferrándiz | 5,700 |
| ICG Força Lleida | Lleida | Pavelló Barris Nord | 6,100 |
| Juaristi ISB | Azpeitia | Municipal | 1,000 |
| Juaristi ISB | Azkoitia | Municipal | 500 |
| Levitec Huesca La Magia | Huesca | Palacio Municipal de Huesca | 4,900 |
| Leyma Coruña | A Coruña | Pazo dos Deportes de Riazor | 5,000 |
| Melilla Sport Capital | Melilla | Pabellón Javier Imbroda Ortiz | 3,800 |
| Melilla Sport Capital | Melilla | Guillermo García Pezzi | 984 |
| Movistar Estudiantes | Madrid | WiZink Center | 13,109 |
| Movistar Estudiantes | Madrid | Antonio Magariños | 700 |
| Palmer Alma Mediterrànea Palma | Palma | Son Moix | 3,800 |
| TAU Castelló | Castellón | Pabellón Ciutat de Castelló | 6,000 |
| UEMC Real Valladolid | Valladolid | Pisuerga | 6,800 |
| Unicaja Banco Oviedo | Oviedo | Polideportivo de Pumarín | 1,138 |
| Zunder Palencia | Palencia | Pabellón Municipal | 5,000 |

=== Personnel and sponsorship ===
| Team | Head coach | Kit manufacturer | Shirt sponsor |
|---|---|---|---|
| Acunsa Gipuzkoa | Lolo Encinas | Hummel | Acunsa, Gipuzkoa Kirolak |
| Bàsquet Girona | Jordi Sargatal | Nike | |
| Cáceres Patrimonio de la Humanidad | Roberto Blanco | Erreà | Extremadura |
| CB Almansa con Afanion | Rubén Perelló | Joma | Afanion |
| CB Prat | Josep Maria Berrocal | Wibo | |
| Covirán Granada | Pablo Pin | Vive | Supermercados Covirán |
| HLA Alicante | Gonzalo García de Vitoria | Score Tech | Grupo Hospitalario HLA |
| ICG Força Lleida | Gerard Encuentra | Pentex | ICG Software |
| Juaristi ISB | Iñaki Jiménez | Wibo | Juaristi, Orain Gipuzkoa |
| Levitec Huesca La Magia | Carlos Lanau | Barri-Ball | Levitec, Huesca La Magia |
| Leyma Coruña | Sergio García | Macron | Leche Leyma |
| Melilla Sport Capital | Rafa Monclova | Wibo | Melilla Sport Capital |
| Movistar Estudiantes | Diego Epifanio | Puma | Movistar |
| Palmer Alma Mediterrànea Palma | Pau Tomàs | Erreà | Palmer Inmobiliaria |
| Palmer Alma Mediterrànea Palma | Álex Pérez | Erreà | Palmer Inmobiliaria |
| TAU Castelló | Toni Ten | Score Tech | TAU Cerámica |
| UEMC Real Valladolid | Paco García | Adidas | UEMC |
| Unicaja Banco Oviedo | Natxo Lezkano | Spalding | Unicaja, Oviedo, Asturias |
| Zunder Palencia | Pedro Rivero | Kappa | Zunder |

=== Managerial changes ===
| Team | Outgoing manager | Manner of departure | Date of vacancy | Position in table | Replaced with | Date of appointment |
|---|---|---|---|---|---|---|
| UEMC Real Valladolid | Hugo López | Resigned | 14 May 2021 | Pre-season | Roberto González | 25 May 2021 |
| Zunder Palencia | Arturo Álvarez | Resigned | 17 May 2021 | Pre-season | Pedro Rivero | 25 June 2021 |
| Melilla Sport Capital | Alejandro Alcoba | Resigned | 19 May 2021 | Pre-season | Arturo Álvarez | 16 June 2021 |
| ICG Força Lleida | Gustavo Aranzana | Resigned | 19 May 2021 | Pre-season | Gerard Encuentra | 14 June 2021 |
| Acunsa Gipuzkoa | Marcelo Nicola | End of contract | 3 June 2021 | Pre-season | Lolo Encinas | 25 June 2021 |
| HLA Alicante | Pedro Rivero | End of contract | 24 June 2021 | Pre-season | Gonzalo García de Vitoria | 2 July 2021 |
| Levitec Huesca La Magia | Óscar Lata | Signed for UCAM Murcia | 6 July 2021 | Pre-season | Sergio Lamúa | 16 July 2021 |
| CB Prat | Dani Miret | Signed for Joventut | 16 July 2021 | Pre-season | Josep Maria Berrocal | 17 July 2021 |
| Bàsquet Girona | Carles Marco | Sacked | 15 November 2021 | 14th (2–6) | Jordi Sargatal | 30 November 2021 |
| Levitec Huesca La Magia | Sergio Lamúa | Sacked | 26 January 2022 | 18th (1–14) | Carlos Lanau | 26 January 2022 |
| UEMC Real Valladolid | Roberto González | Sacked | 16 March 2022 | 14th (9–15) | Paco García | 17 March 2022 |
| Melilla Sport Capital | Arturo Álvarez | Resigned | 26 March 2022 | 13th (11–15) | Rafa Monclova | 28 March 2022 |
| Movistar Estudiantes | Jota Cuspinera | Sacked | 21 April 2022 | 2nd (21–7) | Diego Epifanio | 21 April 2022 |

== Regular season ==
=== League table ===
| Pos | Team | Pld | W | L | PF | PA | PD | Pts | Promotion, qualification or relegation |
|---|---|---|---|---|---|---|---|---|---|
| 1 | Covirán Granada | 34 | 26 | 8 | 2755 | 2427 | +328 | 60 | Promotion to Liga ACB |
| 2 | Movistar Estudiantes | 34 | 25 | 9 | 2691 | 2384 | +307 | 59 | Qualification to playoffs |
| 3 | ICG Força Lleida | 34 | 22 | 12 | 2757 | 2711 | +46 | 56 | Qualification to playoffs |
| 4 | Bàsquet Girona | 34 | 21 | 13 | 2675 | 2488 | +187 | 55 | Qualification to playoffs |
| 5 | Zunder Palencia | 34 | 20 | 14 | 2642 | 2579 | +63 | 54 | Qualification to playoffs |
| 6 | Unicaja Banco Oviedo | 34 | 19 | 15 | 2610 | 2568 | +42 | 53 | Qualification to playoffs |
| 7 | Leyma Coruña | 34 | 19 | 15 | 2738 | 2591 | +147 | 53 | Qualification to playoffs |
| 8 | Cáceres Patrimonio de la Humanidad | 34 | 19 | 15 | 2607 | 2704 | −97 | 53 | Qualification to playoffs |
| 9 | UEMC Real Valladolid | 34 | 18 | 16 | 2600 | 2601 | −1 | 52 | Qualification to playoffs |
| 10 | TAU Castelló | 34 | 17 | 17 | 2703 | 2713 | −10 | 51 | |
| 11 | Acunsa Gipuzkoa | 34 | 17 | 17 | 2609 | 2622 | −13 | 51 | |
| 12 | HLA Alicante | 34 | 16 | 18 | 2672 | 2632 | +40 | 50 | |
| 13 | Melilla Sport Capital | 34 | 14 | 20 | 2559 | 2668 | −109 | 48 | |
| 14 | CB Almansa con Afanion | 34 | 13 | 21 | 2704 | 2830 | −126 | 47 | |
| 15 | Juaristi ISB | 34 | 13 | 21 | 2616 | 2721 | −105 | 47 | |
| 16 | CB Prat | 34 | 12 | 22 | 2615 | 2680 | −65 | 46 | Relegation to LEB Plata |
| 17 | Palmer Alma Mediterrànea Palma | 34 | 10 | 24 | 2669 | 2813 | −144 | 44 | Relegation to LEB Plata |
| 18 | Levitec Huesca La Magia | 34 | 5 | 29 | 2382 | 2872 | −490 | 39 | Relegation to LEB Plata |

Source: FEB

=== Positions by round ===
The table lists the positions of teams after completion of each round. In order to preserve chronological evolvements, any postponed matches are not included in the round at which they are originally scheduled, but added to the full round they are played immediately afterwards.

| Team ╲ Round | 1 | 2 | 3 | 4 | 5 | 6 | 7 | 8 | 9 | 10 | 11 | 12 | 13 | 14 | 15 | 16 | 17 | 18 | 19 | 20 | 21 | 22 | 23 | 24 | 25 | 26 | 27 | 28 | 29 | 30 | 31 | 32 | 33 | 34 |
|---|---|---|---|---|---|---|---|---|---|---|---|---|---|---|---|---|---|---|---|---|---|---|---|---|---|---|---|---|---|---|---|---|---|---|
| Covirán Granada | 8 | 3 | 8 | 4 | 2 | 1 | 1 | 2 | 2 | 4 | 2 | 2 | 2 | 2 | 1 | 1 | 2 | 1 | 1 | 1 | 2 | 2 | 1 | 1 | 1 | 2 | 2 | 1 | 1 | 1 | 1 | 1 | 1 | 1 |
| Movistar Estudiantes | 2 | 1 | 1 | 1 | 4 | 4 | 2 | 1 | 1 | 1 | 1 | 1 | 1 | 1 | 2 | 2 | 1 | 2 | 2 | 2 | 1 | 1 | 2 | 2 | 2 | 1 | 1 | 2 | 2 | 2 | 2 | 2 | 2 | 2 |
| ICG Força Lleida | 17 | 12 | 10 | 8 | 6 | 8 | 6 | 6 | 6 | 5 | 5 | 4 | 3 | 3 | 3 | 3 | 3 | 3 | 3 | 3 | 3 | 3 | 3 | 3 | 3 | 3 | 3 | 3 | 3 | 3 | 3 | 3 | 3 | 3 |
| Bàsquet Girona | 5 | 2 | 7 | 11 | 10 | 14 | 14 | 14 | 15 | 14 | 13 | 12 | 10 | 12 | 11 | 11 | 14 | 14 | 12 | 11 | 9 | 6 | 7 | 9 | 5 | 5 | 5 | 5 | 5 | 4 | 4 | 5 | 4 | 4 |
| Zunder Palencia | 6 | 6 | 3 | 2 | 1 | 3 | 5 | 4 | 3 | 3 | 4 | 5 | 6 | 6 | 6 | 5 | 4 | 5 | 5 | 6 | 4 | 4 | 4 | 4 | 4 | 4 | 4 | 4 | 4 | 5 | 5 | 4 | 5 | 5 |
| Unicaja Banco Oviedo | 9 | 4 | 2 | 5 | 3 | 2 | 4 | 5 | 4 | 2 | 3 | 3 | 4 | 4 | 4 | 6 | 6 | 7 | 8 | 8 | 10 | 10 | 9 | 5 | 6 | 6 | 6 | 6 | 6 | 6 | 8 | 6 | 6 | 6 |
| Leyma Coruña | 12 | 14 | 11 | 10 | 7 | 6 | 3 | 3 | 5 | 6 | 6 | 6 | 5 | 5 | 5 | 4 | 5 | 4 | 4 | 4 | 6 | 9 | 6 | 6 | 7 | 10 | 8 | 7 | 7 | 8 | 6 | 7 | 7 | 7 |
| Cáceres P. Humanidad | 7 | 5 | 4 | 7 | 5 | 7 | 10 | 10 | 12 | 13 | 12 | 10 | 8 | 11 | 10 | 9 | 7 | 8 | 7 | 5 | 5 | 7 | 10 | 11 | 8 | 9 | 7 | 8 | 8 | 9 | 9 | 8 | 8 | 8 |
| UEMC Real Valladolid | 11 | 9 | 12 | 12 | 11 | 10 | 9 | 9 | 11 | 11 | 11 | 9 | 13 | 13 | 13 | 13 | 12 | 11 | 14 | 14 | 13 | 13 | 13 | 14 | 13 | 12 | 12 | 12 | 12 | 11 | 11 | 10 | 10 | 9 |
| TAU Castelló | 3 | 8 | 6 | 3 | 8 | 5 | 7 | 7 | 7 | 7 | 7 | 7 | 7 | 7 | 8 | 10 | 9 | 6 | 6 | 7 | 7 | 8 | 5 | 7 | 11 | 8 | 11 | 9 | 9 | 7 | 7 | 9 | 9 | 10 |
| Acunsa Gipuzkoa | 1 | 7 | 5 | 9 | 12 | 9 | 8 | 8 | 8 | 10 | 10 | 8 | 11 | 9 | 7 | 7 | 8 | 9 | 9 | 9 | 8 | 5 | 8 | 8 | 9 | 11 | 10 | 10 | 10 | 10 | 10 | 11 | 11 | 11 |
| HLA Alicante | 10 | 13 | 14 | 14 | 14 | 13 | 13 | 13 | 10 | 9 | 9 | 13 | 14 | 14 | 14 | 14 | 13 | 12 | 10 | 10 | 11 | 11 | 11 | 10 | 10 | 7 | 9 | 11 | 11 | 12 | 12 | 12 | 12 | 12 |
| Melilla Sport Capital | 4 | 10 | 9 | 6 | 9 | 11 | 12 | 11 | 9 | 8 | 8 | 11 | 9 | 8 | 9 | 8 | 10 | 10 | 13 | 13 | 12 | 12 | 12 | 12 | 12 | 13 | 14 | 14 | 14 | 14 | 14 | 13 | 13 | 13 |
| CB Almansa con Afanion | 18 | 11 | 13 | 13 | 13 | 12 | 11 | 12 | 13 | 12 | 15 | 14 | 12 | 10 | 12 | 12 | 11 | 13 | 11 | 12 | 14 | 14 | 14 | 13 | 14 | 14 | 13 | 13 | 13 | 13 | 13 | 14 | 14 | 14 |
| Juaristi ISB | 14 | 15 | 15 | 16 | 15 | 15 | 16 | 16 | 16 | 16 | 16 | 16 | 16 | 16 | 16 | 16 | 16 | 16 | 16 | 15 | 15 | 15 | 15 | 15 | 16 | 16 | 16 | 16 | 16 | 16 | 17 | 16 | 15 | 15 |
| CB Prat | 13 | 16 | 18 | 18 | 16 | 16 | 15 | 15 | 14 | 15 | 14 | 15 | 15 | 15 | 15 | 15 | 15 | 15 | 15 | 16 | 16 | 16 | 16 | 16 | 15 | 15 | 15 | 15 | 15 | 15 | 16 | 15 | 16 | 16 |
| Palmer Alma Mediterrànea | 15 | 17 | 16 | 15 | 17 | 17 | 17 | 17 | 17 | 17 | 18 | 18 | 18 | 18 | 18 | 17 | 17 | 17 | 17 | 17 | 17 | 17 | 17 | 17 | 17 | 17 | 17 | 17 | 17 | 17 | 15 | 17 | 17 | 17 |
| Levitec Huesca La Magia | 16 | 18 | 17 | 17 | 18 | 18 | 18 | 18 | 18 | 18 | 17 | 17 | 17 | 17 | 17 | 18 | 18 | 18 | 18 | 18 | 18 | 18 | 18 | 18 | 18 | 18 | 18 | 18 | 18 | 18 | 18 | 18 | 18 | 18 |

| Promotion to Liga ACB |
| Qualification to playoffs |
| Relegation to LEB Plata |

Source: FEB

=== Results ===
| Home \ Away | GBC | GIR | CAC | ALM | PRA | GRA | ALI | FLL | ISB | HUE | COR | MEL | MOV | PLM | CAS | VLL | OVI | PAL |
|---|---|---|---|---|---|---|---|---|---|---|---|---|---|---|---|---|---|---|
| Acunsa Gipuzkoa | — | 85–81 | 74–76 | 101–78 | 70–63 | 50–76 | 72–68 | 73–81 | 80–70 | 95–68 | 62–49 | 61–67 | 54–72 | 92–65 | 69–77 | 85–71 | 79–77 | 68–74 |
| Bàsquet Girona | 91–88 | — | 86–80 | 74–86 | 82–63 | 55–66 | 75–94 | 97–80 | 85–73 | 89–47 | 68–80 | 78–71 | 70–68 | 98–77 | 66–61 | 70–73 | 99–74 | 89–72 |
| Cáceres P. Humanidad | 68–67 | 62–59 | — | 95–89 | 70–64 | 88–86 | 78–65 | 79–88 | 79–69 | 90–83 | 78–74 | 79–75 | 62–71 | 102–97 | 77–68 | 86–80 | 75–99 | 70–87 |
| CB Almansa con Afanion | 76–105 | 87–93 | 93–69 | — | 75–90 | 75–82 | 72–73 | 78–90 | 89–73 | 87–80 | 83–79 | 89–70 | 68–84 | 80–87 | 94–65 | 76–80 | 72–83 | 75–96 |
| CB Prat | 70–81 | 85–89 | 72–80 | 85–88 | — | 64–68 | 89–77 | 72–82 | 96–78 | 96–60 | 83–79 | 97–81 | 80–79 | 78–98 | 84–88 | 68–75 | 62–91 | 72–76 |
| Covirán Granada | 71–75 | 83–72 | 80–86 | 102–60 | 89–75 | — | 67–53 | 94–84 | 84–68 | 101–70 | 79–88 | 98–70 | 69–58 | 78–62 | 86–66 | 89–75 | 96–68 | 93–57 |
| HLA Alicante | 87–91 | 67–75 | 89–58 | 95–94 | 73–63 | 78–83 | — | 84–82 | 87–70 | 84–61 | 66–79 | 75–78 | 75–98 | 97–89 | 87–71 | 57–78 | 96–97 | 71–72 |
| ICG Força Lleida | 96–84 | 86–65 | 95–84 | 76–77 | 89–80 | 78–69 | 69–67 | — | 69–81 | 100–81 | 84–83 | 83–73 | 81–75 | 89–82 | 80–71 | 75–71 | 67–56 | 82–81 |
| Juaristi ISB | 75–66 | 63–70 | 53–75 | 89–84 | 77–72 | 74–62 | 85–69 | 86–91 | — | 89–56 | 89–82 | 67–77 | 88–72 | 101–80 | 75–85 | 59–82 | 88–80 | 88–85 |
| Levitec Huesca La Magia | 85–68 | 50–85 | 61–68 | 72–83 | 80–89 | 60–71 | 70–85 | 86–84 | 74–89 | — | 75–86 | 92–100 | 49–83 | 83–65 | 93–94 | 82–89 | 73–68 | 73–103 |
| Leyma Coruña | 92–62 | 72–96 | 74–55 | 79–95 | 82–61 | 77–85 | 75–61 | 88–63 | 95–87 | 83–65 | — | 95–69 | 87–68 | 76–70 | 78–74 | 80–81 | 61–83 | 105–93 |
| Melilla Sport Capital | 71–79 | 92–68 | 75–67 | 69–84 | 77–71 | 89–77 | 79–93 | 74–60 | 84–67 | 62–74 | 72–80 | — | 63–76 | 82–89 | 58–75 | 60–79 | 79–78 | 88–75 |
| Movistar Estudiantes | 87–65 | 88–80 | 83–76 | 94–67 | 73–72 | 68–70 | 94–88 | 98–73 | 89–75 | 70–59 | 88–80 | 76–66 | — | 105–71 | 100–69 | 81–60 | 68–63 | 71–73 |
| Palmer Alma Mediterrànea | 85–67 | 78–73 | 87–92 | 82–94 | 73–76 | 77–87 | 79–90 | 98–90 | 81–65 | 86–61 | 91–88 | 61–69 | 70–73 | — | 70–71 | 74–83 | 74–69 | 82–86 |
| TAU Castelló | 92–93 | 72–67 | 104–84 | 81–66 | 78–80 | 69–73 | 69–73 | 95–98 | 92–83 | 85–62 | 80–85 | 92–91 | 66–78 | 103–98 | — | 83–77 | 82–74 | 84–82 |
| UEMC Real Valladolid | 89–99 | 57–77 | 92–75 | 84–70 | 71–95 | 78–82 | 83–82 | 78–64 | 86–77 | 82–69 | 78–100 | 68–72 | 62–66 | 71–64 | 82–77 | — | 81–73 | 69–78 |
| Unicaja Banco Oviedo | 89–76 | 46–80 | 87–75 | 85–63 | 77–65 | 80–76 | 54–77 | 89–85 | 79–73 | 91–73 | 67–60 | 81–79 | 67–75 | 68–53 | 70–85 | 88–71 | — | 79–74 |
| Zunder Palencia | 85–73 | 62–73 | 78–69 | 68–57 | 74–83 | 80–83 | 83–89 | 62–63 | 84–72 | 72–55 | 80–67 | 84–77 | 66–62 | 76–74 | 80–79 | 68–64 | 76–80 | — |

Source: FEB
Legend: Blue = home team win; Red = away team win.

== Playoffs ==
Quarter-finals
2 | Movistar Estudiantes | 64 | 73 | 54 | 85 | 3
9 | UEMC Real Valladolid | 60 | 58 | 67 | 59 | 1
5 | Zunder Palencia | 76 | 83 | 75 | 3
6 | Unicaja Banco Oviedo | 71 | 70 | 67 | 0
3 | ICG Força Lleida | 87 | 98 | 71 | 73 | 79 | 3
8 | Cáceres P. Humanidad | 79 | 75 | 86 | 79 | 70 | 2
4 | Bàsquet Girona | 74 | 92 | 85 | 3
7 | Leyma Coruña | 66 | 62 | 76 | 0

Semi-finals
2 | Movistar Estudiantes | 89
5 | Zunder Palencia | 62
3 | ICG Força Lleida | 68
4 | Bàsquet Girona | 77

Final
2 | Movistar Estudiantes | 60
4 | Bàsquet Girona | 66

Source: FEB

== Copa Princesa de Asturias ==
The Copa Princesa de Asturias was played by the two first qualified teams after the end of the first half of the season (round 17). The cup was scheduled originally on 11–12 February 2022 and was postponed to 3 April 2022 with the aim to extend the term for the dispute of the games postponed from first half of the season in response to the COVID-19 pandemic. The champion of the cup played the playoffs against the ninth qualified as it finished the league between the second and the fifth qualified.

=== Teams qualified ===
| Pos | Team | Pld | W | L | PF | PA | PD | Pts |
|---|---|---|---|---|---|---|---|---|
| 1 | Movistar Estudiantes (H) | 17 | 14 | 3 | 1323 | 1184 | +139 | 31 |
| 2 | Covirán Granada | 17 | 13 | 4 | 1381 | 1248 | +133 | 30 |

Source: FEB
(H) Hosts

=== Game ===
| 3 April 2022 | Movistar Estudiantes | 73–72 | Covirán Granada | Madrid |
| 12:30 | Scoring by quarter: 23–10, 21–16, 9–26, 20–20 |
| | Pts: Urtasun 14; Rebs: Martín 7 Asts: Urtasun 6 Eff: Urtasun 21 | Boxscore | Pts: Costa 15; Rebs: J. Diaz, Gatell 4 Asts: C. Díaz 6 Eff: Costa 18 | Arena: WiZink Center; Attendance: 9,432 |

== Final standings ==
| Pos | Team | Pld | W | L | Promotion or relegation |
|---|---|---|---|---|---|
| 1 | Covirán Granada (C, P) | 34 | 26 | 8 | Promotion to Liga ACB |
| 2 | Bàsquet Girona (P) | 39 | 26 | 13 | Promotion to Liga ACB |
| 3 | Movistar Estudiantes (X) | 40 | 29 | 11 | |
| 4 | ICG Força Lleida | 40 | 25 | 15 | |
| 5 | Zunder Palencia | 38 | 23 | 15 | |
| 6 | Unicaja Banco Oviedo | 37 | 19 | 18 | |
| 7 | Leyma Coruña | 37 | 19 | 18 | |
| 8 | Cáceres Patrimonio de la Humanidad | 39 | 21 | 18 | |
| 9 | UEMC Real Valladolid | 38 | 19 | 19 | |
| 10 | TAU Castelló | 34 | 17 | 17 | |
| 11 | Acunsa Gipuzkoa | 34 | 17 | 17 | |
| 12 | HLA Alicante | 34 | 16 | 18 | |
| 13 | Melilla Sport Capital | 34 | 14 | 20 | |
| 14 | CB Almansa con Afanion | 34 | 13 | 21 | |
| 15 | Juaristi ISB | 34 | 13 | 21 | |
| 16 | CB Prat (R) | 34 | 12 | 22 | Relegation to LEB Plata |
| 17 | Palmer Alma Mediterrànea Palma (R) | 34 | 10 | 24 | Relegation to LEB Plata |
| 18 | Levitec Huesca La Magia (R) | 34 | 5 | 29 | Relegation to LEB Plata |

Source: FEB
(C) Champions; (P) Promoted; (R) Relegated; (X) Champion of the Copa Princesa de Asturias

== Awards ==
All official awards of the 2021–22 LEB Oro season.

=== Final Four MVP ===
| Pos. | Player | Team |
|---|---|---|
| C | (Spain) Marc Gasol | Bàsquet Girona |

=== Copa Princesa de Asturias MVP ===
| Pos. | Player | Team |
|---|---|---|
| SG | (Spain) Álex Urtasun | Movistar Estudiantes |

=== Player of the round ===
==== Regular season ====
| Round | Player | Team | Eff. | Ref |
|---|---|---|---|---|
| 1 | (Spain) Pedro Llompart | HLA Alicante | 33 | |
| 2 | (United States) Nick Ward | Leyma Coruña | 32 | |
| 3 | (United States) Nick Ward (2) | Leyma Coruña | 31 | |
| 4 | (Argentina) Lucas Faggiano | Movistar Estudiantes | 29 | |
| 5 | (Venezuela) Michael Carrera | ICG Força Lleida | 35 | |
| 6 | (Dominican Republic) Eddy Polanco | CB Almansa con Afanion | 35 | |
| 7 | (Spain) Sergio de la Fuente | UEMC Real Valladolid | 40 | |
| 8 | (Montenegro) Nemanja Đurišić | Movistar Estudiantes | 30 | |
| 9 | (Spain) Lluís Costa | Covirán Granada | 39 | |
| 10 | (Spain) Marc Gasol | Bàsquet Girona | 39 | |
| 11 | (Venezuela) Michael Carrera (2) | ICG Força Lleida | 24 | |
| 11 | (United States) Nick Ward (3) | Leyma Coruña | 24 | |
| 12 | (Montenegro) Nemanja Đurišić (2) | Movistar Estudiantes | 33 | |
| 13 | (Netherlands) Kai Edwards | TAU Castelló | 33 | |
| 14 | (Spain) Sergi Costa | CB Prat | 28 | |
| 14 | (Netherlands) Joey van Zegeren | HLA Alicante | 28 | |
| 15 | (United States) Nick Ward (4) | Leyma Coruña | 35 | |
| 16 | (Spain) Marc Gasol (2) | Bàsquet Girona | 39 | |
| 17 | (Dominican Republic) Eddy Polanco (2) | CB Almansa con Afanion | 42 | |
| 18 | (Spain) Xavi Rey | Levitec Huesca la Magia | 34 | |
| 19 | (United States) T.J. Crockett | CB Prat | 34 | |
| 20 | (Senegal) Moustapha Barro | Zunder Palencia | 26 | |
| 21 | (United States) Alec Wintering | UEMC Real Valladolid | 33 | |
| 22 | (Nigeria) Zaid Hearst | HLA Alicante | 37 | |
| 23 | (United States) Sean McDonnell | Unicaja Banco Oviedo | 27 | |
| 24 | (Venezuela) Michael Carrera (3) | ICG Força Lleida | 43 | |
| 25 | (United States) T.J. Crockett (2) | CB Prat | 26 | |
| 26 | (United States) Elijah Brown | Palmer Alma Mediterránea Palma | 29 | |
| 27 | (Dominican Republic) Eddy Polanco (3) | CB Almansa con Afanion | 26 | |
| 27 | (United States) Wesley Van Beck | Palmer Alma Mediterránea Palma | 26 | |
| 28 | (Spain) Marc Gasol (3) | Bàsquet Girona | 31 | |
| 29 | (Spain) Marc Gasol (4) | Bàsquet Girona | 38 | |
| 30 | (United States) Alec Wintering (2) | UEMC Real Valladolid | 31 | |
| 31 | (United Kingdom) Morayo Soluade | Leyma Coruña | 30 | |
| 32 | (Slovakia) Tomáš Pavelka | Palmer Alma Mediterránea Palma | 32 | |
| 33 | (Nigeria) Zaid Hearst (2) | HLA Alicante | 40 | |
| 34 | (Dominican Republic) Eddy Polanco (4) | CB Almansa con Afanion | 33 | |

==== Quarter-finals ====
| Round | Player | Team | Eff. | Ref |
|---|---|---|---|---|
| 1st leg | (Ghana) Prince Ali | Zunder Palencia | 21 | |
| 1st leg | (United States) Mark Hughes | ICG Força Lleida | 21 | |
| 2nd leg | (Argentina) Juani Marcos | ICG Força Lleida | 31 | |
| 3rd leg | (Spain) Marc Gasol (5) | Bàsquet Girona | 30 | |
| 4th leg | (Argentina) Juani Marcos (2) | ICG Força Lleida | 29 | |
| 5th leg | (The Bahamas) Shaquille Cleare | ICG Força Lleida | 20 | |
