= 2020–21 LEB Oro season =

LEB Oro
- Season: 2020–21
- Games played: 272
- Teams: 19

Regular season
- Promoted: Río Breogán
- Relegated: Ibereólica Renovables Ourense; ICG Força Lleida; Tizona Universidad de Burgos; ZTE Real Canoe NC

Finals
- Champions: Río Breogán (3rd title)

Records
- Biggest home win: Huesca 103–64 Ourense (9 May 2021)
- Biggest away win: Murcia 58–86 Castelló (17 October 2020); Tizona 50–78 Coruña (10 November 2020)
- Highest scoring: Melilla 113–106 Real Canoe (30 April 2021)

The 2020–21 LEB Oro season was the 25th season of the Spanish basketball second league. It started on 16 October 2020 with the first round of the regular season and ended on 20 June 2021 with the final.

It was the following season after the 2019–20 season was curtailed in response to the COVID-19 pandemic. Consequently, there were not relegations to LEB Plata and the league was expanded to 19 teams, record of the league, which was divided into two groups for the first time in its history. On August 27, 2020, FEB and acb agreed a support plan for the league and intended to alleviate the effects of COVID-19 pandemic, as well as to guarantee the broadcast of all the matches of the league. The total of these grants, therefore, amounted to one million euros, which were distributed evenly among the clubs registered in the league for the 2020–21 season. On March 1, 2021, the start of the second phase was postponed one week due to the impossibility of playing all the matches of the first phase before March 7 in response to the COVID-19 outbreak that emerged in ICG Força Lleida which affected eight team members.

== Format changes ==
For this season, the league consisted of two group phases with two groups of 9 and 10 teams in each phase. At the end of the first phase, the top five teams of each group joined the promotion group and the rest of the teams joined the relegation group. In the second phase, the results of the teams that played in the first phase swept to the second phase avoiding to play four times with the same team. At the end of the second phase, the seven top teams of the promotion group and the top team of the relegation group qualified for the playoffs and the last four teams of the relegation group were relegated to LEB Plata. For the playoffs, all rounds were played in a best-of-three series to decide the only promotion to Liga ACB.

== Teams ==
=== Promotion and relegation (pre-season) ===
A total of 19 teams contested the league, including 16 sides from the 2019–20 season and three promoted from the 2019–20 LEB Plata. On July 21, 2020, Marín Ence PeixeGalego did not register in the league.

Teams promoted from LEB Plata

- Real Murcia
- Bàsquet Girona
- Tizona Universidad de Burgos

=== Venues and locations ===
Location of teams in 2020–21 LEB Oro
Red: Group A; Green: Group B.

Team	Home city	Arena	Capacity
Bàsquet Girona	Girona	Fontajau	5,500
Cáceres Patrimonio de la Humanidad	Cáceres	Multiusos Ciudad de Cáceres	6,500
CB Almansa con Afanion	Almansa	Municipal	1,500
Clínica Sur-Aspasia RVB	Valladolid	Pisuerga	6,800
Covirán Granada	Granada	Palacio de Deportes	7,242
Destino Palencia	Palencia	Pabellón Municipal	5,000
HLA Alicante	Alicante	Pedro Ferrándiz	5,700
Ibereólica Renovables Ourense	Ourense	Pazo Paco Paz	5,500
ICG Força Lleida	Lleida	Pavelló Barris Nord	6,100
Levitec Huesca	Huesca	Palacio Municipal de Huesca	4,900
Leyma Coruña	A Coruña	Pazo dos Deportes de Riazor	5,000
Liberbank Oviedo	Oviedo	Polideportivo de Pumarín	1,138
Melilla Sport Capital	Melilla	Pabellón Javier Imbroda Ortiz	3,800
Palmer Alma Mediterrànea Palma	Palma	Son Moix	3,800
Real Murcia	Murcia	Príncipe de Asturias	3,500
Río Breogán	Lugo	Pazo dos Deportes	6,500
TAU Castelló	Castellón	Pabellón Ciutat de Castelló	6,000
Tizona Universidad de Burgos	Burgos	Polideportivo El Plantío	2,432
ZTE Real Canoe NC	Madrid	Polideportivo Pez Volador	800

=== Personnel and sponsorship ===
Team	Head coach	Kit manufacturer	Shirt sponsor
Bàsquet Girona	Carles Marco	Nike	
Cáceres Patrimonio de la Humanidad	Roberto Blanco	Besten 10	Extremadura
CB Almansa con Afanion	Rubén Perelló	Besten 10	Albaluz
Clínica Sur-Aspasia RVB	Hugo López	Kappa	Grupo Aspasia, Clínica Sur
Covirán Granada	Pablo Pin	Vive	Supermercados Covirán
Destino Palencia	Arturo Álvarez	Kappa	Palencia
HLA Alicante	Pedro Rivero	Score Tech	Grupo Hospitalario HLA
Ibereólica Renovables Ourense	Gonzalo García de Vitoria	34ers	Grupo Ibereólica Renovables
ICG Força Lleida	Gustavo Aranzana	Joma	ICG Software
Levitec Huesca	Óscar Lata	Barri-Ball	Levitec, Aragon
Leyma Coruña	Sergio García	Wibo	Leche Leyma, Galega 100%
Liberbank Oviedo	Natxo Lezkano	Spalding	Liberbank
Melilla Sport Capital	Alejandro Alcoba	Pentex	Melilla Sport Capital
Palmer Alma Mediterrànea Palma	Pau Tomàs	Pentex	Palmer Inmobiliaria
Palmer Alma Mediterrànea Palma	Álex Pérez	Pentex	Palmer Inmobiliaria
Real Murcia	Rafa Monclova	Vive	Terra Training
Río Breogán	Diego Epifanio	Wibo	Estrella Galicia 0,0
TAU Castelló	Toni Ten	Score Tech	TAU Cerámica
Tizona Universidad de Burgos	Lluís Riera	Luanvi	Ford Autocid
ZTE Real Canoe NC	José Rey	Spalding	ZTE

=== Managerial changes ===
Team	Outgoing manager	Manner of departure	Date of vacancy	Position in table	Replaced with	Date of appointment
Levitec Huesca	Guillermo Arenas	End of contract	15 May 2020	Pre-season	David Gómez	16 July 2020
Bàsquet Girona	Àlex Formento	Sacked	7 June 2020	Pre-season	Carles Marco	11 June 2020
Palmer Alma Mediterrànea Palma	Félix Alonso	End of contract	8 June 2020	Pre-season	Pau Tomàs	8 June 2020
Palmer Alma Mediterrànea Palma	Félix Alonso	End of contract	8 June 2020	Pre-season	Álex Pérez	8 June 2020
Destino Palencia	Carles Marco	Signed for Bàsquet Girona	11 June 2020	Pre-season	Arturo Álvarez	15 July 2020
ZTE Real Canoe NC	Miguel Ángel Aranzábal	End as head coach	16 July 2020	Pre-season	José Rey	16 July 2020
Tizona Universidad de Burgos	Jorge Elorduy	Sacked	28 November 2020	9th of Group A (1–3)	Lluís Riera	29 November 2020
Levitec Huesca	David Gómez	Sacked	25 January 2021	8th of Group B (3–10)	Óscar Lata	1 February 2020

== First phase ==
=== Group A ===
==== League table ====
Pos	Team	Pld	W	L	PF	PA	PD	Pts	Qualification
1	Río Breogán	16	13	3	1259	1122	+137	29	Qualification to promotion group
2	Leyma Coruña	16	11	5	1213	1111	+102	27	Qualification to promotion group
3	Liberbank Oviedo	16	10	6	1269	1231	+38	26	Qualification to promotion group
4	Clínica Sur-Aspasia RVB	16	9	7	1322	1290	+32	25	Qualification to promotion group
5	Destino Palencia	16	8	8	1178	1142	+36	24	Qualification to promotion group
6	Ibereólica Renovables Ourense	16	6	10	1195	1249	−54	22	Qualification to relegation group
7	Cáceres Patrimonio de la Humanidad	16	5	11	1149	1248	−99	21	Qualification to relegation group
8	Melilla Sport Capital	16	5	11	1196	1272	−76	21	Qualification to relegation group
9	Tizona Universidad de Burgos	16	5	11	1251	1367	−116	21	Qualification to relegation group

Source: FEB

==== Positions by round ====
The table lists the positions of teams after completion of each round. In order to preserve chronological evolvements, any postponed matches are not included in the round at which they are originally scheduled, but added to the full round they are played immediately afterwards.

Team ╲ Round	1	2	3	4	5	6	7	8	9	10	11	12	13	14	15	16	17	18
Río Breogán	2	4	7	7	8	1	1	1	1	1	1	1	1	1	1	1	1	1
Leyma Coruña	8	7	8	8	6	3	2	2	2	3	2	2	2	2	2	2	2	2
Liberbank Oviedo	5	8	5	3	7	9	6	4	4	5	5	6	5	5	4	5	4	3
Clínica Sur-Aspasia RVB	3	1	1	1	1	2	3	3	3	2	3	3	4	3	5	4	3	4
Destino Palencia	1	2	3	2	3	6	4	5	5	4	4	4	3	4	3	3	5	5
Ibereólica Renov. Ourense	4	3	4	5	2	4	5	7	8	8	8	5	8	7	7	6	8	6
Cáceres P. Humanidad	9	5	2	4	4	7	8	6	7	9	9	9	9	9	9	7	6	7
Melilla Sport Capital	6	6	6	6	5	5	7	8	6	6	6	7	6	6	6	8	7	8
Tizona Univ. Burgos	7	9	9	9	9	8	9	9	9	7	7	8	7	8	8	9	9	9

Qualification to promotion group
Qualification to relegation group

Source: FEB

==== Results ====
Home \ Away	CAC	VLL	PAL	COB	COR	OVI	MEL	BRE	TIZ
Cáceres P. Humanidad	—	80–93	60–72	75–66	71–78	88–72	82–80	78–91	89–77
Clínica Sur-Aspasia RVB	73–67	—	73–66	89–87	67–78	102–84	89–84	70–80	100–108
Destino Palencia	76–65	72–67	—	87–69	66–76	78–81	81–50	65–76	71–85
Ibereólica Renov. Ourense	73–67	78–88	75–68	—	71–88	69–82	70–66	77–71	89–70
Leyma Coruña	68–46	67–80	66–64	86–75	—	62–60	93–71	60–68	83–88
Liberbank Oviedo	98–67	83–78	78–79	83–75	88–83	—	82–76	64–78	90–73
Melilla Sport Capital	74–75	77–80	58–71	81–70	78–75	72–80	—	74–67	93–88
Río Breogán	76–63	87–82	84–76	79–71	68–72	80–66	81–72	—	90–53
Tizona Univ. Burgos	81–76	92–91	79–86	69–80	50–78	71–78	88–90	79–83	—

Source: FEB
Legend: Blue = home team win; Red = away team win.

=== Group B ===
==== League table ====
Pos	Team	Pld	W	L	PF	PA	PD	Pts	Qualification
1	TAU Castelló	18	14	4	1437	1337	+100	32	Qualification to promotion group
2	Covirán Granada	18	12	6	1413	1314	+99	30	Qualification to promotion group
3	Palmer Alma Mediterrànea Palma	18	11	7	1417	1395	+22	29	Qualification to promotion group
4	HLA Alicante	18	11	7	1436	1364	+72	29	Qualification to promotion group
5	CB Almansa con Afanion	18	10	8	1390	1354	+36	28	Qualification to promotion group
6	Bàsquet Girona	18	9	9	1404	1386	+18	27	Qualification to relegation group
7	ICG Força Lleida	18	9	9	1369	1366	+3	27	Qualification to relegation group
8	Real Murcia	18	6	12	1283	1349	−66	24	Qualification to relegation group
9	Levitec Huesca	18	5	13	1259	1371	−112	23	Qualification to relegation group
10	ZTE Real Canoe NC	18	3	15	1294	1466	−172	21	Qualification to relegation group

Source: FEB

==== Positions by round ====
The table lists the positions of teams after completion of each round. In order to preserve chronological evolvements, any postponed matches are not included in the round at which they are originally scheduled, but added to the full round they are played immediately afterwards.

Team ╲ Round	1	2	3	4	5	6	7	8	9	10	11	12	13	14	15	16	17	18
TAU Castelló	1	1	1	3	3	3	3	3	2	2	1	1	1	2	2	1	1	1
Covirán Granada	2	2	3	2	2	2	1	2	3	3	3	3	5	5	7	3	2	2
Palmer Alma Mediterrànea	8	8	9	6	8	10	9	7	7	5	5	4	3	4	3	4	4	3
HLA Alicante	4	3	2	1	1	1	2	1	1	1	2	2	2	1	1	2	3	4
CB Almansa con Afanion	5	6	7	4	4	4	4	4	4	4	4	5	4	6	4	5	5	5
Bàsquet Girona	7	4	5	7	9	8	7	8	9	9	9	9	6	8	5	7	6	6
ICG Força Lleida	6	9	6	8	5	6	6	5	6	6	7	8	7	3	6	6	7	7
Real Murcia	10	5	4	5	6	5	5	6	5	7	6	6	9	9	9	8	8	8
Levitec Huesca	9	10	10	9	7	7	8	9	8	8	8	7	8	7	8	9	9	9
ZTE Real Canoe	3	7	8	10	10	9	10	10	10	10	10	10	10	10	10	10	10	10

Qualification to promotion group
Qualification to relegation group

Source: FEB

==== Results ====
Home \ Away	GIR	ALM	GRA	ALI	FLL	HUE	PLM	MUR	CAS	CAN
Bàsquet Girona	—	78–89	81–66	77–83	86–70	67–50	80–83	75–63	72–74	87–62
CB Almansa con Afanion	84–55	—	64–89	93–99	80–71	83–80	64–75	86–79	52–66	74–69
Covirán Granada	83–60	77–76	—	84–77	80–83	89–75	63–70	73–67	62–63	77–70
HLA Alicante	74–62	79–76	67–70	—	82–65	84–50	96–89	81–105	81–87	82–77
ICG Força Lleida	89–111	62–67	83–79	67–87	—	67–63	91–78	78–55	72–74	81–65
Levitec Huesca	90–84	71–83	71–78	76–64	87–86	—	66–73	69–82	69–76	63–53
Palmer Alma Mediterrànea	78–81	73–97	66–69	80–69	82–71	68–61	—	77–72	73–79	100–99
Real Murcia	93–87	65–63	68–80	65–71	57–66	68–65	63–68	—	58–86	76–67
TAU Castelló	82–84	87–72	105–100	62–85	65–74	91–69	83–101	88–83	—	92–63
ZTE Real Canoe	73–77	79–87	68–94	79–75	68–93	75–84	91–83	69–64	67–77	—

Source: FEB
Legend: Blue = home team win; Red = away team win.

== Second phase ==
=== Promotion group ===
==== League table ====
Pos	Team	Pld	W	L	PF	PA	PD	Pts	Qualification
1	Covirán Granada	18	13	5	1410	1347	+63	31	Qualification to playoffs
2	Río Breogán	18	13	5	1420	1341	+79	31	Qualification to playoffs
3	TAU Castelló	18	12	6	1461	1408	+53	30	Qualification to playoffs
4	Leyma Coruña	18	12	6	1348	1306	+42	30	Qualification to playoffs
5	Liberbank Oviedo	18	9	9	1409	1420	−11	27	Qualification to playoffs
6	HLA Alicante	18	9	9	1437	1371	+66	27	Qualification to playoffs
7	Palmer Alma Mediterrànea Palma	18	8	10	1372	1450	−78	26	Qualification to playoffs
8	Clínica Sur-Aspasia RVB	18	7	11	1449	1475	−26	25	
9	Destino Palencia	18	4	14	1277	1362	−85	22	
10	CB Almansa con Afanion	18	3	15	1370	1473	−103	21	

Source: FEB

==== Positions by round ====
The table lists the positions of teams after completion of each round. In order to preserve chronological evolvements, any postponed matches are not included in the round at which they are originally scheduled, but added to the full round they are played immediately afterwards.

Team ╲ Round	S	1	2	3	4	5	6	7	8	9	10
Covirán Granada	3	4	3	3	2	2	3	3	3	2	1
Río Breogán	1	1	1	1	1	1	1	1	1	3	2
TAU Castelló	2	3	2	2	3	4	5	4	4	4	3
Leyma Coruña	4	2	4	6	6	5	2	2	2	1	4
Liberbank Oviedo	8	8	6	5	5	6	6	5	5	5	5
HLA Alicante	6	5	5	4	4	3	4	6	6	6	6
Palmer Alma Mediterrànea	5	7	8	8	7	7	7	7	7	7	7
Clínica Sur-Aspasia RVB	7	6	7	7	8	8	8	8	8	8	8
Destino Palencia	9	9	9	9	9	9	10	10	10	10	9
CB Almansa con Afanion	10	10	10	10	10	10	9	9	9	9	10

Qualification to playoffs

Source: FEB

==== Results ====
Home \ Away	ALM	VLL	GRA	PAL	ALI	COR	OVI	PLM	BRE	CAS
CB Almansa con Afanion	—	78–91	—	82–78	—	73–80	83–84	—	68–81	—
Clínica Sur-Aspasia RVB	86–79	—	86–87	—	85–70	—	—	85–73	—	83–88
Covirán Granada	—	90–85	—	77–59	—	74–65	72–68	—	97–80	—
Destino Palencia	62–72	—	71–72	—	76–66	—	—	73–77	—	76–75
HLA Alicante	—	108–69	—	84–73	—	85–60	84–85	—	76–66	—
Leyma Coruña	89–73	—	82–66	—	71–64	—	—	94–76	—	90–92
Liberbank Oviedo	92–87	—	78–83	—	63–62	—	—	105–67	—	91–77
Palmer Alma Mediterrànea	—	98–81	—	69–67	—	65–75	80–77	—	74–76	—
Río Breogán	85–81	—	85–78	—	82–85	—	—	97–66	—	77–75
TAU Castelló	—	87–79	—	87–76	—	77–78	85–62	—	86–70	—

Source: FEB
Legend: Blue = home team win; Red = away team win.

=== Relegation group ===
==== League table ====
Pos	Team	Pld	W	L	PF	PA	PD	Pts	Qualification or relegation
1	Real Murcia	16	10	6	1187	1135	+52	26	Qualification to playoffs
2	Cáceres Patrimonio de la Humanidad	16	10	6	1224	1195	+29	26	
3	Levitec Huesca	16	9	7	1252	1189	+63	25	
4	Bàsquet Girona	16	9	7	1301	1197	+104	25	
5	Melilla Sport Capital	16	9	7	1266	1266	0	25	
6	Ibereólica Renovables Ourense	16	9	7	1215	1236	−21	25	Relegation to LEB Plata
7	ICG Força Lleida	16	8	8	1251	1230	+21	24	Relegation to LEB Plata
8	Tizona Universidad de Burgos	16	5	11	1267	1356	−89	21	Relegation to LEB Plata
9	ZTE Real Canoe NC	16	3	13	1158	1317	−159	19	Relegation to LEB Plata

Source: FEB

==== Positions by round ====
The table lists the positions of teams after completion of each round. In order to preserve chronological evolvements, any postponed matches are not included in the round at which they are originally scheduled, but added to the full round they are played immediately afterwards.

Team ╲ Round	S	1	2	3	4	5	6	7	8	9	10
Real Murcia	3	4	3	3	4	5	4	1	3	6	1
Cáceres P. Humanidad	5	6	6	6	5	4	2	2	1	2	2
Levitec Huesca	4	3	7	7	6	6	7	4	2	1	3
Bàsquet Girona	1	1	1	1	1	1	1	3	5	3	4
Melilla Sport Capital	7	7	4	4	2	3	5	6	4	5	5
Ibereólica Renov. Ourense	6	5	5	5	7	7	6	7	7	7	6
ICG Força Lleida	2	2	2	2	3	2	3	5	6	4	7
Tizona Univ. Burgos	9	9	9	9	8	8	8	8	8	8	8
ZTE Real Canoe	8	8	8	8	9	9	9	9	9	9	9

Qualification to playoffs
Relegation to LEB Plata

Source: FEB

==== Results ====
Home \ Away	GIR	CAC	COB	FLL	MEL	HUE	MUR	TIZ	CAN
Bàsquet Girona	—	74–75	81–69	—	77–63	—	—	93–73	—
Cáceres P. Humanidad	73–61	—	—	88–70	—	92–86	74–68	—	81–80
Ibereólica Renov. Ourense	73–71	—	—	88–77	—	65–91	77–78	—	88–74
ICG Força Lleida	—	72–70	74–76	—	95–81	—	—	91–77	—
Melilla Sport Capital	95–93	—	—	67–61	—	85–78	61–67	—	113–106
Levitec Huesca	—	80–73	103–64	—	81–70	—	—	87–76	—
Real Murcia	—	80–64	81–69	—	65–68	—	—	102–71	—
Tizona Univ. Burgos	78–69	—	—	91–81	—	82–75	75–88	—	89–63
ZTE Real Canoe	—	73–70	70–90	—	70–79	—	—	90–82	—

Source: FEB
Legend: Blue = home team win; Red = away team win.

== Playoffs ==
Quarter-finals
P–1	Covirán Granada	73	62	101	2
R–1	Real Murcia	69	69	95	1
P–4	Leyma Coruña	74	70	2
P–5	Liberbank Oviedo	66	69	0
P–2	Río Breogán	87	81	80	2
P–7	Palmer Alma Mediterrànea	72	88	68	1
P–3	TAU Castelló	78	66	70	1
P–6	HLA Alicante	70	71	78	2

Semi-finals
P–1	Covirán Granada	67	85	72	2
P–4	Leyma Coruña	77	82	68	1
P–2	Río Breogán	88	66	87	2
P–6	HLA Alicante	87	77	77	1

Final
P–1	Covirán Granada	67	78	57	1
P–2	Río Breogán	53	81	83	2

Source: FEB

== Copa Princesa de Asturias ==
The Copa Princesa de Asturias was played on 22 January 2021, by the top team of each group after the end of the first half of the season (round 9 of first phase).

=== Teams qualified ===
Pos	Grp	Team	Pld	W	L	PF	PA	PD	Pts
1	A	Río Breogán (H)	8	7	1	621	532	+89	15
1	B	HLA Alicante	9	8	1	749	648	+101	17

Source: FEB
(H) Hosts

=== Game ===
22 January 2021	Río Breogán	85–74(OT)	HLA Alicante	Lugo
19:30	Scoring by quarter: 24–18, 15–15, 15–22, 15–14, Overtime: 16–5
	Pts: Kačinas 20; Rebs: Cruz 7 Asts: Sollazzo 3 Eff: Kačinas 25	Boxscore	Pts: Bergstedt, Urtasun 13; Rebs: Ortega 9 Asts: Llompart 3 Eff: Bergstedt 13	Arena: Pazo dos Deportes; Attendance: 250; Referees: Francisco José Zafra, Guillermo Ríos, Eric Carrera

== Final standings ==
Pos	Team	Pld	W	L	Promotion or relegation
1	Río Breogán (C, P, X)	35	25	10	Promotion to Liga ACB
2	Covirán Granada	37	25	12	
3	Leyma Coruña	31	21	10	
4	HLA Alicante	34	19	15	
5	TAU Castelló	31	21	10	
6	Liberbank Oviedo	28	16	12	
7	Palmer Alma Mediterrànea Palma	31	16	15	
8	Real Murcia	29	13	16	
9	Clínica Sur-Aspasia RVB	26	13	13	
10	Destino Palencia	26	10	16	
11	CB Almansa con Afanion	28	12	16	
12	Cáceres Patrimonio de la Humanidad	26	11	15	
13	Levitec Huesca	26	10	16	
14	Bàsquet Girona	26	12	14	
15	Melilla Sport Capital	26	11	15	
16	Ibereólica Renovables Ourense (R)	26	11	15	Relegation to LEB Plata
17	ICG Força Lleida (R)	26	12	14	Relegation to LEB Plata
18	Tizona Universidad de Burgos (R)	26	9	17	Relegation to LEB Plata
19	ZTE Real Canoe NC (R)	26	5	21	Relegation to LEB Plata

Source: FEB
(C) Champions; (P) Promoted; (R) Relegated; (X) Champion of the Copa Princesa de Asturias

== Awards ==
All official awards of the 2020–21 LEB Oro season.

=== Copa Princesa de Asturias MVP ===
Pos.	Player	Team
PF	(Lithuania) Mindaugas Kačinas	Río Breogán

=== Player of the round ===
==== First phase ====
Round	Player	Team	Eff.	Ref
1	(United States) Justin Pitts	HLA Alicante	27	
2	(Spain) Jacobo Díaz	Palmer Alma Mediterrànea Palma	29	
3	(Spain) Pedro Llompart	HLA Alicante	26	
3	(United States) Elijah Brown	Liberbank Oviedo	26	
3	(Denmark) Jonas Bergstedt	HLA Alicante	26	
4	(Spain) Luis Parejo	Levitec Huesca	34	
5	(Norway) Karamo Jawara	Palmer Alma Mediterrànea Palma	33	
6	(Spain) Lluís Costa	Covirán Granada	35	
7	(Cameroon) Adala Moto	TAU Castelló	23	
8	(Netherlands) Joey van Zegeren	Clínica Sur-Aspasia RVB	39	
9	(Norway) Karamo Jawara (2)	Palmer Alma Mediterrànea Palma	29	
10	(England) Daniel Clark	ZTE Real Canoe NC	33	
11	(Spain) Iván Cruz	Río Breogán	33	
12	(Spain) Sergio Mendiola	CB Almansa con Afanion	29	
13	(Spain) Juan José García	TAU Castelló	36	
14	(United States) Ronnie Harrell	Palmer Alma Mediterrànea Palma	30	
15	(United States) Adam Sollazzo	Río Breogán	29	
15	(Latvia) Dāvis Rozītis	Bàsquet Girona	29	
16	(United States) Reed Timmer	Clínica Sur-Aspasia RVB	32	
17	(United States) Jaron Martin	Real Murcia	36	
18	(Serbia) Filip Djuran	CB Almansa con Afanion	29	

==== Second phase ====
Round	Player	Team	Eff.	Ref
1	(Serbia) Filip Djuran (2)	CB Almansa con Afanion	30	
2	(Latvia) Andris Misters	Melilla Sport Capital	39	
5	(Spain) Álex Hernández	Real Murcia	38	
6	(Spain) Ayoze Alonso	Tizona Universidad de Burgos	45	
7	(Spain) Nacho Martín	Clínica Sur-Aspasia RVB	30	
8	(United States) Alec Wintering	Melilla Sport Capital	38	
9	(United States) Reed Timmer (2)	Clínica Sur-Aspasia RVB	31	
10	(Dominican Republic) Dagoberto Peña	Leyma Coruña	33	

==== Quarter-finals ====
Round	Player	Team	Eff.	Ref
1st leg	(United States) Thomas Bropleh	Covirán Granada	26	
2nd leg	(Estonia) Kristian Kullamäe	Palmer Alma Mediterrànea Palma	26	
2nd leg	(United States) Ronnie Harrell (2)	Palmer Alma Mediterrànea Palma	26	
3rd leg	(Spain) Lluís Costa (2)	Covirán Granada	25	
3rd leg	(United States) Jaron Martin	Real Murcia	25	
3rd leg	(Finland) Alex Murphy	Covirán Granada	25	

==== Semi-finals ====
Round	Player	Team	Eff.	Ref
1st leg	(North Macedonia) Stojan Gjuroski	HLA Alicante	27	
2nd leg	(United States) Thomas Bropleh (2)	Covirán Granada	23	
3rd leg	(Denmark) Kevin Larsen	Río Breogán	26	

==== Final ====
Round	Player	Team	Eff.	Ref
1st leg	(United States) Thomas Bropleh (3)	Covirán Granada	22	
2nd leg	(United States) Thomas Bropleh (4)	Covirán Granada	26	
3rd leg	(United States) Adam Sollazzo (2)	Río Breogán	21	
