= 2026–27 ACB season =

Spanish professional basketball season

Liga Endesa^{1}
- Season: 2026–27
- Matches played: 81
- Teams: 18

Records
- Biggest home win: Baskonia 118–78 Girona (4 October 2026)
- Biggest away win: Lleida 86–122 Real Madrid (25 October 2026)
- Highest scoring: Valencia 129–111 Breogán (22 November 2026)
- Winning streak: Real Madrid (9 matches)
- Losing streak: iLERNA Lleida (8 matches)
- All statistics correct as of 22 November 2026.^{1} Sponsored league name, referring to Endesa.

The 2026–27 ACB season, also known as Liga Endesa for sponsorship reasons, is the 44th season of the top Spanish professional basketball league, since its establishment in 1983. It started on 26 September 2026 with the regular season and will end at the latest on 29 June 2027 with the finals.

Valencia Basket are the defending champions.

== Teams ==
=== Promotion and relegation (pre-season) ===
A total of 18 teams contest the league, including 16 sides from the 2025–26 season and two promoted from the 2025–26 Primera FEB. This include the top team from the Primera FEB, and the winners of the Primera FEB Final Four.

On 8 May 2026, Monbus Obradoiro became the first team to clinch the promotion to ACB after an 85–68 win to Inveready Gipuzkoa at the last round of the regular season. It will be the 15th season of the team from Santiago de Compostela after two years since their previous spells in the 2009–10 season and between 2011 and 2024 in the Spanish top tier. On 7 June 2026, Leyma Coruña became the second team to secure promotion to the ACB. They clinched the final spot by defeating Movistar Estudiantes 100–97 in overtime during the Primera FEB Final Four, completing a historic comeback to seal the victory. It will be the second season of the team from the city of A Coruña after their debut season in the 2024–25 season in the Spanish top league.

The first team to be relegated from ACB was Coviran Granada, after a 98–101 loss to Barça on 13 May 2026, with three rounds before the end of the regular season after four years since their debut in the top tier in the 2022–23 season. The second team to be relegated to Primera FEB was Dreamland Gran Canaria, after an 81–105 loss against Valencia Basket and the dramatic buzzer-beater three-pointer in the last seconds that served to Casademont Zaragoza to achieve the win and avoid relegation in the last round on 29 May 2026, ending their 31-year stay for the Canarian team in the top flight since the 1995–96 season in a successful era in which they achieved the EuroCup just three years earlier in 2023.

▲ Promoted from Primera FEB	▼ Relegated to Primera FEB
Monbus Obradoiro; Leyma Coruña	Dreamland Gran Canaria; Coviran Granada

=== Venues and locations ===
Location of teams in 2026–27 ACB

Team	Home city	Arena	Capacity
Asisa Joventut	Badalona	Palau Municipal d'Esports	12,760
Barça	Barcelona	Palau Blaugrana	7,786
Casademont Zaragoza	Zaragoza	Pabellón Príncipe Felipe	10,744
FIATC Girona	Girona	Fontajau	5,500
iLERNA Lleida	Lleida	Espai Fruita Barris Nord	6,100
Kids&Us Manresa	Manresa	Nou Congost	5,000
Kosner Baskonia	Vitoria-Gasteiz	Buesa Arena	15,504
La Laguna Tenerife	San Cristóbal de La Laguna	Santiago Martín	5,100
Leyma Coruña	A Coruña	Coliseum da Coruña	9,300
Monbus Obradoiro	Santiago de Compostela	Multiusos Fontes do Sar	6,000
MoraBanc Andorra	Andorra la Vella	Pavelló Toni Martí	5,001
Real Madrid	Madrid	Movistar Arena	13,109
Recoletas Salud San Pablo Burgos	Burgos	Coliseum Burgos	9,604
Río Breogán	Lugo	Pazo dos Deportes	5,310
Surne Bilbao	Bilbao	Bilbao Arena	10,014
UCAM Murcia	Murcia	Palacio de Deportes	7,454
Unicaja	Málaga	Martín Carpena	10,699
Valencia Basket	Valencia	Roig Arena	15,600

=== Personnel and kits ===
Team	Head coach	Captain	Kit manufacturer	Shirt sponsor (chest)
Asisa Joventut	(Spanish Basketball Federation) Dani Miret	(Croatia) Ante Tomić	Joma	Asisa
Barça	(Basketball Federation of Slovenia) Aleksander Sekulić	(United States) Kevin Punter	Nike	Assistència Sanitària
Casademont Zaragoza	(Spanish Basketball Federation) Gonzalo García de Vitoria	(Spain) Guillem Vives	Mercury	Casademont
FIATC Girona	(Spanish Basketball Federation) Moncho Fernández	(Spain) Sergi Martínez	Puma	FIATC
iLERNA Lleida	(Spanish Basketball Federation) Gerard Encuentra	(Spain) Oriol Paulí	Pentex	iLERNA
Kids&Us Manresa	(Spanish Basketball Federation) Diego Ocampo	(Spain) Pierre Oriola	Turion	Kids&Us
Kosner Baskonia	(Croatian Basketball Federation) Velimir Perasović	(Lithuania) Tadas Sedekerskis	Macron	Kingroyal Media, Kosner
La Laguna Tenerife	(Basketball Federation of Slovenia) Jaka Lakovič	(Brazil) Marcelo Huertas	Austral	La Laguna, Tenerife
Leyma Coruña	(Spanish Basketball Federation) Carles Marco	(Spain) Guillem Jou	BordiSport	Estrella Galicia 0,0
Monbus Obradoiro	(Spanish Basketball Federation) Diego Epifanio	(Spain) Sergi Quintela	Geff	Estrella Galicia 0,0
MoraBanc Andorra	(Croatian Basketball Federation) Žan Tabak	(Brazil) Rafa Luz	Kappa	MoraBanc, Andorra
Real Madrid	(Spanish Basketball Federation) Pedro Martínez	(Spain) Sergio Llull	Adidas	Emirates
Recoletas Salud San Pablo Burgos	(Spanish Basketball Federation) Porfirio Fisac	(Spain) Dani Díez	Hummel	Inmobiliaria San Pablo, Burgos
Río Breogán	(Spanish Basketball Federation) Luis Casimiro	(Spain) Erik Quintela	Hummel	Estrella Galicia 0,0
Surne Bilbao	(Spanish Basketball Federation) Jaume Ponsarnau	(Iceland) Tryggvi Hlinason	Hummel	Surne Seguros & Pensiones
UCAM Murcia	(Spanish Basketball Federation) Sito Alonso	(Montenegro) Jonah Radebaugh	Nike	UCAM
Unicaja	(Spanish Basketball Federation) Txus Vidorreta	(Spain) Alberto Díaz	Joma	Unicaja, Málaga
Valencia Basket	(Spanish Basketball Federation) Xavi Albert	(Spain) Josep Puerto	Hummel	Vitaldin

=== Coaching changes ===
Team	Outgoing coach	Manner of departure	Date of vacancy	Position in table	Incoming coach	Date of appointment
Barça	(Spanish Basketball Federation) Xavi Pascual	Resigned	28 May 2026	Pre-season	(Basketball Federation of Slovenia) Aleksander Sekulić	22 July 2026
Unicaja	(Spanish Basketball Federation) Ibon Navarro	Resigned	9 June 2026	Pre-season	(Spanish Basketball Federation) Txus Vidorreta	18 June 2026
La Laguna Tenerife	(Spanish Basketball Federation) Txus Vidorreta	Resigned	15 June 2026	Pre-season	(Basketball Federation of Slovenia) Jaka Lakovič	22 June 2026
Real Madrid	(Italian Basketball Federation) Sergio Scariolo	Sacked	2 July 2026	Pre-season	(Spanish Basketball Federation) Pedro Martínez	6 July 2026
Valencia Basket	(Spanish Basketball Federation) Pedro Martínez	Resigned	3 July 2026	Pre-season	(Spanish Basketball Federation) Xavi Albert	7 July 2026
Kosner Baskonia	(Italian Basketball Federation) Paolo Galbiati	Sacked	14 October 2026	1st (3–0)	(Croatian Basketball Federation) Velimir Perasović	14 October 2026

== Regular season ==
=== League table ===
Pos	Team	Pld	W	L	PF	PA	PD	Qualification or relegation
1	Real Madrid	9	9	0	933	769	+164	Qualification to playoffs
2	Valencia Basket	9	7	2	934	824	+110	Qualification to playoffs
3	La Laguna Tenerife	9	7	2	791	719	+72	Qualification to playoffs
4	Barça	9	6	3	871	838	+33	Qualification to playoffs
5	Casademont Zaragoza	9	6	3	816	785	+31	Qualification to playoffs
6	Kosner Baskonia	9	5	4	829	772	+57	Qualification to playoffs
7	Unicaja	9	5	4	797	744	+53	Qualification to playoffs
8	Río Breogán	9	5	4	949	930	+19	Qualification to playoffs
9	Surne Bilbao	9	5	4	804	812	−8	
10	UCAM Murcia	9	4	5	787	803	−16	
11	Leyma Coruña	9	4	5	853	910	−57	
12	Monbus Obradoiro	9	4	5	806	865	−59	
13	FIATC Girona	9	4	5	786	854	−68	
14	Asisa Joventut	9	3	6	812	814	−2	
15	Kids&Us Manresa	9	3	6	794	894	−100	
16	Recoletas Salud San Pablo Burgos	9	2	7	802	838	−36	
17	MoraBanc Andorra	9	1	8	777	862	−85	Relegation to Primera FEB
18	iLERNA Lleida	9	1	8	842	950	−108	Relegation to Primera FEB

Updated to match(es) played on 22 November 2026. Source: ACB
Rules for classification: 1) Win–loss record; 2) Head–to–head record; 3) Head–to–head point difference; 4) Point difference; 5) Points scored; 6) Sum of quotients of points scored (Note: Head–to–head record is used only after all the matches between the teams in question have been played)

=== Results ===
Home \ Away	JOV	BAR	CAZ	GIR	ILE	K&U	BKN	LLT	COR	MOB	MBA	RMB	BUR	BRE	SBB	UCM	UNI	VBC
Asisa Joventut	—	113–89	99–94								96–75				78–81			
Barça		—	99–81						119–101	108–83				99–91				89–86
Casademont Zgz			—	107–78	109–98												96–91	82–97
FIATC Girona	101–87			—					110–90						92–87	84–77		
iLERNA Lleida					—	92–98	93–98					86–122	81–94					
Kids&Us Manresa						—				100–99	90–86		81–99	95–101			72–84	
Kosner Baskonia	93–73			118–78		106–83	—					84–98						
La Laguna TFE	80–74	94–82	80–81				82–77	—		106–76								
Leyma Coruña			71–92		113–100			93–89	—		103–100				104–101			
Monbus Obra				91–81	91–89					—		107–114		90–110				
MoraBanc And								84–90		85–90	—			108–102				79–111
Real Madrid	91–88					120–83						—	90–79		119–84	90–71	89–87	
Recoletas Salud							97–98			72–79			—				71–94	93–100
Río Breogán	110–104			115–92									119–110	—			90–103	
Surne Bilbao						107–92	84–80				88–76		96–87		—	76–84		
UCAM Murcia		100–94	72–74		125–98			77–90	88–81							—		
Unicaja		89–92		82–70				75–80			92–84						—	
Valencia Basket					100–105		84–75		111–97					129–111		116–93		—

Updated to match(es) played on 22 November 2026. Source: ACB
Legend: Blue = home team win; Red = away team win.

== Awards ==
All official awards of the 2026–27 ACB season.

=== Player of the round ===
Round	Player	Team	PIR
1	(Poland) Olek Balcerowski	Barça	30
1	(United States) James Batemon III	iLERNA Lleida	30
2	(France) Théo Maledon	Real Madrid	38
3	(Spain) Francis Alonso	Río Breogán	30
4	(Dominican Republic) Jassel Pérez	FIATC Girona	41
5	(France) Timothé Luwawu-Cabarrot	Real Madrid	35
6	(United States) Alonzo Verge Jr.	Leyma Coruña	34
7	(Argentina) Nicolás Brussino	Casademont Zaragoza	36
8	(United States) Rasir Bolton	Río Breogán	50

=== Player of the month ===
Month	Rounds	Player	Team	PIR	W–L
October	1–5	(France) Théo Maledon	Real Madrid	25.8	5–0
