= 2022–23 LEB Oro season =

LEB Oro
- Season: 2022–23
- Games played: 323
- Teams: 18

Regular season
- Promoted: MoraBanc Andorra; Zunder Palencia
- Relegated: Melilla Sport Capital; Juaristi ISB; Bueno Arenas Albacete Basket

Finals
- Champions: MoraBanc Andorra (2nd title)

Records
- Biggest home win: Burgos 98–48 Castelló (25 March 2023)
- Biggest away win: Cantabria 61–102 Burgos (2 April 2023)
- Highest scoring: Burgos 109–95 Cantabria (21 November 2022)
- All statistics correct as of 18 June 2023.

The 2022–23 LEB Oro season was the 27th season of the Spanish basketball second league. It started on 7 October 2022 with the first round of the regular season and ended on 18 June 2023 with the Final Four.

== Teams ==
=== Promotion and relegation (pre-season) ===
A total of 18 teams contested the league, including 13 sides from the 2021–22 season, two relegated from the 2021–22 ACB and two promoted from the 2021–22 LEB Plata.

Teams relegated from Liga ACB

- MoraBanc Andorra
- Hereda San Pablo Burgos

Teams promoted from LEB Plata

- Grupo Alega Cantabria CBT
- Bueno Arenas Albacete Basket
- Hereda Ourense

=== Venues and locations ===
Location of teams in 2022–23 LEB Oro

Team	Home city	Arena	Capacity
Alimerka Oviedo Baloncesto	Oviedo	Municipal de Pumarín	1,138
Bueno Arenas Albacete Basket	Albacete	El Parque	800
Cáceres Patrimonio de la Humanidad	Cáceres	Multiusos Ciudad de Cáceres	6,500
CB Almansa con Afanion	Almansa	Poideportivo de Almansa	1,500
Club Ourense Baloncesto	Ourense	Pazo Paco Paz	5,500
Grupo Alega Cantabria CBT	Torrelavega	Vicente Trueba	2,688
Guuk Gipuzkoa Basket	San Sebastián	Angulas Aginaga Arena	11,000
Hereda San Pablo Burgos	Burgos	Coliseum Burgos	9,000
HLA Alicante	Alicante	Pedro Ferrándiz	5,700
ICG Força Lleida	Lleida	Espai Fruita Barris Nord	6,100
Juaristi ISB	Azpeitia	Municipal de Azpeitia	1,000
Juaristi ISB	Azkoitia	Polideportivo de Azkoitia	500
Leyma Coruña	A Coruña	Pazo dos Deportes de Riazor	5,000
Melilla Sport Capital	Melilla	Ciudad de Melilla	2,900
MoraBanc Andorra	Andorra la Vella	Pavelló de Govern	5,005
Movistar Estudiantes	Madrid	WiZink Center	13,109
Movistar Estudiantes	Madrid	Movistar Academy Magariños	700
TAU Castelló	Castellón	Ciutat de Castelló	6,000
UEMC Real Valladolid Baloncesto	Valladolid	Polideportivo Pisuerga	6,800
Zunder Palencia	Palencia	Municipal de Deportes	5,000

== Regular season ==
=== League table ===
Pos	Team	Pld	W	L	PF	PA	PD	Pts	Promotion, qualification or relegation
1	MoraBanc Andorra	34	30	4	2815	2353	+462	64	Promotion to Liga ACB
2	Zunder Palencia	34	27	7	2817	2488	+329	61	Qualification to playoffs
3	Leyma Coruña	34	23	11	2870	2614	+256	57	Qualification to playoffs
4	Movistar Estudiantes	34	22	12	2690	2509	+181	56	Qualification to playoffs
5	UEMC Real Valladolid Baloncesto	34	22	12	2617	2502	+115	56	Qualification to playoffs
6	ICG Força Lleida	34	22	12	2725	2607	+118	56	Qualification to playoffs
7	Hereda San Pablo Burgos	34	22	12	2849	2557	+292	56	Qualification to playoffs
8	Guuk Gipuzkoa Basket	34	19	15	2628	2542	+86	53	Qualification to playoffs
9	HLA Alicante	34	18	16	2579	2590	−11	52	Qualification to playoffs
10	TAU Castelló	34	17	17	2600	2661	−61	51	
11	Grupo Alega Cantabria CBT	34	15	19	2525	2690	−165	49	
12	CB Almansa con Afanion	34	13	21	2568	2719	−151	47	
13	Club Ourense Baloncesto	34	12	22	2468	2707	−239	46	
14	Alimerka Oviedo Baloncesto	34	11	23	2384	2616	−232	45	
15	Cáceres Patrimonio de la Humanidad	34	10	24	2588	2773	−185	44	
16	Melilla Sport Capital	34	8	26	2612	2864	−252	42	Relegation to LEB Plata
17	Juaristi ISB	34	8	26	2489	2803	−314	42	Relegation to LEB Plata
18	Bueno Arenas Albacete Basket	34	7	27	2492	2721	−229	41	Relegation to LEB Plata

Source: FEB

=== Results ===
Home \ Away	OVI	ALB	CAC	ALM	OUR	CAN	GIP	BUR	ALI	LLE	JUA	COR	MEL	AND	EST	CAS	VLL	PAL
Alimerka Oviedo	—	63–57	68–71	98–88	75–58	62–69	71–86	59–70	68–69	68–84	84–78	93–83	69–78	63–79	68–66	83–66	64–81	56–67
Bueno Arenas Albacete	88–42	—	60–64	78–97	66–74	74–80	56–79	82–91	72–65	75–81	74–79	61–83	84–90	63–93	100–95	78–74	61–68	80–88
Cáceres P. Humanidad	70–68	87–76	—	71–86	92–77	66–79	69–79	87–95	65–72	64–84	60–86	102–94	92–85	70–82	62–70	58–61	81–87	67–78
CB Almansa con Afanion	94–101	88–85	65–76	—	73–66	91–90	97–76	66–75	87–74	67–70	80–61	86–93	70–64	75–82	70–75	82–77	76–60	74–89
Club Ourense Baloncesto	62–67	89–71	76–70	81–75	—	66–79	62–68	95–91	86–77	56–82	87–72	70–80	74–54	62–72	76–86	78–74	82–72	66–82
Grupo Alega Cantabria	76–90	72–66	93–96	71–68	75–69	—	74–72	61–102	76–70	68–67	77–49	84–86	83–80	62–80	76–82	84–64	72–71	67–77
Guuk Gipuzkoa Basket	64–63	91–65	94–88	79–53	88–89	96–70	—	84–79	77–67	68–59	85–76	78–85	78–63	62–79	64–68	48–75	82–94	75–66
Hereda San Pablo Burgos	89–64	81–91	73–63	86–72	96–49	89–62	83–74	—	98–101	90–78	85–59	86–80	74–70	73–95	78–86	98–48	77–58	89–65
HLA Alicante	78–69	86–77	80–68	101–55	84–80	78–77	79–81	69–90	—	79–76	84–73	91–76	77–60	73–66	89–85	74–70	70–71	54–82
ICG Força Lleida	76–65	89–79	94–78	91–77	84–63	91–79	78–75	85–79	82–75	—	91–78	82–91	91–83	88–80	96–66	77–88	85–77	88–81
Juaristi ISB	94–85	67–76	102–97	72–54	76–80	85–74	77–89	76–88	68–70	80–74	—	72–87	97–86	70–97	63–82	75–92	68–78	84–87
Leyma Coruña	87–62	92–75	95–87	100–66	84–51	109–95	68–81	95–81	86–69	63–71	78–73	—	92–80	66–70	74–66	99–62	102–71	81–69
Melilla Sport Capital	67–70	61–70	97–89	82–74	95–77	89–95	78–104	67–88	70–88	62–74	95–69	79–86	—	63–85	79–97	101–81	80–75	78–89
MoraBanc Andorra	79–60	83–70	86–74	78–82	95–61	88–47	72–67	88–82	74–59	90–75	89–61	77–70	92–82	—	85–51	84–72	94–70	97–89
Movistar Estudiantes	90–60	68–63	90–78	75–78	104–86	80–54	79–56	104–96	70–65	94–75	75–55	81–73	75–64	72–79	—	77–52	81–70	73–83
TAU Castelló	75–71	77–68	75–79	81–67	76–64	76–72	96–90	65–67	100–81	87–79	80–70	81–86	105–78	73–81	87–86	—	80–77	85–80
UEMC Real Valladolid	89–72	83–70	90–86	77–75	86–76	67–60	79–64	75–61	68–52	97–57	80–61	73–64	85–66	74–81	81–75	92–82	—	76–70
Zunder Palencia	88–63	101–81	76–61	84–60	86–80	94–72	85–74	84–69	87–79	85–71	103–63	89–82	115–86	72–63	74–66	77–63	75–65	—

Source: FEB
Legend: Blue = home team win; Red = away team win.

== Playoffs ==
Quarter-finals
2	Zunder Palencia	88	75	63	3
9	HLA Alicante	57	68	60	0
5	UEMC Real Valladolid	73	86	71	90	3
6	ICG Força Lleida	66	83	77	83	1
3	Leyma Coruña	67	62	83	77	1
8	Guuk Gipuzkoa Basket	77	71	71	82	3
4	Movistar Estudiantes	87	89	85	0
7	Hereda San Pablo Burgos	92	102	87	3

Semi-finals
2	Zunder Palencia	90
5	UEMC Real Valladolid	60
8	Guuk Gipuzkoa Basket	64
7	Hereda San Pablo Burgos	69

Final
2	Zunder Palencia	95
7	Hereda San Pablo Burgos	83

Source: FEB

== Copa Princesa de Asturias ==
The Copa Princesa de Asturias was played on 11 February 2023, by the top two qualified teams after the end of the first half of the season (round 17). The champion of the cup played the playoffs against the ninth qualified as it finished the league between the second and the fifth qualified.

=== Teams qualified ===
Pos	Team	Pld	W	L	PF	PA	PD	Pts
1	Zunder Palencia (H)	17	16	1	1404	1195	+209	33
2	MoraBanc Andorra	17	15	2	1392	1168	+224	32

Source: FEB
(H) Hosts

=== Game ===
11 February 2023	Zunder Palencia	74–69	MoraBanc Andorra	Palencia
19:30	Scoring by quarter: 15–22, 16–17, 18–14, 25–16
	Pts: Wintering 18; Rebs: Kasibabu 6 Asts: Wintering 4 Eff: McGrew 15	Boxscore	Pts: Speight 20; Rebs: Dos Anjos 8 Asts: Dee 5 Eff: Speight 24	Arena: Municipal de Deportes; Attendance: 5,016; Referees: Ángel de Lucas, Guillermo Ríos, Jorge Baena

== Final standings ==
Pos	Team	Pld	W	L	Promotion or relegation
1	MoraBanc Andorra (C, P)	34	30	4	Promotion to Liga ACB
2	Zunder Palencia (P, X)	39	32	7	Promotion to Liga ACB
3	Hereda San Pablo Burgos	39	26	13	
4	UEMC Real Valladolid Baloncesto	39	25	14	
5	Guuk Gipuzkoa Basket	39	22	17	
6	Leyma Coruña	38	24	14	
7	Movistar Estudiantes	37	22	15	
8	ICG Força Lleida	38	23	15	
9	HLA Alicante	37	18	19	
10	TAU Castelló	34	17	17	
11	Grupo Alega Cantabria CBT	34	15	19	
12	CB Almansa con Afanion	34	13	21	
13	Club Ourense Baloncesto	34	12	22	
14	Alimerka Oviedo Baloncesto	34	11	23	
15	Cáceres Patrimonio de la Humanidad	34	10	24	
16	Melilla Sport Capital (R)	34	8	26	Relegation to LEB Plata
17	Juaristi ISB (R)	34	8	26	Relegation to LEB Plata
18	Bueno Arenas Albacete Basket (R)	34	7	27	Relegation to LEB Plata

Source: FEB
(C) Champions; (P) Promoted; (R) Relegated; (X) Champion of the Copa Princesa de Asturias
