= Eddy Polanco =

Dominican-American basketball player

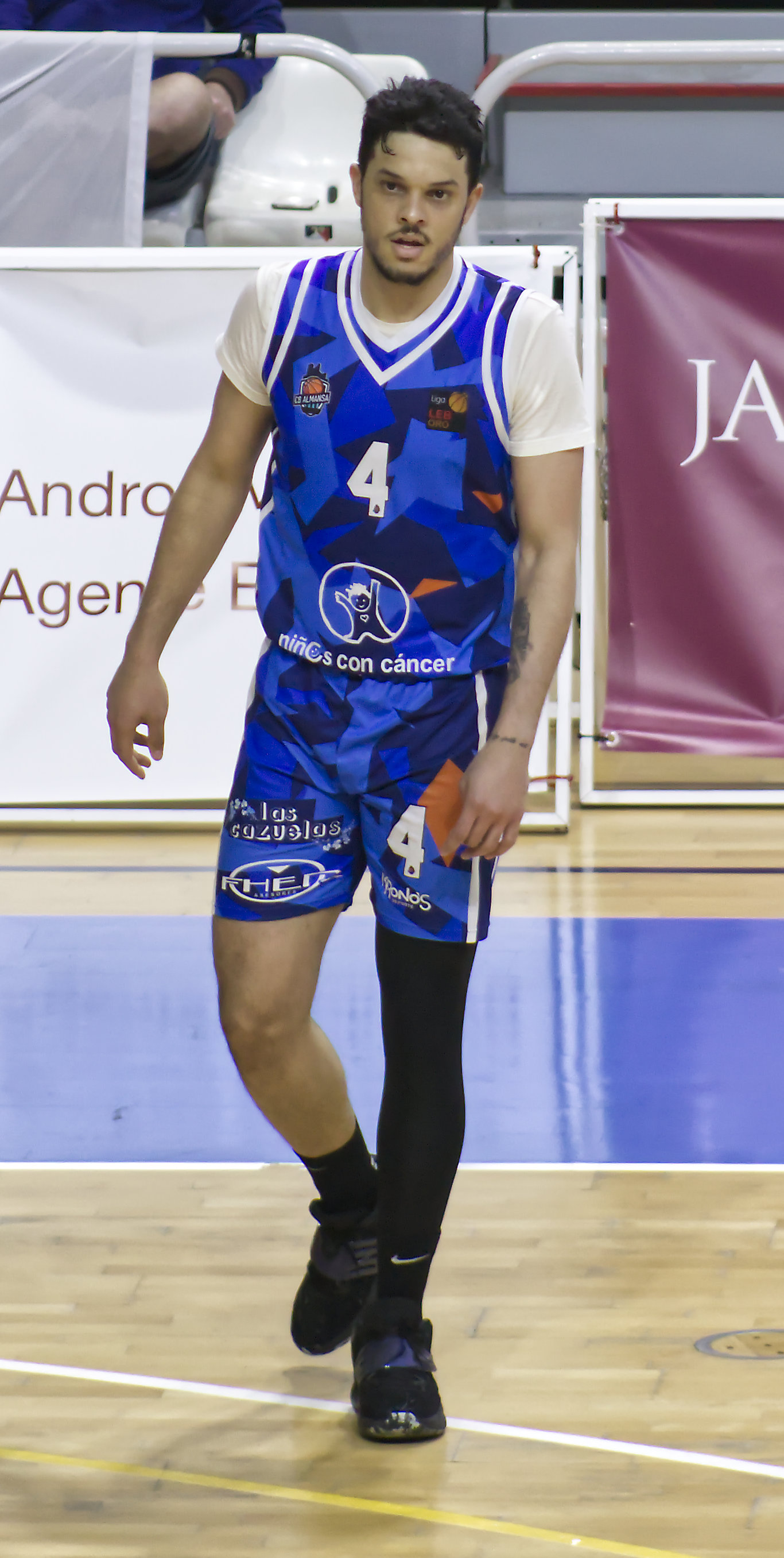

No. 10 – HLA Alicante
- Position: Shooting guard
- League: Primera FEB

Personal information
- Born: August 5, 1994 (age 32) Queens, New York City, U.S.
- Listed height: 1.93 m (6 ft 4 in)
- Listed weight: 195 lb (88 kg)

Career information
- High school: WHEELS (Manhattan, New York City)
- College: College of Central Florida (2014–2016); Southeastern Louisiana (2016–2018)
- NBA draft: 2018: undrafted
- Playing career: 2018–present

Career history
- 2018: Leones de Santo Domingo
- 2018–2020: Albacete Basket
- 2020–2021: Força Lleida
- 2021–2022: Almansa
- 2022: Astoria Bydgoszcz
- 2023: Sporting CP
- 2023–2024: Real Betis
- 2024–2025: JuVi Cremona
- 2025–present: HLA Alicante

Eddy Polanco (born August 5, 1994) is a Dominican-American professional basketball player for HLA Alicante of the Spanish Primera FEB.

== College career ==
Polanco went to the College of Central Florida in Ocala from 2014 to 2016. Beginning in 2016, he played for the Southeastern Louisiana Lions, a team in the NCAA Southland Conference. As a senior, he averaged 8.8 points and 3.3 rebounds per game.

== Professional career ==
After graduation, Polanco signed with the Leones de Santo Domingo. He then joined Albacete Basket of the LEB Plata and scored 44 points in a game in October 2019.

In January 2020, he signed with Força Lleida. He averaged 8.8 points per game in six games. On July 22, 2021, Polanco signed with Almansa of the LEB Oro.

On July 14, 2022, he signed with Astoria Bydgoszcz of the Polish Basketball League (PLK).

In August 2024, he signed for HLA Alicante of the Spanish Primera FEB.
