= Lluís Costa =

Spanish basketball player (born 1993)

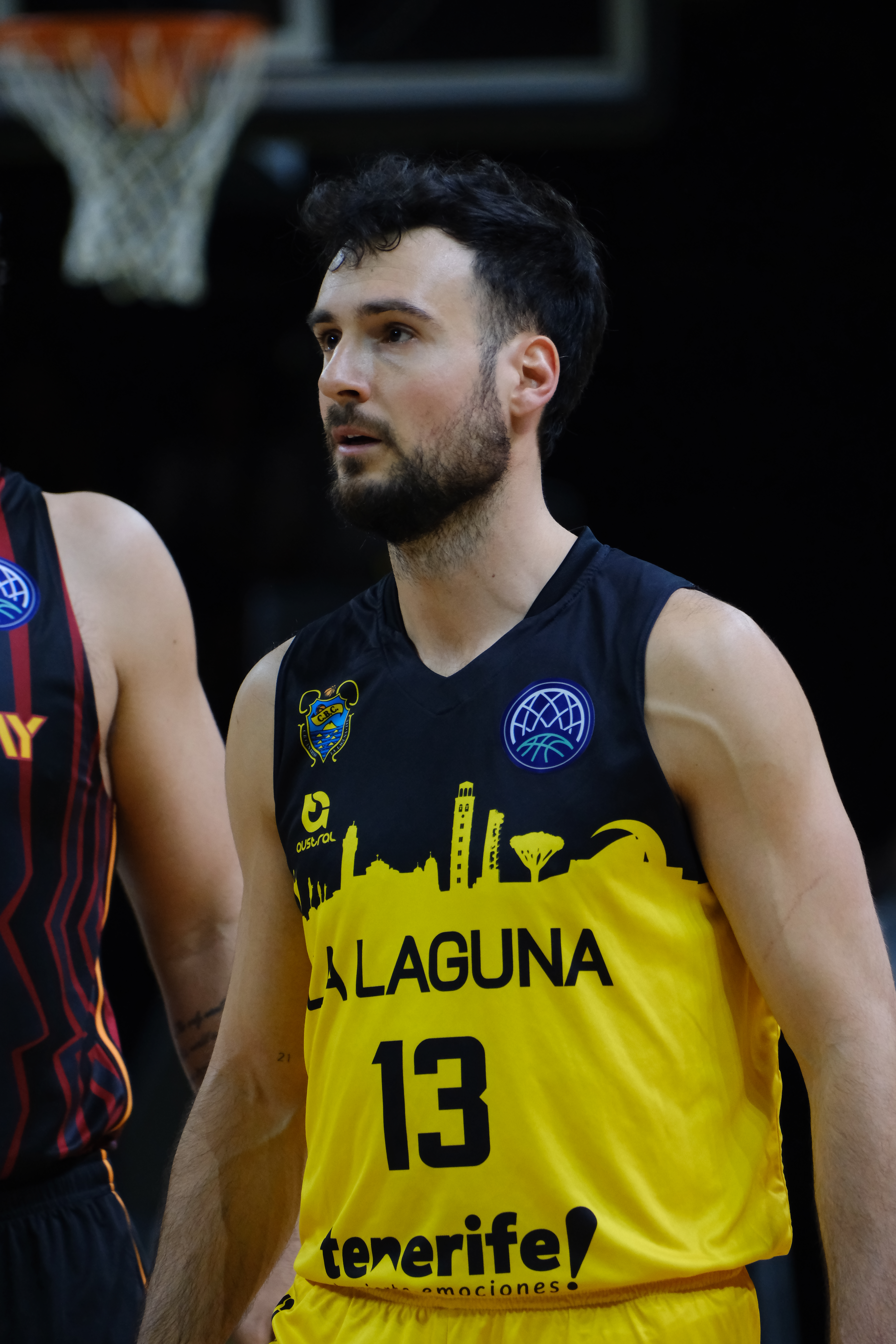
- Costa with La Laguna Tenerife in 2025

No. 15 – Fundación CB Granada
- Position: Point guard
- League: Liga ACB

Personal information
- Born: February 27, 1993 (age 33) Sant Just Desvern, Spain
- Listed height: 1.87 m (6 ft 2 in)
- Listed weight: 80 kg (176 lb)

Career information
- Playing career: 2011–present

Career history
- 2011–2012: FC Barcelona B
- 2012–2014: Huesca
- 2014–2015: CB Tizona
- 2015–2018: Manresa
- 2015–2016: →Huesca
- 2018–2019: Real Betis
- 2019: →Obradoiro
- 2019: DEAC
- 2019–2020: FC Barcelona B
- 2020–2024: Granada
- 2024–2025: La Laguna Tenerife
- 2025–present: Granada
Medals
Men's basketball
Representing Spain
FIBA U20 EuroBasket
Bronze medal – third place	2013 Estonia	U20 Team
FIBA U16 EuroBasket
Gold medal – first place	2009 Lithuania	U20 Team

Lluís Costa Martínez (born February 27, 1993) is a Spanish professional basketball player who plays for Coviran Granada of the Spanish Liga ACB. Standing at 6 ft 2 in (1.87 m), Costa plays as a point guard.

== Early life and youth career ==
Born in Sant Just Desvern, Catalonia, Costa started playing basketball for local clubs CB Sant Just and CB Cornellà. He later joined the youth ranks of FC Barcelona in 2005. He made his debut in the LEB Plata with FC Barcelona B while still being a junior player in the 2010–11 season. He would also take part in the 2011–12 LEB Plata season with FC Barcelona B.

== Professional career ==
After a season as a FC Barcelona B player in the LEB Plata, Costa joined LEB Oro club CB Peñas Huesca in July 2012. He would remain at Huesca the following season, after extending his contract in the summer of 2013.

Costa joined another LEB Oro club in July 2014, Burgos-based CB Tizona.

In the summer of 2015, Costa reached an agreement with Bàsquet Manresa to sign for the team in 2016, spending a first season on loan at his former club CB Peñas Huesca in the LEB Oro. However, due to several injuries in the team's roster, Costa joined Manresa in February 2016. He made his Liga ACB debut in a 2015–16 season loss against Fuenlabrada. Costa left Manresa in the summer of 2018, after experiencing relegation in the 2016–17 ACB season and promotion in the 2017–18 LEB Oro season with the Catalans.

Costa signed with Real Betis of the LEB Oro in August 2018. With Betis, he would win the 2018-19 LEB Oro championship and the 2019 Copa Princesa de Asturias. With Betis' season over, Costa joined Monbus Obradoiro on loan in May 2019, taking part in the final rounds of the 2018–19 ACB season.

After a brief spell with Debreceni EAC, a club of the Hungarian Nemzeti Bajnokság I/A, Costa returned to his former club FC Barcelona B in November 2019. Initially signing as a replacement for an injured Juani Marcos, Costa joined Barcelona B to take part in the 2019–20 LEB Plata before the competition was cancelled due to the COVID-19 pandemic.

=== Coviran Granada (2020–2024) ===
Costa signed with LEB Oro club Coviran Granada in June 2020. He took part in two LEB Oro seasons as Granada achieved promotion to the Liga ACB by winning the 2021–22 LEB Oro championship. Becoming a key player and team captain, Costa helped Granada remain in the first tier of Spanish basketball for the two following seasons. Over four seasons, Costa played 135 games and averaged 10.8 points per game.

=== La Laguna Tenerife (2024–2025) ===
Costa signed a two year contract with La Laguna Tenerife of the Liga ACB and Basketball Champions League in June 2024.

=== Coviran Granada (2025–present) ===
Costa returned to Coviran Granada in October 2025, after reaching an agreement to terminate his contract with Tenerife. After Granada's relegation at the end of the 2025–26 ACB season, Costa extended his contract to remain for one more season with the team in Primera FEB.

== National team career ==
Costa has represented Spain's youth ranks in several international tournaments, winning the 2009 FIBA Europe Under-16 Championship with the U16 Team and earning a bronze medal with the U20 Team in the 2013 FIBA Europe Under-20 Championship.

Costa has also represented the Catalan national team.

== Career statistics ==
Legend
GP	Games played	GS	Games started	MPG	Minutes per game
FG%	Field-goal percentage	3P%	3-point field-goal percentage	FT%	Free-throw percentage
RPG	Rebounds per game	APG	Assists per game	SPG	Steals per game
BPG	Blocks per game	PPG	Points per game	PIR	Performance index rating
**Bold**	Career high

=== Domestic leagues ===
==== Regular season ====
Year	Team	League	GP	MPG	FG%	3P%	FT%	RPG	APG	SPG	BPG	PPG
2015–16	(Spain) Manresa	ACB	13	8.2	.313	.333	1.0	.8	.8	.1	.0	1.2
2016–17	(Spain) Manresa	ACB	27	13.9	.372	.212	.773	1.1	1.6	.3	.0	3.3
2018–19	(Spain) Obradoiro	ACB	3	2.3	1.0	–	–	–	.3	–	.0	.7
2022–23	(Spain) Granada	ACB	32	22.1	.379	.321	.767	1.9	2.7	.9	.0	7.8
2023–24	(Spain) Granada	ACB	32	26.3	.385	.327	.874	2.3	5.2	1.0	.1	11.1
2024–25	(Spain) Tenerife	ACB	25	7.2	.377	.231	.667	.2	.7	.2	.0	2.1
