= 2019–20 LEB Oro season =

LEB Oro
- Season: 2019–20
- Games played: 216
- Teams: 18

Regular season
- Promoted: Carramimbre CBC Valladolid; Delteco Gipuzkoa Basket
- Relegated: None (Note: Relegations to LEB Plata were revoked due to the COVID-19 pandemic.)

Finals
- Champions: Carramimbre CBC Valladolid (1st title); Delteco Gipuzkoa Basket (3rd title)

Records
- Biggest home win: Breogán 97–55 Coruña (21 December 2019)
- Biggest away win: Marín 65–97 Alicante (10 January 2020)
- Highest scoring: Alicante 99–96 Real Canoe (27 September 2019); Palencia 108–87 Castelló (3 November 2019)
- Winning streak: 9 games HLA Alicante
- Losing streak: 6 games Marín Ence PeixeGalego; ICG Força Lleida; Levitec Huesca

The 2019–20 LEB Oro season was the 24th season of the Spanish basketball second league. It started on 25 September 2019 with the first round of the regular season and was curtailed on 25 May 2020 due to the COVID-19 pandemic.

== Teams ==
=== Promotion and relegation (pre-season) ===
A total of 18 teams contested the league, including 13 sides from the 2018–19 season, two relegated from the 2018–19 ACB and three promoted from the 2018–19 LEB Plata.

Teams relegated from Liga ACB

- Delteco Gipuzkoa Basket
- Leche Río Breogán

Teams promoted from LEB Plata

- HLA Alicante
- Afanion CB Almansa
- Marín Ence PeixeGalego

=== Venues and locations ===
Location of teams in 2019–20 LEB Oro

Team	Home city	Arena	Capacity
Afanion CB Almansa	Almansa	Municipal	1,500
B the travel brand Mallorca Palma	Palma	Son Moix	3,800
Cáceres Patrimonio de la Humanidad	Cáceres	Multiusos Ciudad de Cáceres	6,500
Carramimbre CBC Valladolid	Valladolid	Pisuerga	6,800
Chocolates Trapa Palencia	Palencia	Pabellón Municipal	5,000
Club Melilla Baloncesto	Melilla	Pabellón Javier Imbroda Ortiz	3,800
Club Ourense Baloncesto	Ourense	Pazo Paco Paz	5,500
Covirán Granada	Granada	Palacio de Deportes	7,242
Delteco Gipuzkoa Basket	San Sebastián	José Antonio Gasca	2,000
HLA Alicante	Alicante	Pedro Ferrándiz	5,700
ICG Força Lleida	Lleida	Pavelló Barris Nord	6,100
Leche Río Breogán	Lugo	Pazo dos Deportes	6,500
Levitec Huesca	Huesca	Palacio Municipal de Huesca	4,900
Leyma Coruña	A Coruña	Pazo dos Deportes de Riazor	5,000
Liberbank Oviedo	Oviedo	Polideportivo de Pumarín	1,138
Marín Ence PeixeGalego	Marín	A Raña	2,000
TAU Castelló	Castellón	Pabellón Ciutat de Castelló	6,000
ZTE Real Canoe NC	Madrid	Polideportivo Pez Volador	800

=== Personnel and sponsorship ===
Team	Head coach	Kit manufacturer	Shirt sponsor
Afanion CB Almansa	Rubén Perelló	Besten 10	Afanion
B the travel brand Mallorca Palma	Félix Alonso	Pentex	B the travel brand
Cáceres Patrimonio de la Humanidad	Roberto Blanco	Besten 10	Extremadura
Carramimbre CBC Valladolid	Hugo López	Kappa	Bodegas Carramimbre
Chocolates Trapa Palencia	Carles Marco	Kappa	Chocolates Trapa
Club Melilla Baloncesto	Alejandro Alcoba	Pentex	
Club Ourense Baloncesto	Gonzalo García de Vitoria	34ers	Ourense
Covirán Granada	Pablo Pin	Vive	Supermercados Covirán
Delteco Gipuzkoa Basket	Marcelo Nicola	Hummel	Delteco
HLA Alicante	Pedro Rivero	Score Tech	Grupo Hospitalario HLA
ICG Força Lleida	Gustavo Aranzana	Joma	ICG Software
Leche Río Breogán	Diego Epifanio	Hummel	Leche Río
Levitec Huesca	Guillermo Arenas	Barri-Ball	Levitec, Aragon
Leyma Coruña	Sergio García	Wibo	Leche Leyma, Galega 100%
Liberbank Oviedo	Natxo Lezkano	Spalding	Liberbank
Marín Ence PeixeGalego	Javi Llorente	Trezze	Ence
TAU Castelló	Toni Ten	Score Tech	TAU Cerámica
ZTE Real Canoe NC	Miguel Ángel Aranzábal	Spalding	ZTE

=== Managerial changes ===
Team	Outgoing manager	Manner of departure	Date of vacancy	Position in table	Replaced with	Date of appointment
Leyma Coruña	Gustavo Aranzana	End of contract	6 May 2019	Pre-season	Sergio García	9 June 2019
Carramimbre CBC Valladolid	Paco García	End of contract	11 June 2019	Pre-season	Hugo López	13 June 2019
Delteco Gipuzkoa Basket	Sergio Valdeolmillos	End of contract	12 June 2019	Pre-season	Marcelo Nicola	29 June 2019
Leche Río Breogán	Tito Díaz	End of contract	21 June 2019	Pre-season	Diego Epifanio	27 June 2019
ICG Força Lleida	Jorge Serna	Sacked	4 December 2019	15th (3–8)	Gustavo Aranzana	12 December 2019
Liberbank Oviedo	Javi Rodríguez	Sacked	3 March 2020	16th (7–16)	Natxo Lezkano	5 March 2020

== Season summary ==
On March 10, 2020, the Government of Spain decreed that all games would be played behind closed doors due to the COVID-19 pandemic. On March 12, 2020, the Spanish Basketball Federation postponed all the games of the next two weeks. On March 18, 2020, the Spanish Basketball Federation extended the postponement of the games until March 29 due to the state of alarm. On March 25, 2020, the Spanish Basketball Federation extended the postponement of the games until April 12 due to the extension of state of alarm. On April 15, 2020, the Spanish Basketball Federation started talks with the LEB Oro clubs to resolve the future of the league. On April 23, 2020, the Spanish Basketball Federation agreed with the LEB Oro clubs to revoke relegations to LEB Plata and advance in the formula to define the promotions to Liga ACB.

On May 8, 2020, the Spanish Basketball Federation finished prematurely the regular season due to force majeure with the following decisions:

- Relegations to LEB Plata were revoked.
- Promotions to Liga ACB remained.
- Promotion playoffs would be played, as long as, on May 25, the Spanish Basketball Federation had the confirmation that it could be played before June 30, setting the health of the players as an absolute priority, and provided that it was certain that health authorities and clubs could comply with approved health protocols.
- Promotion playoffs would be as follows:
  - The two top teams as of March 8 would play a game for decide the direct promotion. For this game, the game held in the regular season between the teams involved would be taken into consideration, and the winner of the basket average of both games would promote directly to Liga ACB.
  - Three matches would be played between the next six top teams as of March 8: 3rd vs. 8th, 4th vs. 7th, and 5th vs. 6th. The three winners, together with the losing team of the direct promotion game, would play a Final Four, whose winner would promote to Liga ACB.
- If the sanitary conditions would make it impossible to play the promotion playoffs, the two top teams as of March 8 would promote to Liga ACB.

On May 25, 2020, the Spanish Basketball Federation cancelled the promotion playoffs and approved the promotions to Liga ACB of the two top teams.

== Regular season ==
=== League table ===
Pos	Team	Pld	W	L	PF	PA	PD	Pts	Promotion
1	Carramimbre CBC Valladolid	24	18	6	1917	1802	+115	42	Promotion to Liga ACB
2	Delteco Gipuzkoa Basket	24	18	6	1821	1659	+162	42	Promotion to Liga ACB
3	Leyma Coruña	24	16	8	1782	1783	−1	40	
4	HLA Alicante	24	16	8	1931	1786	+145	40	
5	Chocolates Trapa Palencia	24	15	9	1980	1870	+110	39	
6	Club Melilla Baloncesto	24	15	9	1827	1710	+117	39	
7	B the travel brand Mallorca Palma	24	15	9	1839	1732	+107	39	
8	Leche Río Breogán	24	15	9	1950	1813	+137	39	
9	Cáceres Patrimonio de la Humanidad	24	14	10	1837	1749	+88	38	
10	Club Ourense Baloncesto	24	10	14	1710	1794	−84	34	
11	TAU Castelló	24	10	14	1901	1961	−60	34	
12	Afanion CB Almansa	24	10	14	1838	1951	−113	34	
13	Covirán Granada	24	9	15	1734	1753	−19	33	
14	Levitec Huesca	24	9	15	1760	1853	−93	33	
15	ICG Força Lleida	24	9	15	1749	1856	−107	33	
16	Liberbank Oviedo	24	8	16	1682	1818	−136	32	
17	ZTE Real Canoe NC	24	5	19	1844	1942	−98	29	
18	Marín Ence PeixeGalego	24	4	20	1610	1880	−270	28	

Source: FEB

=== Positions by round ===
The table lists the positions of teams after completion of each round. In order to preserve chronological evolvements, any postponed matches are not included in the round at which they were originally scheduled, but added to the full round they were played immediately afterwards.

Team ╲ Round	1	2	3	4	5	6	7	8	9	10	11	12	13	14	15	16	17	18	19	20	21	22	23	24
Carramimbre Valladolid	3	3	1	3	1	1	1	2	1	1	1	1	1	1	2	1	1	1	1	1	1	1	1	1
Delteco Gipuzkoa	13	9	9	5	2	2	4	4	4	3	2	2	2	2	1	2	2	2	3	2	2	2	2	2
Leyma Coruña	17	16	14	13	11	5	8	5	5	5	4	6	5	6	5	5	4	5	4	4	3	3	3	3
HLA Alicante	9	4	6	7	4	6	5	7	6	9	11	11	11	10	10	9	8	8	8	7	5	4	4	4
Trapa Palencia	15	12	10	6	3	3	2	1	3	2	3	3	4	5	7	6	7	7	7	8	8	8	5	5
Club Melilla Baloncesto	4	10	13	11	8	11	12	11	8	10	9	9	9	7	6	7	6	6	6	6	7	7	6	6
B the travel brand Palma	12	13	11	10	9	4	3	3	2	4	6	4	3	3	3	3	3	3	2	3	4	5	7	7
Leche Río Breogán	1	1	4	2	7	10	7	10	9	7	7	5	6	4	4	4	5	4	5	5	6	6	8	8
Cáceres P. Humanidad	11	8	5	8	12	8	10	8	7	6	5	8	8	9	9	8	10	10	10	10	9	9	9	9
Club Ourense Baloncesto	5	2	2	4	10	13	9	6	10	8	8	7	7	8	8	10	9	9	9	9	10	10	10	10
TAU Castelló	18	18	15	12	13	12	13	12	13	13	13	13	12	14	12	12	12	12	14	14	13	12	11	11
Afanion CB Almansa	14	14	16	16	15	16	16	15	15	14	14	14	14	13	14	14	13	11	11	11	11	11	12	12
Covirán Granada	6	7	3	1	5	7	11	13	11	11	10	10	10	11	13	13	14	14	12	12	12	13	13	13
Levitec Huesca	8	6	8	9	6	9	6	9	12	12	12	12	13	12	11	11	11	13	13	13	15	14	14	14
ICG Força Lleida	2	5	7	14	14	14	14	14	14	15	15	15	15	16	16	16	15	15	16	16	14	15	15	15
Liberbank Oviedo	7	11	12	15	16	17	15	16	16	17	16	16	16	15	15	15	16	16	15	15	16	16	16	16
ZTE Real Canoe NC	10	15	17	17	17	15	17	17	17	16	17	17	17	17	17	17	17	17	17	17	17	17	17	17
Marín Ence PeixeGalego	16	17	18	18	18	18	18	18	18	18	18	18	18	18	18	18	18	18	18	18	18	18	18	18

Promotion to Liga ACB
Qualification to playoffs
Relegation to LEB Plata

Source: FEB

=== Results ===
Home \ Away	ALM	PLM	CAC	VLL	PAL	MEL	COB	GRA	GBC	ALI	FLL	BRE	HUE	COR	OVI	MAR	CAS	CAN
Afanion CB Almansa	—	71–81		67–64	70–95		67–78	97–77		76–88	91–81		86–76	62–93	81–64		67–85	79–77
B the travel brand Palma		—	64–75	87–80	79–80			77–53	71–62	63–78	73–83	102–84	80–64	99–71	83–76		78–76	66–78
Cáceres P. Humanidad	76–68	62–68	—			58–54	68–69	88–67		63–65		77–76	63–71		85–73	95–89		79–57
Carramimbre Valladolid		74–66	77–76	—	86–79	78–70	74–73		81–77		80–61	94–82				82–66	87–79	89–84
Trapa Palencia	106–77	68–79	87–86		—	69–81	87–80		60–73	93–84	89–87	90–76				90–58	108–87	
Club Melilla Baloncesto	90–74	68–65	71–60	88–85	74–66	—	80–75	71–68	63–68	66–83			87–62	72–76	76–46	78–67		
Club Ourense Baloncesto	80–86	75–87	74–86	56–77	72–81		—	79–74		68–70	64–49		71–69		65–72		82–65	77–73
Covirán Granada		68–67		63–70	73–68	63–70		—	68–58		86–47	83–88	71–54	70–78		83–56	72–65	84–65
Delteco Gipuzkoa	74–66	65–78	72–64			70–62	73–62	70–66	—	83–58			68–64	77–67	76–63	94–66		86–68
HLA Alicante	83–82	74–75		77–81		65–61	85–58	85–67		—	67–55	83–66	91–70		90–54			99–96
ICG Força Lleida	82–80		67–72	78–67	74–90	72–101			65–69	92–84	—	61–64		81–56	83–89	82–70	87–80	
Leche Río Breogán	85–86		85–92	95–71	75–74	88–84	85–52	86–63	74–97	87–84		—		97–55	72–54	72–56	87–69	
Levitec Huesca			83–94	80–100	92–84	86–67		71–70	69–89		97–73	71–87	—	65–66		93–71	76–90	81–73
Leyma Coruña	75–71		88–77	83–81	82–76		72–65		88–75	100–72	65–82		70–64	—	78–81	68–60	74–67	
Liberbank Oviedo	70–72	70–61		65–71	66–73		81–84	82–81			65–72	72–66	74–84	88–70	—		76–81	62–78
Marín Ence PeixeGalego	74–79	77–90	64–75	69–75			55–65	80–72	64–76	65–97			59–64	49–63	53–73	—		72–58
TAU Castelló	97–83		65–85		82–87	81–91	78–86		91–87	91–85	68–64	68–91		83–68	83–66	80–89	—	
ZTE Real Canoe NC			95–81	81–93	77–80	85–102		81–92	81–82	74–84	89–71	75–82	69–54	69–76		76–81	85–90	—

Source: FEB
Legend: Blue = home team win; Red = away team win.

== Copa Princesa de Asturias ==
The Copa Princesa de Asturias was played on 5 February 2020, by the two first qualified teams after the end of the first half of the season (round 17). The champion of the cup would play the playoffs against the ninth qualified if it would finished the league between the second and the fifth qualified.

=== Teams qualified ===
Pos	Team	Pld	W	L	PF	PA	PD	Pts
1	Carramimbre CBC Valladolid	17	14	3	1382	1249	+133	31
2	Delteco Gipuzkoa Basket	17	13	4	1279	1156	+123	30

Source: FEB

=== Game ===
4 February 2020	Carramimbre CBC Valladolid	55–62	Delteco Gipuzkoa Basket	Valladolid
20:30	Scoring by quarter: 11–17, 18–13, 10–20, 16–12
	Pts: Bartley 20; Rebs: Aboubacar 8 Asts: Federico-Azad, Leimanis 2 PIR: Bartley 14	Boxscore	Pts: Dee 17; Rebs: Rozītis 9 Asts: Uriz 2 PIR: Jawara 15	Arena: Pisuerga; Referees: López Herrada, Albacete Chamón, Fernández Carretero

== Awards ==
All official awards of the 2019–20 LEB Oro season.

=== Copa Princesa de Asturias MVP ===
Pos.	Player	Team
SG	(United States) Johnny Dee	Delteco Gipuzkoa Basket

=== Player of the round ===
==== Regular season ====
Round	Player	Team	Eff.	Ref
1	(Senegal) Bamba Fall	HLA Alicante	40	
2	(Senegal) Bamba Fall (2)	HLA Alicante	44	
3	(Spain) Óscar Alvarado	Club Ourense Baloncesto	27	
3	(Croatia) David Škara	Levitec Huesca	27	
4	(Lithuania) Rolandas Jakštas	Liberbank Oviedo	31	
5	(Spain) Pedro Llompart	HLA Alicante	30	
6	(Netherlands) Joey van Zegeren	TAU Castelló	38	
7	(United Kingdom) Taiwo Badmus	Marín Ence PeixeGalego	36	
7	(United States) Earl Watson	Covirán Granada	36	
8	(Serbia) Brano Đukanović	TAU Castelló	43	
9	(Nigeria) Caleb Agada	Club Melilla Baloncesto	46	
10	(Romania) Alexandru Olah	Leche Río Breogán	28	
11	(Croatia) David Škara (2)	Levitec Huesca	35	
12	(Senegal) Bamba Fall (3)	HLA Alicante	33	
13	(Sweden) Olle Lundqvist	ZTE Real Canoe NC	36	
14	(Nigeria) Caleb Agada (2)	Club Melilla Baloncesto	38	
15	(The Bahamas) Shaquille Cleare	ICG Força Lleida	35	
16	(Spain) Sergio de la Fuente	Carramimbre CBC Valladolid	31	
17	(Senegal) Bamba Fall (4)	HLA Alicante	31	
18	(Spain) Guille Rubio	Covirán Granada	36	
19	(Trinidad and Tobago) Kyle Rowley	Afanion CB Almansa	33	
20	(Spain) Salva Arco	Leche Río Breogán	29	
21	(United States) Stephen Maxwell	Afanion CB Almansa	33	
22	(Netherlands) Joey van Zegeren	TAU Castelló	33	
23	(Spain) Guille Rubio (2)	Covirán Granada	37	
24	(Spain) Francis Alonso	Liberbank Oviedo	36	
