= CB Ciudad de Valladolid =

Club Baloncesto Ciudad de Valladolid
- Nickname: Las Ardillas (The squirrels); Pucela / Pucelanos (Pucelle)
- Leagues: Segunda FEB
- Founded: 18 June 2015; 11 years ago
- History: CBC Valladolid (2015–20; 25–present); Real Valladolid Baloncesto (2020–25)
- Arena: Polideportivo Pisuerga
- Capacity: 6,800
- Location: Valladolid, Castile and León, Spain
- Team colors: Purple and yellow
- President: Lorenzo Alonso
- Head coach: David Barrio
- Website: Official website

Club Baloncesto Ciudad de Valladolid is a professional basketball team based in Valladolid, Spain. The team currently plays in the Segunda FEB, the third tier of Spanish basketball league system.

Alternative logo of CBC Valladolid used until 2020

== History ==
CB Ciudad de Valladolid was founded in June 2015 by the former American-Spanish retired player Mike Hansen with the aim to replace CB Valladolid, the main club of the city, which was dissolved at the end of the 2014–15 season.

In its first season, in LEB Plata, Ciudad de Valladolid was relegated after finishing the league with only nine wins in 26 games. However, the club remained the league due to the existence of vacant spots.

As other teams in previous seasons, Ciudad de Valladolid took advantage and promoted to LEB Oro in the next season by defeating Fundación Lucentum, Morón and Zornotza in the promotion playoffs.

In 2020, when the team was leading the LEB Oro, the season was curtailed due to the COVID-19 pandemic. However, the club was awarded with the promotion to Liga ACB but did not fulfill the requirements for joining the league.

On 28 July 2020, Ciudad de Valladolid agreed collaboration terms with local association football club Real Valladolid and started to use their name, colors and crest.

== Sponsorship naming ==
- Brico Dépôt Ciudad de Valladolid 2015–2016
- Comercial Ulsa Ciudad de Valladolid 2016–2017
- Carramimbre CBC Valladolid 2017–2020
- Clínica Sur-Aspasia Real Valladolid Baloncesto 2020–2021
- UEMC Real Valladolid Baloncesto 2021–2025
- UEMC Baloncesto Valladolid 2025–present

== Players ==
=== Current roster ===
Note: Flags indicate national team eligibility at FIBA-sanctioned events. Players may hold other non-FIBA nationalities not displayed.

Real Valladolid roster
Players
Coaches

Pos.	No.	Nat.	Name	Ht.	Age
C	1	(Nigeria)	Taiwo, Samuel	2.05 m (6 ft 9 in)	26 – 6 June 2000
SG	2	(United States)	Hanna, Jacob
SG	3	(United States)	Haney, Isaac	1.88 m (6 ft 2 in)	24 – 5 August 2002
SF	5	(Spain)	García-Abril, Juan	2.01 m (6 ft 7 in)	23 – 4 January 2003
PG	6	(Spain)	Marín, Pablo	1.88 m (6 ft 2 in)	24 – 20 January 2002
SF	8	(Spain)	Carreño, Pau	1.91 m (6 ft 3 in)	25 – 7 November 2001
PG	9	(Spain)	Isern, Pau	1.85 m (6 ft 1 in)	25 – 13 November 2001
PF	10	(Spain)	Ordóñez, Iñaki	2.05 m (6 ft 9 in)	23 – 1 January 2003
PF	12	(Spain)	Martín, Pablo	2.03 m (6 ft 8 in)	25 – 31 August 2001
C	99	(Tunisia)	Ochi, Fares	2.10 m (6 ft 11 in)	27 – 8 February 1999

Head coach

- (Spain) Paco García

Legend

- (C) Team captain
- Injured

- Roster
Updated: October 29, 2025

=== Depth chart ===
Pos.	Starting 5	Bench 1	Bench 2
C	Kavion Pippen	Justin Raffington	Fernando Revilla
PF	Sergio de la Fuente	Jordy Kuiper
SF	Davis Geks	Sylvester Berg
SG	Jaan Puidet	Juan Garcia-Abril
PG	Alec Wintering	Melwin Pantzar

Colours: Blue - homegrown player; Red - non–FIBA Europe player

=== Notable players ===
- Frank Bartley (born 1994), basketball player for Ironi Ness Ziona of the Israeli Basketball Premier League

== Head coaches ==
- Iñaki Martín 2015–2016
- Paco García 2016–2019
- Hugo López 2019–2021
- Roberto González 2021-2022
- Paco García 2022-2024
- Lolo Encinas 2024-2025
- Iñaki Martín 2025
- Alejandro Paniagua 2025
- David Barrio 2025-present

== Season by season ==
Season	Tier	Division	Pos.	W–L	Cup competitions	
2015–16	3	LEB Plata	13th (Note: Remained in LEB Plata after achieving a vacant berth in the league.)	9–17		
2016–17	3	LEB Plata	2nd	26–18		
2017–18	2	LEB Oro	9th	15–22		
2018–19	2	LEB Oro	7th	22–17		
2019–20	2	LEB Oro	1st (Note: Season curtailed due to the COVID-19 pandemic. However, the club was awarded with the promotion to Liga ACB but did not fulfill the requirements for joining the league.)	18–6	Copa Princesa	RU
2020–21	2	LEB Oro	9th	13–13		
2021–22	2	LEB Oro	9th	19–19		
2022–23	2	LEB Oro	4th	25–14		
2023–24	2	LEB Oro	8th	18–19		
2024–25	2	Primera FEB	16th	11–23	Spain Cup	QF
2025-26	3	Segunda FEB	10th	18-10	Spain Cup	R32
2026-27	3	Segunda FEB			Spain Cup	

== Trophies and awards ==
=== Trophies ===
- LEB Oro: (1)
  - 2020 (Note: Shared title)

=== Individual awards ===
LEB Plata MVP

- Sergio de la Fuente – 2017
