= CB Almansa =

- League: LEB Oro
- Dissolved: 2024
- Arena: Polideportivo Municipal de Almansa
- Capacity: 1,500
- Location: Almansa, Spain
- Team colors: Blue and white
- President: Matilde Cuenca
- Head coach: Tino Ugidos
Home	Away

Club Baloncesto Almansa, also known as Afanion CB Almansa for sponsorship reasons, is a professional basketball club based in Almansa, Castilla-La Mancha, that currently plays in LEB Oro, the second tier of Spanish basketball.

== History ==
In 2017, CB Almansa promotes to Liga EBA and one year later, just in their debut season, the club reaches the LEB Plata by winning the three games of the promotion stage played at home.

The success of the club would continue with a third consecutive promotion, thus reaching the LEB Oro, second tier, on 25 May 2019. Almansa played in LEB Oro until 2023, when it resigned to its place for playing again in LEB Plata. However, it ended the 2023–24 season by being relegated to Liga EBA.

In June 2024, CB Almansa announced its dissolution due to its economical trouble.

== Season by season ==
Season	Tier	Division	Pos.	W–L
2004–05	6	1ª Autonómica	5th	14–12
2005–06	6	1ª Autonómica	2nd	18–10
2006–07	6	1ª Autonómica	4th	17–10
2007–08	7	1ª Autonómica	8th	14–12
2008–09	7	1ª Autonómica	6th	13–11
2009–10	6	1ª Autonómica	1st	16–4
2010–11	5	1ª División	8th	12–14
2011–12	5	1ª División	12th	9–17
2012–13	5	1ª División	6th	15–11
2013–14	5	1ª División	6th	12–14
2014–15	5	1ª División	8th	11–15
2015–16	5	1ª División	3rd	19–6
2016–17	5	1ª División	1st	23–1
2017–18	4	Liga EBA	1st	28–5
2018–19	3	LEB Plata	2nd	25–11
2019–20	2	LEB Oro	12th (Note: Season curtailed due to the COVID-19 pandemic.)	10–14
2020–21	2	LEB Oro	11th	12–16
2021–22	2	LEB Oro	14th	13–21
2022–23	2	LEB Oro	12th (Note: Resigned to the place in LEB Oro.)	13–21
2023–24	3	LEB Plata	23rd	10–18
