= Fundación Lucentum Baloncesto =

Fundación Lucentum
- Leagues: Primera FEB
- Founded: June 17, 2015; 11 years ago
- Arena: Pabellón Pedro Ferrándiz
- Location: Alicante, Valencian Community
- Team colors: White, Blue, Navy Blue
- President: Antonio Gallego
- Head coach: Pedro Rivero
- Championships: 1 Copa LEB Plata
- Website: fundacionlucentum.com
Home	Away

Fundación Lucentum Baloncesto Alicante, also known as HLA Alicante for sponsorship reasons, is a professional basketball team based in Alicante, Valencian Community.

== History ==
The club was founded on 17 June 2015 with the aim to save the basketball in the city after the financial problems of the main club CB Lucentum.

Fundación Lucentum made its debut in the 2015–16 LEB Plata season after receiving the spot of CB Lucentum. On 23 December 2018, the club achieved their first title after defeating 86–68 CB Zamora in the Copa LEB Plata, played during the 2018–19 season.

The head coach Gonzalo García de Vitoria will leave the club after the 2022-23 season, and be replaced by Rafa Monclova.

== Season by season ==
Season	Tier	Division	Pos.	W–L	Cup competitions	
2015–16	3	LEB Plata	7th	16–12		
2016–17	3	LEB Plata	7th	22–13	Copa LEB Plata	RU
2017–18	3	LEB Plata	3rd	29–14		
2018–19	3	LEB Plata	1st	28–6	Copa LEB Plata	C
2019–20	2	LEB Oro	4th (Note: Season curtailed due to the COVID-19 pandemic.)	16–8		
2020–21	2	LEB Oro	4th	19–15	Copa Príncipe	RU
2021–22	2	LEB Oro	12th	16–18		
2022–23	2	LEB Oro	9th	18–19		
2023–24	2	LEB Oro	7th	19–18		
2024–25	2	Primera FEB	13th	13–21	Spain Cup	GS
2025–26	2	Primera FEB	9th	15–20	Spain Cup	R32

== Players ==
=== Current roster ===
Note: Flags indicate national team eligibility at FIBA-sanctioned events. Players may hold other non-FIBA nationalities not displayed.

HLA Alicante roster
Players
Coaches

Pos.	No.	Nat.	Name	Ht.	Age
SF	2	(Spain)	Garuba, Sediq	1.93 m (6 ft 4 in)	22 – 2 February 2004
G	8	(Iceland)	Pálsson, Kristinn	1.98 m (6 ft 6 in)	28 – 17 December 1997
PF	10	(Spain)	Parrado, Arnau	2.04 m (6 ft 8 in)	26 – 24 June 2000
PG	11	(Spain)	Manchón, Dani	1.93 m (6 ft 4 in)	28 – 21 June 1998
PF	12	(Georgia (country))	Korsantia, Giorgi	2.03 m (6 ft 8 in)	28 – 11 January 1998
C	13	(Russia) (Spain)	Mikhailov, Mikhail	2.06 m (6 ft 9 in)	24 – 13 April 2002
PF	20	(United States)	Dreamer, Wesley	2.01 m (6 ft 7 in)	26 – 3 November 2000
SF	25	(United States) (Cameroon)	Choh, Tamenang	1.98 m (6 ft 6 in)	28 – 17 July 1998
PG	28	(Portugal)	Lisboa, Rafael	1.84 m (6 ft 0 in)	27 – 5 April 1999
SG	31	(United States)	Teague, MaCio	1.93 m (6 ft 4 in)	29 – 11 June 1997
PG	33	(Dominican Republic) (Spain)	Torres, Mike	1.88 m (6 ft 2 in)	31 – 24 November 1994
C	35	(Jamaica)	Gill, Romaro	2.18 m (7 ft 2 in)	32 – 2 October 1994

Head coach

- (Spain) Pedro Rivero

Legend

- (C) Team captain
- Injured

- Roster
Updated: September 30, 2026

=== Depth chart ===
Pos.	Starting 5	Bench 1	Bench 2
C	Romaro Gill	Mikhail Mikhailov
PF	Wesley Dreamer	Arnau Parrado	Giorgi Korsantia
SF	Tamenang Choh	Sediq Garuba
SG	MaCio Teague	Kristinn Pálsson
PG	Rafael Lisboa	Mike Torres	Dani Manchón

Colours: Blue = homegrown player; Red = non–FIBA Europe player

== Trophies ==
- Copa LEB Plata: (1)
  - 2018
