= Diego Epifanio =

Spanish basketball coach (born 1978)

Obradoiro CAB
- Position: Head coach
- League: Liga ACB

Personal information
- Born: May 25, 1978 (age 48) Burgos, Spain
- Coaching career: 2004–present

Career history

Coaching
- 2004–2013: Atapuerca (assistant)
- 2013–2015: Tizona (assistant)
- 2015: Miraflores (assistant)
- 2015–2019: Miraflores
- 2019–2021: Breogán
- 2022: Estudiantes
- 2022–2025: Coruña
- 2025–present: Obradoiro

Diego Epifanio Cabornero (born May 25, 1978), also known as "Epi", is a Spanish professional basketball coach, currently serving as the head coach for Obradoiro of the Liga ACB.

== Coaching career ==
After spending more than 15 seasons in the local youth basketball, Epifanio made his debut in the professional basketball in 2004, as assistant coach. When Andreu Casadevall, head coach, left the club for signing with top tier club CAI Zaragoza in 2015, he took the helm of San Pablo Burgos, finally promoting to Liga ACB in 2017.

In his debut season at the Spanish top league, he managed the team to finish in the 14th position, finally avoiding the relegation.

On June 27, 2022, he signed with Básquet Coruña of the LEB Oro. On June 12, 2025, he signed with Obradoiro CAB of the Primera FEB.
