= 2017–18 LEB Plata season =

LEB Plata
- Season: 2017–18
- Games played: 268
- Teams: 16

Regular season
- Season MVP: Tyson Pérez
- Promoted: Covirán Granada; Real Canoe NC
- Relegated: Xuven Cambados; Aquimisa Laboratorios; Agustinos Leclerc; CB Martorell

Finals
- Champions: Covirán Granada (1st title)

Awards
- Best Coach: Pablo Pin

Records
- Biggest home win: Granada 84–46 Martorell (30 September 2017)
- Biggest away win: Zamora 57–88 Granada (7 October 2017); Martorell 74–105 Real Canoe (12 November 2017)
- Highest scoring: Cambados 105–107 L'Hospitalet (14 April 2018)
- Winning streak: 8 games Fundación Globalcaja La Roda
- Losing streak: 11 games Aquimisa Laboratorios

The 2017–18 LEB Plata season was the 18th season of the Spanish basketball third league. It started on 29 September 2017 with the first round of the regular season and ended on 5 June 2018 with the final.

== Teams ==
=== Promotion and relegation (pre-season) ===
A total of 16 teams contested the league, including 10 sides from the 2016–17 season, two relegated from the 2016–17 LEB Oro and four promoted from the 2016–17 Liga EBA. On July 18, 2017, Torrons Vicens CB L'Hospitalet, Arcos Albacete Basket, CB Extremadura Plasencia and Baskonia B achieved the vacancies of Zornotza ST, CB Clavijo, Marín Peixegalego and Seguros Soliss Alcázar Basket.

Teams relegated from LEB Oro

- ~~CB Clavijo~~ (remained in LEB Oro as Sáenz Horeca Araberri did not fulfill the requirements to play in LEB Oro)
- ~~Marín Peixegalego~~ (did not fulfill the requirements)

Teams promoted from Liga EBA

- Real Murcia Baloncesto
- CB Martorell
- Real Canoe NC
- Fundación Globalcaja La Roda

Teams relegated to Liga EBA

- ~~Torrons Vicens CB L'Hospitalet~~ (remained in the league achieving a vacant berth)
- CB Tarragona
- ~~Arcos Albacete Basket~~ (remained in the league achieving a vacant berth)
- Hispagan UPB Gandia

Teams that did not fulfill the requirements

- Zornotza ST
- Seguros Soliss Alcázar Basket

Teams that applied to participate

- CB Extremadura Plasencia
- Baskonia B

=== Venues and locations ===
Location of teams in 2017–18 LEB Plata

Team	Home city	Arena	Capacity
Aceitunas Fragata Morón	Morón de la Frontera	Alameda	600
Agustinos Leclerc	León	Palacio de los Deportes	5,100
Aquimisa Laboratorios Queso Zamorano	Zamora	Ángel Nieto	2,200
Arcos Albacete Basket	Albacete	Pabellón del Parque	1,200
Ávila Auténtica Carrefour "El Bulevar"	Ávila	Carlos Sastre	1,400
Basket Navarra	Pamplona	Universitario de Navarra	3,100
Baskonia B	Vitoria-Gasteiz	Mendizorrotza	2,603
CB Extremadura Plasencia	Plasencia	Pabellón Ciudad de Plasencia	2,500
CB Martorell	Martorell	Pavelló Esportiu Municipal	2,000
Covirán Granada	Granada	Palacio de Deportes	7,242
Fundación Globalcaja La Roda	La Roda	Juan José Lozano Jareño	500
HLA Alicante	Alicante	Pedro Ferrándiz	5,700
Real Canoe NC	Madrid	Polideportivo Pez Volador	800
Real Murcia Baloncesto	Murcia	Pabellón Príncipe de Asturias	3,500
Torrons Vicens CB L'Hospitalet	L'Hospitalet	Nou Pavelló del Centre	700
Xuven Cambados	Cambados	O Pombal	700

== Regular season ==
=== League table ===
Pos	Team	Pld	W	L	PF	PA	PD	Pts	Promotion, qualification or relegation
1	Covirán Granada	30	23	7	2327	2047	+280	53	Promotion to LEB Oro
2	Fundación Globalcaja La Roda	30	23	7	2335	2212	+123	53	Qualification to playoffs
3	HLA Alicante	30	21	9	2354	2184	+170	51	Qualification to playoffs
4	Ávila Auténtica Carrefour "El Bulevar"	30	18	12	2215	2126	+89	48	Qualification to playoffs
5	Torrons Vicens CB L'Hospitalet	30	18	12	2310	2349	−39	48	Qualification to playoffs
6	Arcos Albacete Basket	30	18	12	2238	2238	0	48	Qualification to playoffs
7	Aceitunas Fragata Morón	30	16	14	2299	2201	+98	46	Qualification to playoffs
8	Basket Navarra	30	15	15	2346	2330	+16	45	Qualification to playoffs
9	Real Canoe NC	30	14	16	2338	2349	−11	44	Qualification to playoffs
10	Baskonia B	30	13	17	2276	2323	−47	43	
11	CB Extremadura Plasencia	30	12	18	2276	2321	−45	42	
12	Real Murcia Baloncesto	30	12	18	2141	2200	−59	42	
13	Xuven Cambados	30	11	19	2262	2335	−73	41	Relegation to Liga EBA
14	Aquimisa Laboratorios Queso Zamorano	30	10	20	2388	2494	−106	40	Relegation to Liga EBA
15	Agustinos Leclerc	30	10	20	2388	2543	−155	40	Relegation to Liga EBA
16	CB Martorell	30	6	24	2231	2472	−241	36	Relegation to Liga EBA

Source: FEB

=== Positions by round ===
The table lists the positions of teams after completion of each round. In order to preserve chronological evolvements, any postponed matches are not included in the round at which they were originally scheduled, but added to the full round they were played immediately afterwards. For example, if a match is scheduled for round 13, but then postponed and played between rounds 16 and 17, it will be added to the standings for round 16.

Team \ Round	1	2	3	4	5	6	7	8	9	10	11	12	13	14	15	16	17	18	19	20	21	22	23	24	25	26	27	28	29	30
Covirán Granada	1	1	5	1	1	1	2	4	3	1	1	1	1	1	1	2	2	3	3	2	2	1	2	2	1	1	1	1	1	1
Globalcaja La Roda	9	9	7	9	8	6	4	6	5	8	6	4	3	3	2	1	1	1	2	1	1	2	3	3	2	2	2	2	2	2
HLA Alicante	2	2	1	3	2	4	3	2	4	2	3	3	2	2	4	4	3	2	1	3	3	3	1	1	3	3	3	3	3	3
Ávila Auténtica Carrefour	3	7	9	8	7	5	7	9	8	7	5	7	7	7	8	8	8	8	6	5	4	4	5	5	5	4	4	4	4	4
To. Vicens L'Hospitalet	14	14	12	11	9	11	9	7	6	5	3	2	4	4	3	3	4	5	4	6	6	7	6	7	7	7	7	6	6	5
Arcos Albacete Basket	4	5	3	4	3	2	1	1	1	3	2	5	6	6	5	5	5	4	5	4	5	5	4	4	4	5	5	5	5	6
Ac. Fragata Morón	7	3	2	2	6	3	6	5	7	6	9	6	5	5	6	7	7	7	9	7	8	6	7	6	8	8	8	8	8	7
Basket Navarra	11	6	8	7	10	8	10	8	12	11	11	10	8	8	7	6	6	6	7	8	7	8	8	8	6	6	6	7	7	8
Real Canoe NC	13	13	10	13	14	14	13	12	11	12	12	12	12	13	9	9	11	9	8	9	9	9	9	10	10	9	9	9	9	9
Baskonia B	10	11	13	12	12	13	14	14	14	14	14	14	14	14	14	14	14	14	14	14	14	12	11	9	11	11	11	11	10	10
CB Extremadura Plasencia	6	8	6	6	5	9	12	13	13	13	13	13	13	12	13	13	13	13	11	12	11	13	13	13	14	13	13	13	13	11
Real Murcia Baloncesto	5	4	4	5	4	7	5	3	2	4	7	8	10	10	10	10	10	11	10	10	10	10	10	11	9	10	10	10	11	12
Xuven Cambados	12	12	14	14	11	12	11	10	9	9	10	11	9	9	11	11	12	12	13	11	12	11	12	12	12	12	12	12	12	13
Aquimisa Laboratorios	15	16	16	16	16	16	16	16	16	16	16	16	15	15	15	16	16	16	16	16	16	15	15	15	15	15	15	15	15	14
Agustinos Leclerc	8	10	11	10	13	10	8	11	10	10	8	9	11	11	12	12	9	10	12	13	13	14	14	14	13	14	14	14	14	15
CB Martorell	16	15	15	15	15	15	15	15	15	15	15	15	16	16	16	15	15	15	15	15	15	16	16	16	16	16	16	16	16	16

Source: FEB

=== Results ===
Home \ Away	MOR	AGU	ZAM	ALB	AVI	NAV	BKN	MAR	PLA	GRA	ROD	ALI	CAN	MUR	HOS	CAM
Ac. Fragata Morón	—	83–71	83–61	90–69	81–66	87–68	92–83	84–73	104–71	73–81	80–74	78–74	78–82	70–66	96–69	91–74
Agustinos Leclerc	63–75	—	106–100	62–68	80–77	87–83	76–61	91–81	83–82	82–92	98–101	63–77	95–92	93–99	95–97	94–101
Aquimisa Laboratorios	80–77	84–66	—	96–100	84–79	86–62	90–78	95–71	70–71	57–88	73–93	92–94	91–83	85–62	86–73	85–89
Arcos Albacete Basket	72–65	89–70	75–65	—	86–89	87–74	60–76	81–79	77–76	65–77	71–81	99–87	76–62	72–56	58–66	72–71
Ávila Auténtica Carrefour	67–61	90–74	85–65	71–66	—	75–65	81–65	75–70	78–66	66–73	60–65	63–79	78–65	76–66	71–66	75–61
Basket Navarra	88–68	85–72	87–77	69–72	76–67	—	93–81	86–84	89–75	74–78	78–92	76–82	86–78	79–76	110–78	64–86
Baskonia B	72–68	84–80	91–73	66–81	59–86	76–78	—	77–63	85–83	61–74	75–70	71–85	88–75	75–68	96–70	72–73
CB Martorell	69–79	88–92	95–89	67–74	73–89	65–68	65–62	—	95–85	77–75	75–80	93–76	74–105	97–82	78–81	61–71
CB Extremadura Plasencia	82–64	84–68	93–81	77–73	83–72	74–63	77–75	78–60	—	71–77	77–80	90–98	70–64	89–66	66–81	70–83
Covirán Granada	63–60	95–82	68–65	77–64	91–68	84–75	63–86	84–46	69–67	—	78–62	77–83	94–60	73–76	73–54	68–43
Globalcaja La Roda	69–68	74–77	103–90	71–75	74–60	70–69	66–90	79–77	87–72	76–72	—	89–86	85–68	70–58	70–68	76–69
HLA Alicante	79–59	66–77	77–59	80–55	62–57	71–82	91–72	79–62	69–65	62–55	64–66	—	78–72	95–73	63–68	63–59
Real Canoe NC	92–79	85–75	84–83	89–77	64–73	66–70	97–71	98–91	91–77	72–96	76–81	62–78	—	77–65	75–69	86–71
Real Murcia Baloncesto	69–52	72–79	70–66	76–77	82–69	64–58	78–74	100–68	68–56	78–66	49–68	71–76	71–80	—	50–52	89–76
To. Vicens L'Hospitalet	88–82	85–67	97–84	78–69	54–68	72–84	97–76	84–76	79–69	76–97	89–75	85–93	73–71	61–59	—	93–87
Xuven Cambados	66–72	83–70	74–77	76–78	71–84	99–89	70–78	73–58	74–70	66–69	70–88	94–87	56–67	71–82	105–107	—

Source: FEB
Legend: Blue = home team win; Red = away team win.

== Playoffs ==
Quarter-finals
2 Globalcaja La Roda	74	62	51
9 Real Canoe NC	78	66	75
5 To. Vicens L'Hospitalet	63	67	52	70
6 Arcos Albacete Basket	67	59	89	74
3 HLA Alicante	67	87	85	91	86
8 Basket Navarra	59	68	90	92	61
4 Ávila Auténtica Carrefour	72	75	68
7 Ac. Fragata Morón	67	72	65

Semi-finals
9 Real Canoe NC	59	75	71	60	71
6 Arcos Albacete Basket	55	66	72	74	55
3 HLA Alicante	97	72	76
4 Ávila Auténtica Carrefour	61	58	75

Final
9 Real Canoe NC	84	60	72	65	74
3 HLA Alicante	74	87	70	77	62

Source: FEB

== Copa LEB Plata ==
The Copa LEB Plata was played on 27 January 2018, by the two first qualified teams after the end of the first half of the season (round 15). The champion of the cup would have played the playoffs as first qualified if it has finished the league between the second and the fifth qualified.

=== Teams qualified ===
Pos	Team	Pld	W	L	PF	PA	PD	Pts
1	Covirán Granada	15	12	3	1151	977	+174	27
2	Fundación Globalcaja La Roda	15	11	4	1154	1075	+79	26

Source: FEB

=== Game ===
27 January 2018	Covirán Granada	71–63(OT)	Fundación Globalcaja La Roda	Palacio Municipal de Deportes
12:30	Scoring by quarter: 15–14, 8–16, 14–10, 20–17, Overtime: 14–6
	Pts: Wright 21; Rebs: Wright 12; Asts: Almazán 3 Eff: Wright 35	Boxscore	Pts: Noguerol 17; Rebs: Nakidjim 11; Asts: Hailey, Noguerol 2 Eff: Nakidjim 24	Arena: Granada; Attendance: 6,354; Referees: Baena Arroyo, Lucas Martínez

== Final standings ==
Pos	Team	Pld	W	L	Promotion or relegation
1	Covirán Granada (C, P, X)	30	23	7	Promotion to LEB Oro
2	Real Canoe NC (P)	43	23	20	Promotion to LEB Oro
3	HLA Alicante	43	29	14	
4	Ávila Auténtica Carrefour "El Bulevar"	36	21	15	
5	Arcos Albacete Basket	39	23	16	
6	Fundación Globalcaja La Roda	33	23	10	
7	Torrons Vicens CB L'Hospitalet	34	19	15	
8	Aceitunas Fragata Morón	33	16	17	
9	Basket Navarra	35	17	18	
10	Baskonia B	30	13	17	
11	CB Extremadura Plasencia	30	12	18	
12	Real Murcia Baloncesto	30	12	18	
13	Xuven Cambados (R)	30	11	19	Relegation to Liga EBA
14	Aquimisa Laboratorios Queso Zamorano (R)	30	10	20	Relegation to Liga EBA
15	Agustinos Leclerc (R)	30	10	20	Relegation to Liga EBA
16	CB Martorell (R)	30	6	24	Relegation to Liga EBA

Source: FEB
(C) Champions; (P) Promoted; (R) Relegated; (X) Champion of the Copa LEB Plata

== Awards ==
All official awards of the 2017–18 LEB Plata season.

=== MVP ===
Pos.	Player	Team
PF	(Dominican Republic) Tyson Pérez	Real Canoe NC

=== All-LEB Plata Team ===
Pos.	Player	Team
PG	(Spain) Adrián Fuentes	CB Extremadura Plasencia
SG	(United States) Chris Hansen	Aquimisa Laboratorios Queso Zamorano
SF	(United Kingdom) Will Saunders	Xuven Cambados
PF	(Dominican Republic) Tyson Pérez	Real Canoe NC
C	(Chad) Placide Nakidjim	Fundación Globalcaja La Roda

=== Copa LEB Plata MVP ===
Pos.	Player	Team
PF	(Spain) Devin Wright	Covirán Granada

=== Best Coach ===
Coach	Team
(Spain) Pablo Pin	Covirán Granada

=== Player of the round ===
==== Regular season ====
Round	Player	Team	Eff.
1	(United States) Orion Outerbridge	HLA Alicante	37
2	(Egypt) Ahmed Khalaf	CB Martorell	36
3	(Spain) Jon Ander Aramburu	Ávila Auténtica Carrefour "El Bulevar"	38
4	(United Kingdom) Will Saunders	Xuven Cambados	42
5	(Spain) Javier Marín	Arcos Albacete Basket	31
6	(Spain) Adrián García	Basket Navarra	26
6	(Spain) Xavier Guirao	CB Martorell	26
7	(Spain) Álvaro Lobo	HLA Alicante	34
7	(Chad) Placide Nakidjim	Fundación Globalcaja La Roda	34
8	(Dominican Republic) Tyson Pérez	Real Canoe NC	35
9	(Norway) Karamo Jawara	Xuven Cambados	38
10	(Argentina) Juan Orellano	Xuven Cambados	33
11	(United States) Chris Hansen	Aquimisa Laboratorios Queso Zamorano	40
12	(Spain) Devin Wright	Covirán Granada	39
13	(Spain) Pedro Rivero	HLA Alicante	31
14	(Guinea) e	Aceitunas Fragata Morón	32
15	(United States) Garret Covington	Arcos Albacete Basket	38
16	(Spain) Adrián Chapela	HLA Alicante	31
17	(Spain) Jorge Lafuente	HLA Alicante	33
18	(Brazil) Daniel Bordignon	Baskonia B	36
18	(Spain) Devin Wright	Covirán Granada	36
19	(Cameroon) Johan Kody	Torrons Vicens CB L'Hospitalet	33
20	(Spain) Javier Marín	Arcos Albacete Basket	35
21	(Chad) Placide Nakidjim	Fundación Globalcaja La Roda	31
22	(Spain) José Jiménez	Aceitunas Fragata Morón	44
23	(Dominican Republic) Tyson Pérez	Real Canoe NC	46
24	(Guinea) Cheick Condé	Aceitunas Fragata Morón	37
25	(Argentina) Juan Orellano	Xuven Cambados	36
26	(Chad) Placide Nakidjim	Fundación Globalcaja La Roda	38
27	(Dominican Republic) Tyson Pérez	Real Canoe NC	44
28	(Cameroon) Johan Kody	Torrons Vicens CB L'Hospitalet	37
29	(United States) Andre Norris	Agustinos Leclerc	41
30	(Dominican Republic) Tyson Pérez	Real Canoe NC	35

Source: FEB

==== Quarter-finals ====
Round	Player	Team	Eff.
1	(Dominican Republic) Tyson Pérez	Real Canoe NC	34
2	(Dominican Republic) Tyson Pérez	Real Canoe NC	49
3	(United States) Moussa Kone	Basket Navarra	29
4	(United States) Babatunde Olomuyiwa	Arcos Albacete Basket	26
4	(United States) Orion Outerbridge	HLA Alicante	26
5	(Spain) Álvaro Lobo	HLA Alicante	21
5	(United States) Amadou Sidibé	HLA Alicante	21

Source: FEB

==== Semi-finals ====
Round	Player	Team	Eff.
1	(Spain) Pedro Rivero	HLA Alicante	26
2	(Dominican Republic) Tyson Pérez	Real Canoe NC	29
3	(Dominican Republic) Tyson Pérez	Real Canoe NC	27
4	(Spain) Javier Marín	Arcos Albacete Basket	20
4	(Dominican Republic) Tyson Pérez	Real Canoe NC	20
5	(United States) Babatunde Olomuyiwa	Arcos Albacete Basket	22

Source: FEB

==== Final ====
Round	Player	Team	Eff.
1	(Dominican Republic) Tyson Pérez	Real Canoe NC	40
2	(United States) Orion Outerbridge	HLA Alicante	22
2	(United States) Amadou Sidibé	HLA Alicante	22
3	(Spain) Chema Gil	Real Canoe NC	20
4	(United States) Amadou Sidibé	HLA Alicante	34
5	(Dominican Republic) Tyson Pérez	Real Canoe NC	32

Source: FEB
