= Fundación CB Granada =

Coviran Granada
- League: Primera FEB
- Founded: 2006
- Arena: Palacio de Deportes
- Capacity: 7,700
- Location: Granada, Spain
- Team colors: Red and black
- President: Óscar Fernández-Arenas
- Head coach: Arturo Ruiz
- Championships: 1 LEB Oro; 1 LEB Plata; 2 Copa LEB Plata
- Website: fundacioncbgranada.es
Home	Away

The Fundación Club Baloncesto Granada, also known as Coviran Granada by sponsorship reasons, is a professional basketball club based in Granada, Spain. Their home arena is the Palacio de Deportes. The team currently plays in the Primera FEB, the second tier, following their relegation from Liga ACB at the end of the 2025–26 season.

== History ==
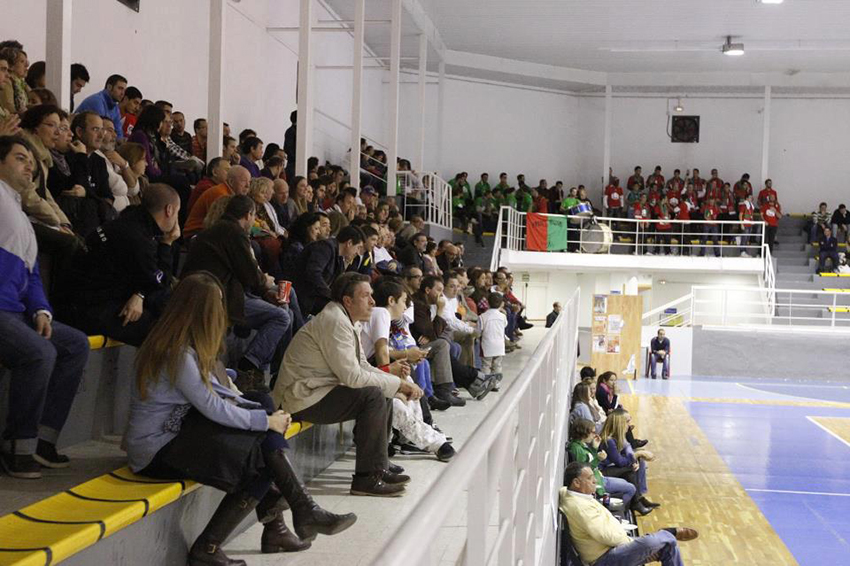
A game of Fundación CBG, in its first season, at Pabellón Veleta

The Fundación CBG was founded in 2006 as an entity associated to basketball club CB Granada, with the aim to promote basketball and other nonprofit activities in the province of Granada.

In 2012, after the dissolution of CB Granada, the entity decided to create a senior basketball team that could replace the defunct club in the city. In its first season, the club promoted to Liga EBA after finishing as runner-up of the Andalusian group of Primera División de Baloncesto.

Two years later, in 2015, Covirán Granada qualifies to the final stage of Liga EBA and finishes winning its group in Albacete, achieving the promotion to LEB Plata, the third tier in Spanish basketball.

On 21 January 2017, Covirán Granada won its first title after defeating HLA Lucentum by 80–74 in the Copa LEB Plata, but failed in the attempt to promote to LEB Oro after being defeated in the semifinals by Sammic ISB.

Granada retained the Copa LEB Plata on 28 January 2018 by winning Fundación Globalcaja La Roda 71–63 after an overtime and promoted to LEB Oro on 14 April 2018 in Pamplona after conquering the title of the 2017–18 LEB Plata.

== Sponsorship naming ==
- Tourapp Fundación CBG 2012–2013
- Coviran Granada 2013–present

== Logos ==
Non-commercial logo since 2022

== Players ==
=== Current roster ===
Note: Flags indicate national team eligibility at FIBA-sanctioned events. Players may hold other non-FIBA nationalities not displayed.

Coviran Granada roster
Players
Coaches

Pos.	No.	Nat.	Name	Ht.	Age
PG	2	(France)	Rousselle, Jonathan	1.92 m (6 ft 4 in)	36 – 7 February 1990
SG	3	(Montenegro)	Kljajić, Jovan	1.98 m (6 ft 6 in)	25 – 11 September 2001
PF	4	(Spain)	Niang, Fallou	2.02 m (6 ft 8 in)	25 – 22 August 2001
SG	5	(United States)	Parham, Gregory	1.91 m (6 ft 3 in)	27 – 8 January 1999
SF	10	(Democratic Republic of the Congo) (Canada)	Kamba, Mathieu	1.96 m (6 ft 5 in)	31 – 5 October 1995
PG	15	(Spain)	Costa, Lluís	1.87 m (6 ft 2 in)	33 – 27 February 1993
SG	16	(Spain)	Durán, Edu	1.96 m (6 ft 5 in)	35 – 1 May 1991
PF	17	(United States)	McGrew, Tanner	2.03 m (6 ft 8 in)	33 – 12 July 1993
SF	19	(Spain)	Tomàs, Pere (C)	2.00 m (6 ft 7 in)	37 – 5 September 1989
C	34	(Senegal)	Barro, Moustapha	2.08 m (6 ft 10 in)	30 – 17 November 1995
C	44	(Senegal)	Thiam, Abdou	2.11 m (6 ft 11 in)	28 – 13 August 1998
C	81	(Belgium)	Van Vliet, Andy	2.13 m (7 ft 0 in)	31 – 27 July 1995

Head coach

- (Spanish Basketball Federation) Arturo Ruiz

Assistant coach(es)

- (Spanish Basketball Federation) Juan Rafael Ruiz
- (Spanish Basketball Federation) Alberto Puertas
- (Spanish Basketball Federation) David García

Legend

- (C) Team captain
- Injured

- Roster
- Transactions
Updated: September 21, 2026

=== Depth chart ===
Pos.	Starting 5	Bench 1	Bench 2
C	Abdou Thiam	Moustapha Barro	Andy Van Vliet
PF	Tanner McGrew *	Fallou Niang †
SF	Mathieu Kamba	Pere Tomàs †
SG	Gregory Parham *	Jovan Kljajić †	Edu Durán †
PG	Lluís Costa †	Jonathan Rousselle

Notes: Blue † – homegrown player; (Note: A homegrown player is a player that played for at least three years before the age of 20 on a Spanish team. In Liga ACB, the team must register at least four homegrown players in rosters of 10–12 players or at least three homegrown players in rosters of 8–9 players.) Red * – overseas player; (Note: An overseas player is a player from outside EEA, FIBA Europe or ACP states. In Liga ACB, the team may register at most two overseas players.) Green ‡ – youth player (Note: In Liga ACB, the team may register under-22 players linked to the youth system.)

== Season by season ==
Season	Tier	Division	Pos.	W–L	Cup competitions	
2012–13	5	1ª Nacional	2nd	12–7		
2013–14	4	Liga EBA	4th	16–6		
2014–15	4	Liga EBA	3rd	22–7		
2015–16	3	LEB Plata	8th	15–13		
2016–17	3	LEB Plata	4th	25–13	Copa LEB Plata	C
2017–18	3	LEB Plata	1st	23–7	Copa LEB Plata	C
2018–19	2	LEB Oro	8th	22–17		
2019–20	2	LEB Oro	13th (Note: Season curtailed due to the COVID-19 pandemic.)	9–15		
2020–21	2	LEB Oro	2nd	25–12		
2021–22	2	LEB Oro	1st	26–8	Copa Princesa	RU
2022–23	1	Liga ACB	16th	11–23		
2023–24	1	Liga ACB	15th	11–23		
2024–25	1	Liga ACB	17th (Note: Remained in the ACB after Real Betis was unable to register for the 2025–26 season.)	9–25		
2025–26	1	Liga ACB	18th	6–28		
2026–27	2	Primera FEB			Spain Cup	R32

== Trophies and awards ==
=== Trophies ===
- LEB Oro: (1)
  - 2022
- LEB Plata: (1)
  - 2018
- Copa LEB Plata: (2)
  - 2017, 2018
- Linares, Spain Invitational Game: (1)
  - 2009

== Notable players ==
Note: Flags indicate national team eligibility at FIBA-sanctioned events. Players may hold other non-FIBA nationalities not displayed.

Criteria

To appear in this section a player must have either:

- Set a club record or won an individual award while at the club
- Played at least one official international match for their national team at any time
- Played at least one official NBA match at any time.

- (Spain) Lluís Costa
- (Spain) Jesús Fernández
- (Spain) Pere Tomàs
- (The Bahamas) Rashad Davis
- (Bosnia and Herzegovina) Amar Alibegović
- (Bosnia and Herzegovina) / (United States) Alex Renfroe
- (Brazil) Cristiano Felício
- (Croatia) Luka Božić
- (Finland) Alex Murphy
- (Finland) Elias Valtonen
- (France) Amine Noua
- (France) Jonathan Rousselle
- (Georgia (country)) Beka Burjanadze
- (Georgia (country)) / (United States) Joe Thomasson
- (Germany) David Krämer
- (Ghana) Amida Brimah
- (Israel) Yiftach Ziv
- (Montenegro) Jovan Kljajić
- (North Macedonia) / (United States) Jacob Wiley
- (Puerto Rico) Gian Clavell
- (Senegal) Mamadou Niang
- (Serbia) Dejan Todorović
- (Uruguay) Agustín Ubal
- (United States) Zach Hankins
- (United States) Matt Thomas
