= Jesús Fernández (basketball) =

Spanish basketball player

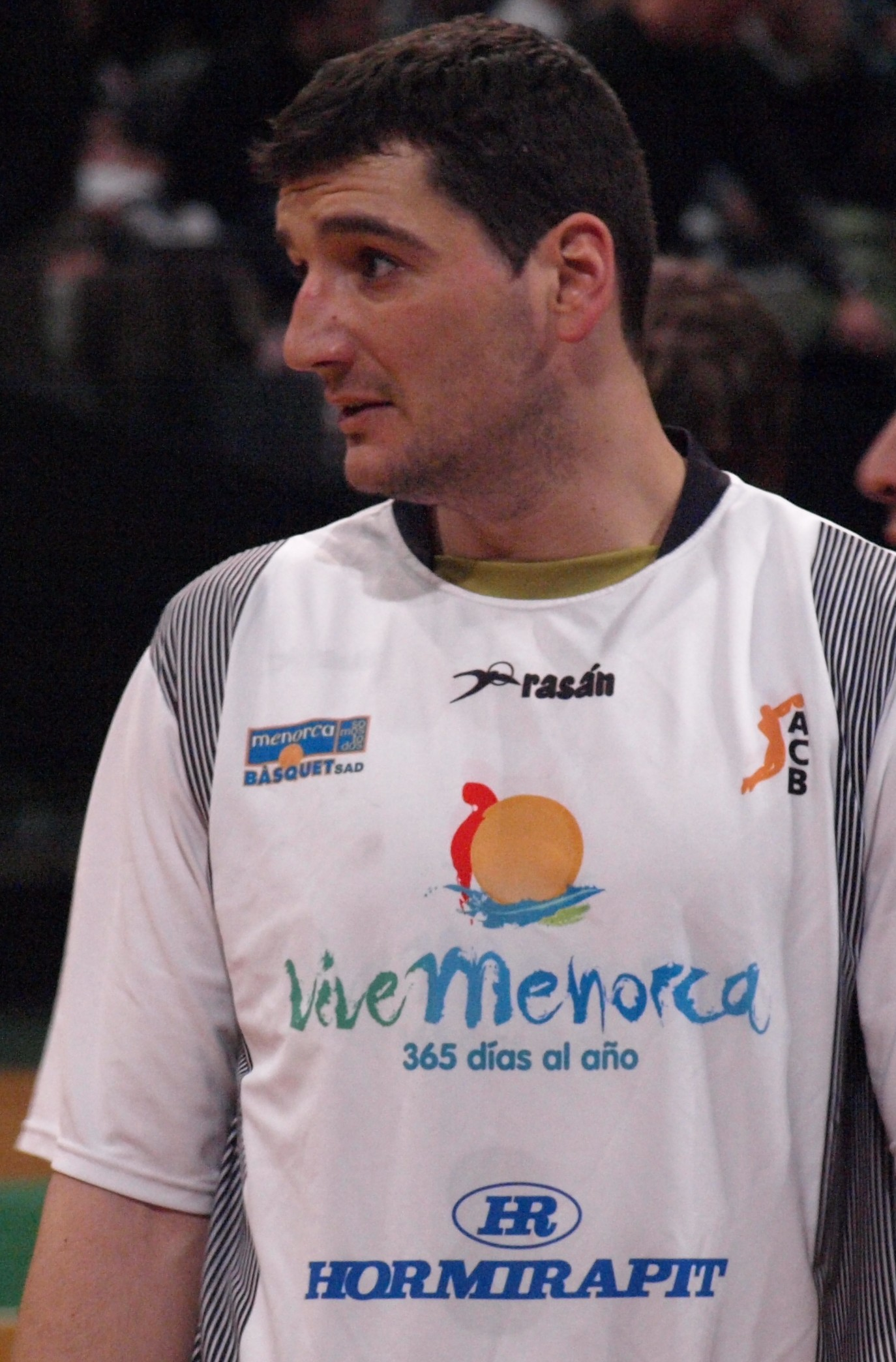

Retired
- Position: Power forward

Personal information
- Born: August 6, 1975 (age 51) Villena, Alicante
- Listed height: 6 ft 8 in (2.03 m)
- Listed weight: 246 lb (112 kg)

Career information
- Playing career: 1993–2015

Career history
- 1993–1994: Valencia
- 1994–1997: Gandía
- 1997–1998: Valencia
- 1998: Lucentum
- 1998–2001: Ourense
- 2001–2003: Fuenlabrada
- 2003–2007: Granada
- 2007–2009: ViveMenorca
- 2009–2012: Granada
- 2012–2013: Lucentum
- 2013–2014: Halcones de Xalapa
- 2014: Andorra
- 2014–present: Fundación CB Granada

Career highlights
- Liga EBA MVP (2015); Copa LEB Plata MVP (2017)

Jesús Fernández Hernández (born August 6, 1975, in Villena, Alicante) is a Spanish basketball player, playing the power forward position.

Fernández spent all his career between Liga ACB and LEB Oro, with the exception of one year in Mexico. He decided to retire in May 2015, after promoting with Fundación CB Granada to LEB Plata, but finally continued playing in the debut of the team in the third tier.

== Honors ==
Clubs Honors

- Copa del Rey: 1998 with Pamesa Valencia
- Copa LEB Plata: 2017 with Covirán Granada

Senior national team honors

- Gold medal at the 2001 Mediterranean Games
