= 2018–19 LEB Oro season =

LEB Oro
- Season: 2018–19
- Duration: 5 October 2018 – 2 June 2019
- Games played: 327
- Teams: 18

Regular season
- Season MVP: Tyson Pérez
- Promoted: Real Betis Energía Plus; RETAbet Bilbao Basket
- Relegated: CB Prat; Barça Lassa B Sáenz Horeca Araberri

Finals
- Champions: Real Betis Energía Plus (1st title)

Statistical leaders
Points	Junior Robinson	19.79
Rebounds	Tyson Pérez	10.62
Assists	Óscar Alvarado	6.18
Index Rating	Tyson Pérez	20.46

Records
- Biggest home win: Oviedo 103–63 Barça B (9 March 2019)
- Biggest away win: Prat 55–98 Palencia (2 December 2018)
- Highest scoring: Araberri 109–111 Melilla (6 October 2018)
- Winning streak: 18 games Real Betis Energía Plus
- Losing streak: 12 games Sáenz Horeca Araberri
- Highest attendance: 9,644; Bilbao 79–61 Palencia (22 May 2019)

The 2018–19 LEB Oro season was the 23rd season of the Spanish basketball second league. It started on 5 October 2018 with the first round of the regular season and ended on 2 June 2019 with the final.

== Format changes ==
On 2 June 2018, the General Assembly of the Spanish Basketball Federation agreed some changes in the competition format:

- The three last qualified teams will be relegated to LEB Plata.
- The semifinals and the final will be played as a Final Four, where the winner will be promoted to Liga ACB.

== Teams ==
=== Promotion and relegation (pre-season) ===
A total of 18 teams contested the league, including 14 sides from the 2017–18 season, two relegated from the 2017–18 ACB and two promoted from the 2017–18 LEB Plata.

Teams relegated from Liga ACB

- RETAbet Bilbao Basket
- Real Betis Energía Plus

Teams promoted from LEB Plata

- Covirán Granada
- Real Canoe NC

=== Venues and locations ===
Location of teams in 2018–19 LEB Oro

Team	Home city	Arena	Capacity
Barça Lassa B	Sant Joan Despí	Ciutat Esportiva Joan Gamper	472
Cáceres Patrimonio de la Humanidad	Cáceres	Multiusos Ciudad de Cáceres	6,500
Carramimbre CBC Valladolid	Valladolid	Pisuerga	6,800
CB Prat	El Prat de Llobregat	Pavelló Joan Busquets	500
Chocolates Trapa Palencia	Palencia	Pabellón Municipal	5,000
Club Melilla Baloncesto	Melilla	Pabellón Javier Imbroda Ortiz	3,800
Covirán Granada	Granada	Palacio de Deportes	7,242
Iberojet Palma	Palma	Son Moix	3,800
ICG Força Lleida	Lleida	Pavelló Barris Nord	6,100
Levitec Huesca	Huesca	Palacio Municipal de Huesca	4,900
Leyma Coruña	A Coruña	Pazo dos Deportes de Riazor	5,000
Liberbank Oviedo Baloncesto	Oviedo	Polideportivo de Pumarín	1,500
Real Betis Energía Plus	Seville	San Pablo	7,626
RETAbet Bilbao Basket	Bilbao	Bilbao Arena	10,014
Río Ourense Termal	Ourense	Pazo Paco Paz	5,500
Sáenz Horeca Araberri	Vitoria-Gasteiz	Mendizorrotza	2,603
TAU Castelló	Castellón de la Plana	Pabellón Ciutat de Castelló	6,000
ZTE Real Canoe NC	Madrid	Polideportivo Pez Volador	800

=== Personnel and sponsorship ===
Team	Head coach	Kit manufacturer	Shirt sponsor
Barça Lassa B	Diego Ocampo	Nike	Lassa Tyres
Cáceres Patrimonio de la Humanidad	Roberto Blanco	Vive	Extremadura
Carramimbre CBC Valladolid	Paco García	Kappa	Bodegas Carramimbre
CB Prat	Dani Miret	Spalding	
Chocolates Trapa Palencia	Carles Marco	Kappa	Chocolates Trapa
Club Melilla Baloncesto	Alejandro Alcoba	Super Sport	
Covirán Granada	Pablo Pin	Vive	Supermercados Covirán
ICG Força Lleida	Jorge Serna	Joma	ICG Software
Iberojet Palma	Félix Alonso	Erreà	Iberojet
Levitec Huesca	Guillermo Arenas	Barri-Ball	Levitec, Aragon
Leyma Coruña	Gustavo Aranzana	Wibo	Leche Leyma, Galega 100%
Liberbank Oviedo Baloncesto	Javi Rodríguez	Spalding	Liberbank
Real Betis Energía Plus	Curro Segura	Kappa	Energía Plus
RETAbet Bilbao Basket	Álex Mumbrú	Erreà	RETAbet
Río Ourense Termal	Gonzalo García de Vitoria	Nike	Leche Rio, Ourense
Sáenz Horeca Araberri	Manuel Povea	Wibo	Sáenz Horeca, Álava
TAU Castelló	Toni Ten	Score Tech	TAU Cerámica
ZTE Real Canoe NC	Miguel Ángel Aranzábal	Wibo	ZTE

=== Managerial changes ===
Team	Outgoing manager	Manner of departure	Date of vacancy	Position in table	Replaced with	Date of appointment
Liberbank Oviedo Baloncesto	Carles Marco	End of contract	24 May 2018	Pre-season	Javi Rodríguez	30 May 2018
CB Prat	Arturo Álvarez	End of contract	7 June 2018	Pre-season	Dani Miret	5 July 2018
RETAbet Bilbao Basket	Jaka Lakovič	End of contract	30 June 2018	Pre-season	Álex Mumbrú	5 July 2018
Real Betis Energía Plus	Javier Carrasco	End of contract	30 June 2018	Pre-season	Curro Segura	11 July 2018
Sáenz Horeca Araberri	Antonio Pérez	End of contract	17 July 2018	Pre-season	Antonio Herrera	24 July 2018
Barça Lassa B	Alfred Julbe	Sacked	17 July 2018	Pre-season	Diego Ocampo	24 July 2018
Cáceres Patrimonio de la Humanidad	Ñete Bohigas	Sacked	13 January 2019	17th (5–12)	Roberto Blanco	13 January 2019
Chocolates Trapa Palencia	Alejandro Martínez	Mutual consent	28 January 2019	10th (11–9)	Carles Marco	29 January 2019
Sáenz Horeca Araberri	Antonio Herrera	Sacked	31 January 2019	17th (6–14)	Manuel Povea	31 January 2019

== Regular season ==
=== League table ===
Pos	Team	Pld	W	L	PF	PA	PD	Pts	Promotion, qualification or relegation
1	Real Betis Energía Plus	34	30	4	2795	2486	+309	64	Promotion to Liga ACB
2	RETAbet Bilbao Basket	34	24	10	2626	2355	+271	58	Qualification to playoffs
3	Iberojet Palma	34	22	12	2664	2487	+177	56	Qualification to playoffs
4	Liberbank Oviedo Baloncesto	34	22	12	2607	2409	+198	56	Qualification to playoffs
5	Club Melilla Baloncesto	34	21	13	2536	2516	+20	55	Qualification to playoffs
6	Carramimbre CBC Valladolid	34	20	14	2658	2535	+123	54	Qualification to playoffs
7	Río Ourense Termal	34	20	14	2528	2416	+112	54	Qualification to playoffs
8	Covirán Granada	34	20	14	2540	2421	+119	54	Qualification to playoffs
9	Chocolates Trapa Palencia	34	19	15	2683	2690	−7	53	Qualification to playoffs
10	Levitec Huesca	34	18	16	2596	2576	+20	52	
11	ICG Força Lleida	34	16	18	2498	2476	+22	50	
12	Leyma Coruña	34	14	20	2596	2638	−42	48	
13	TAU Castelló	34	13	21	2568	2645	−77	47	
14	Cáceres Patrimonio de la Humanidad	34	11	23	2388	2567	−179	45	
15	ZTE Real Canoe NC	34	11	23	2321	2648	−327	45	
16	CB Prat	34	9	25	2420	2724	−304	43	Relegation to LEB Plata
17	Barça Lassa B	34	9	25	2384	2534	−150	43	Relegation to LEB Plata
18	Sáenz Horeca Araberri	34	7	27	2516	2801	−285	41	Relegation to LEB Plata

Source: FEB

=== Positions by round ===
The table lists the positions of teams after completion of each round. In order to preserve chronological evolvements, any postponed matches are not included in the round at which they were originally scheduled, but added to the full round they were played immediately afterwards. For example, if a match is scheduled for round 13, but then postponed and played between rounds 16 and 17, it will be added to the standings for round 16.

Team ╲ Round	1	2	3	4	5	6	7	8	9	10	11	12	13	14	15	16	17	18	19	20	21	22	23	24	25	26	27	28	29	30	31	32	33	34
Real Betis Energía Plus	16	8	13	9	7	6	6	5	3	1	1	1	1	1	1	1	1	1	1	1	1	1	1	1	1	1	1	1	1	1	1	1	1	1
RETAbet Bilbao Basket	5	4	1	5	5	3	5	4	4	4	3	5	4	3	2	2	2	3	3	3	2	2	2	2	4	3	2	3	2	2	2	2	2	2
Iberojet Palma	18	9	7	10	12	13	11	13	11	9	8	10	11	11	10	11	11	11	11	10	11	10	10	10	9	9	8	8	6	4	4	4	3	3
Liberbank Oviedo	14	6	11	8	11	9	7	6	7	6	6	3	6	6	6	5	5	4	2	2	6	6	4	4	3	2	3	2	3	3	3	3	4	4
Club Melilla Baloncesto	9	3	8	12	9	7	9	10	10	8	10	7	7	8	7	6	8	8	5	6	4	3	3	3	2	5	4	4	5	6	6	7	6	5
Carramimbre Valladolid	13	7	6	4	2	5	4	7	8	10	9	11	8	9	11	10	10	9	9	9	9	9	9	8	8	8	10	9	9	8	9	9	7	6
Río Ourense Termal	11	5	4	7	6	8	12	9	6	11	11	8	10	10	9	9	7	7	7	7	5	7	7	6	5	4	6	6	4	5	5	6	5	7
Covirán Granada	7	13	10	3	8	10	8	8	9	7	7	9	9	7	8	8	6	5	6	5	3	5	5	5	7	6	5	5	7	9	7	5	9	8
Trapa Palencia	2	2	2	1	3	2	2	1	5	5	4	2	2	2	4	4	4	6	8	8	8	8	6	7	6	7	7	7	8	7	8	8	8	9
Levitec Huesca	3	14	9	6	4	4	3	2	2	3	5	6	5	4	3	3	3	2	4	4	7	4	8	9	10	10	9	10	10	10	10	10	10	10
ICG Força Lleida	1	1	3	2	1	1	1	3	1	2	2	4	3	5	5	7	9	10	10	11	10	11	11	11	11	11	11	11	11	11	11	11	11	11
Leyma Coruña	6	11	12	14	15	16	16	17	17	17	17	17	16	13	13	13	12	13	13	13	12	12	12	12	13	13	13	13	13	13	13	13	12	12
TAU Castelló	4	10	5	11	13	14	14	14	14	15	15	14	14	15	16	16	17	17	17	14	14	14	14	15	12	12	12	12	12	12	12	12	13	13
Cáceres P. Humanidad	8	12	15	16	17	15	15	16	16	16	16	15	17	17	17	17	16	14	14	15	15	16	17	17	17	16	17	17	16	15	15	15	15	14
ZTE Real Canoe NC	17	18	14	17	14	11	13	11	12	12	13	12	12	12	12	12	13	12	12	12	13	13	13	13	14	14	14	14	14	14	14	14	14	15
CB Prat	15	17	18	15	16	18	18	18	18	18	18	18	18	18	18	18	18	18	18	18	18	18	18	18	18	18	16	16	18	17	17	17	16	16
Barça Lassa B	12	15	17	13	10	12	10	12	13	14	14	16	15	16	15	15	14	16	15	16	16	17	15	14	15	15	15	15	15	16	16	16	17	17
Sáenz Horeca Araberri	10	16	16	18	18	17	17	15	15	13	12	13	13	14	14	14	15	15	16	17	17	15	16	16	16	17	18	18	17	18	18	18	18	18

Promotion to Liga ACB
Qualification to promotion playoffs
Relegation to LEB Plata

Source: FEB

=== Results ===
Home \ Away	BAR	CAC	VLL	PRA	PAL	MEL	GRA	PLM	FLL	HUE	COR	OVI	BET	BLB	COB	ARA	CAS	CAN
Barça Lassa B	—	64–68	65–69	75–81	81–63	60–78	78–60	72–84	71–74	77–60	65–88	60–63	73–82	76–84	63–76	72–71	57–62	64–61
Cáceres P. Humanidad	70–49	—	66–74	87–74	85–87	60–71	85–79	80–75	58–69	68–75	84–80	57–70	72–77	74–76	80–83	77–64	81–86	65–63
Carramimbre Valladolid	66–71	75–71	—	95–73	76–80	70–76	80–70	80–76	79–58	84–50	75–65	79–85	74–67	79–64	66–72	91–79	70–56	96–79
CB Prat	70–66	95–66	73–71	—	55–98	73–77	61–76	85–83	65–82	56–83	76–66	79–78	88–90	66–73	67–88	75–88	72–82	72–75
Trapa Palencia	86–83	70–76	101–97	64–63	—	76–84	76–79	87–95	81–77	77–76	93–84	66–84	66–76	78–71	76–88	92–87	84–59	94–96
Club Melilla Baloncesto	63–95	78–76	79–72	72–88	77–74	—	67–53	75–63	83–72	69–79	67–70	74–69	72–77	63–76	69–63	77–82	82–72	82–59
Covirán Granada	73–53	67–64	64–74	85–54	73–60	76–85	—	82–84	79–63	87–64	93–59	70–73	60–81	72–70	68–64	86–59	70–59	87–60
Iberojet Palma	83–76	82–74	84–87	99–70	82–70	79–65	60–78	—	85–57	78–58	84–72	65–51	92–58	67–45	77–72	71–79	71–87 (Note: Match partially repeated due to a mistake in the scoring of the match. TAU Castelló retained the win.)	96–74
ICG Força Lleida	67–66	93–70	68–72	80–58	90–80	67–66	78–70	86–66	—	85–89	88–90	67–70	84–86	70–75	61–70	68–52	88–82	73–55
Levitec Huesca	74–65	86–59	73–74	97–86	68–79	87–88	89–82	64–70	74–77	—	83–78	68–66	92–84	61–74	79–74	105–68	95–84	94–66
Leyma Coruña	58–49	68–55	95–90	85–67	95–109	72–76	73–80	76–79	73–61	86–74	—	98–76	70–78	64–74	63–78	96–82	83–84	85–59
Liberbank Oviedo	103–63	82–62	78–68	81–71	81–83	75–78	76–56	72–66	83–68	73–58	80–70	—	84–90	77–82	78–81	71–63	95–70	78–56
Real Betis Energía Plus	81–58	80–71	88–83	78–63	94–69	85–64	93–80	82–77	77–68	84–65	96–88	85–69	—	70–64	82–74	94–82	78–63	99–68
RETAbet Bilbao Basket	82–85	82–53	84–77	93–75	88–59	62–59	93–68	77–71	81–70	69–76	87–59	72–81	98–68	—	73–60	76–77	87–78	93–62
Río Ourense Termal	76–69	85–73	81–75	74–59	52–55	68–60	80–83	54–66	62–70	78–62	96–75	67–74	65–94	70–82	—	65–58	72–82	71–50
Sáenz Horeca Araberri	81–96	67–68	78–82	62–71	82–94	109–111	84–89	76–79	73–89	81–87	76–82	74–72	55–81	52–76	85–94	—	80–78	69–92
TAU Castelló	85–81	84–60	83–94	78–71	66–72	73–81	69–78	99–100	70–66	79–82	59–72	84–89	69–74	74–62	80–85	79–66	—	88–75
ZTE Real Canoe NC	92–86	57–73	83–64	77–68	70–84	84–68	53–66	67–75	65–64	71–69	65–58	59–70	66–86	64–81	62–90	64–75	72–65	—

Source: FEB
Legend: Blue = home team win; Red = away team win.

== Playoffs ==
Quarter-finals
2 RETAbet Bilbao Basket	93	77	87	57	79
9 Trapa Palencia	73	86	81	61	61
5 Club Melilla Baloncesto	76	76	64	76	77
6 Carramimbre Valladolid	78	70	85	72	71
3 Iberojet Palma	73	83	63	71	76
8 Covirán Granada	69	88	62	83	75
4 Liberbank Oviedo	76	71	75
7 Río Ourense Termal	80	76	77

Semi-finals
2 RETAbet Bilbao Basket	75
5 Club Melilla Baloncesto	68
3 Iberojet Palma	77
7 Río Ourense Termal	61

Final
2 RETAbet Bilbao Basket	62
3 Iberojet Palma	55

Source: FEB

== Copa Princesa de Asturias ==
The Copa Princesa de Asturias was played on 8 February 2019, by the two first qualified teams after the end of the first half of the season (round 17). The champion of the cup would have played the playoffs against the ninth qualified if it has finished the league between the second and the fifth qualified.

=== Teams qualified ===
Pos	Team	Pld	W	L	PF	PA	PD	Pts
1	Real Betis Energía Plus	17	15	2	1431	1242	+189	32
2	RETAbet Bilbao Basket	17	12	5	1319	1197	+122	29

Source: FEB

=== Game ===
9 February 2019	Real Betis Energía Plus	80–70	RETAbet Bilbao Basket	Seville
18:00	Scoring by quarter: 20–19, 20–16, 21–11, 19–24
	Pts: Bropleh 16; Rebs: Stainbrook 7 Asts: Olumuyiwa 3 Eff: Bropleh 22	Boxscore	Pts: Brown 23; Rebs: Cruz 9 Asts: Schreiner 5 Eff: Cruz 16	Arena: San Pablo; Attendance: 6,644; Referees: García León, García González, Lerma Parga

== Final standings ==
Pos	Team	Pld	W	L	Promotion or relegation
1	Real Betis Energía Plus (C, P, X)	34	30	4	Promotion to Liga ACB
2	RETAbet Bilbao Basket (P)	41	29	12	Promotion to Liga ACB
3	Iberojet Palma	41	26	15	
4	Club Melilla Baloncesto	40	24	16	
5	Río Ourense Termal	38	23	15	
6	Liberbank Oviedo Baloncesto	37	22	15	
7	Carramimbre CBC Valladolid	39	22	17	
8	Covirán Granada	39	22	17	
9	Chocolates Trapa Palencia	39	21	18	
10	Levitec Huesca	34	18	16	
11	ICG Força Lleida	34	16	18	
12	Leyma Coruña	34	14	20	
13	TAU Castelló	34	13	21	
14	Cáceres Patrimonio de la Humanidad	34	11	23	
15	ZTE Real Canoe NC	34	11	23	
16	CB Prat (R)	34	9	25	Relegation to LEB Plata
17	Barça Lassa B (R)	34	9	25	Relegation to LEB Plata
18	Sáenz Horeca Araberri (R)	34	7	27	Relegation to LEB Plata

Source: FEB
(C) Champions; (P) Promoted; (R) Relegated; (X) Champion of the Copa Princesa de Asturias

== Individual statistics ==
=== Points ===
Rank	Name	Team	Games	Points	PPG
1	(United States) Junior Robinson	Sáenz Horeca Araberri	34	673	19.8
2	(United States) Steve Vasturia	Chocolates Trapa Palencia	34	550	16.2
3	(Dominican Republic) Tyson Pérez	ZTE Real Canoe NC	26	415	16
4	(Spain) Aleix Font	Barça Lassa B	34	516	15.2
5	(Venezuela) Jhornan Zamora	Río Ourense Termal	32	472	14.7

Source: FEB

=== Rebounds ===
Rank	Name	Team	Games	Rebounds	RPG
1	(Dominican Republic) Tyson Pérez	ZTE Real Canoe NC	26	276	10.6
2	(Dominican Republic) Juan José García	TAU Castelló	29	236	8.1
3	(Latvia) Dāvis Rozītis	Río Ourense Termal	34	273	8
4	(Spain) Fran Guerra	Iberojet Palma	32	245	7.7
5	(Spain) Óliver Arteaga	Liberbank Oviedo Baloncesto	34	247	7.3

Source: FEB

=== Assists ===
Rank	Player	Team	Games	Assists	APG
1	(Spain) Óscar Alvarado	Carramimbre CBC Valladolid	34	210	6.2
2	(Uruguay) Pepo Vidal	Río Ourense Termal	30	167	5.6
3	(Spain) Javi Salgado	RETAbet Bilbao Basket	34	186	5.5
4	(Spain) Pol Figueras	Barça Lassa B	34	160	4.7
5	(Austria) Thomas Schreiner	RETAbet Bilbao Basket	33	147	4.4

Source: FEB

=== Efficiency ===
Rank	Player	Team	Games	Efficiency	EPG
1	(Dominican Republic) Tyson Pérez	ZTE Real Canoe NC	26	532	20.5
2	(Spain) Fran Guerra	Iberojet Palma	32	620	19.4
3	(Spain) Óliver Arteaga	Liberbank Oviedo Baloncesto	34	657	19.3
4	(Dominican Republic) Juan José García	TAU Castelló	29	537	18.5
5	(United States) Steve Vasturia	Chocolates Trapa Palencia	34	589	17.3

Source: FEB

== Awards ==
All official awards of the 2018–19 LEB Oro season.

=== MVP ===
Pos.	Player	Team
PF	(Dominican Republic) Tyson Pérez	ZTE Real Canoe NC

=== All-LEB Oro Team ===
Pos.	Player	Team
PG	(United States) Junior Robinson	Sáenz Horeca Araberri
SG	(United States) Steve Vasturia	Chocolates Trapa Palencia
SF	(Spain) Aleix Font	Barça Lassa B
PF	(Dominican Republic) Tyson Pérez	ZTE Real Canoe NC
C	(Spain) Fran Guerra	Iberojet Palma

=== Final Four MVP ===
Pos.	Player	Team
PG	(Austria) Thomas Schreiner	RETAbet Bilbao Basket

=== Copa Princesa de Asturias MVP ===
Pos.	Player	Team
SF	(United States) Thomas Bropleh	Real Betis Energía Plus

=== Best Coach ===
Coach	Team
(Spain) Curro Segura	Real Betis Energía Plus

=== Player of the round ===
Round	Player	Team	Eff.
1	(United States) Junior Robinson	Sáenz Horeca Araberri	47
2	(Dominican Republic) Juan José García	TAU Castelló	34
3	(Spain) Josep Pérez	Covirán Granada	34
4	(Spain) Aleix Font	Barça Lassa B	37
5	(Spain) Chema Gil	ZTE Real Canoe NC	28
6	(Dominican Republic) Tyson Pérez	ZTE Real Canoe NC	40
7	(Spain) Urko Otegui	Chocolates Trapa Palencia	35
8	(United States) Steve Vasturia	Chocolates Trapa Palencia	42
9	(Spain) Joan Faner	TAU Castelló	31
10	(Spain) Víctor Serrano	Cáceres Patrimonio de la Humanidad	32
11	(Dominican Republic) Tyson Pérez (2)	ZTE Real Canoe NC	27
11	(Brazil) Leo Demetrio	RETAbet Bilbao Basket	27
12	(Spain) Óliver Arteaga	Liberbank Oviedo Baloncesto	33
13	(Spain) Dani García	Levitec Huesca	30
14	(Dominican Republic) Tyson Pérez (3)	ZTE Real Canoe NC	35
15	(United States) Ben Lammers	RETAbet Bilbao Basket	33
16	(Canada) Mathieu Kamba	Sáenz Horeca Araberri	31
17	(Spain) Sergi Pino	Leyma Coruña	35
18	(Spain) Txemi Urtasun	Club Melilla Baloncesto	32
19	(United States) Eric Stutz	ICG Força Lleida	28
20	(Dominican Republic) Juan José García (2)	TAU Castelló	32
21	(Bosnia and Herzegovina) Mirza Bulić	Leyma Coruña	42
22	(Spain) Sergi Martínez	Barça Lassa B	26
23	(Australia) Dan Trist	Cáceres Patrimonio de la Humanidad	38
24	(United States) Moussa Kone	Chocolates Trapa Palencia	35
25	(Dominican Republic) Juan José García (3)	TAU Castelló	29
26	(Spain) Carlos Corts	Covirán Granada	26
27	(Spain) Marc Blanch	CB Prat	31
28	(United States) Ben Lammers (2)	RETAbet Bilbao Basket	39
29	(Latvia) Dāvis Rozītis	Río Ourense Termal	32
30	(Spain) Fran Guerra	Iberojet Palma	26
30	(Spain) Urko Otegui (2)	Chocolates Trapa Palencia	26
31	(Dominican Republic) Juan José García (4)	TAU Castelló	31
32	(United States) Jeff Xavier	Leyma Coruña	28
32	(Spain) Sergio de la Fuente	Carramimbre CBC Valladolid	28
33	(Estonia) Rauno Nurger	Levitec Huesca	28
34	(United States) Junior Robinson (2)	Sáenz Horeca Araberri	38
Q1	(Spain) Álex Reyes	Carramimbre CBC Valladolid	28
Q2	(Nigeria) Caleb Agada	Club Melilla Baloncesto	34
Q3	(Spain) Sergio de la Fuente (2)	Carramimbre CBC Valladolid	30
Q4	(Nigeria) Caleb Agada (2)	Club Melilla Baloncesto	41
Q5	(Spain) Sergio de la Fuente (3)	Carramimbre CBC Valladolid	26

Source: FEB
