= CB Agustinos Eras =

Agustinos Eras
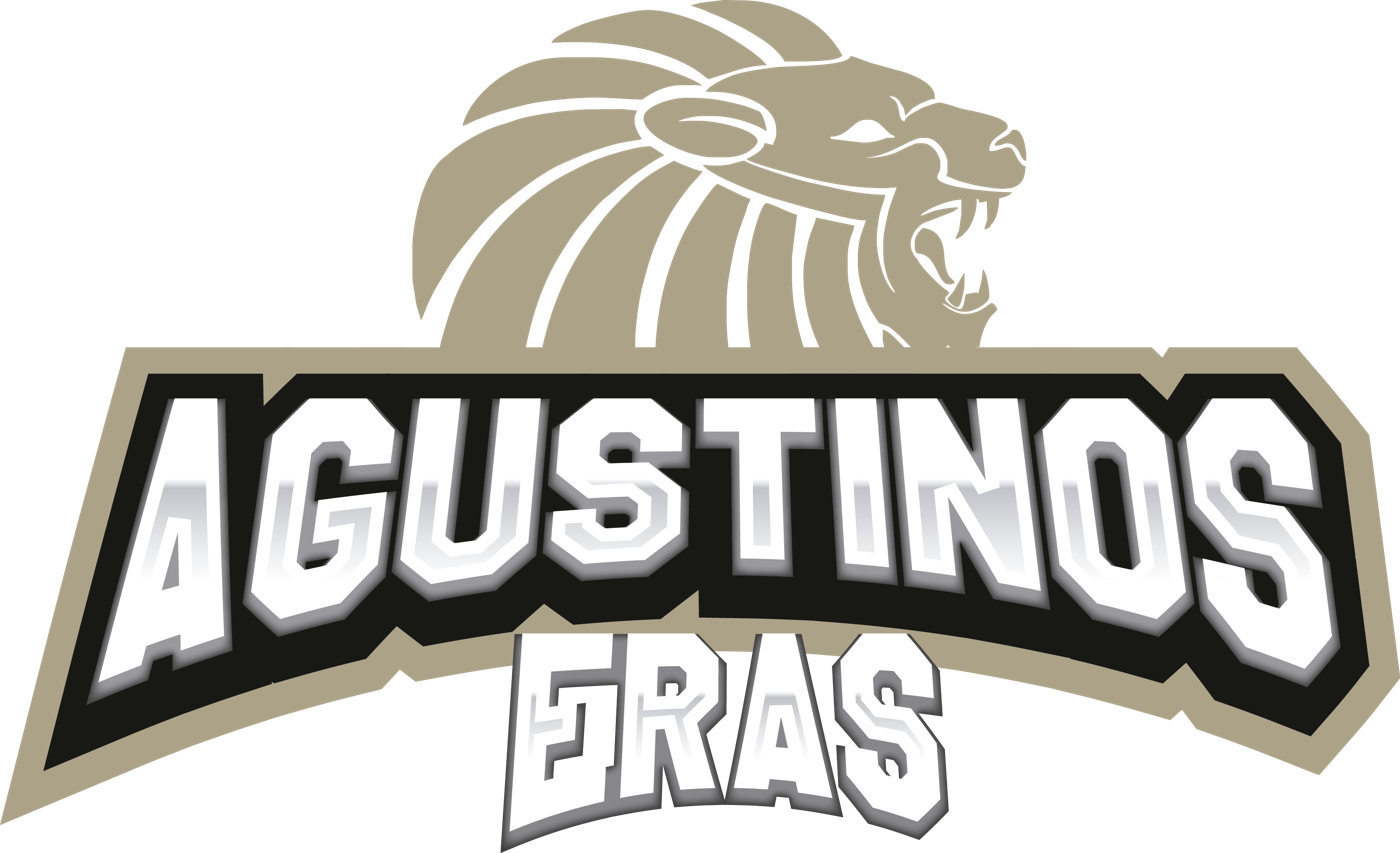
- Leagues: LEB Plata
- Founded: 2007
- Arena: Palacio de los Deportes
- Capacity: 5,188
- Location: León, Spain
- Team colors: White and red
- President: Miguel Ángel Rodríguez
- Head coach: Jorge Álvarez Sierra
- Website: agustinoseras.com
Home	Away

Club Baloncesto Agustinos Eras, also known as Agustinos Leclerc by sponsorship reasons, is a basketball club based in León, Castile and León that currently plays in LEB Plata, the third tier of Spanish basketball.

== History ==
Agustinos Eras was founded in 2007 as a merge of two schools of León (Colegio Agustinos and IES Eras de Renueva) and starts being an affiliated team of Baloncesto León.

In 2010 the club separates from Baloncesto León and two years later joins the Primera División (fifth tier). The club promoted to Liga EBA in its first attempt, in 2013, by winning the Primera División group of Castile of León and finishing as runner-up in the promotion playoffs.

Since its debut in EBA, the club always qualified to the promotion playoffs to LEB Plata, but never achieved its target. In July 2016, after its third attempt, Agustinos Eras achieved a vacant berth to play in this league. For its first season as a professional club, Ángel Jareño, former manager of Baloncesto León, was appointed to be the head coach of the team.

== Sponsorship naming ==
- Agustinos Eras E.Leclerc 2013–2014
- Agustinos Leclerc 2014–

== Season by season ==
Season	Tier	Division	Pos.	W–L
2010–11	6	Sénior Prov.	2nd	12–6
2011–12	6	Sénior Prov.	3rd	13–7
2012–13	5	1ª División	1st	19–1
2013–14	4	Liga EBA	2nd	18–7
2014–15	4	Liga EBA	1st	26–3
2015–16	4	Liga EBA	1st (Note: Achieved a vacant berth in LEB Plata.)	19–6
2016–17	3	LEB Plata	11th	13–17
2017–18	3	LEB Plata	15th	10–20
2018–19	4	Liga EBA	14th	1–25
2019–20	5	1ª División		
