= 2015–16 Liga EBA season =

22nd season of the Liga EBA

Liga EBA
- Season: 2015–16
- Teams: 86

Regular season
- Promoted: Torrons Vicens L'Hospitalet; Seguros Solíss Alcázar Basket; Hispagan UPB Gandia; Arcos Albacete Basket

The 2015–16 Liga EBA season is the 22nd edition of the Liga EBA. This is the fourth division of Spanish basketball. Four teams will be promoted to LEB Plata. The regular season will start in October 2015 and will finish in March 2016. The Final Stage to LEB Plata will be in April 2016.

== Format ==
=== Regular season ===
Teams are divided in five groups by geographical criteria. Groups A, C and D are divided in two.

- Group A–A: Cantabria, Basque Country, La Rioja, Navarre and Castile and León.
- Group A–B: Galicia, Asturias and Castile and León.
- Group B: Community of Madrid, Castile-La Mancha and Canary Islands.
- Groups C–A and C–B: Catalonia and Balearic Islands.
- Group D–A: Andalusia and Melilla.
- Group D–B: Andalusia and Extremadura.
- Group E: Valencian Community and Region of Murcia.

=== Final stage ===
The three best teams of each group and the fourth of Group D (champion of the previous season) will play the Final Stage. From these 16 teams, only four will be promoted to LEB Plata. The winner of each group can organize a group stage.

The Final Stage will be played round-robin format in groups of four teams where the first qualified of each group will host one of the stages.

== Regular season ==
=== Group A–A ===
Pos	Team	Pld	W	L	PF	PA	PD	Pts	Qualification or relegation
1	Megacalzado Ardoi	26	20	6	1926	1801	+125	46	Qualification to the Final Stage
2	CB Santurtzi SK	26	19	7	1964	1697	+267	45	
3	Igualatorio Cantabria Estela	26	19	7	2158	1791	+367	45	
4	Pas Piélagos	26	17	9	2182	2035	+147	43	
5	Easo Loquillo	26	16	10	1752	1746	+6	42	
6	CB Clavijo B	26	14	12	1932	1961	−29	40	
7	La Gallofa & Co	26	14	12	1982	1925	+57	40	
8	TAKE Tolosa	26	13	13	1739	1703	+36	39	
9	Mondragón Unibersitatea	26	11	15	1817	1814	+3	37	
10	Universidad de Valladolid	26	11	15	1879	1936	−57	37	
11	Lehioak Zarautz ZKE	26	8	18	1697	1948	−251	34	
12	CB La Flecha	26	7	19	1678	1882	−204	33	Relegation to Primera División
13	Grupo de Santiago Automoción	26	7	19	1849	2125	−276	33	Relegation to Primera División
14	Baloncesto Venta de Baños	26	6	20	1906	2097	−191	32	Relegation to Primera División

Source: Liga EBA

=== Group A–B ===
Pos	Team	Pld	W	L	PF	PA	PD	Pts	Qualification or relegation
1	Agustinos Leclerc	22	18	4	1750	1551	+199	40	Qualification to the Final Stage
2	HiLed Queso Zamorano	22	18	4	1825	1535	+290	40	Qualification to the Final Stage
3	Pozo Sotón BVM2012	22	15	7	1737	1574	+163	37	
4	Marca de Garantía Chorizo Zamorano	22	15	7	1767	1703	+64	37	
5	ULE ALN Fundación Baloncesto León	22	11	11	1679	1664	+15	33	
6	Cálidos Gallego COB	22	11	11	1585	1595	−10	33	
7	Estudiantes Lugo Leyma Natura	22	10	12	1647	1629	+18	32	
8	Baloncesto Narón	22	10	12	1662	1696	−34	32	
9	CB Chantada	22	7	15	1439	1558	−119	29	
10	Instituto Rosalía de Castro	22	6	16	1441	1626	−185	28	
11	Santo Domingo Betanzos	22	6	16	1463	1650	−187	28	Relegation to Primera División
12	Real Grupo de Cultura Covadonga	22	5	17	1559	1773	−214	27	Relegation to Primera División

Source: Liga EBA

=== Group B ===
Pos	Team	Pld	W	L	PF	PA	PD	Pts	Qualification or relegation
1	Arcos Albacete Basket	26	21	5	2016	1801	+215	47	Qualification to the Final Stage
2	Globalcaja Quintanar	26	18	8	1957	1751	+206	44	Qualification to the Final Stage
3	Seguros Soliss Alcázar Basket	26	18	8	1990	1847	+143	44	Qualification to the Final Stage
4	Isover Basket Azuqueca	26	16	10	1901	1884	+17	42	
5	Náutico KIA Tenerife	26	16	10	1907	1857	+50	42	
6	Real Madrid B	26	16	10	1694	1569	+125	42	
7	Real Canoe NC	26	14	12	1848	1794	+54	40	
8	Gran Canaria B	26	11	15	1842	1860	−18	37	
9	Movistar Estudiantes B	26	10	16	1730	1915	−185	36	
10	HM Torrelodones	26	10	16	1780	1907	−127	36	
11	Fundación Globalcaja La Roda	26	10	16	1921	1917	+4	36	
12	Euroconsult Alcobendas	26	8	18	1943	2090	−147	34	
13	CB Villarrobledo	26	8	18	1839	1998	−159	34	
14	Eurocolegio Casvi	26	6	20	1778	1956	−178	32	

Source: Liga EBA

=== Group C–A ===
Pos	Team	Pld	W	L	PF	PA	PD	Pts	Qualification
1	Recambios Gaudí CB Mollet	18	14	4	1357	1194	+163	32	Qualification to Group C–1
2	CB Quart Germans Cruz	18	14	4	1432	1158	+274	32	Qualification to Group C–1
3	Multiópticas CB Salt	18	11	7	1202	1139	+63	29	Qualification to Group C–1
4	JAC Sants	18	11	7	1305	1373	−68	29	Qualification to Group C–1
5	CB Cornellà	18	9	9	1152	1183	−31	27	Qualification to Group C–1
6	Baricentro Barberà	18	9	9	1246	1213	+33	27	Qualification to Group C–2
7	Vive El Masnou	18	8	10	1258	1249	+9	26	Qualification to Group C–2
8	Arenys Bàsquet Joventut	18	7	11	1194	1232	−38	25	Qualification to Group C–2
9	Sabadell Sant Nicolau	18	6	12	1285	1363	−78	24	Qualification to Group C–2
10	Menorca Talaiótica CCE Sant Lluís (Note: Menorca Talaiótica CCE Sant Lluís deducted 1 point.)	18	1	17	943	1270	−327	18	Qualification to Group C–2

Source: Liga EBA

=== Group C–B ===
Pos	Team	Pld	W	L	PF	PA	PD	Pts	Qualification
1	Torrons Vicens CB L'Hospitalet	18	18	0	1400	1105	+295	36	Qualification to the Group C–1
2	Aracena AEC Collblanc	18	12	6	1271	1202	+69	30	Qualification to the Group C–1
3	Physic CB Igualada	18	10	8	1270	1299	−29	28	Qualification to the Group C–1
4	Ciutat de Les Roses CBS	18	10	8	1327	1301	+26	28	Qualification to the Group C–1
5	BBA Castelldefels	18	8	10	1208	1241	−33	26	Qualification to the Group C–1
6	Grupo Juaneda Miramar	18	8	10	1386	1369	+17	26	Qualification to Group C–2
7	MoraBanc Andorra B	18	7	11	1194	1260	−66	25	Qualification to Group C–2
8	BC Martorell Solvin	18	6	12	1135	1194	−59	24	Qualification to Group C–2
9	Flor de Vimbodí Pardinyes Lleida	18	6	12	1291	1417	−126	24	Qualification to Group C–2
10	CB Castellbisbal	18	5	13	1243	1337	−94	23	Qualification to Group C–2

Source: Liga EBA

=== Group C–1 ===
Pos	Team	Pld	W	L	PF	PA	PD	Pts	Qualification
1	Torrons Vicens CB L'Hospitalet	18	16	2	1379	1170	+209	34	Qualification to the Final Stage
2	Aracena AEC Collblanc	18	13	5	1316	1170	+146	31	Qualification to the Final Stage
3	CB Quart Germans Cruz	18	11	7	1335	1264	+71	29	Qualification to the Final Stage
4	Recambios Gaudí CB Mollet	18	10	8	1333	1258	+75	28	
5	Ciutat de Les Roses CBS	18	9	9	1302	1320	−18	27	
6	Multiópticas CB Salt	18	8	10	1212	1250	−38	26	
7	BBA Castelldefels	18	7	11	1148	1222	−74	25	
8	Physic CB Igualada	18	7	11	1245	1325	−80	25	
9	JAC Sants	18	6	12	1278	1434	−156	24	
10	CB Cornellà	18	3	15	1167	1302	−135	21	

Source: Liga EBA

=== Group C–2 ===
Pos	Team	Pld	W	L	PF	PA	PD	Pts
1	Grupo Juaneda Miramar	18	12	6	1418	1325	+93	30
2	Baricentro Barberà	18	11	7	1302	1202	+100	29
3	Vive El Masnou	18	11	7	1338	1267	+71	29
4	CB Castellbisbal	18	10	8	1333	1294	+39	28
5	BC Martorell Solvin	18	10	8	1263	1243	+20	28
6	MoraBanc Andorra B	18	10	8	1298	1262	+36	28
7	Flor de Vimbodí Pardinyes Lleida	18	10	8	1337	1323	+14	28
8	Arenys Bàsquet Joventut	18	8	10	1254	1252	+2	26
9	Sabadell Sant Nicolau	18	8	10	1377	1388	−11	26
10	Menorca Talaiótica CCE Sant Lluís	18	0	18	1072	1436	−364	18

Source: Liga EBA

=== Group D–A ===
Pos	Team	Pld	W	L	PF	PA	PD	Pts	Qualification
1	Medacbasket	14	11	3	980	925	+55	25	Qualification to second stage
2	CB Deportivo Coín	14	9	5	1104	1032	+72	23	Qualification to second stage
3	Smurfit Kappa Bball Córdoba	14	9	5	1044	948	+96	23	Qualification to second stage
4	CB Andújar Jaén Paraíso Interior	14	8	6	1035	1014	+21	22	Qualification 7th to 12th position group
5	CB Cazorla Jaén Paraíso Interior	14	5	9	998	1087	−89	19	Qualification 7th to 12th position group
6	CB Vélez	14	5	9	943	1021	−78	19	Qualification 7th to 12th position group
7	CAM Enrique Soler	14	5	9	1012	1069	−57	19	Qualification to relegation group
8	CB Novaschool	14	4	10	931	951	−20	18	Qualification to relegation group

Source: Liga EBA

=== Group D–B ===
Pos	Team	Pld	W	L	PF	PA	PD	Pts	Qualification
1	Cintra Plasencia	14	12	2	1102	945	+157	26	Qualification to second stage
2	Unión Linense Baloncesto	14	10	4	1160	1008	+152	24	Qualification to second stage
3	Cycle CB San Juan	14	9	5	1085	1068	+17	23	Qualification to second stage
4	DKV San Fernando	14	8	6	1003	991	+12	22	Qualification 7th to 12th position group
5	Huelva	14	7	7	966	1013	−47	21	Qualification 7th to 12th position group
6	Baloncesto Badajoz	14	5	9	994	1064	−70	19	Qualification 7th to 12th position group
7	Alba Informática CB Utrera	14	3	11	886	998	−112	17	Qualification to relegation group
8	Baloncesto Sevilla B	14	2	12	925	1034	−109	16	Qualification to relegation group

Source: Liga EBA

=== Group D (Second stage) ===
Pos	Team	Pld	W	L	PF	PA	PD	Pts	Qualification
1	CB Deportivo Coín	10	6	4	814	775	+39	16	Qualification the group playoffs
2	Cintra Plasencia	10	6	4	744	736	+8	16	Qualification the group playoffs
3	Smurfit Kappa Bball Córdoba	10	6	4	691	660	+31	16	Qualification the group playoffs
4	Unión Linense Baloncesto	10	6	4	808	736	+72	16	Qualification the group playoffs
5	Medacbasket	10	4	6	691	725	−34	14	Qualification the group playoffs
6	Cycle CB San Juan	10	2	8	752	868	−116	12	Qualification the group playoffs

Source: Liga EBA

=== Group D (7th to 12th position group) ===
Pos	Team	Pld	W	L	PF	PA	PD	Pts	Qualification
1	CB Cazorla Jaén Paraíso Interior	10	6	4	795	766	+29	16	Qualification the group playoffs
2	DKV San Fernando	10	6	4	781	744	+37	16	Qualification the group playoffs
3	CB Andújar Jaén Paraíso Interior	10	5	5	716	746	−30	15	
4	CB Vélez	10	5	5	690	701	−11	15	
5	Huelva	10	4	6	701	721	−20	14	
6	Baloncesto Badajoz	10	4	6	732	737	−5	14	

Source: Liga EBA

=== Playoff ===
The four winners of the quarterfinals will qualify to the Final Stage.

Team 1	Agg.	Team 2	1st leg	2nd leg
DKV San Fernando	146–153	CB Deportivo Coín	85–73	61–80
CB Cazorla Jaén Paraíso Interior	147–164	Cintra Plasencia	89–81	58–83
Cycle CB San Juan	164–172	Smurfit Kappa Bball Córdoba	95–91	69–81
Medacbasket	144–145	Unión Linense Baloncesto	80–70	64–75

=== Final Four ===
Semifinals
CB Deportivo Coín	86
Unión Linense Baloncesto	93
Cintra Plasencia	75
Smurfit Kappa Bball Córdoba	70

Final
Cintra Plasencia	80
Unión Linense Baloncesto	71
Third place
Smurfit Kappa Bball Córdoba	77
CB Deportivo Coín	83

=== Group D (Relegation group) ===
Pos	Team	Pld	W	L	PF	PA	PD	Pts	Relegation
1	CAM Enrique Soler	6	6	0	456	390	+66	12	
2	Alba Informática CB Utrera	6	4	2	397	392	+5	10	Relegation to Primera División
3	CB Novaschool	6	2	4	368	374	−6	8	Relegation to Primera División
4	Baloncesto Sevilla B	6	0	6	370	435	−65	6	Relegation to Primera División

Source: Liga EBA

=== Group E ===
Pos	Team	Pld	W	L	PF	PA	PD	Pts	Qualification
1	Hispagan UPB Gandia	18	17	1	1366	1133	+233	35	Qualification to group E–1
2	BeHappy2 CB Myrtia	18	13	5	1332	1191	+141	31	Qualification to group E–1
3	CB Jovens Almàssera	18	13	5	1337	1218	+119	31	Qualification to group E–1
4	Valencia BC B	18	12	6	1346	1244	+102	30	Qualification to group E–1
5	Power Electronics Paterna	18	10	8	1227	1238	−11	28	Qualification to group E–1
6	L'Alfàs PN Serra Gelada	18	7	11	1223	1300	−77	25	Qualification to group E–2
7	UCAM Murcia B	18	7	11	1186	1240	−54	25	Qualification to group E–2
8	Servigroup Benidorm	18	6	12	1236	1243	−7	24	Qualification to group E–2
9	CB Puerto Sagunto	18	3	15	1104	1378	−274	21	Qualification to group E–2
10	UPTC Basket Cartagena	18	2	16	1206	1378	−172	20	Qualification to group E–2

Source: Liga EBA

=== Group E–1 ===
Pos	Team	Pld	W	L	PF	PA	PD	Pts	Qualification
1	Hispagan UPB Gandia	16	13	3	1248	1094	+154	29	Qualification to the final stage
2	Valencia BC B	16	9	7	1173	1197	−24	25	Qualification to the final stage
3	BeHappy2 CB Myrtia	16	9	7	1224	1153	+71	25	Qualification to the final stage
4	CB Jovens Almàssera	16	6	10	1107	1197	−90	22	
5	Power Electronics Paterna	16	3	13	1122	1233	−111	19	

Updated to match(es) played on unknown. Source: Liga EBA

=== Group E–2 ===
Pos	Team	Pld	W	L	PF	PA	PD	Pts
1	L'Alfàs PN Serra Gelada	16	11	5	1177	1140	+37	27
2	UCAM Murcia B	16	10	6	1122	1069	+53	26
3	Servigroup Benidorm	16	9	7	1219	1153	+66	25
4	UPTC Basket Cartagena	16	6	10	1174	1204	−30	22
5	CB Puerto Sagunto	16	4	12	1090	1216	−126	20

Updated to match(es) played on unknown. Source: Liga EBA

== Promotion playoffs ==
The 16 qualified teams will be divided in four groups of four teams. The first qualified teams will host the groups, played with a round-robin format. They will be played from 20 to 22 May 2016.

The winner of each group will promote to LEB Plata.

=== Group 1 – L'Hospitalet de Llobregat ===
Pos	Grp	Team	Pld	W	L	PF	PA	PD	Pts	Promotion
1	C1	Torrons Vicens CB L'Hospitalet (P)	3	3	0	231	178	+53	6	Promotion to LEB Plata
2	B2	Globalcaja Quintanar	3	2	1	199	188	+11	5	
3	A3	HiLed Queso Zamorano	3	1	2	207	196	+11	4	
4	D2	Unión Linense Baloncesto	3	0	3	153	228	−75	3	

Source: Liga EBA
(P) Promoted

20 May 2016

Boxscore

Globalcaja Quintanar	69–52	Unión Linense Baloncesto

20 May 2016

Boxscore

Torrons Vicens CB L'Hospitalet	75–68	HiLed Queso Zamorano

21 May 2016

Boxscore

HiLed Queso Zamorano	63–67	Globalcaja Quintanar

21 May 2016

Boxscore

Torrons Vicens CB L'Hospitalet	83–47	Unión Linense Baloncesto

22 May 2016

Boxscore

Unión Linense Baloncesto	54–76	HiLed Queso Zamorano

22 May 2016

Boxscore

Torrons Vicens CB L'Hospitalet	73–63	Globalcaja Quintanar

=== Group 2 – Plasencia ===
Pos	Grp	Team	Pld	W	L	PF	PA	PD	Pts	Promotion
1	B3	Seguros Soliss Alcázar Basket (P)	3	3	0	250	192	+58	6	Promotion to LEB Plata
2	C2	Aracena AEC Collblanc	3	2	1	178	179	−1	5	
3	E2	Valencia BC B	3	1	2	217	215	+2	4	
4	D1	Cintra Plasencia	3	0	3	169	230	−61	3	

Source: Liga EBA
(P) Promoted

20 May 2016

Boxscore

Seguros Soliss Alcázar Basket	73–66	Aracena AEC Collblanc

20 May 2016

Boxscore

Cintra Plasencia	69–85	Valencia BC B

21 May 2016

Boxscore

Cintra Plasencia	54–93	Seguros Soliss Alcázar Basket

21 May 2016

Boxscore

Aracena AEC Collblanc	62–60	Valencia BC B

22 May 2016

Boxscore

Valencia BC B	72–84	Seguros Soliss Alcázar Basket

22 May 2016

Boxscore

Cintra Plasencia	46–52	Aracena AEC Collblanc

=== Group 3 – Gandia ===
Pos	Grp	Team	Pld	W	L	PF	PA	PD	Pts	Promotion
1	E1	Hispagan UPB Gandia (P)	3	2	1	231	209	+22	5	Promotion to LEB Plata
2	C3	CB Quart Germans Cruz	3	2	1	215	207	+8	5	
3	D3	CB Deportivo Coín	3	1	2	214	236	−22	4	
4	A2	Megacalzado Ardoi	3	1	2	194	202	−8	4	

Source: Liga EBA
(P) Promoted

20 May 2016

Boxscore

CB Deportivo Coín	71–63	Megacalzado Ardoi

20 May 2016

Boxscore

Hispagan UPB Gandia	82–60	CB Quart Germans Cruz

21 May 2016

Boxscore

Megacalzado Ardoi	69–72	CB Quart Germans Cruz

21 May 2016

Boxscore

Hispagan UPB Gandia	90–77	CB Deportivo Coín

22 May 2016

Boxscore

CB Quart Germans Cruz	83–66	CB Deportivo Coín

22 May 2016

Boxscore

Hispagan UPB Gandia	59–72	Megacalzado Ardoi

=== Group 4 – León ===
Pos	Grp	Team	Pld	W	L	PF	PA	PD	Pts	Promotion
1	B1	Arcos Albacete Basket (P)	3	3	0	237	198	+39	6	Promotion to LEB Plata
2	E3	BeHappy2 CB Myrtia	3	2	1	223	212	+11	5	
3	A1	Agustinos Leclerc	3	1	2	197	226	−29	4	
4	D4	Smurfit Kappa Bball Córdoba	3	0	3	171	192	−21	3	

Source: Liga EBA
(P) Promoted

20 May 2016

Boxscore

Arcos Albacete Basket	80–69	BeHappy2 CB Myrtia

20 May 2016

Boxscore

Agustinos Leclerc	59–48	Smurfit Kappa Bball Córdoba

21 May 2016

Boxscore

Arcos Albacete Basket	74–65	Smurfit Kappa Bball Córdoba

21 May 2016

Boxscore

Agustinos Leclerc	74–95	BeHappy2 CB Myrtia

22 May 2016

Boxscore

BeHappy2 CB Myrtia	59–58	Smurfit Kappa Bball Córdoba

22 May 2016

Boxscore

Agustinos Leclerc	64–83	Arcos Albacete Basket
