= Petar Radojičić =

Serbian basketball player

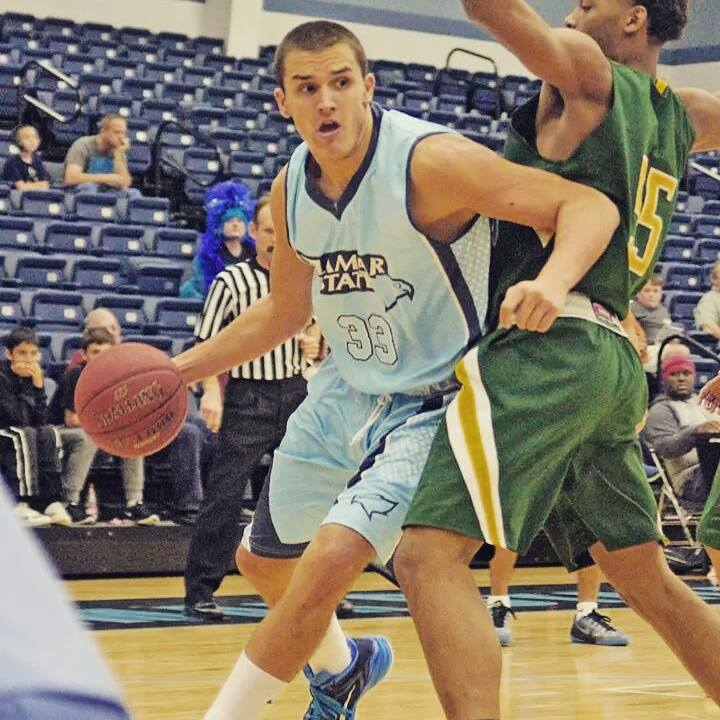

No. 41 – Baskonia
- Position: Power forward / center
- League: LEB Plata

Personal information
- Born: May 17, 1994 (age 32) Ljubovija, Serbia, FR Yugoslavia
- Listed height: 2.05 m (6 ft 9 in)
- Listed weight: 105 kg (231 lb)

Career information
- College: LSCPA (2014–2016); St. Mary's University (2017–2019)
- NBA draft: 2018: undrafted
- Playing career: 2012–present

Career history
- 2012–2014: Sloboda Užice
- 2019-2020: Cantbasket 04
- 2020-2021: CP La Roda
- 2021-2022: Baskonia

Petar Radojičić (born May 17, 1994) is a Serbian basketball player. He plays the power forward and center position. Currently with the team Club Deportivo Saski-Baskonia, S.A.D.,

== Early career ==
Radojičić began his career in small town in Ljubovija, where he played for youth selections of KK Mladost. After two years, he decided to join another team and move to a larger city to continue playing basketball. He never signed a professional contract, because he decided to finish his education first. He moved in Užice to play club basketball in that city. After spending 4 years in Užice, he decided to continue his basketball career and education in The United States. In 2014 he went to college Lamar State College Port Arthur. He has recently transferred to Texas State University-San Marcos. After transferring to Texas State University, after just one month, he decides to transfer to St. Mary's University in San Antonio. Petar spent there last season and he is currently in the same place.

== College career ==
In his first season (2014–15) in LSCPA, he averaged 4.9 points per game with the FG percentage shot 65.3% and also averaged 2.9 rebounds per game. In his second season in LSCPA, he played only six games because of a back injury and averaged 2.5 points and 2.8 rebounds per game.

In 2016-17 season, he is currently playing the best season of his career where in 30 games averaging 16 points per game with the FG percentage shot 65.1% and also averaging 10.2 rebounds per game. Radojičić was one of five named to the region's second-team honorees after leading Region 14 in rebounds with 10.2 boards per game overall and 10.8 rebounds a game in league contests. The sophomore also finished third in the region in field goal percentage, shooting at a 61.5 percent clip. Also he started in every game for the Hawks. He scored 24 points twice in league games, against eventual conference champion San Jacinto College and Coastal Bend College on back-to-back dates to close out the regular season. His best games on the boards came against Blinn College on January 28, 2017 when he pulled down 17 rebounds, 13 of those coming on the defensive end. He had 14-rebound performances twice in conference and three 13-rebound league games.

In 2017-18 season, in his junior season for St.Mary's University he started in all 28 games played. Averaged 26 minutes of playing time. Led the team in points with 375 points overall, averaging 14.3 points per game with FG percentage shot 55% and free trows percentage was 73% . Petar also led the team with 174 rebounds, averaging 6.2 rebound per game. To go along with 18 assists, nine steals and 12 blocks for the season. His best scoring game was against Roger State with 26 points, and best rebounding game was against Oklahoma Christian with 12 rebounds.
