= Palacio Municipal de Deportes de Granada =

Basketball arena in Granada, Spain

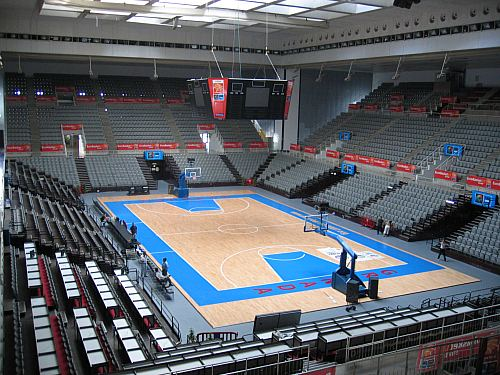
- Interactive map of Palacio Municipal de Deportes de Granada
- Location: Avenida de Salvador Allende S/ N, 18008 Granada, Spain
- Coordinates: 37°9′14.93″N 3°35′43.01″W
- Capacity: 9,507 Basketball
- Record attendance: 9,390 (CB Granada vs DKV Joventut, 12 January 2008)

Construction
- Opened: 1991

Tenants
- CB Granada (basketball) (1994–2011); Fundación CB Granada (2015–present)

Palacio Municipal de Deportes de Granada is an arena in Granada, Spain. Opened in 1991, the arena holds 9,507 people and it is primarily used for basketball and the home arena of Fundación CB Granada, since 2015. The arena hosted the 1999 UEFA Futsal Championship and the Group A in EuroBasket 2007.

In 2014, the arena hosted the Group of Spain in the 2014 FIBA Basketball World Cup.

== Events hosted ==
- 1999 UEFA Futsal Championship
- EuroBasket 2007
- 2014 FIBA Basketball World Cup
- 2015 Winter Universiade

== Attendances ==
This is a list of league games attendances at Palacio de Deportes.

Season	Total	High	Low	Average
CB Granada
2004–05 ACB	115,983	8,105	5,700	6,823
2005–06 ACB	118,934	8,320	6,310	6,996
2006–07 ACB	120,394	8,047	6,251	7,082
2007–08 ACB	127,477	9,390	6,550	7,499
2008–09 ACB	118,508	9,000	6,750	7,407
2009–10 ACB	109,953	7,895	5,250	6,468
2010–11 ACB	101,803	7,095	1,500	5,358
Fundación CB Granada
2015–16 Plata	41,949	4,286	2,017	2,996
2016–17 Plata	67,235	6,018	2,512	3,539
2017–18 Plata	57,898	5,492	3,012	3,860
2018–19 Oro	76,745	5,187	1,989	4,039
2019–20 Oro (Note: Season suspended due to the COVID-19 pandemic.)	40,082	4,417	2,369	3,340
2020–21 Oro	Season played under limited attendance			
2021–22 Oro	63,787	8,383	2,369	3,752
2022–23 ACB	111,878	8,319	5,247	6,581
2023–24 ACB	127,126	8,336	6,172	7,478

== See also ==
- List of indoor arenas in Spain

Preceded by Vista Alegre; Córdoba	UEFA Futsal Championship; Final Venue; 1999	Succeeded by Luzhniki; Moscow
