= Pere Tomàs =

Spanish basketball player (born 1989)

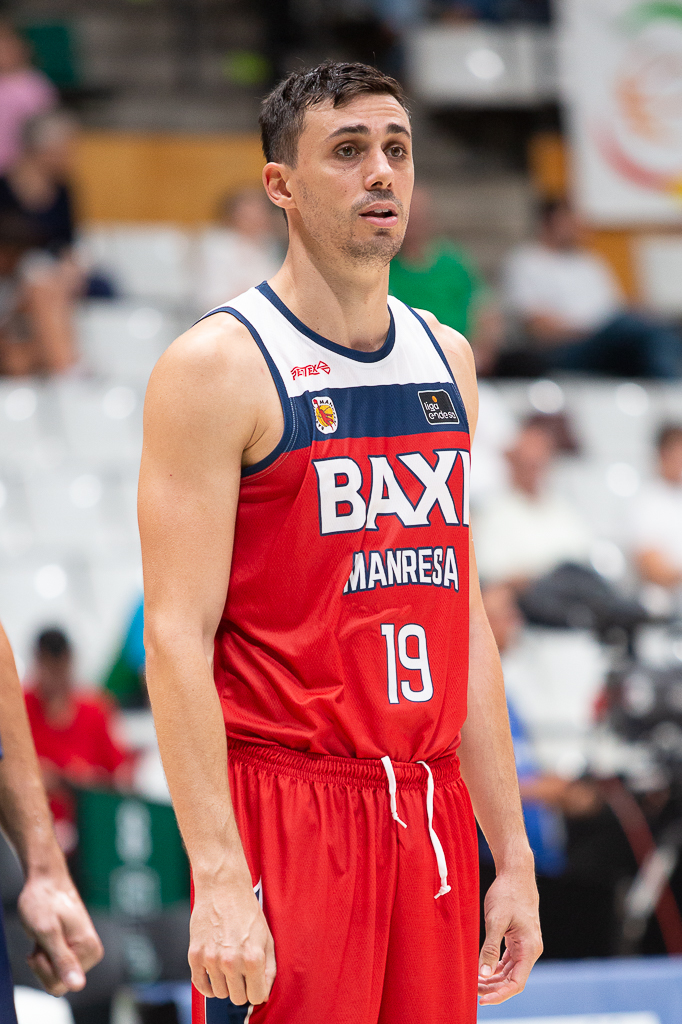
- Tomàs, with Manresa in 2019

No. 19 – Covirán Granada
- Position: Small forward
- League: Liga ACB

Personal information
- Born: 5 September 1989 (age 37) Llucmajor, Spain
- Listed height: 2.02 m (6 ft 8 in)
- Listed weight: 91 kg (201 lb)

Career information
- Playing career: 2007–present

Career history
- 2007–2013: Joventut
- 2007–2008: →Prat
- 2013–2016: Zaragoza
- 2016–2017: Manresa
- 2017–2018: Bilbao
- 2018–2020: Manresa
- 2020–2022: Gipuzkoa Basket
- 2022–present: Granada

Pere Tomàs (born 5 September 1989) is a Spanish professional basketball player for Granada of the Liga ACB.

== Professional career ==
Tomàs signed with ICL Manresa on August 5, 2016.

On August 9, 2022, he signed with Covirán Granada of the Spanish Liga ACB.

== Euroleague career statistics ==
Legend
GP	Games played	GS	Games started	MPG	Minutes per game
FG%	Field-goal percentage	3P%	3-point field-goal percentage	FT%	Free-throw percentage
RPG	Rebounds per game	APG	Assists per game	SPG	Steals per game
BPG	Blocks per game	PPG	Points per game	PIR	Performance index rating
**Bold**	Career high

Year	Team	GP	GS	MPG	FG%	3P%	FT%	RPG	APG	SPG	BPG	PPG	PIR
2008–09	Joventut	9	1	8.7	.500	.625	.333	1.2	.3	.4	.1	2.3	2.7
