= Juan Jose García =

Dominican basketball player

No. 11 – Aix Maurienne Savoie Basket
- Position: Power forward / center
- League: Pro B

Personal information
- Born: April 22, 1989 (age 37) Santo Domingo, Dominican Republic
- Listed height: 6 ft 7 in (2.01 m)
- Listed weight: 201 lb (91 kg)

Career information
- NBA draft: 2011: undrafted
- Playing career: 2008–present

Career history
- 2008–2013: C.B. Eurocolegio Casvi
- 2013–2015: Oviedo CB
- 2015: Basket Zaragoza
- 2015–2016: Bàsquet Manresa
- 2016–2017: Unicaja Baloncesto Malaga
- 2017–2021: AB Castelló
- 2021–present: Aix Maurienne Savoie Basket

Juan Jose García Rodriguez (born 22 April 1989) is a Dominican professional basketball player. He plays for the Dominican national basketball team and Aix Maurienne Savoie Basket.

== Professional career ==
García played for the C.B. Eurocolegio Casvi from 2008 to 2013. He moved to Oviedo CB in the 2013–14 season, he averaged 10.6 point, 6.2 rebounds and 1.6 assists. In the next season at Oviedo CB, he averaged 11.4 points, 6.8 rebounds and 1.7 assists. In 2015, he transferred to Basket Zaragoza, where he played 2 league games. He played the 2015–16 season at Bàsquet Manresa, where he averaged 3.9 points, 3.3 rebounds and 0.5 assist. He moved Unicaja Baloncesto Malaga to in the 2016–17 season, where he appeared in only 2 games of the season. He moved AB Castelló in the 2017–18 season, he averaged 7.5 points, 4.9 rebounds and 1.2 assists. In the 2018–19 season, he averaged 12.6 points, 8.1 rebounds and 2 assists. In the 2019–20 season, he is averaging 9.6 points, 6.3 rebounds and 2.3 assists.

== National team career ==
García played for the Dominican national basketball team at the basketball event in the 2015 Pan American Games, where he averaged 3.3 point, 2 rebound and 0.3 assist. He participated in the 2015 FIBA Americas Championship, where he averaged 6 point, 4 rebound and 0.7 assist. He also played in the 2016 Centrobasket, where he averaged 5.7 points, 3.8 rebound and 1.3 assists. He played in the 2019 FIBA Basketball World Cup in china, where he averaged 0.8 points, 1 rebound and 0.3 assist.
