= 2014–15 Liga EBA season =

21st season of the Liga EBA

Liga EBA
- Season: 2014–15
- Teams: 82

Regular season
- Promoted: Aceitunas Fragata CB Morón; CB Deportivo Coín; Covirán Granada; Giwine CB Andratx

The 2014–15 Liga EBA season was the 21st edition of the Liga EBA. This is the fourth division of Spanish basketball. Four teams will be promoted to LEB Plata. The regular season started in October 2014 and finished in March 2015. Promotion playoffs to LEB Plata were played in April 2015.

== Format ==
=== Regular season ===
Teams are divided in five groups by geographical criteria. Groups A and E is also divided in two. The maximum number of teams in groups A to D was reduced to fourteen. In Group E, ten teams are allowed at sub-group E-A:

- Group A-A: Cantabria, Basque Country, La Rioja and Castile and León.
- Group A-B: Galicia, Asturias and Castile and León.
- Group B: Community of Madrid, Castile-La Mancha and Canary Islands.
- Group C: Catalonia and Aragón.
- Group D: Andalusia, Extremadura and Melilla.
- Sub-group E-A: Valencian Community and Region of Murcia.
- Sub-group E-B: Balearic Islands.

=== Final play-off ===
The three best teams of each group and the fourth of Group A (champion of the previous season) will play the promotion playoffs. From these 16 teams, only four will be promoted to LEB Plata. The winner of each group can organize a group stage.

The final promotion playoffs will be played round-robin format in groups of four teams where the first qualified of each group will host one of the stages.

== Regular season ==
=== Group A-A ===
Pos	Team	Pld	W	L	PF	PA	PD	Pts	Qualification or relegation
1	Easo	26	21	5	1954	1635	+319	47	Qualification to promotion playoffs
2	Megacalzado Ardoi	26	18	8	1875	1768	+107	44	Qualification to promotion playoffs
3	La Gallofa Cantbasket 04	26	17	9	1960	1876	+84	43	
4	Igualatorio Cantabria Estela	26	17	9	1852	1683	+169	43	
5	TAKE Tolosa	26	14	12	1805	1833	−28	40	
6	Natural Rioja Vintage	26	14	12	1879	1910	−31	40	
7	CB Santurtzi SK	26	13	13	1851	1770	+81	39	
8	Universidad de Valladolid	26	13	13	1835	1786	+49	39	
9	Fundación Baloncesto Valladolid	26	12	14	1692	1677	+15	38	
10	Mondragón Unibersitatea	26	10	16	1763	1912	−149	36	
11	Grupo de Automoción Santiago	26	10	16	1810	1931	−121	36	
12	Pas Piélagos	26	9	17	1915	1998	−83	35	Relegation to Primera División
13	Centro de Estudios Mikeldi	26	7	19	1821	2009	−188	33	Relegation to Primera División
14	Askartza Claret	26	7	19	1757	1981	−224	33	Relegation to Primera División

Source: Liga EBA

=== Group A-B ===
Pos	Team	Pld	W	L	PF	PA	PD	Pts	Qualification or relegation
1	Agustinos Leclerc	26	24	2	2065	1653	+412	50	Qualification to promotion playoffs
2	Aquimisa Laboratorios CB Tormes	26	19	7	1903	1740	+163	45	Qualification to promotion playoffs
3	Baloncesto Narón	26	19	7	1986	1851	+135	45	
4	Grupo INEC Queso Zamorano	26	19	7	2025	1875	+150	45	
5	ULE Fundación CB León	26	18	8	2003	1801	+202	44	
6	CB Chantada	26	16	10	1800	1736	+64	42	
7	BVM2012	26	13	13	1935	1990	−55	39	
8	Embutidos Ballesteros	26	11	15	1796	1889	−93	37	
9	Estudiantes Lugo Leyma Natura	26	10	16	1822	1808	+14	36	
10	Baloncesto Venta de Baños	26	8	18	1883	1986	−103	34	
11	Instituto Rosalía de Castro	26	8	18	1840	1958	−118	34	
12	La Sidrería Ferrol CB	26	8	18	1698	1862	−164	34	Relegation to Primera División
13	Santo Domingo Betanzos	26	7	19	1687	1921	−234	33	Relegation to Primera División
14	Leyma Básquet Coruña B	26	2	24	1792	2165	−373	28	Relegation to Primera División

Source: Liga EBA

=== Group B ===
Pos	Team	Pld	W	L	PF	PA	PD	Pts	Qualification or relegation
1	Real Madrid B	26	21	5	1886	1568	+318	47	Qualification to promotion playoffs
2	Albacete Basket	26	19	7	1981	1760	+221	45	Qualification to promotion playoffs
3	Seguros Soliss Alcázar Basket	26	18	8	1987	1853	+134	44	Qualification to promotion playoffs
4	Basket Globalcaja Quintanar	26	18	8	1973	1882	+91	44	
5	Euroconsult Alcobendas	26	15	11	2021	1955	+66	41	
6	Movistar Estudiantes B	26	13	13	1885	1858	+27	39	
7	Tudespensa.com Agrícola CB Villarrobledo	26	12	14	1933	1976	−43	38	
8	Alza Basket Azuqueca	26	12	14	1816	1910	−94	38	
9	Eurocolegio Casvi	26	10	16	1790	1864	−74	36	
10	Real Club Náutico Tenerife	26	9	17	1943	1897	+46	35	
11	Zumosol Alcorcón Basket	26	9	17	1887	2095	−208	35	Relegation to Primera División
12	Covíbar Rivas	26	9	17	1753	1891	−138	35	Relegation to Primera División
13	CB Pozuelo	26	9	17	1863	1992	−129	35	Relegation to Primera División
14	CB McDonald's Tenerife	26	8	18	1729	1956	−227	34	Relegation to Primera División

Source: Liga EBA

=== Group C ===
Pos	Team	Pld	W	L	PF	PA	PD	Pts	Qualification or relegation
1	Aracena AEC Collblanc	26	20	6	2003	1774	+229	46	Qualification to promotion playoffs
2	CB L'Hospitalet	26	19	7	1936	1733	+203	45	Qualification to promotion playoffs
3	Sabadell Sant Nicolau	26	17	9	1895	1785	+110	43	Qualification to promotion playoffs
4	JAC Sants	26	17	9	1930	1838	+92	43	
5	CB Quart Piscines Sant Feliu	26	16	10	2000	1928	+72	42	
6	El Olivar	26	14	12	1921	1887	+34	40	
7	CB Santfeliuenc	26	11	15	1769	1886	−117	37	
8	BC MoraBanc Andorra B	26	11	15	1907	1974	−67	37	
9	Queso Milner Arenys Bàsquet	26	11	15	1809	1802	+7	37	
10	Flor de Vimbodí Pardinyes Lleida	26	11	15	1869	1994	−125	37	
11	Isports Salt	26	10	16	1795	1882	−87	36	Relegation to Primera División
12	CB Cornellà	26	9	17	1927	1951	−24	35	Relegation to Primera División
13	BC Martorell Solvin	26	9	17	1918	2011	−93	35	Relegation to Primera División
14	CB Castelldefels	26	7	19	1811	2045	−234	33	Relegation to Primera División

Source: Liga EBA

=== Group D ===
Pos	Team	Pld	W	L	PF	PA	PD	Pts	Qualification or relegation
1	Aceitunas Fragata Morón	26	22	4	2006	1713	+293	48	Qualification to promotion playoffs
2	CB Deportivo Coín	26	21	5	2124	1886	+238	47	Qualification to promotion playoffs
3	Covirán Granada	26	19	7	2217	1869	+348	45	Qualification to promotion playoffs
4	Bball Córdoba	26	19	7	2041	1826	+215	45	
5	CAM Enrique Soler	26	18	8	2220	2055	+165	44	
6	CB Novaschool	26	11	15	1941	1964	−23	37	
7	Plasencia Extremadura	26	12	14	2045	2053	−8	38	
8	Por Huelva	26	11	15	1849	1927	−78	37	
9	Unicaja B	26	10	16	1789	1977	−188	36	
10	GBP Badajoz	26	10	16	1890	1964	−74	36	
11	CB Cazorla Jaén Paraíso Interior	26	9	17	1817	1911	−94	35	Relegation to Primera División
12	DKV San Fernando	26	9	17	1789	1959	−170	35	Relegation to Primera División
13	CB Andújar Jaén Paraíso Interior	26	7	19	1736	2016	−280	33	Relegation to Primera División
14	Baloncesto Sevilla B	26	4	22	1691	2035	−344	30	Relegation to Primera División

Source: Liga EBA

=== Group E ===
==== Sub-group E-A ====
Pos	Team	Pld	W	L	PF	PA	PD	Pts	Qualification
1	Power Electronics Paterna	18	15	3	1452	1259	+193	33	Qualification to second stage
2	UCAM Murcia B	18	13	5	1257	1169	+88	31	Qualification to second stage
3	Units pel Bàsquet Gandia	18	12	6	1419	1306	+113	30	Qualification to second stage
4	UPTC Basket Cartagena	18	12	6	1357	1303	+54	30	Qualification to second stage
5	Servigroup Benidorm	18	9	9	1240	1197	+43	27	Qualification to relegation group
6	CB Jovens Almàssera	18	8	10	1230	1262	−32	26	Qualification to relegation group
7	Valencia Basket B	18	9	9	1375	1301	+74	27	Qualification to relegation group
8	Meridiano UA Lucentum B	18	5	13	1252	1307	−55	23	Qualification to relegation group
9	Almería Basket	18	4	14	1082	1300	−218	22	Qualification to relegation group
10	Hero Jairis	18	3	15	1044	1304	−260	21	Qualification to relegation group

Source: Liga EBA

==== Sub-group E-B ====
The sub-group E-B, also called EBA Baleares was created as a merge of the Balearic groups of EBA and Primera División. CB Andraitx Giwine and CCE Sant Lluís only played the first half as they qualify to the second stage with the four best teams of the sub-group E-A.

==== Second stage (Group E) ====
Pos	Team	Pld	W	L	PF	PA	PD	Pts	Qualification
1	CB Giwine Andratx	10	8	2	755	673	+82	18	Qualification to promotion playoffs
2	UCAM Murcia B	10	7	3	745	671	+74	17	Qualification to promotion playoffs
3	UPTC Basket Cartagena	10	6	4	734	744	−10	16	Qualification to promotion playoffs
4	Units pel Bàsquet Gandia	10	4	6	728	687	+41	14	
5	Power Electronics Paterna	10	3	7	741	780	−39	13	
6	Menorca Talaiòtica CCE Sant Lluís	10	2	8	616	764	−148	12	

Source: Liga EBA

==== Relegation group (Group E) ====
Games played between teams of this group in the first round are included.

Pos	Team	Pld	W	L	PF	PA	PD	Pts	Relegation
1	Valencia Basket B	20	15	5	1562	1358	+204	35	
2	Servigroup Benidorm	20	14	6	1340	1208	+132	34	
3	CB Jovens Almàssera	20	10	10	1280	1307	−27	30	
4	Almería Basket	20	8	12	1324	1355	−31	28	
5	Meridiano UA Lucentum B	20	8	12	1341	1344	−3	28	Relegation to Primera División
6	Hero Jairis	20	5	15	1156	1431	−275	25	Relegation to Primera División

Source: Liga EBA

== Promotion playoffs ==
The 16 qualified teams will be divided in four groups of four teams. The first qualified teams will host the groups, played with a round-robin format. They will be played from 22 to 24 May 2015.

The winner of each group will promote to LEB Plata.

=== Group 1 – Coín ===
CB Deportivo Coín will organize this group due to the resignation of Real Madrid B to organize it.

Pos	Grp	Team	Pld	W	L	PF	PA	PD	Pts	Promotion
1	D2	CB Deportivo Coín	3	2	1	206	198	+8	5	Promotion to LEB Plata
2	C2	CB L'Hospitalet	3	2	1	211	198	+13	5	
3	A3	Aquimisa Laboratorios CB Tormes	3	1	2	185	212	−27	4	
4	B1	Real Madrid B	3	1	2	223	217	+6	4	

Source: Liga EBA

22 May 2015

Boxscore

Aquimisa Laboratorios CB Tormes	80–77	Real Madrid B

22 May 2015

Boxscore

CB Deportivo Coín	76–69	CB L'Hospitalet

23 May 2015

Boxscore

Aquimisa Laboratorios CB Tormes	57–72	CB L'Hospitalet

23 May 2015

Boxscore

CB Deportivo Coín	67–81	Real Madrid B

24 May 2015

Boxscore

Real Madrid B	65–70	CB L'Hospitalet

24 May 2015

Boxscore

CB Deportivo Coín	63–48	Aquimisa Laboratorios CB Tormes

=== Group 2 – Albacete ===
Albacete Basket will organize this group due to the resignation of Aracena AEC Collblanc to organize it.

Pos	Grp	Team	Pld	W	L	PF	PA	PD	Pts	Promotion
1	D3	Covirán Granada	3	3	0	253	214	+39	6	Promotion to LEB Plata
2	B2	Albacete Basket	3	2	1	231	187	+44	5	
3	E2	UCAM Murcia B	3	1	2	204	211	−7	4	
4	C1	Aracena AEC Collblanc	3	0	3	184	260	−76	3	

Source: Liga EBA

22 May 2015

Boxscore

UCAM Murcia B	60–77	Albacete Basket

22 May 2015

Boxscore

Covirán Granada	105–71	Aracena AEC Collblanc

23 May 2015

Boxscore

UCAM Murcia B	77–66	Aracena AEC Collblanc

23 May 2015

Boxscore

Albacete Basket	76–80	Covirán Granada

24 May 2015

Boxscore

Covirán Granada	68–67	UCAM Murcia B

24 May 2015

Boxscore

Aracena AEC Collblanc	47–78	Albacete Basket

=== Group 3 – Morón de la Frontera ===
Pos	Grp	Team	Pld	W	L	PF	PA	PD	Pts	Promotion
1	D1	Aceitunas Fragata Morón	3	2	1	225	211	+14	5	Promotion to LEB Plata
2	B3	Seguros Soliss Alcázar Basket	3	2	1	215	202	+13	5	
3	E3	UPTC Basket Cartagena	3	1	2	204	221	−17	4	
4	A2	Easo	3	1	2	215	225	−10	4	

Source: Liga EBA

22 May 2015

Boxscore

Easo	64–70	Seguros Soliss Alcázar Basket

22 May 2015

Boxscore

Aceitunas Fragata Morón	74–61	UPTC Basket Cartagena

23 May 2015

Boxscore

UPTC Basket Cartagena	60–76	Seguros Soliss Alcázar Basket

23 May 2015

Boxscore

Aceitunas Fragata Morón	73–80	Easo

24 May 2015

Boxscore

Easo	71–82	UPTC Basket Cartagena

24 May 2015

Boxscore

Aceitunas Fragata Morón	78–69	Seguros Soliss Alcázar Basket

=== Group 4 – Andratx ===
Pos	Grp	Team	Pld	W	L	PF	PA	PD	Pts	Promotion
1	E1	CB Andratx Giwine	3	3	0	247	200	+47	6	Promotion to LEB Plata
2	A1	Agustinos Leclerc	3	2	1	232	217	+15	5	
3	A4	Megacalzado Ardoi	3	1	2	193	229	−36	4	
4	C3	Sabadell Sant Nicolau	3	0	3	199	225	−26	3	

Source: Liga EBA

22 May 2015

Boxscore

Megacalzado Ardoi	52–81	Agustinos Leclerc

22 May 2015

Boxscore

Sabadell Sant Nicolau	60–73	CB Andratx Giwine

23 May 2015

Boxscore

Agustinos Leclerc	76–71	Sabadell Sant Nicolau

23 May 2015

Boxscore

Megacalzado Ardoi	65–80	CB Andratx Giwine

24 May 2015

Boxscore

Sabadell Sant Nicolau	68–76	Megacalzado Ardoi

24 May 2015

Boxscore

CB Andratx Giwine	94–75	Agustinos Leclerc
