= Alcázar Basket =

- Leagues: LEB Plata
- Founded: 2013
- Dissolved: 2017
- Arena: Pabellón Antonio Díaz Miguel
- Capacity: 1,500
- Location: Alcázar de San Juan, Spain
- Team colors: Red and white
Home	Away

Alcázar Basket, also known as Seguros Soliss Alcázar Basket by sponsorship reasons, was a basketball club based in Alcázar de San Juan, Castile-La Mancha.

== History ==
Alcázar Basket was founded in 2013 with the aim to be the main basketball club of the city after the dissolution of Fundación Adepal, who played one season in the second tier.

After three seasons in Liga EBA, the club achieves the promotion to LEB Plata in the 2015–16 season after winning the play-off stage played in Plasencia.

On 17 July 2017, just after finishing their first season in LEB Plata, the club announced it would be dissolved due to the lack of support. The board of directors alleged that in that situation, the project is left over.

== Sponsorship naming ==
- Seguros Soliss Alcázar Basket 2013–2017

== Season by season ==
Season	Tier	Division	Pos.	W–L
2013–14	4	Liga EBA	9th	14–16
2014–15	4	Liga EBA	3rd	20–9
2015–16	4	Liga EBA	3rd	21–8
2016–17	3	LEB Plata	10th	14–16
