= CP La Roda =

JAFEP Fundación Globalcaja La Roda
- Leagues: LEB Plata
- Founded: 1960
- Arena: Juan José Lozano Jareño
- Location: La Roda, Spain
- Team colors: Green, white and black
- Website: cplaroda.com/baloncesto
Home	Away

Club Polideportivo La Roda, also known as JAFEP Fundación Globalcaja La Roda for sponsorship reasons, is the basketball team of the Spanish namesake multi-sports club based in La Roda, Albacete. It currently plays in LEB Plata.

== History ==
In the 1980s, CP La Roda reached for the first time the fourth tier, where it remained during four years before declining.

The club came back years later and started in the Provincial League, coming back finally to Tercera División, fourth tier, in 1989. Four years later, La Roda achieved the promotion to Segunda División, where it played continuously until 2002 (the league changed its name to Primera División in 1999) when the club was relegated to Primera Autonómica. One year later, it came back to Primera División for playing during 12 years before promoting to Liga EBA.

La Roda was relegated again to Primera División in its debut in a national league but remained in the league after the expansion of their group from 14 to 16 teams. In the next season, they ended in the fourth position and qualified for the promotion stage thanks to the resignation of Real Madrid B. Surprisingly, the club achieved the promotion to LEB Plata on 22 May 2017 after winning the three games of the final stage.

In their debut season, the club surprisingly qualified to the Copa LEB Plata by finishing in the second place after the first half of the regular season. It also ended in the second place of the table at the end of this stage, but was quickly eliminated in the promotion playoffs by Real Canoe. Their second season was completely different and La Roda ended in the relegation positions to Liga EBA.

== Season by season ==
Season	Tier	Division	Pos.	W–L	Cup competitions	
1989–90	5	Provincial	1st			
1990–91	4	3ª División	4th	13–11		
1991–92	4	3ª División	3rd	17–9		
1992–93	4	3ª División	3rd	17–7		
1992–93	4	3ª División	1st	19–5		
1993–94	3	2ª División	10th	6–20		
1994–95	3	2ª División	7th	12–12		
1995–96	3	2ª División	11th	8–22		
1996–97	4	2ª División	10th	7–17		
1997–98	4	2ª División	6th	10–12		
1998–99	4	2ª División	7th	10–12		
1999–00	4	1ª División	10th	7–18		
2000–01	5	1ª División	6th	13–13		
2001–02	5	1ª División	12th	8–18		
2002–03	6	1ª Autonómica	1st	20–2		
2003–04	5	1ª División	5th	17–9		
2004–05	5	1ª División	10th	12–18		
2005–06	5	1ª División	2nd	21–9		
2006–07	5	1ª División	12th	10–20		
2007–08	6	1ª División	12th	12–16		
2008–09	6	1ª División	6th	15–11		
2009–10	5	1ª División	5th	16–10		
2010–11	5	1ª División	7th	13–13		
2011–12	5	1ª División	6th	14–12		
2012–13	5	1ª División	4th	17–10		
2013–14	5	1ª División	5th	14–12		
2014–15	5	1ª División	1st	24–4		
2015–16	4	Liga EBA	11th (Note: Remained in the league due to the expansion of the Group B.)	10–16		
2016–17	4	Liga EBA	4th	25–8		
2017–18	3	LEB Plata	6th	23–10	Copa LEB Plata	RU
2018–19	3	LEB Plata	23rd (Note: Remained in the league after achieving a vacant place.)	10–24		
2019–20	3	LEB Plata	21st (Note: Season curtailed due to the COVID-19 pandemic.)	8–17		

== Current roster ==
Note: Flags indicate national team eligibility at FIBA-sanctioned events. Players may hold other non-FIBA nationalities not displayed.

CP La Roda roster
Players
Coaches

Pos.	No.	Nat.	Name	Ht.	Age
SF	12	(Dominican Republic)	Adón, Gregorio	2.00 m (6 ft 7 in)	33 – 12 April 1991
C	1	(France)	Benavid, Thibault	2.06 m (6 ft 9 in)	28 – 7 June 1996
PF	7	(Spain)	Burgos, Antonio	2.02 m (6 ft 8 in)	24 – 27 November 2000
SG	9	(Spain)	Córdoba, Pablo	1.88 m (6 ft 2 in)	27 – 24 October 1997
C	2	(Chad)	Djimassal, Bienvenue	2.05 m (6 ft 9 in)	31 – 10 September 1993
SG	3	(United States)	Hughes, Mark	1.93 m (6 ft 4 in)	28 – 15 February 1997
PG	10	(Spain)	Martínez, Jorge	1.87 m (6 ft 2 in)	28 – 26 September 1996
PF	33	(United States)	McDonald, Billy	1.98 m (6 ft 6 in)	30 – 29 June 1994
PG	5	(Spain)	Pérez, Álvaro	1.90 m (6 ft 3 in)	33 – 13 August 1991
C	19	(Serbia)	Radojičić, Petar	2.06 m (6 ft 9 in)	30 – 17 May 1994
PG	4	(Spain)	Sanz, Álvaro	1.90 m (6 ft 3 in)	26 – 29 September 1998
SG	14	(Spain)	Tamayo, Álex	1.94 m (6 ft 4 in)	25 – 12 March 2000

Head coach

- (Spain) Antonio Moya

Legend

- (C) Team captain
- Injured
