= 2016–17 LEB Plata season =

LEB Plata
- Season: 2016–17
- Teams: 16

Regular season
- Promoted: Sammic ISB; Comercial Ulsa Ciudad de Valladolid
- Relegated: Arcos Albacete Basket; Torrons Vicens L'Hospitalet; CB Tarragona; Hispagan UPB Gandia

Finals
- Champions: Sammic ISB

The 2016–17 LEB Plata season was the 17th season of the Spanish basketball third league LEB Plata. Sammic ISB won the league.

== Teams ==
=== Promotion and relegation (pre-season) ===
Teams relegated from the 2015–16 LEB Oro

- ~~Actel Força Lleida~~ (remained in LEB Oro)
- Basket Navarra

Teams promoted from the 2015–16 Liga EBA

- Arcos Albacete Basket
- Hispagan UPB Gandia
- Seguros Soliss Alcázar Basket
- Torrons Vicens CB L'Hospitalet

Teams promoted after the expansion

- Comercial Ulsa CBC Valladolid (was relegated last season)
- Agustinos Leclerc
- Aquimisa Laboratorios Queso Zamorano

=== Venues and locations ===
Location of teams in 2016–17 LEB Plata season

Team	City	Arena
Aceitunas Fragata Morón	Morón de la Frontera	Alameda
Agustinos Leclerc	León	Palacio de los Deportes
Aquimisa Laboratorios Queso Zamorano	Zamora	Ángel Nieto
Arcos Albacete Basket	Albacete	Pabellón del Parque
Basket Navarra	Pamplona	Pabellón Universitario de Navarra
Cambados Cidade Europea do Viño 2017	Cambados	O Pombal
Carrefour "El Bulevar" de Ávila	Ávila	Carlos Sastre
CB Tarragona	Tarragona	El Serrallo
Comercial Ulsa CBC Valladolid	Valladolid	Pisuerga
Covirán Granada	Granada	Palacio de Deportes
Hispagan UPB Gandia	Gandia	Municipal
HLA Lucentum	Alicante	Pedro Ferrándiz
Sammic ISB	Azpeitia	Municipal
Seguros Soliss Alcázar Basket	Alcázar de San Juan	Antonio Díaz Miguel
Torrons Vicens CB L'Hospitalet	L'Hospitalet de Llobregat	Nou Pavelló del Centre
Zornotza ST	Amorebieta-Etxano	Larrea

== Regular season ==
=== League table ===
Pos	Team	Pld	W	L	PF	PA	PD	Pts	Promotion, qualification or relegation
1	Sammic ISB (C, P)	30	23	7	2222	2042	+180	53	Promotion to LEB Oro
2	Cambados Cidade Europea do Viño 2017	30	21	9	2513	2260	+253	51	Qualification to playoffs
3	Covirán Granada (X)	30	20	10	2361	2177	+184	50	Qualification to playoffs
4	HLA Lucentum	30	20	10	2308	2121	+187	50	Qualification to playoffs
5	Carrefour "El Bulevar" de Ávila	30	17	13	2107	2085	+22	47	Qualification to playoffs
6	Zornotza ST	30	17	13	2223	2269	−46	47	Qualification to playoffs
7	Comercial Ulsa CBC Valladolid	30	17	13	2137	2099	+38	47	Qualification to playoffs
8	Aceitunas Fragata Morón	30	16	14	2237	2198	+39	46	Qualification to playoffs
9	Kia Sakimóvil Basket Navarra	30	15	15	2138	2187	−49	45	Qualification to playoffs
10	Seguros Soliss Alcázar Basket	30	14	16	2200	2164	+36	44	
11	Agustinos Leclerc	30	13	17	2229	2301	−72	43	
12	Aquimisa Laboratorios Queso Zamorano	30	11	19	2204	2422	−218	41	
13	Torrons Vicens CB L'Hospitalet (R)	30	10	20	2103	2312	−209	40	Relegation to Liga EBA
14	CB Tarragona (R)	30	9	21	2265	2382	−117	39	Relegation to Liga EBA
15	Arcos Albacete Basket (R)	30	9	21	2172	2343	−171	39	Relegation to Liga EBA
16	Hispagan UPB Gandia (R)	30	8	22	2244	2401	−157	38	Relegation to Liga EBA

Source: LEB Plata
(C) Champions; (P) Promoted; (R) Relegated; (X) Copa LEB Plata champion

== Play-offs ==
Seeded teams played at home games 1, 2 and 5. Covirán Granada, as Copa LEB Plata champion, played all series as seeded team.

Quarter-finals
C Covirán Granada	97	95	73
9 Kia Sakimóvil Navarra	59	62	67
5 El Bulevar Ávila	54	64	61	69
6 Zornotza ST	53	66	76	74
2 Cidade Europea do Viño	78	74	71	70
8 Aceitunas Fragata Morón	70	82	75	75
4 HLA Lucentum	76	53	53	65	66
7 Comercial Ulsa Valladolid	71	56	54	63	68

Semi-finals
C Covirán Granada	79	81	80	65	81
6 Zornotza ST	68	84	81	54	92
8 Aceitunas Fragata Morón	66	73	76	78	74
7 Comercial Ulsa Valladolid	63	76	66	86	95

Final
6 Zornotza ST	68	77	54	66
7 Comercial Ulsa Valladolid	73	66	61	71

== Copa LEB Plata ==
21 January 2017
19:00

Report

Covirán Granada	80–74	HLA Lucentum
Scoring by quarter: 19–27, 20–15, 21–15, 20–17
Pts: Fernández 19; Rebs: Freitas 11; Asts: four players 2 PIR: Fernández 20		Pts: Rejón 16; Rebs: Méndez 11; Asts: Lobo 5 PIR: Rejón 23

Palacio de Deportes, Granada
Attendance: 6,118
Referees: Juan Gabriel Carpallo (ESP), Alejandro López Lecuona (ESP)
