= Northern Arizona Lumberjacks men's basketball statistical leaders =

The Northern Arizona Lumberjacks men's basketball statistical leaders are individual statistical leaders of the Northern Arizona Lumberjacks men's basketball program in various categories, including points, assists, blocks, rebounds, and steals. Within those areas, the lists identify single-game, single-season, and career leaders. The Lumberjacks represent Northern Arizona University in the NCAA's Big Sky Conference.

Northern Arizona began competing in intercollegiate basketball in 1909. However, the school's record book does not generally list records from before the 1950s, as records from before this period are often incomplete and inconsistent. Since scoring was much lower in this era, and teams played much fewer games during a typical season, it is likely that few or no players from this era would appear on these lists anyway.

The NCAA did not officially record assists as a stat until the 1983–84 season, and blocks and steals until the 1985–86 season, but Northern Arizona's record books includes players in these stats before these seasons. These lists are updated through the end of the 2024–25 season.

== Scoring ==
Career
Rk	Player	Points	Seasons
1	Cameron Jones	1,643	2007–08 2008–09 2009–10 2010–11
2	Kelly Golob	1,550	2002–03 2003–04 2004–05 2005–06
3	Andy Hurd	1,533	1982–83 1983–84 1984–85 1985–86
4	Ross Land	1,525	1996–97 1997–98 1998–99 1999–00
5	Trent McLaughlin	1,474	2022–23 2023–24 2024–25
6	Gabe Rogers	1,422	2009–10 2010–11 2011–12 2012–13
7	Ruben Boykin Jr.	1,378	2003–04 2004–05 2005–06 2006–07
8	Dan McClintock	1,363	1996–97 1997–98 1998–99 1999–00
9	Willie Nash	1,351	1962–63 1963–64 1964–65 1965–66
10	James Plump	1,349	1966–67 1967–68 1968–69

Season
Rk	Player	Points	Season
1	Trent McLaughlin	752	2024–25
2	Cameron Jones	640	2010–11
3	Jalen Cone	602	2021–22
4	Jalen Cone	580	2022–23
5	Gabe Rogers	573	2012–13
6	Kyle Landry	561	2007–08
7	Andre Spencer	550	1985–86
8	Quinton Upshur	549	2014–15
	Trent McLaughlin	549	2023–24
10	Cameron Jones	541	2009–10

Single game
Rk	Player	Points	Season	Opponent
1	Frank Turley	46	1955–56	Western New Mexico
2	Jalen Cone	45	2022–23	Southern Utah
3	Cory Schwab	43	2000–01	Cal Poly
4	Mike Williams	40	1969–70	Eastern Washington
	Jason Word	40	1993–94	Southern Utah
6	Bill Lewis	39	1955–56	Arizona State
7	Jalen Cone	38	2022–23	Abilene Christian
8	Bill Aaron	37	1959–60	Rockhurst
	Aaron Bond	37	2002–03	Tennessee Martin
	Cameron Jones	37	2010–11	Idaho State

== Rebounds ==
Career
Rk	Player	Rebounds	Seasons
1	Carson Towt	1,078	2020–21 2021–22 2022–23 2024–25
2	Don Buttrum	1,044	1958–59 1959–60 1960–61 1961–62
3	Ryan McDade	842	1999–00 2000–01 2001–02 2002–03
4	Bill Aaron	812	1956–57 1957–58 1958–59 1959–60
5	Ruben Boykin Jr.	800	2003–04 2004–05 2005–06 2006–07
6	Jordyn Martin	796	2012–13 2013–14 2014–15 2015–16 2016–17
7	Brooks DeBisschop	706	2016–17 2017–18 2018–19 2019–20
8	Gaellan Bewernick	704	2011–12 2012–13 2013–14 2014–15
9	Kyle Landry	683	2004–05 2005–06 2006–07 2007–08
10	David Duane	625	1983–84 1984–85 1985–86 1986–87

Season
Rk	Player	Rebounds	Season
1	Carson Towt	423	2024–25
2	Don Buttrum	376	1961–62
3	Bill Aaron	298	1957–58
4	Bill Aaron	297	1959–60
	Don Buttrum	297	1960–61
6	Jordyn Martin	284	2016–17
7	Carson Towt	280	2021–22
8	Carson Towt	274	2022–23
9	Jordyn Martin	277	2014–15
10	Floyd Mathew	276	1971–72

Single game
Rk	Player	Rebounds	Season	Opponent
1	Carlos Moore	25	1959–60	Grand Canyon
	Don Buttrum	25	1961–62	College of Santa Fe
	Milt Jacobs	25	1965–66	Weber State
4	George Anderson	23	1963–64	Grand Canyon
	Floyd Mathew	23	1971–72	San Diego
	Charles Flemons	23	1971–72	College of Santa Fe
7	George Anderson	22	1964–65	UNLV
	Dick Williams	22	1966–67	Westminister
9	Mike Williams	20	1969–70	Adams State
	Mark Stevens	20	1979–80	U.S. International
	David Duane	20	1984–85	Oregon

== Assists ==
Career
Rk	Player	Assists	Seasons
1	Josh Wilson	636	2005–06 2006–07 2007–08 2008–09
2	Stallon Saldivar	505	2009–10 2010–11 2011–12 2012–13
3	Harry Payne	435	1983–84 1984–85 1985–86 1986–87
4	Jeff Altman	427	1981–82 1982–83 1983–84 1984–85
5	Kris Yanku	419	2013–14 2014–15 2015–16
6	Kyle Feuerbach	411	2001–02 2002–03 2003–04 2004–05
7	Carson Towt	368	2020–21 2021–22 2022–23 2024–25
8	Adam Lopez	334	1999–00 2000–01 2001–02
9	Steve Williams	333	1988–89 1989–90 1990–91 1991–92
10	Tom DeBerry	320	1974–75 1975–76

Season
Rk	Player	Assists	Season
1	Josh Wilson	195	2005–06
2	Harry Payne	194	1985–86
3	Kris Yanku	189	2014–15
4	Josh Wilson	181	2006–07
5	Josh Wilson	173	2007–08
	Stallon Saldivar	173	2010–11
7	Tom DeBerry	169	1974–75
8	Kevin Tucker	158	1987–88
9	Harry Payne	153	1986–87
10	Tom DeBerry	151	1975–76

Single game
Rk	Player	Assists	Season	Opponent
1	Tom DeBerry	16	1975–76	Portland State
2	Adam Lopez	15	2000–01	Colgate
3	Greg Henderson	14	1977–78	Grand Canyon
	Harry Payne	14	1986–87	Concordia
	Josh Wilson	14	2006–07	Eastern Washington
6	Kawika Akina	13	1998–99	St. Bonaventure
	Adam Lopez	13	2000–01	Cal Poly
	Kyle Feuerbach	13	2004–05	Sacramento State
	Josh Wilson	13	2005–06	Portland State
	Stallon Saldivar	13	2010–11	Idaho State

== Steals ==
Career
Rk	Player	Steals	Seasons
1	Tom DeBerry	247	1974–75 1975–76
2	Nate Payne	200	1972–73 1973–74 1974–75
3	Jeff Altman	169	1981–82 1982–83 1983–84 1984–85
4	Kris Yanku	141	2013–14 2014–15 2015–16
5	Randy Stratton	133	1974–75 1975–76
6	Trent McLaughlin	128	2022–23 2023–24 2024–25
7	John Rondeno	124	1992–93 1993–94 1994–95
8	Charles Thomas	120	1995–96 1996–97
9	Josh Wilson	118	2005–06 2006–07 2007–08 2008–09
10	Michael McNair	113	1995–96 1996–97 1997–98 1998–99
	Cameron Shelton	113	2018–19 2019–20 2020–21

Season
Rk	Player	Steals	Season
1	Tom DeBerry	247	1974–75
2	Tom DeBerry	100	1975–76
3	Nate Payne	78	1974–75
4	Charles Thomas	72	1995–96
5	Emerson Gordon	67	1973–74
	Nate Payne	67	1973–74
7	Trent McLaughlin	58	2024–25
8	Elliott Jones	56	1980–81
	Kevin Tucker	56	1987–88
10	Nate Payne	55	1972–73

Single game
Rk	Player	Steals	Season	Opponent
1	Tom DeBerry	12	1974–75	Portland State
2	Tom DeBerry	8	1975–76	Whittier
	Jeff Spencer	8	1976–77	Washington
4	Tom DeBerry	7	1974–75	Idaho
	Mark Stevens	7	1979–80	UC Irvine
	Kawika Akina	7	1997–98	Cincinnati
	Ryan McDade	7	2002–03	Sacramento State
	DeWayne Russell	7	2012–13	Eastern Washington
9	Tom DeBerry	6	1975–76	Doane
	Tom DeBerry	6	1975–76	Boise State
	Ray Tsingine	6	1976–77	Mesa State
	Guy King	6	1976–77	Grand Canyon
	Ted Plotts	6	1981–82	San Diego
	Mark Anderson	6	1987–88	Boise State
	Steve Lizzul	6	1988–89	Weber State
	Jermone Riley	6	1994–95	Utah
	Charles Thomas	6	1995–96	Montana Tech
	Casey Frank	6	1997–98	Weber State

== Blocks ==
Career
Rk	Player	Blocks	Seasons
1	Dan McClintock	196	1996–97 1997–98 1998–99 1999–00
2	Shane Johannsen	138	2007–08 2008–09 2009–10 2010–11
3	Len Springs	130	2013–14 2014–15
4	Dan Busch	97	1979–80 1980–81 1981–82 1982–83
5	Shawn Herman	83	1985–86 1987–88 1988–89 1989–90
6	Casey Frank	76	1995–96 1996–97 1997–98 1998–99
7	Ryan McCurdy	75	2004–05 2005–06 2006–07 2007–08
	Brooks DeBisschop	75	2016–17 2017–18 2018–19 2019–20
9	Antwine Murchison	73	1984–85 1985–86
10	Isaiah Thomas	71	2015–16 2016–17 2017–18 2018–19

Season
Rk	Player	Blocks	Season
1	Shane Johannsen	75	2010–11
2	Len Springs	72	2014–15
3	Dan McClintock	70	1999–00
4	Dan Busch	58	1982–83
	Len Springs	58	2013–14
6	Carson Basham	53	2023–24
7	Adrian Hayes	47	2003–04
8	Dan McClintock	43	1996–97
9	Dan McClintock	42	1998–99
	Joakim Kjellbom	42	2003–04

Single game
Rk	Player	Blocks	Season	Opponent
1	Dan Busch	6	1982–83	College of Santa Fe
	Dan McClintock	6	1998–99	Weber State
	Dan McClintock	6	1999–00	Eastern Washington
	Adrian Hayes	6	2003–04	San Jose Christian
	Joakim Kjellbom	6	2003–04	Idaho State
	Adrian Hayes	6	2003–04	Eastern Washington
	Len Springs	6	2013–14	Eastern Washington
	Len Springs	6	2014–15	Portland State
	Carson Basham	6	2023–24	Portland State
	Carson Basham	6	2023–24	Eastern Washington
