= Chas McFarland =

American basketball player (born 1986)

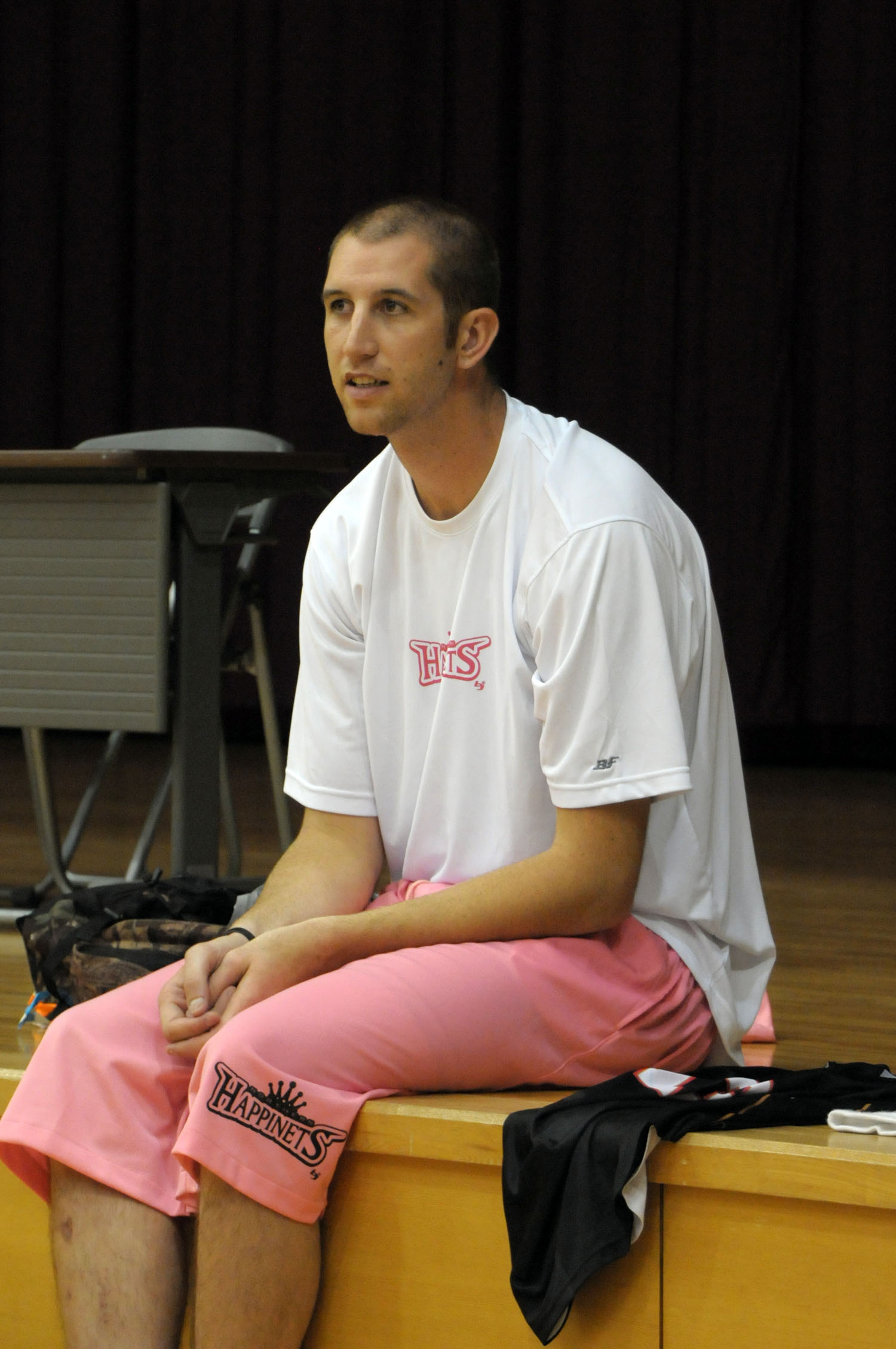
- McFarland at Kotooka General Gymnasium

Personal information
- Born: November 1, 1986 (age 39) Bay City, Texas, U.S.
- Listed height: 7 ft 0 in (2.13 m)
- Listed weight: 245 lb (111 kg)

Career information
- High school: Lovington (Lovington, Illinois); Worcester Academy (Worcester, Massachusetts)
- College: Wake Forest (2006–2010)
- NBA draft: 2010: undrafted
- Playing career: 2010–2015
- Position: Center
- Number: 13

Career history
- 2010–2011: Springfield Armor
- 2011–2012: Yokohama B-Corsairs
- 2012: Club Atlético Bohemios
- 2012: Springfield Armor
- 2013: Texas Legends
- 2013–2014: Akita Northern Happinets
- 2014–2015: Club Atlético Olimpia

Chas William McFarland (born November 1, 1986) is an American former professional basketball player for the Akita Northern Happinets of the Japanese bj league. The 7-footer was the tallest Happinets player and took over the "air supremacy". He was kicked in head by Niigata forward Rodney Webb and broke his nose in March 2014.

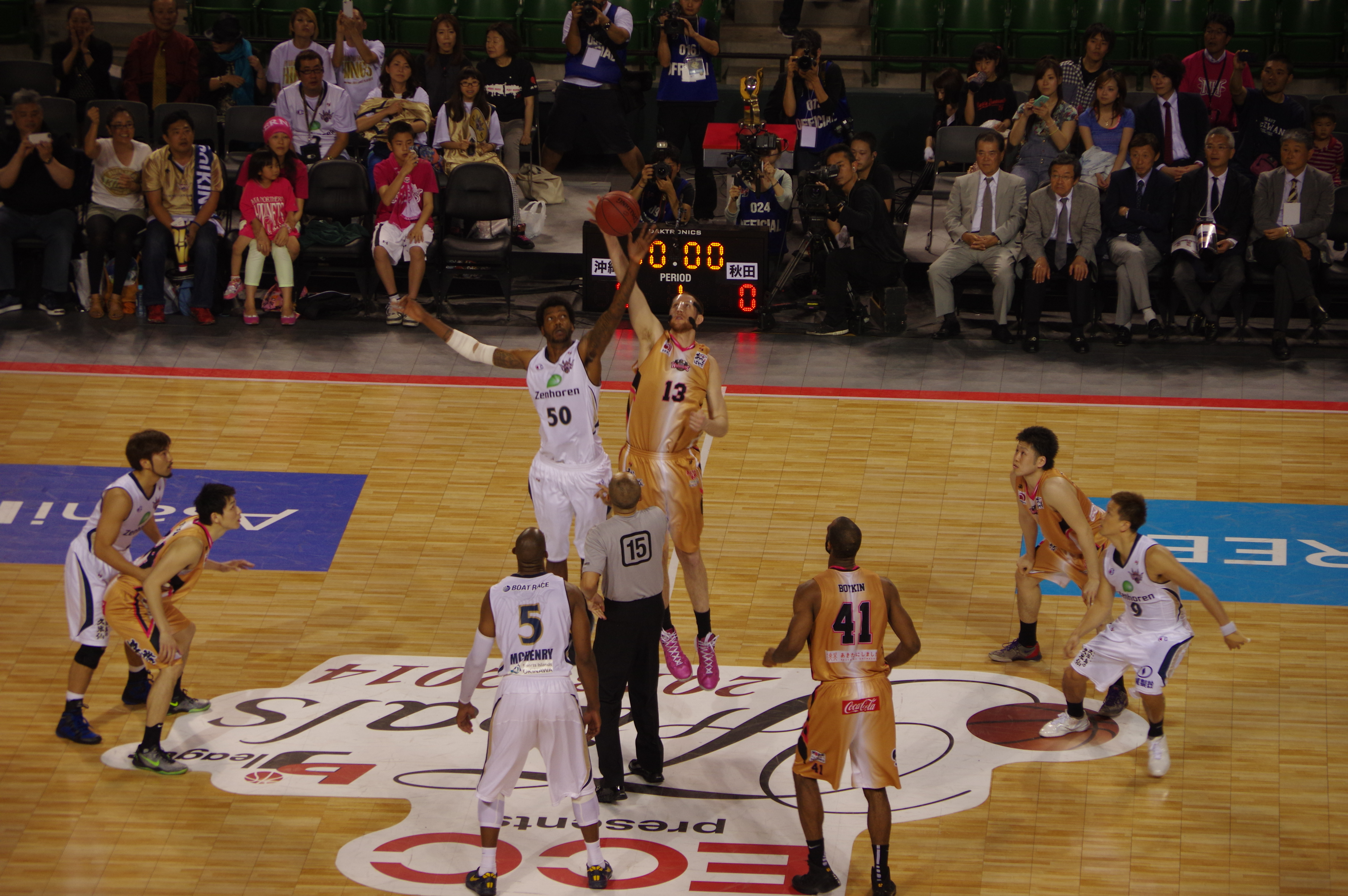
McFarland #13 battles for the jumpball during the bj league final at Ariake Coliseum

== College statistics ==
Year	Team	GP	GS	MPG	FG%	3P%	FT%	RPG	APG	SPG	BPG	PPG
2006–07	Wake Forest	15	0	5.4	.286	1.000	.333	1.6	0.5	0.1	0.1	0.7
2007–08	Wake Forest	30	27	21.5	.490	.182	.659	5.8	0.4	0.5	1.6	8.4
2008–09	Wake Forest	31	29	20.4	.522	.000	.722	5.8	0.5	0.6	0.9	8.7
2009–10	Wake Forest	31	25	24.6	.446	.000	.600	7.0	0.8	0.5	1.2	7.2
Career		107	81	19.8	.482	.158	.653	5.6	0.6	0.4	1.1	7.1

=== Playoffs ===
Year	Team	GP	GS	MPG	FG%	3P%	FT%	RPG	APG	SPG	BPG	PPG
2009–10	Wake Forest	2		20.5	.444	.000	.600	5.0	1.5	0.0	0.5	5.5

=== NCAA Special Events Stats ===
Year	Team	GP	GS	MPG	FG%	3P%	FT%	RPG	APG	SPG	BPG	PPG
2010	Portsmouth Invitational Tournament	3		20.00	.533	.000	.000	6	1.3	0.3	1.3	5.3

== Career statistics ==
Legend
GP	Games played	GS	Games started	MPG	Minutes per game
FG%	Field goal percentage	3P%	3-point field goal percentage	FT%	Free throw percentage
RPG	Rebounds per game	APG	Assists per game	SPG	Steals per game
BPG	Blocks per game	PPG	Points per game	**Bold**	Career high

=== NBA Stats ===
Year	Team	GP	GS	MPG	FG%	3P%	FT%	RPG	APG	SPG	BPG	PPG
2010–11	HOU	2	0	2.8	.333	.000	.000	0.50	0.00	0.00	0.00	1.00

=== Regular season ===
Year	Team	GP	GS	MPG	FG%	3P%	FT%	RPG	APG	SPG	BPG	PPG
2010–11	SPG	26	21	22.5	.525	.000	.747	5.77	1.08	0.46	1.00	10.5
2011–12	Yokohama	49	39	23.2	.491	.000	.692	8.7	1.1	0.8	1.3	9.9
2012–13	SPG/TEX	19	4	10.5	.417	.000	.625	2.79	0.42	0.42	0.21	3.42
2013–14	Akita	47		23.7	.532	.000	.675	8.0	2.5	0.8	1.3	11.9

=== G League Awards & Honors ===
- All-Rookie 2nd Team - 2011

=== Playoffs ===
Year	Team	GP	GS	MPG	FG%	3P%	FT%	RPG	APG	SPG	BPG	PPG
2011-12	Yokohama	4		18.3	.524	.000	.722	7.3	0.8	0.0	0.8	8.8
2013-14	Akita	6	6	20.83	.690	.000	.826	6.17	1.83	1.67	0.83	12.83

== Trivia ==
Chas Burger is sold at the shop named Nakadori Satisfaction in Akita.
