= 1998 Big Sky Conference men's basketball tournament =

Basketball tournament

- Classification: Division I
- Season: 1997–98
- Teams: 6
- Site: Walkup Skydome; Flagstaff, AZ
- Champions: Northern Arizona (1st title)
- Winning coach: Ben Howland (1st title)
- MVP: Dan McClintock (Northern Arizona)

1997–98 Big Sky men's basketball standings
| | Conf. | | | | Overall |
| Team | W | | L | PCT | W | | L | PCT |
|---|---|---|---|---|---|---|---|---|
| Northern Arizona † | 13 | – | 3 | .813 | 21 | – | 8 | .724 |
| Weber State | 12 | – | 4 | .750 | 14 | – | 13 | .519 |
| Portland State | 10 | – | 6 | .625 | 15 | – | 12 | .556 |
| Eastern Washington | 10 | – | 6 | .625 | 16 | – | 11 | .593 |
| Montana | 9 | – | 7 | .563 | 16 | – | 14 | .533 |
| Montana State | 9 | – | 7 | .563 | 19 | – | 11 | .633 |
| Cal State Northridge | 7 | – | 9 | .438 | 12 | – | 16 | .429 |
| Idaho State | 2 | – | 14 | .125 | 6 | – | 20 | .231 |
| Sacramento State | 0 | – | 16 | .000 | 1 | – | 25 | .038 |
† Conference tournament winner

The 1998 Big Sky Conference men's basketball tournament was held March 5–7 at the Walkup Skydome at Northern Arizona University in Flagstaff, Arizona.

Top-seeded host Northern Arizona easily defeated Montana State in the championship game, 77–50, to win their first Big Sky men's basketball tournament title.

== Format ==
No new teams were added and membership remained at nine. As a transitioning Division I member, Portland State was not eligible for this year's Big Sky tournament.

Similar to the previous year, the top six teams in the regular season conference standings participated in the tournament. The top two earned byes into the semifinals while the remaining four played in the quarterfinals. The lowest remaining seed met the top seed in the semifinals.

== Bracket ==
Quarterfinals; Thursday, March 5
3 | Eastern Washington | 98
6 | Cal State Northridge | 104
4 | Montana State | 68
5 | Montana | 60

Semifinals; Friday, March 6
1 | Northern Arizona | 86
6 | Cal State Northridge | 79
2 | Weber State | 64
4 | Montana State | 69

Championship; Saturday, March 7
1 | Northern Arizona | 77
4 | Montana State | 50

== NCAA tournament ==
Northern Arizona received the automatic bid to the NCAA tournament, their first appearance in the Division I tournament. No other Big Sky members were invited or to the NIT. The Lumberjacks were seeded fifteenth in the West regional and lost by three points to Cincinnati in the first round in Boise.

== See also ==
- Big Sky Conference women's basketball tournament
