= 2015–16 LEB Plata season =

LEB Plata
- Season: 2015–16
- Games played: 184 (Regular season)
- Teams: 14

Regular season
- Season MVP: Javonte Green
- Promoted: Marín Ence Peixegalego; Sáenz Horeca Araberri
- Relegated: Brico Dépôt Ciudad de Valladolid; Viten Getafe

Finals
- Champions: Marín Ence Peixegalego

The 2015–16 LEB Plata season was the 16th season of the Spanish basketball third league LEB Plata. The season started on October 3 and ended on May 13.

== Teams ==
=== Promotion and relegation (pre-season) ===
Despite the aim of the Spanish Basketball Federation to increase the number of teams to 16, only a total of 15 teams.

Despite being relegated to Liga EBA, Sáenz Horeca Araberri achieved a vacant berth like CB Ciudad de Valladolid and Fundación Lucentum Baloncesto, two new-creation teams. Instituto de Fertilidad Clínicas Rincón resigned to its place in LEB Oro and decided to join the league.

Team relegated from the 2014–15 LEB Oro

- ~~CB Prat Joventut~~ (remained in LEB Oro achieving a vacant berth)

Teams promoted from the 2014–15 Liga EBA

- Aceitunas Fragata Morón
- ~~CB Andratx Giwine~~ (resigned to promote)
- ~~CB Deportivo Coín~~ (resigned to promote)
- Covirán Granada

=== Venues and locations ===
Location of teams in 2015–16 LEB Plata season

Team	City	Arena
Aceitunas Fragata Morón	Morón de la Frontera	Alameda
Ametx Zornotza	Amorebieta-Etxano	Larrea
Brico Dépôt Ciudad de Valladolid	Valladolid	Pisuerga
Carrefour "El Bulevar" de Ávila	Ávila	Carlos Sastre
CB Tarragona	Tarragona	El Serrallo
Covirán Granada	Granada	Palacio de Deportes
Fundación Lucentum	Alicante	Pedro Ferrándiz
Instituto de Fertilidad Clínicas Rincón	Torremolinos	San Miguel
Marín Ence Peixegalego	Marín	A Raña
Sáenz Horeca Araberri	Vitoria-Gasteiz	Mendizorroza
Sammic ISB	Azpeitia	Municipal
Simply Olivar	Zaragoza	Miralbueno El Olivar
Viten Getafe	Getafe	Juan de la Cierva
Xuven Cambados	Cambados	O Pombal

== Regular season ==
=== League table ===
Pos	Team	Pld	W	L	PF	PA	PD	Pts	Promotion, qualification or relegation
1	Marín Ence Peixegalego (P, X)	26	20	6	2088	1933	+155	46	Promotion to LEB Oro
2	Sammic ISB	26	19	7	1972	1859	+113	45	Qualification to playoffs
3	Sáenz Horeca Araberri (P)	26	17	9	2130	1933	+197	43	Qualification to playoffs
4	Fundación Lucentum	26	16	10	1880	1789	+91	42	Qualification to playoffs
5	Covirán Granada	26	15	11	2019	1906	+113	41	Qualification to playoffs
6	Carrefour "El Bulevar" de Ávila	26	15	11	1841	1877	−36	41	Qualification to playoffs
7	CB Tarragona	26	14	12	1950	1911	+39	40	Qualification to playoffs
8	Aceitunas Fragata Morón	26	13	13	1885	1862	+23	39	Qualification to playoffs
9	Instituto de Fertilidad Clínicas Rincón	26	11	15	1787	1862	−75	37	Qualification to playoffs
10	Ametx Zornotza	26	10	16	1911	2035	−124	36	
11	Xuven Cambados	26	10	16	2111	2100	+11	36	
12	Simply Olivar	26	9	17	1878	1978	−100	35	
13	Brico Dépôt Ciudad de Valladolid (R)	26	9	17	1912	2097	−185	35	Relegation to Liga EBA
14	Viten Getafe (R)	26	4	22	1755	1977	−222	30	Relegation to Liga EBA

Updated to match(es) played on 9 April 2016. Source: LEB Plata
(P) Promoted; (R) Relegated; (X) Champion of the Copa LEB Plata

== Copa LEB Plata ==
At the half of the league, the two first teams in the table play the Copa LEB Plata at home of the winner of the first half season (13th round). If this team doesn't want to host the Copa Princesa, the second qualified can do it. If nobody wants to host it, the Federation will propose a neutral venue.

The Champion of this Cup will play the play-offs as first qualified if it finishes the league between the 2nd and the 5th qualified. The Copa Princesa will be played on January 29, 2016.

=== The game ===
29 January 2016
19:00

Boxscore

Carrefour "El Bulevar" de Ávila	66–76	Marín Ence Peixegalego
Scoring by quarter: 17–20, 15–25, 15–16, 19–15
Pts: Marzo 17; Rebs: Nikolić 9 Asts: Asanin, Marzo 3 PIR: Ramasauskas 16		Pts: Green 22; Rebs: Pantín 12; Asts: three players 4 PIR: Pantín 34

Multiusos Carlos Sastre, Ávila
Attendance: 1,500
Referees: Quintas Álvarez, Baena Arroyo, González Gálvez

== Playoffs ==
Quarterfinals (13, 16, 19 April)
2	Sammic ISB	77	79	66
9	Instituto de Fertilidad Clínicas Rincón	72	81	69
5	Covirán Granada	70	62	X
6	Carrefour "El Bulevar" de Ávila	78	67	X
3	Sáenz Horeca Araberri	87	63	85
8	Aceitunas Fragata Morón	68	72	49
4	Fundación Lucentum	64	52	X
7	CB Tarragona	75	68	X

Semifinals (22, 24, 29 April, 1, 3 May)
9	Instituto de Fertilidad Clínicas Rincón	64	67	56	77	63
6	Carrefour "El Bulevar" de Ávila	65	63	79	57	66
3	Sáenz Horeca Araberri	77	80	88	68	X
7	CB Tarragona	64	99	68	67	X

Finals (6, 8, 13, 15, 17 May)
6	Carrefour "El Bulevar" de Ávila	45	65	69	X	X
3	Sáenz Horeca Araberri	66	72	83	X	X

== Stats leaders in regular season ==
=== Points ===
Rk	Name	Team	Games	Points	PPG
1	(United States) Gabe Rogers	Marín Ence Peixegalego	21	386	18.4
2	(United States) Javonte Green	Marín Ence Peixegalego	25	451	18.0
3	(United States) Orion Outerbridge	CB Tarragona	24	425	17.7
4	(Spain) Jesús Fernández	Covirán Granada	24	387	16.1
5	(France) Jordan Semple	Sammic ISB	26	407	15.6

=== Rebounds ===
Rk	Name	Team	Games	Rebounds	RPG
1	(Spain) Jesús Fernández	Covirán Granada	24	244	10.2
2	(France) Jordan Semple	Sammic ISB	26	244	9.4
3	(Croatia) Aleksandar Marcius	Sammic ISB	26	239	9.2
4	(Serbia) Luka Nikolic	Carrefour "El Bulevar" de Ávila	23	197	8.6
5	(Democratic Republic of the Congo) Viny Okouo	Instituto de Fertilidad Clínicas Rincón	19	154	8.1

=== Assists ===
Rk	Name	Team	Games	Assists	APG
1	(Spain) Javier Marín	Aceitunas Fragata Morón	24	106	4.4
2	(Spain) Jorge Fernández	Covirán Granada	24	104	4.3
3	(Spain) Carles Marzo	Carrefour "El Bulevar" de Ávila	26	99	3.8
4	(Spain) Carlos Corts	Instituto de Fertilidad Clínicas Rincón	24	85	3.5
5	(Spain) Pablo Pérez	Brico Dépôt Ciudad de Valladolid	25	84	3.4

=== Performance Index Rating ===
Rk	Name	Team	Games	Rating	PIR
1	(United States) Javonte Green	Marín Ence Peixegalego	25	540	21.6
2	(Croatia) Aleksandar Marcius	Sammic ISB	26	525	20.2
3	(France) Jordan Semple	Sammic ISB	26	523	20.1
4	(Spain) Jesús Fernández	Covirán Granada	24	470	19.6
5	(United States) Beau Levesque	Sáenz Horeca Araberri	26	488	18.8

== Awards ==
=== MVP ===
- (United States) Javonte Green (Marín Ence Peixegalego)

=== Coach of the year ===
- (Spain) Javi Llorente (Marín Ence Peixegalego)

=== All-LEB Plata Team ===
- PG (Spain) Carles Marzo (Carrefour "El Bulevar" de Ávila)
- SG (United States) Gabe Rogers (Marín Ence Peixegalego)
- SF (United States) Javonte Green (Marín Ence Peixegalego)
- PF (United States) Beau Levesque (Sáenz Horeca Araberri)
- C (Croatia) Aleksandar Marciuš (Sammic ISB)
