= Ruben Boykin =

American basketball player

Ruben Boykin, Jr.
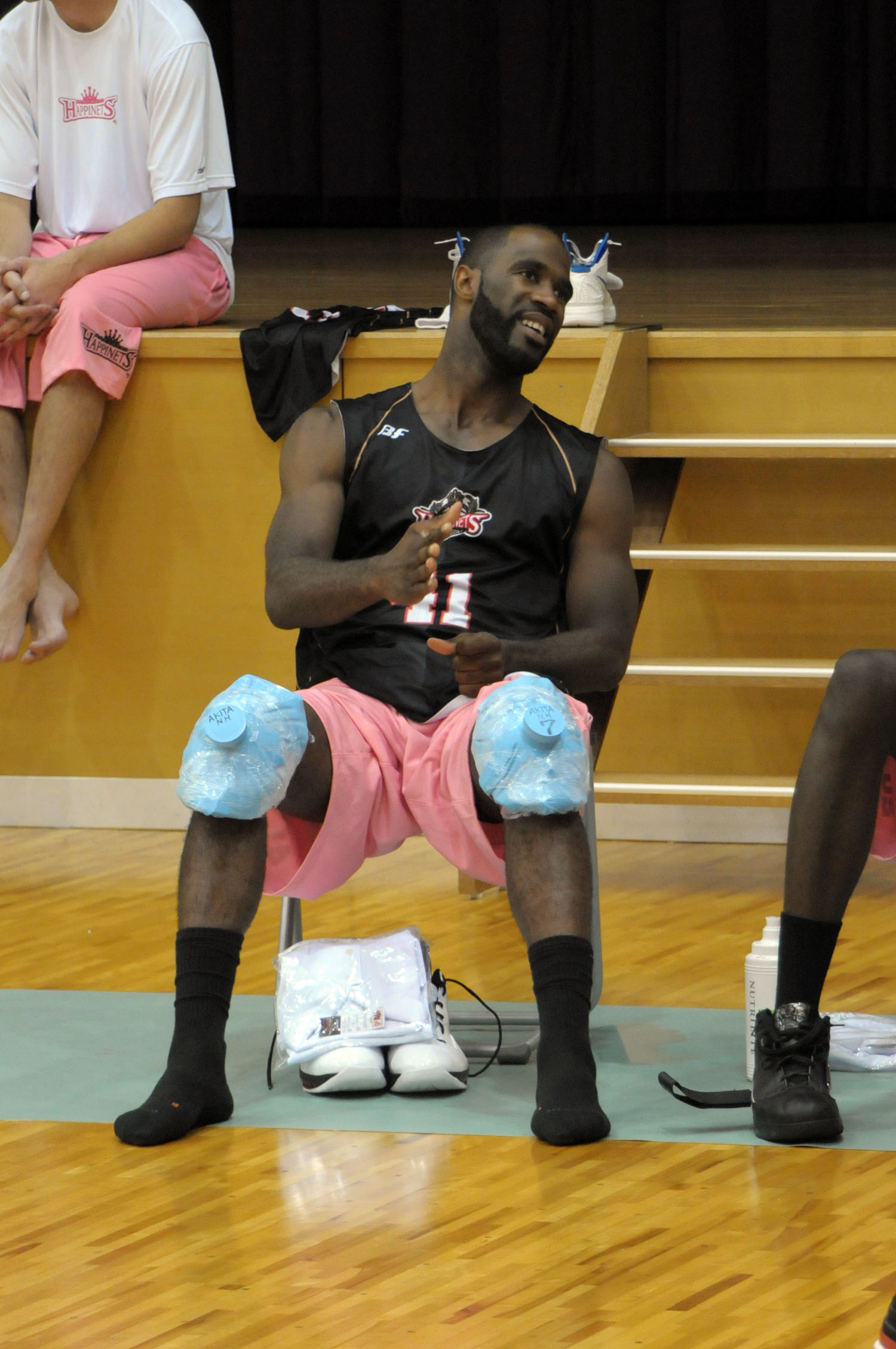
- Boykin at Kotooka General Gymnasium

Osaka Evessa
- Title: Assistant coach
- League: B.League

Personal information
- Born: June 20, 1985 (age 41) Los Angeles, California, U.S.
- Listed height: 201 cm (6 ft 7 in)
- Listed weight: 105 kg (231 lb)

Career information
- High school: University (Los Angeles, California)
- College: Northern Arizona (2003–2007)
- NBA draft: 2007: undrafted
- Playing career: 2007–2018
- Position: Power forward
- Coaching career: 2019–present

Career history

Playing
- 2007–2008: Stal Ostrów Wielkopolski
- 2008–2009: Aurora Basket Jesi
- 2009–2010: Nuova Pallacanestro Pavia
- 2010–2011: Unione Cestistica Casalpusterlengo
- 2011–2012: Kolossos Rodou B.C.
- 2012–2013: KK Włocławek
- 2013–2014: Akita Northern Happinets
- 2014–2015: Riesen Ludwigsburg
- 2015–2016: BG Göttingen
- 2016–2017: Bambitious Nara
- 2017–2018: Earthfriends Tokyo Z
- 2018: Sun Rockers Shibuya

Coaching
- 2019–present: Osaka Evessa (assistant)

Career highlights
- bj league Rebound leader (2014); bj league All-star (2014)

Ruben Eugene Boykin Jr. (born June 20, 1985) is an American former professional basketball player who last played for the Sun Rockers Shibuya of the Japanese B.League.

== Bio ==
Born in 1985 in Los Angeles, California, Ruben lead the team and played varsity basketball for University High School in West Los Angeles and basketball for Northern Arizona University in Flagstaff, Arizona. He graduated with a Bachelor of Science in journalism with a minor in Criminology & Criminal Justice. On June 28, 2007, Ruben went undrafted the 2007 NBA draft making him an Unrestricted Free Agent. Under Pensack Sports Management Group, he played with Atlas Stal Ostrów, Wielkopolski, (Poland) 2007–2008, Aurora Fileni Jesi and Pall. Pavia, Casalpusterlengo (Italy) 2008–2011, VAP Kolossos Rodou (Greece) 2011–2012, BC Anwil, (Poland) 2012–2013, Northern Akita Happinets (Japan) 2013–2015, MHP RIESEN Ludwigsburg, (Germany) 2014, BG Göttingen Violets (Germany) 2015–2016. Ruben then played with Bambitious in Nara, Japan, and Tokyo Z during the 2016–2018 under BG Sports Consultancy, LLC. He last signed to B1 (Division 1) Sunrockers Shibuya, in 2018.

In 2015 he founded Train Like A Pro™ and became an exclusive trainer for high school, college and professional athletes continuing and preparing for their professional careers and those desiring to play professional basketball. He was also a Player Development Coach and Trainer for the Los Angeles Clippers Youth Summer League program and currently referees for high school men and women's basketball in Los Angeles, California, and Houston, Texas. He is an active member of the Texas Association of Sports Officials. Some awards and accomplishments Ruben have fulfilled are over the years are:

- 2007–2008 All-Star Team, Poland
- 2008–2010 2nd Team All-Italian Team
- 2013–2014 Japan All-Star Team, EuroBasket.com Import of the Year, 1st Team All Japan, EuroBasket.com Defensive Player of the Year, Basketball Japan's League Rebound Leader, EuroBasket.com MVP for Japan
- 2013 & 2014 Seasons Basketball Japan's Eastern Conference Champions

== College statistics ==
Year	Team	GP	GS	MPG	FG%	3P%	FT%	RPG	APG	SPG	BPG	PPG
2003–04	Northern Arizona	29	3	17.0	.429	.000	.683	3.62	0.90	0.31	0.17	4.90
2004–05	Northern Arizona	28	27	29.2	.471	.200	.760	7.29	1.79	1.00	0.36	11.36
2005–06	Northern Arizona	32	30	27.7	.592	.222	.793	7.19	1.88	0.69	0.59	13.28
2006–07	Northern Arizona	30	30	31.8	.516	.432	.769	8.93	3.10	0.77	0.53	16.43
Career		119	90	26.5	.512	.343	.767	6.78	1.92	0.69	0.42	11.58

=== NCAA Awards & Honors ===
- All-Big Sky First Team – 2006, 2007
- Big Sky All-Tournament Team – 2007

== Career statistics ==
Legend
GP	Games played	GS	Games started	MPG	Minutes per game
FG%	Field goal percentage	3P%	3-point field goal percentage	FT%	Free throw percentage
RPG	Rebounds per game	APG	Assists per game	SPG	Steals per game
BPG	Blocks per game	PPG	Points per game	**Bold**	Career high

=== Regular season ===
Year	Team	GP	GS	MPG	FG%	3P%	FT%	RPG	APG	SPG	BPG	PPG
2007–08	Ostrów Wielkopolski	23		27.0	.503	.246	.756	6.4	1.4	2.1	0.8	11.9
2008–09	Jesi	30		32.2	.529	.364	.769	7.1	1.3	1.5	0.4	11.7
2009–10	Jesi	15		32.1	.500	.297	.818	7.3	1.4	1.9	1.0	12.7
2009–10	Pavia	15		31.6	.471	.273	.742	10.2	1.3	1.7	0.9	14.9
2010–11	Assigeco	30		30.8	.510	.347	.736	8.1	1.2	1.4	0.7	13.5
2011–12	Rodou	35	34	24.4	.464	.308	.764	4.74	0.74	0.54	0.29	8.80
2012–13	Anwil	44	37	25.8	.439	.312	.696	5.82	1.34	0.61	0.57	7.80
2013–14	Akita	52	52	34	47.8%	35.7%	69.6%	13.5	3.5	1.0	0.3	13.9
2014–15	Akita	52	27	26.5	43.0%	36.8%	75.7%	6.9	4.0	0.6	0.5	10.6
2015–16	BG Göttingen	32	5	12.9	39.9%	31.9%	88.2%	2.31	0.97	0.22	0.25	4.88
2016–17	Nara	60	20	17.0	38.4%	31.4%	75.3%	4.8	1.5	0.4	0.3	6.6
2017–18	Tokyo Z	38	10	24.8	44.2%	36.2%	58.0%	6.1	2.1	0.7	0.3	7.1
2017–18	Shibuya	22	0	9.5	40.0%	38.9%	100.0%	2.1	0.8	0.1	0.1	2.5

=== Playoffs ===
Year	Team	GP	GS	MPG	FG%	3P%	FT%	RPG	APG	SPG	BPG	PPG
2007–08	Ostrów Wielkopolski	7		20.7	.488	.462	.846	4.1	1.7	2.0	0.9	8.1
2008–09	Jesi	5		30.4	.488	.476	.667	7.6	1.2	0.6	0.2	13.6
2011–12	Rodou	11		18.0	.434	.250	.625	2.6	0.9	0.4	0.3	5.5
2012–13	Anwil	10		25.9	.406	.375	1.000	4.7	1.3	1.1	0.2	7.8
2013–14	Akita	6	6	32.00	.492	.464	.783	9.17	2.17	0.67	0.33	15.5

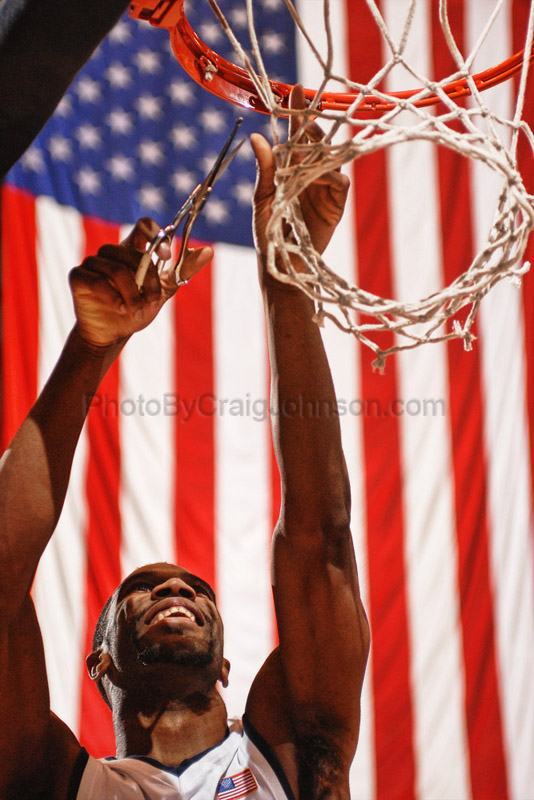
Boykin takes down the nets at the Walkup Skydome to celebrate after 2007 conference win

== Personal ==
Wife: Dr. Keyna (Kirklen Cobb) Boykin (Married July 2013) Children: Canaan E. Boykin (Born 2015); Calvary V. Boykin (Born: 2017) His younger brother Jamal is a professional basketball player. He also has two older sisters, Desi and Serena. Father Ruben Sr and mother Mary
