= Jamal Boykin =

American basketball player (born 1987)

Personal information
- Born: April 27, 1987 (age 39) Los Angeles, California, U.S.
- Listed height: 203 cm (6 ft 8 in)
- Listed weight: 106 kg (234 lb)

Career information
- High school: Fairfax (Los Angeles, California)
- College: Duke (2005–2006); California (2007–2010)
- NBA draft: 2010: undrafted
- Playing career: 2010–2017
- Position: Power forward / center

Career history
- 2010–2011: Gaziantepspor
- 2011–2012: Omonia BC
- 2012: Iwate Big Bulls
- 2012–2013: GasTerra Flames
- 2013: s.Oliver Baskets
- 2013–2014: Cherkaski Mavpy
- 2014: Nelson Giants
- 2014–2015: BG Göttingen
- 2015–2016: Sendai 89ers
- 2016: Shinshu Brave Warriors
- 2016–2017: Basketball Löwen Braunschweig

Career highlights
- NZNBL All-Star Five (2014); Second-team All-Pac-10 (2010); Third-team Parade All-American (2005)

Jamal Thomas Boykin (born April 27, 1987) is an American former professional basketball player. He played college basketball for the Duke Blue Devils and California Golden Bears before playing professionally in Turkey, Cyprus, Japan, Netherlands, Germany, Ukraine and New Zealand.

== High school career ==
Boykin attended Fairfax High School in Los Angeles, where he won numerous awards as a sophomore, junior and senior. As a sophomore in 2002–03, he named state Sophomore Player of the Year after registering 16 points and 10 rebounds per game. As a junior in 2003–04, he earned California High School Sports Junior Player of the Year honors. That season, he shot .766 from the field and averaged 19.5 points and 11.4 rebounds per game while leading Fairfax to the California state championship. He also had 103 assists, 97 blocked shots and 63 steals as a junior.

In November 2004, Boykin signed a National Letter of Intent to play college basketball for Duke University.

As a senior in 2004–05, Boykin was named the Gatorade State Player of the Year in California after averaging 22 points, 12 rebounds, four blocked shots and five assists for Fairfax. He was also named third-team Parade All-American and was the John Wooden Award winner for the city Player of the Year in Los Angeles.

== College career ==
=== Duke (2005–2006) ===
As a freshman at Duke in 2005–06, Boykin saw action in 26 games and averaged 1.0 points and 0.8 rebounds per game. He played eight minutes against Seton Hall in the NIT Season Tip-Off for his collegiate debut, scoring four points and grabbing a pair of offensive rebounds. He later made an appearance against LSU in the Sweet 16 of the NCAA Tournament. He played in three games as a sophomore in 2006–07 before being diagnosed with mono in late November 2006. The following month, he left Duke for medical reasons and informed head coach Mike Krzyzewski that he would not be returning. Boykin realized that he couldn't provide the team with 100 percent on the practice court and also wanted to pursue a bigger role with a different program.

=== California (2007–2010) ===
On December 15, 2006, Boykin committed to the California Golden Bears for the 2007–08 season.

==== Sophomore year ====
Boykin made a dramatic impact on Cal's lineup upon becoming eligible to play on December 22, 2007 against Utah. After scoring two points in six minutes in his debut for the Bears, he came through with 18 points and 10 boards in 19 minutes in his next game against Long Beach State, making 8-of-11 shots from the floor, including both of his three-point attempts. On January 31, 2008, in a game against Washington State, he earned his first of 11 starts in 2007–08. He tied his career high with 18 points in the regular-season finale at UCLA. He later came off the bench in Cal's two NIT games, chipping in 10 points and five rebounds against New Mexico, and seven points against Ohio State. In 25 games as a sophomore, he averaged 7.8 points, 3.8 rebounds and 1.2 assists per game.

==== Junior year ====
As a junior in 2008–09, Boykin started all 33 games and made his presence felt both on the boards, as he was Cal's leading rebounder all season. He led the Bears in rebounds with a total of 211 (6.4 rpg) and 120 in conference games, and was fourth in scoring on the team at 9.6 points per game. His shooting percentage of .529 (129–244) was also the best on the team. He recorded five double-doubles during the season and tallied a career-high 22 points against Stanford.

==== Senior year ====
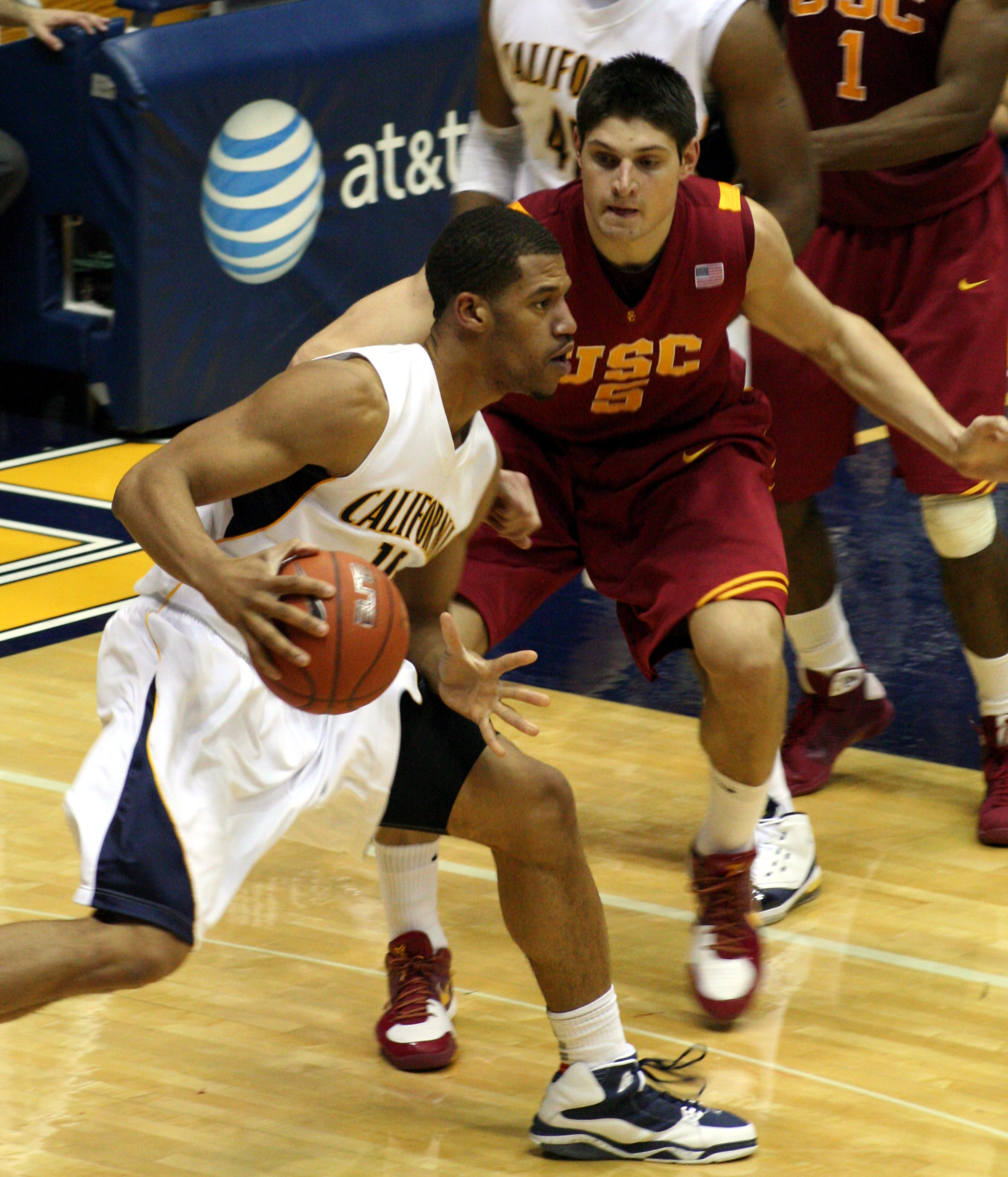
Boykin guarded by Nikola Vučević in a January 2010 game against USC.

As a senior in 2009–10, Boykin earned second-team All-Pac-10 honors after averaging career highs in points (11.9) and rebounds (6.7) per game. He started all 35 games for the Bears and had eight double-doubles on the season, 14 for his career, after posting 13 points and 11 rebounds against Duke in the NCAA Tournament. He set a career high in scoring with 25 points against Arizona State. At the conclusion of the season, his career field-goal percentage of 54.7 ranked fourth all-time in school history.

== Professional career ==
=== 2010–11 season ===
After going undrafted in the 2010 NBA draft, Boykin signed with Turkish team Gaziantepspor in August 2010. In 17 games for Gaziantepspor in 2010–11, he averaged 17.5 points, 7.3 rebounds and 1.0 steals per game.

=== 2011–12 season ===
In September 2011, Boykin signed with Omonia BC of Cyprus for the 2011–12 season. In February 2012, he left Omonia and signed with the Iwate Big Bulls of Japan for the rest of the season. He averaged 13.5 points in eight games for Omonia, and in 24 games for Iwate, he averaged 10.7 points, 6.9 rebounds and 1.2 assists per game.

=== 2012–13 season ===
In July 2012, Boykin signed with Dutch team GasTerra Flames for the 2012–13 season. In 42 games for the Groningen-based team, he averaged 12.7 points, 6.0 rebounds, 1.9 assists and 1.1 steals per game.

=== 2013–14 season ===
On September 7, 2013, Boykin signed with s.Oliver Baskets of Germany for the 2013–14 season. He left the team in November and briefly joined New Yorker Phantoms Braunschweig, but did not play for them. He joined Ukrainian team Cherkaski Mavpy in December 2013 but left in March 2014 due to the Ukrainian revolution.

Boykin joined the Nelson Giants for the 2014 New Zealand NBL season. On May 23, he recorded a season-high 35 points and 11 rebounds in a 91–82 win over the Manawatu Jets. He subsequently earned Player of the Week honors for Round 8. He helped the Giants reach the semi finals and earned New Zealand NBL All-Star Five honors. He appeared in all 19 games for the Giants, averaging 20.3 points, 7.7 rebounds and 1.4 assists per game.

=== 2014–15 season ===
In August 2014, Boykin signed with BG Göttingen of Germany for the 2014–15 season. In 31 games for Göttingen, he averaged 8.1 points and 3.5 rebounds per game.

=== 2015–16 season ===
In August 2015, Boykin signed with the Sendai 89ers of Japan for the 2015–16 season. In 55 games for Sendai, he averaged 17.7 points, 10.3 rebounds, 3.4 assists and 1.0 steals per game.

=== 2016–17 season ===
In July 2016, Boykin signed with the Shinshu Brave Warriors of Japan for the 2016–17 season. In December 2016, he left Shinshu and signed with Basketball Löwen Braunschweig of the German Basketball Bundesliga for the rest of the season. In 23 games for Shinshu, he averaged 11.0 points, 6.1 rebounds and 1.7 assists per game. In 18 games for Braunschweig, he averaged 9.1 points, 3.1 rebounds and 1.0 assists per game.

== Personal ==
Boykin is the son of Ruben Sr. and Mary. His older brother, Ruben Jr., played college basketball at Northern Arizona, where he was a three-time All-Big Sky selection; he then played overseas for 11 seasons. He also has two older sisters, Desi and Serena. His wife, Isri, is a model and a web designer.
