= 1997–98 Northern Arizona Lumberjacks men's basketball team =

American college basketball season

1997–1998 Northern Arizona Lumberjacks men's basketball

Big Sky Regular season champions Big Sky tournament champions

NCAA tournament
- Conference: Big Sky Conference
- Record: 21–8 (13–3 Big Sky)
- Head coach: Ben Howland (4th season)
- Home arena: Walkup Skydome

1997–98 Big Sky men's basketball standings
	Conf.				Overall
Team	W		L	PCT	W		L	PCT
Northern Arizona †	13	–	3	.813	21	–	8	.724
Weber State	12	–	4	.750	14	–	13	.519
Portland State	10	–	6	.625	15	–	12	.556
Eastern Washington	10	–	6	.625	16	–	11	.593
Montana	9	–	7	.563	16	–	14	.533
Montana State	9	–	7	.563	19	–	11	.633
Cal State Northridge	7	–	9	.438	12	–	16	.429
Idaho State	2	–	14	.125	6	–	20	.231
Sacramento State	0	–	16	.000	1	–	25	.038
† Conference tournament winner

The 1997–98 Northern Arizona Lumberjacks men's basketball team represented Northern Arizona University in the 1997-98 NCAA Division I men's basketball season. The Lumberjacks were led by head coach Ben Howland, and played their home games at the Walkup Skydome as members of the Big Sky Conference. After finishing atop the conference regular season standings, Northern Arizona won the Big Sky tournament to receive an automatic bid to the NCAA tournament – the first appearance in school history. As No. 15 seed in the West region, the Lumberjacks lost to No. 2 seed Cincinnati in the opening round, 65–62.

== Roster ==
1997–98 Northern Arizona Lumberjacks men's basketball team
Players	Coaches
Pos. / # / Name / Height / Weight / Year / Previous school / Hometown; C / 50 / Dan McClintock / 7 ft 0 in (2.13 m) / 260 lb (118 kg) / So / Visalia / Visalia, California	Head coach: Ben Howland; Assistant coach(es) Legend: (C) Team captain; (S) Suspended; (I) Ineligible; (W) Walk-on; Injured; Current redshirt; Roster

== Schedule and results ==
Date time, TV	Rank^{#}	Opponent^{#}	Result	Record	Site (attendance) city, state
Non-conference regular season
Nov 15, 1997*		Sonoma State	W 89–67	1–0	Walkup Skydome; Flagstaff, Arizona
Nov 19, 1997*		at Stephen F. Austin	L 70–72	1–1	William R. Johnson Coliseum; Nacogdoches, Texas
Nov 22, 1997*; 6:30 pm		at Texas-Pan American	W 62–57	2–1	UTPA Fieldhouse; Edinburg, Texas
Nov 25, 1997*		San Diego	L 68–73	2–2	Walkup Skydome; Flagstaff, Arizona
Dec 3, 1997*		at Arizona State	L 76–87	2–3	Wells Fargo Arena; Tempe, Arizona
Dec 6, 1997*; 7:05 pm		Texas-Pan American	W 105–56	3–3	Walkup Skydome; Flagstaff, Arizona
Dec 13, 1997*		Western Oregon	W 91–63	4–3	Walkup Skydome; Flagstaff, Arizona
Dec 18, 1997*		at No. 11 UCLA	L 68–90	4–4	Pauley Pavilion; Los Angeles, California
Dec 21, 1997*		UC Irvine	W 88–56	5–4	Walkup Skydome; Flagstaff, Arizona
Dec 30, 1997*		at San Jose State	W 77–64	6–4	Event Center Arena; San Jose, California
Big Sky regular season
Jan 3, 1998		at Eastern Washington	W 83–48	7–4 (1–0)	Reese Court; Cheney, Washington
Jan 5, 1998		at Portland State	L 70–72	7–5 (1–1)	Viking Pavilion; Portland, Oregon
Jan 9, 1998		Montana	W 73–60	8–5 (2–1)	Walkup Skydome; Flagstaff, Arizona
Jan 10, 1998		Montana State	W 76–72	9–5 (3–1)	Walkup Skydome; Flagstaff, Arizona
Jan 14, 1998		at Idaho State	W 87–60	10–5 (4–1)	Holt Arena; Pocatello, Idaho
Jan 16, 1998		at Weber State	L 75–83	10–6 (4–2)	Dee Events Center; Ogden, Utah
Jan 24, 1998		Idaho State	W 87–61	11–6 (5–2)	Walkup Skydome; Flagstaff, Arizona
Jan 31, 1998		Cal State Northridge	W 86–85 ^{OT}	12–6 (6–2)	Walkup Skydome; Flagstaff, Arizona
Feb 5, 1998		at Montana State	W 102–96 ^{OT}	13–6 (7–2)	Worthington Arena; Bozeman, Montana
Feb 7, 1998		at Montana	L 66–73	13–7 (7–3)	Dahlberg Arena; Missoula, Montana
Feb 12, 1998		Portland State	W 87–54	14–7 (8–3)	Walkup Skydome; Flagstaff, Arizona
Feb 14, 1998		Eastern Washington	W 94–79	15–7 (9–3)	Walkup Skydome; Flagstaff, Arizona
Feb 19, 1998		Sacramento State	W 86–49	16–7 (10–3)	Walkup Skydome; Flagstaff, Arizona
Feb 21, 1998		Weber State	W 79–70 ^{OT}	17–7 (11–3)	Walkup Skydome; Flagstaff, Arizona
Feb 25, 1998		at Cal State Northridge	W 64–61	18–7 (12–3)	The Matadome; Northridge, California
Feb 27, 1998		at Sacramento State	W 92–52	19–7 (13–3)	Hornets Nest; Sacramento, California
Big Sky tournament
Mar 6, 1998*	(1)	(6) Cal State Northridge; Semifinals	W 86–79	20–7	Walkup Skydome; Flagstaff, Arizona
Mar 7, 1998*	(1)	(4) Montana State; Championship game	W 77–50	21–7	Walkup Skydome; Flagstaff, Arizona
NCAA tournament
Mar 12, 1998*	(15 W)	vs. (2 W) No. 9 Cincinnati; First round	L 62–65	21–8	BSU Pavilion; Boise, Idaho
*Non-conference game. ^{#}Rankings from AP Poll. (#) Tournament seedings in parentheses. All times are in Mountain.
