= Javonte Green =

American-Montenegrin basketball player (1993)

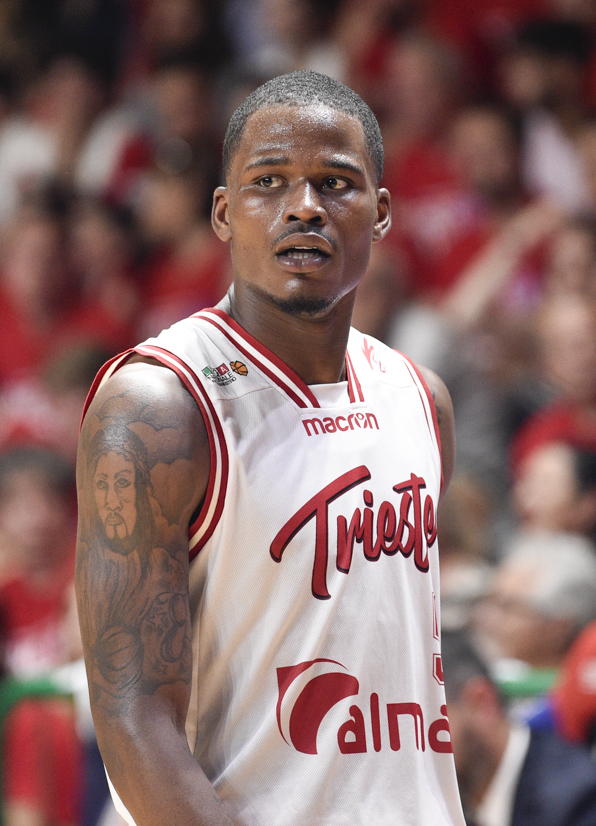
- Green with Trieste in 2018

No. 31 – Detroit Pistons
- Position: Shooting guard
- League: NBA

Personal information
- Born: July 23, 1993 (age 33) Petersburg, Virginia, U.S.
- Listed height: 6 ft 5 in (1.96 m)
- Listed weight: 205 lb (93 kg)

Career information
- High school: Brunswick (Lawrenceville, Virginia)
- College: Radford (2011–2015)
- NBA draft: 2015: undrafted
- Playing career: 2015–present

Career history
- 2015–2016: Peixegalego
- 2016–2018: Trieste
- 2018–2019: ratiopharm Ulm
- 2019–2021: Boston Celtics
- 2021–2023: Chicago Bulls
- 2023–2024: Santa Cruz Warriors
- 2024: Chicago Bulls
- 2024–2025: New Orleans Pelicans
- 2025: Cleveland Cavaliers
- 2025–present: Detroit Pistons

Career highlights
- BBL All-Star (2019); LEB Plata champion (2016); LEB Plata MVP (2016); All-LEB Plata (2016); Big South Defensive Player of the Year (2015); 2× First-team All-Big South (2014, 2015); Second-team All-Big South (2013); No. 2 retired by Radford Highlanders
- Stats at NBA.com
- Stats at Basketball Reference

Javonte Green (born July 23, 1993) is an American-Montenegrin professional basketball player for the Detroit Pistons of the National Basketball Association (NBA). He played college basketball for the Radford Highlanders.

After going undrafted in the 2015 NBA draft, Green played five years overseas before making his NBA debut in 2019 with the Boston Celtics with whom he played for one-and-a-half seasons before getting traded to the Chicago Bulls in 2021. After nearly three seasons with the Bulls, Green played in the NBA G League for the Santa Cruz Warriors before returning to Chicago late in the 2023–24 season. The next season, Green played for the New Orleans Pelicans and the Cleveland Cavaliers.

== Early life ==
Green was born and grew up in Petersburg, Virginia, until he was 12 years old, when he moved in to live with his aunt in Alberta, Virginia. He attended Brunswick High School in nearby Lawrenceville, where he played basketball for former Virginia and NBA shooting guard Bryant Stith. As a senior, Green averaged 18.6 points, 5.8 rebounds, 2.3 assists and 3.1 steals per game and led the Bulldogs to the VHSL Group AA Division 3 state title. He was named first team All-State and the Virginia Co-Player of the Year. He committed to play college basketball at Radford University, the only NCAA Division I school to offer him a scholarship. Green also played football at Brunswick and was the team's starting quarterback during his junior and senior years. Green was offered a scholarship to James Madison University to play football.

== College career ==
Green played for four seasons as a member of the Radford Highlanders. Green entered the starting lineup as a freshman, averaging 10.2 points, 6.7 rebounds and 1.4 steals per game and was named to the Big South Conference's All-Newcomer team. As a sophomore, his first full season as a starter, Green led the Highlanders with 14.6 points and 8.1 rebounds per game and was named Second Team All-Big South. He was named First Team All-Big South in his junior season after averaging 16.9 points, 8.1 rebounds and 1.9 steals per game, while also setting the school single season record for steals with 68. As a senior, Green averaged 15.4 points, nine rebounds, and 1.9 steals and was again named First Team All-Big South as well as the conference Defensive Player of the Year. Green finished his collegiate career as Radford's career leader in rebounds (1,064), steals (245), and games played (133) and second all-time in scoring with 1,911 points. On November 28, 2021, his number 2 jersey was retired by the school.

== Professional career ==
=== Marín Peixegalego (2015–2016) ===
After going undrafted in the 2015 NBA draft, Green signed with Marín Peixegalego of the Spanish third division, LEB Plata on September 11, 2015. In his first professional season, Green averaged 18 points, 6.7 rebounds, and 2.2 steals per game and was named the LEB Plata's Most Valuable Player.

=== Pallacanestro Trieste (2016–2018) ===
Green signed with Pallacanestro Trieste of the Italian second division, Serie A2 Basket, on July 11, 2016. He averaged 15.6 points, 5.5 rebounds, and 2.4 steals in 45 games with Trieste during the 2016–17 season. He returned to Trieste for a second season, averaging 18.1 points, 7.1 rebounds, 1.4 assists and a league-leading 2.3 steals per game. Following the season, Green was named to the Phoenix Suns NBA Summer League roster.

=== ratiopharm Ulm (2018–2019) ===
Green signed with ratiopharm Ulm of the Basketball Bundesliga on July 25, 2018. Green averaged 13.8 points, 4.7 rebounds, 1.6 assists, and 2.3 steals per game in 51 games between league and EuroCup play. He was selected as a reserve to play in the 2019 BBL All-Star Game as a member of the "International" team.

=== Boston Celtics (2019–2021) ===
Green was invited to play in the 2019 NBA Summer League as a member of the Boston Celtics roster. He played in all five of the Celtics' games and averaged 10.8 points, 4.8 rebounds, 2.8 assists, and 1.8 steals. On July 25, 2019, the Celtics signed Green to a two-year contract with a partially guaranteed salary for the first season. After averaging 9.3 points (on 80% shooting) and 4.0 rebounds in 14.1 minutes played per game in the preseason, Green was named to the Celtics final roster going into the 2019–20 season. Green made his NBA debut on October 25, 2019, against the Toronto Raptors, playing the last five seconds of the first half as a defensive replacement in a 112–106 win. The appearance made him the first former Radford player to play in an NBA game. Green scored his first career points on November 7, 2019, against the Charlotte Hornets, finishing the game with 12 points on 5-of-9 shooting in a 108–87 win. Green made his first NBA start on February 3, 2020, against the Atlanta Hawks, grabbing three rebounds with one assist and no points in 18 minutes played. On August 25, 2020, Green underwent successful arthroscopic procedure in repairing a small meniscal tear in his right knee and missed the postseason. His son was born the next day, August 26, 2020.

=== Chicago Bulls (2021–2023) ===
On March 25, 2021, Green was traded to the Chicago Bulls in a three-team trade involving the Washington Wizards. On August 19, 2021, the Bulls announced that they had re-signed Green. Green underwent an arthroscopic debridement to remedy a bone bruise in his right knee on January 11, 2023. He returned to the Bulls for limited minutes starting March 20, but only played in four remaining games. During this first stint with the Bulls, Green became a fan favourite, known for his athleticism and good defence. His popularity amongst fans also led Green to being a subject in a phrase from then-Bulls' commentator, Stacey King, who would exclaim after a good defensive play, "there's five Javonte's out there!".

=== Santa Cruz Warriors (2023–2024) ===
On October 16, 2023, Green signed with the Golden State Warriors, but was waived three days later. On October 30, he joined the Santa Cruz Warriors.

=== Return to Chicago (2024) ===
On March 23, 2024, Green signed a 10-day contract with the Bulls and on April 4, he signed for the remainder of the season. On April 5, Green recorded a career high in both points and rebounds, scoring 25 points and recording 13 rebounds in a 108–100 victory against the New York Knicks.

=== New Orleans Pelicans (2024–2025) ===
On August 22, 2024, Green signed with the New Orleans Pelicans. On February 20, 2025, Green and the Pelicans agreed to a contract buyout.

=== Cleveland Cavaliers (2025) ===
On February 23, 2025, Green signed with the Cleveland Cavaliers.

=== Detroit Pistons (2025–present) ===
On August 15, 2025, Green signed a one-year contract with the Detroit Pistons. He was the only Piston to appear in every regular season game (82 games) in the 2025–26 season. In those games (which included six starts), Green recorded averages of 6.9 points, 2.8 rebounds, and 0.7 assists.

On July 3, 2026, Green re-signed with the Pistons on a one-year veteran minimum contract.

== International career ==
Green is a dual-citizen of the United States and Montenegro. He made his debut with the Montenegro national basketball team in 2017 during the European 2019 FIBA Basketball World Cup qualifiers, averaging 11 points, 4.5 rebounds and four steals in two games.

== Career statistics ==
Legend
GP	Games played	GS	Games started	MPG	Minutes per game
FG%	Field goal percentage	3P%	3-point field goal percentage	FT%	Free throw percentage
RPG	Rebounds per game	APG	Assists per game	SPG	Steals per game
BPG	Blocks per game	PPG	Points per game	**Bold**	Career high
*	Led the league

=== NBA ===
==== Regular season ====
Year	Team	GP	GS	MPG	FG%	3P%	FT%	RPG	APG	SPG	BPG	PPG
2019–20	Boston	48	2	9.7	.500	.273	.667	1.9	.5	.5	.2	3.4
2020–21	Boston	25	2	13.8	.549	.318	.667	2.1	.4	.7	.1	4.2
2020–21	Chicago	16	0	8.0	.452	.375	**1.000**	1.2	.4	.6	.3	2.6
2021–22	Chicago	65	**45**	23.4	.542	.356	.833	4.2	**.9**	1.0	.5	7.2
2022–23	Chicago	32	1	15.0	.565	.371	.667	2.8	.7	.8	.7	5.2
2023–24	Chicago	9	5	**25.6**	**.600**	.370	.769	**7.4**	.6	1.1	**.9**	**12.2**
2024–25	New Orleans	50	18	21.8	.446	.352	.758	3.6	**.9**	1.1	.6	5.8
2024–25	Cleveland	18	1	9.2	.365	.242	.500	2.2	.6	.6	.1	3.3
2025–26	Detroit	**82***	6	17.6	.447	**.381**	.840	2.8	.7	**1.2**	.3	6.9
Career		345	80	17.0	.491	.355	.773	3.0	.7	.9	.4	5.7

==== Playoffs ====
Year	Team	GP	GS	MPG	FG%	3P%	FT%	RPG	APG	SPG	BPG	PPG
2020	Boston	1	0	6.0	**.500**	**.500**	—	1.0	.0	.0	.0	**3.0**
2022	Chicago	5	**1**	**14.4**	.176	.000	.500	**3.0**	**.4**	**1.8**	.0	1.4
2025	Cleveland	6	0	6.5	.400	.200	**1.000**	1.5	.3	.7	.0	2.5
2026	Detroit	**11**	0	12.0	.300	.259	.833	1.8	.3	.5	**.5**	2.7
Career		23	1	10.8	.288	.225	.857	2.0	.3	.8	.2	2.4

=== College ===
Year	Team	GP	GS	MPG	FG%	3P%	FT%	RPG	APG	SPG	BPG	PPG
2011–12	Radford	32	22	22.0	.467	.194	.618	6.7	.6	1.4	.5	10.2
2012–13	Radford	32	32	**27.7**	.504	.192	.592	8.1	**1.3**	**2.1**	.7	14.6
2013–14	Radford	**35**	**34**	25.6	**.548**	**.343**	.686	8.1	1.1	1.9	.6	**16.9**
2014–15	Radford	34	**34**	26.2	.544	.111	**.697**	**9.0**	**1.3**	1.9	**.9**	15.4
Career		133	122	25.4	.519	.238	.656	8.0	1.1	1.8	.7	14.4

== Personal life ==
Green has two daughters and one son.
