= Gabe Rogers =

American basketball player

Personal information
- Born: May 19, 1990 (age 36) Houston, Texas
- Listed height: 6 ft 2 in (1.88 m)

Career information
- College: Northern Arizona (2009–2013)
- NBA draft: 2013: undrafted
- Playing career: 2013–2018
- Position: Guard
- Number: 11

Career history
- 2014–2016: CB Marín Peixegalego
- 2016: Palma Air Europa
- 2017: CB Marín Peixegalego
- 2017–2018: Mexico City Capitanes

Career highlights
- All-LEB Plata Team (2016); Second-team All-Big Sky (2011)

Gabriel Antony Rogers (born 19 May 1990) is an American professional basketball player, who played as a guard for Northern Arizona University and in Spain and Mexico.

== Playing career ==
Rogers played for Northern Arizona University where he went on to lead the Big Sky Conference in scoring his senior year. He was drafted in the NBA D-League by the Erie BayHawks in 2013 and was waived twelve days after he was drafted. Rogers started to play professionally overseas in 2014 with Marín Peixefresco in the Spanish LEB Plata. He promoted with the Galician team to LEB Oro in March 2016, finishing the league as the top scorer of the season and as a member of the All-LEB Plata Team.

== Honors ==
=== With Peixefresco ===
- LEB Plata: (1)
  - 2016
- Copa LEB Plata: (1)
  - 2016
