= CB Marín Peixegalego =

- Nickname: Peixes
- Leagues: LEB Oro
- Founded: June 23, 2003
- Arena: Pabellón de A Raña
- Location: Marín, Galicia, Spain
- Team colors: Blue, and White
- Head coach: Javier Llorente
- Championships: 1 LEB Plata; 1 Copa LEB Plata; 1 Liga EBA
- Website: Official website
Home	Away

Club Baloncesto Marín Peixegalego, also known as Marín Ence Peixegalego for sponsorship reasons, is a Spanish professional basketball team based in Marín, Galicia. The team currently plays in LEB Oro, the second league on the Spanish basketball pyramid.

== History ==
Original logo, used until 2018.

The Peixe played in Liga EBA until 2013, when, after playing its second promotion playoffs, it achieved a vacant berth in LEB Plata, the third tier.

On 25 March 2016, Marín were promoted to the second tier, LEB Oro, after finishing the season as champion of the LEB Plata and the Copa LEB Plata.

The club ended its debut in LEB Oro in last place, and was consequently relegated to LEB Plata. However, on 18 July 2017, the club announced it could not fulfil the requirements in the league and it would appeal against the decision of FEB. However, the appeal was denied and the club finally registered in the fourth-division Liga EBA.

After their forced relegation, the club returned to LEB Plata after completing a perfect season with 34 wins in 34 matches. Peixe achieved a new promotion on 25 May 2019, coming back to the LEB Oro three years later after their debut season.

== Season by season ==
Season	Tier	Division	Pos.	W–L	Cup competitions	
2005–06	5	1ª División	3rd (Note: Promoted to Liga EBA)	16–12		
2006–07	5	Liga EBA	12th	10–16		
2007–08	5	Liga EBA	9th	15–15		
2008–09	5	Liga EBA	15th (Note: Avoided relegation by achieving a vacant spot.)	9–19		
2009–10	4	Liga EBA	9th	14–14		
2010–11	4	Liga EBA	2nd	20–6		
2011–12	4	Liga EBA	4th	15–7		
2012–13	4	Liga EBA	3rd (Note: Promoted to LEB Plata)	17–6		
2013–14	3	LEB Plata	11th	9–15		
2014–15	3	LEB Plata	6th	17–14		
2015–16	3	LEB Plata	1st	20–6	Copa LEB Plata	C
2016–17	2	LEB Oro	18th (Note: Relegated to Liga EBA after not being admitted to LEB Plata)	8–26		
2017–18	4	Liga EBA	1st	34–0		
2018–19	3	LEB Plata	3rd	20–16		
2019–20	2	LEB Oro	18th (Note: Season curtailed due to the COVID-19 pandemic.)	4–20		

== Players ==
=== Current roster ===
Note: Flags indicate national team eligibility at FIBA-sanctioned events. Players may hold other non-FIBA nationalities not displayed.

CB Marín Peixegalego roster
Players
Coaches

Pos.	No.	Nat.	Name	Ht.	Age
PG	4	(Spain)	De Benito, Jacobo	1.80 m (5 ft 11 in)	36 – 9 June 1990
SG	5	(Spain)	Castro, Pablo	1.87 m (6 ft 2 in)	24 – 4 January 2002
G	6	(Spain)	Villalobos, Daniel	1.89 m (6 ft 2 in)	29 – 2 May 1997
F/C	8	(Spain)	Dominguez, Javier	2.00 m (6 ft 7 in)	32 – 20 February 1994
SG	9	(Spain)	Castro, Juan	1.98 m (6 ft 6 in)	28 – 21 June 1998
F	10	(Spain)	Filgueira, Alvaro	1.95 m (6 ft 5 in)	28 – 20 April 1998
G/F	15	(United States)	Hogan, Dramel	1.95 m (6 ft 5 in)	36 – 4 December 1989
F/C	16	(Netherlands)	van Wijk, Kevin	2.03 m (6 ft 8 in)	37 – 17 April 1989
G	22	(United States)	Monaghan, Zach	1.88 m (6 ft 2 in)	33 – 1 December 1992
G/F	23	(Spain)	Orellano, Juan Martin	1.99 m (6 ft 6 in)	37 – 27 February 1989
SG	32	(Spain)	Arroyo, Hector	1.85 m (6 ft 1 in)	27 – 20 March 1999
PG	33	(Spain)	Casal, Antonio	1.81 m (5 ft 11 in)	21 – 2 September 2005

Head coach

- (Spain) Javier Llorente

Legend

- (C) Team captain
- Injured

=== Depth chart ===
Pos.	Starting 5	Bench 1	Bench 2
C	Kevin van Wijk	Alvaro Filgueira
PF	Javier Dominguez	Daniel Villalobos
SF	Dramel Hogan	Pablo Castro	Juan Martin Orellano
SG	Juan Castro	Hector Arroyo
PG	Zach Monaghan	Jacobo De Benito	Antonio Casal

== Trophies and awards ==
=== Trophies ===
- LEB Plata: (1)
  - 2016
- Copa LEB Plata: (1)
  - 2016
- Liga EBA: (1)
  - 2018

=== Awards ===
LEB Plata MVP

- Javonte Green – 2016

== Notable players ==
To appear in this section a player must have either:

- Set a club record or won an individual award as a professional player.
- Played at least one official international match for his senior national team or one NBA game at any time.
- (Dominican Republic) José Acosta
- (Jamaica) Garfield Blair
- (United States) (Montenegro) Javonte Green
