= Beau Levesque =

American basketball player and coach

Los Angeles Lakers
- Position: Assistant coach
- League: NBA

Personal information
- Born: May 21, 1991 (age 35) San Mateo County, California, U.S.

Career information
- College: Saint Mary's (2009–2014)
- Playing career: 2014–2016
- Coaching career: 2017–present

Career history

Playing
- 2014–2015: Oviedo
- 2015–2016: Araberri

Coaching
- 2018–2020: St. John's (graduate assistant)
- 2018–2020: Brooklyn Nets (player development coach)
- 2020–2024: Los Angeles Clippers (player development coach)
- 2024–present: Los Angeles Lakers (assistant)

Beau Raymond Levesque (born May 26, 1991) is an American professional basketball coach and former player who is an assistant coach for the Los Angeles Lakers of the National Basketball Association (NBA).

== Playing career ==
Levesque played for and graduated from Saint Mary's. Levesque played for the Gaels from 2009 to 2014, averaging 6.9 points per game during his collegiate career.

Levesque played for the 2010 Saint Mary's team that advanced to the Sweet 16 at the 2010 NCAA Division I men's basketball tournament, defeating Richmond and Villanova before losing to Baylor.

Levesque missed the entire 2010–11 season due to injury. Levesque also appeared in the 2012 NCAA Division I men's basketball tournament, playing for the 2012 Saint Mary's Gaels that lost in the 2nd round to Purdue.

In Levesque's junior season at Saint Mary's, the Gaels made another trip to the NCAA tournament appearing in the 2013 NCAA Division I men's basketball tournament. Levesque saw action in a 1st round win over Middle Tennessee and a 2nd round loss to Memphis.

Levesque concluded his college basketball career with the Gaels at the 2014 National Invitation Tournament in a loss to Minnesota in the 2nd round.

== Coaching career ==
Levesque began his coaching career in the NBA in 2018 when he was hired as a player development coach for the Brooklyn Nets under head coach Kenny Atkinson.

In 2020, Levesque was hired as a player development coach with the Los Angeles Clippers, working under head coaches Doc Rivers and Tyronn Lue.

In 2024, Levesque was hired as an assistant coach for the Los Angeles Lakers under head coach JJ Redick.
