= Kotooka General Gymnasium =

Gymnasium in Mitane, Akita, Japan

- 三種町琴丘総合体育館
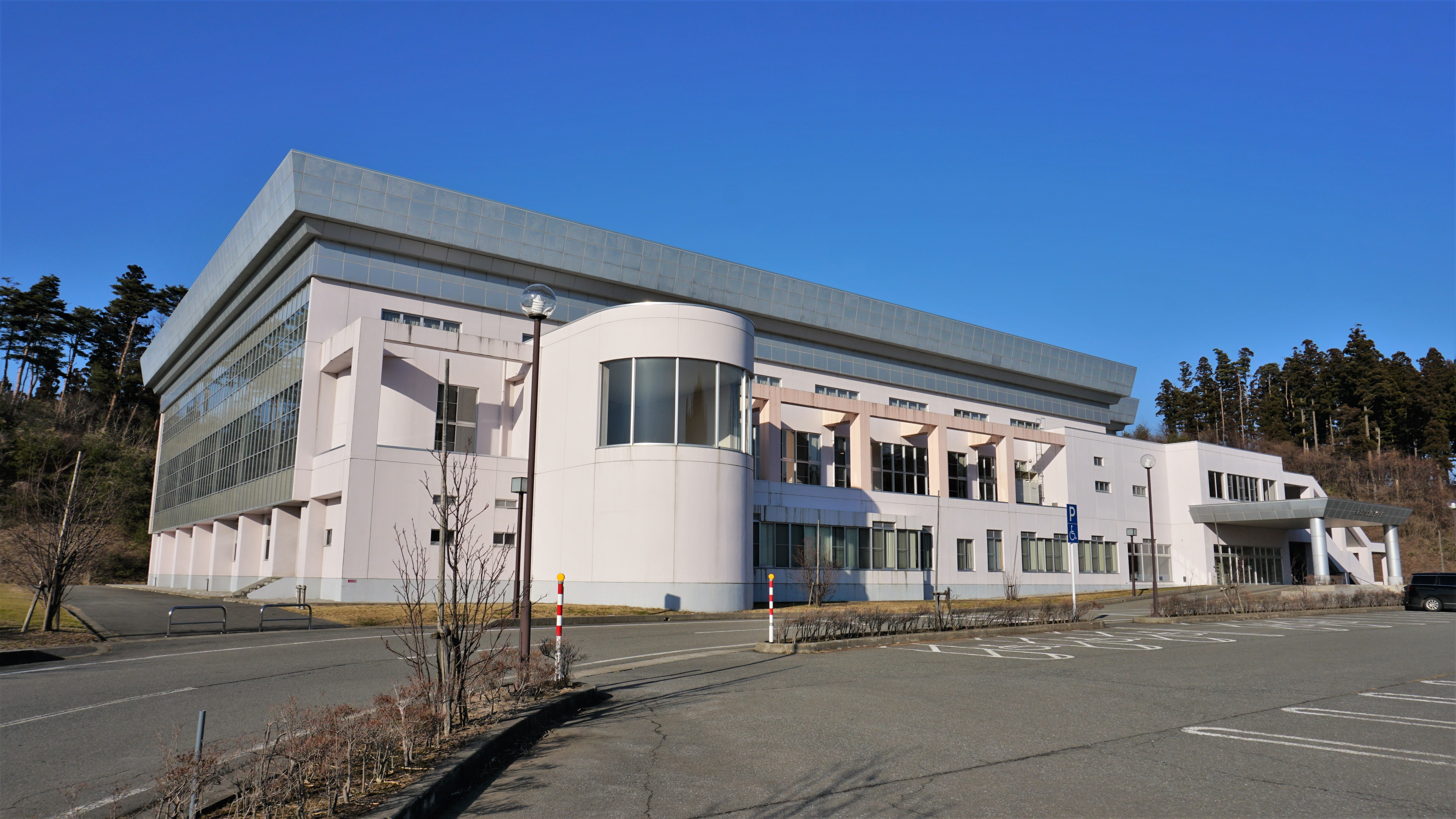

- Location within Akita Prefecture Location within Japan
- Interactive map of Kotooka General Gymnasium
- Full name: Mitane Town Kotooka General Gymnasium
- Address: 75-1 Soto, Aza Banjakudai, Kado, Mitane, Akita, Japan
- Coordinates: 40°02′7.1″N 140°5′56.8″E
- Owner: Mitanecho
- Field size: 1,872 sqm
- Parking: 180 spaces

Construction
- Opened: 9 November 2004

Tenant
- Prestige International Aranmare Akita

Kotooka General Gymnasium is a gymnasium in Mitane, Akita, Japan. It opened in 2004. This building is fully air-conditioned, and hosted National Sports Festival of Japan men's basketball games in 2007.

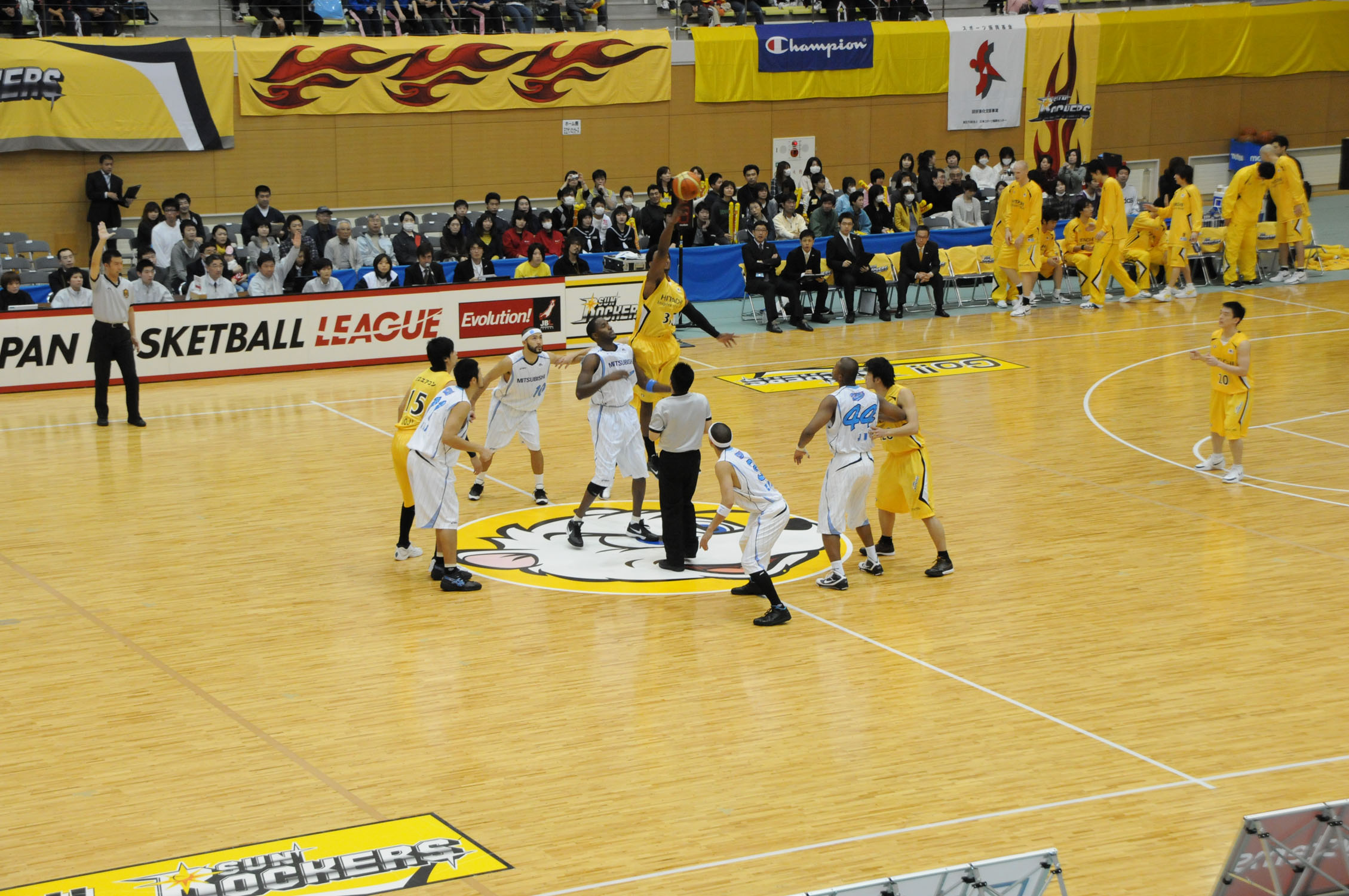
Basketball game

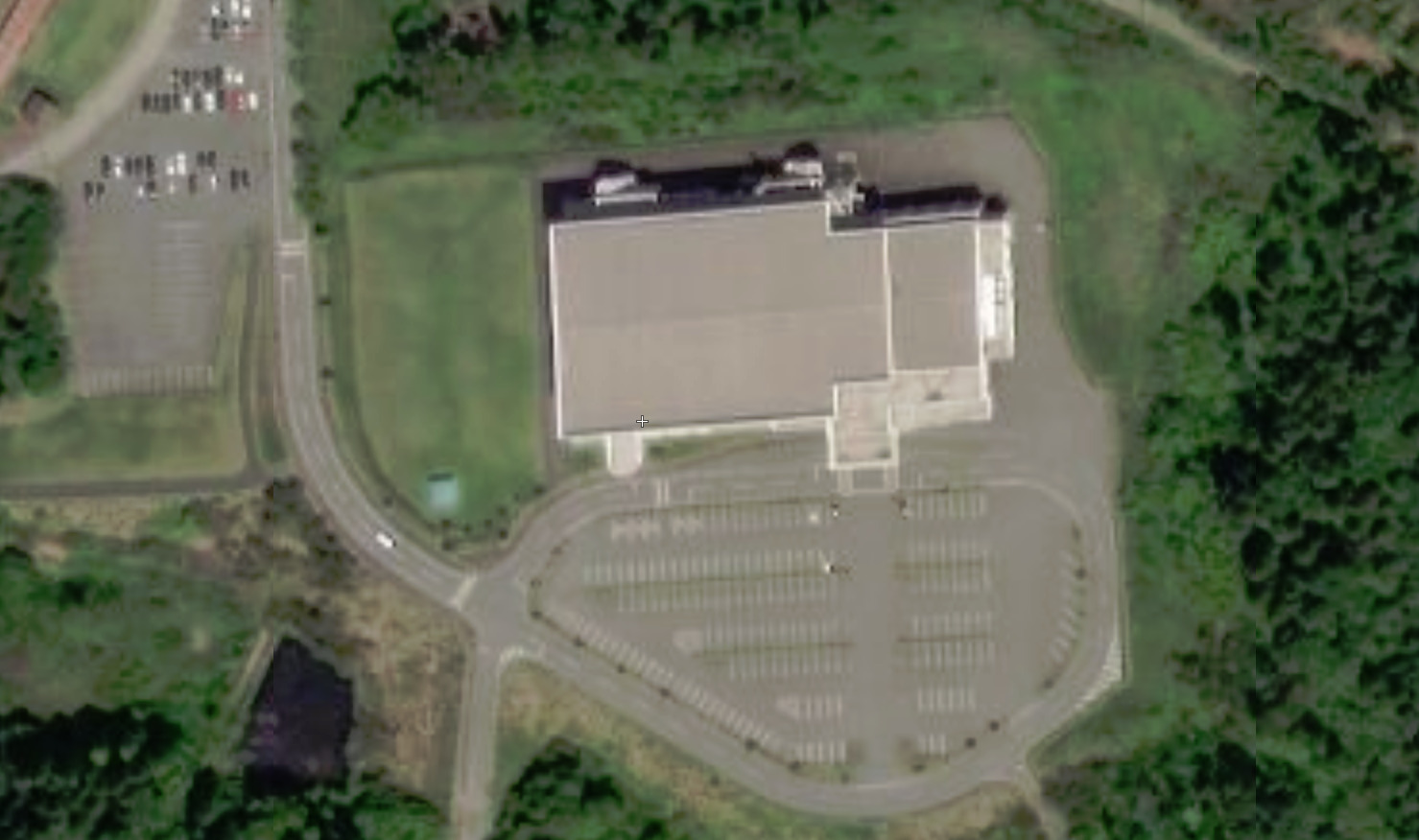
Satellite view
