= Dan McClintock =

American basketball player (born 1977)

Personal information
- Born: April 19, 1977 (age 49) Fountain Valley, California
- Listed height: 7 ft 0 in (2.13 m)
- Listed weight: 264 lb (120 kg)

Career information
- High school: Visalia (Visalia, California)
- College: Northern Arizona (1996–2000)
- NBA draft: 2000: 2nd round, 53rd overall pick
- Drafted by: Denver Nuggets
- Playing career: 2000–2014
- Position: Center
- Number: 50

Career history
- 2000–2001: Kansas City Knights
- 2001: Denver Nuggets
- 2001: Fortitudo Bologna
- 2002: C.S. Borgomanero
- 2002–2003: Shanghai Sharks
- 2003–2004: Ventspils
- 2004–2007: SLUC Nancy
- 2007–2008: EWE Baskets Oldenburg
- 2008–2009: BCM Gravelines
- 2009–2010: MBC Mykolaiv
- 2010–2011: Azovmash Mariupol
- 2011–2012: MBC Mykolaiv
- 2012–2013: Arizona Scorpions
- 2013: AS Monaco Basket
- 2013–2014: Arizona Scorpions
- Stats at NBA.com
- Stats at Basketball Reference

Daniel Raymond McClintock (born April 19, 1977) is a retired American professional basketball player at the center position. He is 7'0" and weighs 260 lb.

He attended Northern Arizona University before being selected with the 53rd overall pick in the 2000 draft by the National Basketball Association's Denver Nuggets. McClintock's NBA career lasted only two weeks as during the 2000–01 NBA season, he only played six games from April 5 to April 18 while averaging 3.0 points and 2.8 rebounds per contest. His final NBA game was on April 18, 2001, in a 110–100 win over the Sacramento Kings. He recorded 2 points and 5 rebounds in his final game.

He later played for MBС Mykolaiv of the Ukrainian Basketball Super League and other teams in Europe.
