= 2020–21 EuroLeague regular season =

European basketball competition

The 2020–21 EuroLeague Regular Season will be played from 1 October 2020 to 9 April 2021. A total of 18 teams compete in the regular season to decide the eight places of the playoffs.

== Format ==
In the regular season, teams play against each other home-and-away in a round-robin format. The eight first qualified teams will advance to the Playoffs, while the last ten qualified teams will be eliminated. The matchdays are from 1 October 2020 to 9 April 2021.

=== Tiebreakers ===
When all teams have played each other twice:

1. Best record in head-to-head games between all tied teams.
2. Higher cumulative score difference in head-to-head games between all tied teams.
3. Higher cumulative score difference for the entire regular season.
4. Higher total of points scored for the entire regular season.
5. Higher sum of quotients of points in favor and points against of each match played in the regular season.

If a tiebreaker does not resolve a tie completely, a new tiebreak process is initiated with only those teams that remain tied. All points scored in extra periods will not be counted in the standings, nor for any tie-break situation.

== League table ==
Pos	Team	Pld	W	L	PF	PA	PD	Qualification
1	(Spain) Barcelona	34	24	10	2706	2469	+237	Qualification to playoffs
2	(Russia) CSKA Moscow	34	24	10	2817	2662	+155	Qualification to playoffs
3	(Turkey) Anadolu Efes	34	22	12	2838	2604	+234	Qualification to playoffs
4	(Italy) A|X Armani Exchange Milan	34	21	13	2720	2599	+121	Qualification to playoffs
5	(Germany) Bayern Munich	34	21	13	2633	2599	+34	Qualification to playoffs
6	(Spain) Real Madrid	34	20	14	2667	2593	+74	Qualification to playoffs
7	(Turkey) Fenerbahçe Beko	34	20	14	2661	2679	−18	Qualification to playoffs
8	(Russia) Zenit Saint Petersburg	34	20	14	2670	2547	+123	Qualification to playoffs
9	(Spain) Valencia Basket	34	19	15	2762	2743	+19	
10	(Spain) TD Systems Baskonia	34	18	16	2742	2619	+123	
11	(Lithuania) Žalgiris	34	17	17	2630	2645	−15	
12	(Greece) Olympiacos	34	16	18	2628	2674	−46	
13	(Israel) Maccabi Tel Aviv	34	14	20	2608	2642	−34	
14	(France) LDLC ASVEL	34	13	21	2590	2714	−124	
15	(Germany) ALBA Berlin	34	12	22	2652	2790	−138	
16	(Greece) Panathinaikos OPAP	34	11	23	2656	2782	−126	
17	(Serbia) Crvena zvezda mts	34	10	24	2499	2684	−185	
18	(Russia) Khimki	34	4	30	2616	3050	−434	

Source: EuroLeague
Rules for classification: All points scored in extra period(s) will not be counted in the standings, nor for any tie-break situation.

=== Positions by round ===
The table lists the positions of teams after completion of each round. In order to preserve chronological evolvements, any postponed matches are not included in the round at which they were originally scheduled, but added to the full round they were played immediately afterwards.

Team ╲ Round	1	2	3	4	5	6	7	8	9	10	11	12	13	14	15	16	17	18	19	20	21	22	23	24	25	26	27	28	29	30	31	32	33	34
Barcelona	3	7	7	5	3	2	1	1	1	1	1	1	1	1	2	2	3	2	2	2	1	1	1	1	1	1	1	1	1	1	1	1	1	1
CSKA Moscow	16	13	9	10	13	8	7	4	3	3	2	2	2	2	1	1	1	1	1	1	2	2	2	2	3	2	2	2	3	2	2	2	2	2
Anadolu Efes	14	14	12	14	14	12	9	7	8	7	6	7	9	10	10	9	11	11	9	7	8	8	9	8	8	7	6	5	4	3	3	3	3	3
AX Armani Exchange Milan	9	3	8	4	5	4	8	11	12	10	6	5	7	7	5	7	8	7	6	5	4	3	3	3	2	3	3	3	2	4	4	4	4	4
Bayern Munich	10	6	4	2	1	3	3	2	2	2	4	3	3	4	3	4	4	6	4	6	7	7	5	5	5	5	4	4	5	5	5	6	6	5
Real Madrid	17	18	15	15	16	15	11	8	6	5	7	6	4	3	4	3	2	3	3	3	5	4	4	4	4	4	7	6	6	7	7	8	7	6
Fenerbahçe Beko	1	1	3	9	11	6	5	9	10	13	13	12	14	14	17	14	13	13	11	11	11	9	8	6	6	8	8	7	7	6	6	5	5	7
Zenit Saint Petersburg	5	5	2	6	7	9	12	10	11	9	5	4	6	6	7	6	5	4	5	4	3	5	6	7	7	6	5	8	8	8	8	10	8	8
Valencia Basket	7	2	6	8	4	5	4	6	5	4	3	8	5	5	6	5	7	8	10	9	9	10	11	10	10	9	11	11	10	10	10	9	10	9
TD Systems Baskonia	2	11	10	7	8	10	13	14	13	11	10	9	10	11	11	10	9	10	12	13	13	13	13	11	11	11	10	10	9	9	9	7	9	10
Žalgiris	8	4	1	1	2	1	2	5	7	8	11	11	11	9	8	8	6	5	7	8	6	6	7	9	9	10	9	9	11	11	11	11	11	11
Olympiacos	11	8	5	3	6	7	6	3	4	6	9	10	8	8	9	11	10	9	8	10	10	11	10	12	13	13	13	13	12	12	12	12	12	12
Maccabi Tel Aviv	4	10	13	13	12	14	15	12	14	14	16	15	13	13	13	12	12	12	13	12	12	12	12	13	14	14	14	14	14	14	13	13	13	13
LDLC ASVEL	13	16	16	17	17	18	16	16	18	18	14	17	17	15	15	16	17	17	17	16	17	14	14	14	12	12	12	12	13	13	14	14	14	14
ALBA Berlin	15	17	18	16	15	16	17	17	16	16	16	14	12	12	12	13	14	14	14	15	14	15	16	16	16	16	16	15	15	15	15	15	16	15
Panathinaikos OPAP	6	12	11	12	9	11	14	15	15	15	15	13	15	16	14	15	16	16	15	17	15	16	15	15	15	15	15	16	16	16	16	16	15	16
Crvena zvezda mts	18	9	14	11	10	13	10	13	9	12	12	16	16	17	16	17	15	15	16	14	16	17	17	17	17	17	17	17	17	17	17	17	17	17
Khimki	12	15	17	18	18	17	18	18	17	17	18	18	18	18	18	18	18	18	18	18	18	18	18	18	18	18	18	18	18	18	18	18	18	18

Leader and qualification to playoffs
Qualification to playoffs

Updated to match(es) played on 14 April 2021. Source: EuroLeague

=== Results by round ===
The table lists the results of teams in each round.

Team ╲ Round	1	2	3	4	5	6	7	8	9	10	11	12	13	14	15	16	17	18	19	20	21	22	23	24	25	26	27	28	29	30	31	32	33	34
Barcelona	W	L	W	W	W	W	W	W	L	W	L	W	W	W	L	L	L	W	W	W	W	W	W	L	W	L	W	W	W	W	W	L	W	L
CSKA Moscow	L	W	W	L	L	W	W	W	W	W	W	W	W	W	W	W	W	L	W	L	L	W	L	L	W	W	W	L	L	W	W	W	W	W
Anadolu Efes	L	L	W	L	W	W	W	W	L	W	W	L	L	L	L	W	L	W	W	W	L	W	W	W	W	W	W	W	W	L	W	W	W	L
AX Armani Exchange Milan	W	W	L	W	L	W	L	W	L	W	W	L	L	W	W	L	L	W	W	W	W	W	W	L	W	W	L	W	W	L	L	W	L	W
Bayern Munich	L	W	W	W	W	L	W	W	W	L	L	W	W	L	W	L	W	L	W	L	L	W	W	W	L	W	W	W	L	W	L	L	W	W
Real Madrid	L	L	W	L	L	W	W	W	W	W	L	W	W	W	W	W	W	L	L	W	L	W	W	L	L	W	L	W	L	L	W	L	W	W
Fenerbahçe Beko	W	W	L	L	L	W	W	L	L	L	L	W	L	L	L	W	W	W	W	W	W	W	W	W	W	L	W	W	L	W	W	W	L	L
Zenit Saint Petersburg	W	W	W	W	W	W	L	W	L	W	W	L	L	W	L	W	W	W	L	W	W	L	L	L	W	L	W	L	L	L	W	L	W	W
Valencia Basket	W	W	L	L	W	L	W	L	W	W	W	L	W	W	L	W	L	L	L	W	L	L	L	W	W	W	L	L	W	W	W	L	W	W
TD Systems Baskonia	W	L	L	W	L	L	L	L	W	W	W	W	L	L	L	W	W	W	L	L	L	L	W	W	W	W	W	L	W	W	W	W	L	L
Žalgiris	W	W	W	W	L	W	L	L	L	L	L	L	W	W	W	W	W	W	L	L	W	W	L	W	L	L	W	L	L	L	L	W	L	W
Olympiacos	L	W	W	W	L	L	W	W	W	W	L	L	W	L	L	L	W	W	W	L	L	L	L	L	L	L	L	W	W	W	L	W	L	W
Maccabi Tel Aviv	W	L	L	L	W	L	L	W	L	L	L	W	W	L	W	W	L	W	L	W	W	L	L	W	L	L	L	W	L	L	W	W	L	L
LDLC ASVEL	L	L	W	L	L	L	W	L	L	L	W	L	L	W	W	L	L	L	L	W	W	W	W	W	W	W	L	L	L	W	L	L	L	L
ALBA Berlin	L	L	L	W	W	L	L	L	W	L	W	W	W	W	L	L	L	L	L	L	W	L	L	L	L	W	L	W	W	L	L	L	L	W
Panathinaikos OPAP	W	L	L	L	W	L	L	L	L	L	W	W	L	L	W	L	L	L	W	L	W	L	W	W	L	L	L	L	W	L	L	L	W	L
Crvena zvezda mts	L	W	L	W	W	L	L	L	W	L	L	L	L	L	W	L	W	L	W	L	L	L	L	L	L	L	L	L	W	W	L	L	W	L
Khimki	L	L	L	L	L	W	L	L	W	L	L	L	L	L	L	L	L	L	L	L	L	L	L	L	L	L	W	L	L	L	L	W	L	L

Win
Loss

Updated to match(es) played on 14 April 2021. Source: EuroLeague

== Matches ==
=== Round 1 ===
1 October 2020	Anadolu Efes (Turkey)	69–73	(Russia) Zenit Saint Petersburg	Istanbul
19:30 (CET)	Scoring by quarter: 10–15, 16–11, 28–23, 15–24
	Pts: Micić 17; Rebs: Moerman, Singleton 5 Asts: Micić 9 PIR: Simon 16	Boxscore	Pts: Pangos 23; Rebs: Thomas 6 Asts: Pangos 7 PIR: Pangos 25	Arena: Sinan Erdem Dome; Attendance: 0 Referees: Luigi Lamonica, Oļegs Latiševs, Milan Nedović

1 October 2020	Olympiacos (Greece)	67–68	(Lithuania) Žalgiris	Piraeus
20:00 (CET)	Scoring by quarter: 18–23, 19–11, 21–13, 9–21
	Pts: Martin 12; Rebs: Vezenkov 5 Asts: Sloukas 7 PIR: Martin 16	Boxscore	Pts: Grigonis 15; Rebs: Hayes 7 Asts: Grigonis 4 PIR: Grigonis 17	Arena: Peace and Friendship Stadium; Attendance: 0 Referees: Carmelo Paternicò, Mehdi Difallah, Amit Balak

1 October 2020	Maccabi Tel Aviv (Israel)	80–73	(Germany) ALBA Berlin	Tel Aviv
20:05 (CET)	Scoring by quarter: 19–29, 30–12, 18–17, 13–15
	Pts: Caloiaro 18; Rebs: Wilbekin 7 Asts: Jones 7 PIR: Caloiaro 25	Boxscore	Pts: Eriksson 18; Rebs: Fontecchio 8 Asts: Siva 7 PIR: Fontecchio 27	Arena: Menora Mivtachim Arena; Attendance: 0 Referees: Borys Ryzhyk, Matej Boltauzer, Jordi Aliaga

1 October 2020	Barcelona (Spain)	76–66	(Russia) CSKA Moscow	Barcelona
21:00 (CET)	Scoring by quarter: 24–14, 17–19, 14–15, 21–18
	Pts: Davies 18; Rebs: Abrines, Mirotić 7 Asts: Calathes 7 PIR: Abrines 22	Boxscore	Pts: Shengelia 15; Rebs: Shengelia 5 Asts: James 4 PIR: Shengelia 20	Arena: Palau Blaugrana; Attendance: 0 Referees: Christos Christodoulou, Damir Javor, Michele Rossi

1 October 2020	Valencia Basket (Spain)	65–63	(France) LDLC ASVEL	Valencia
21:00 (CET)	Scoring by quarter: 18–17, 19–16, 13–14, 15–16
	Pts: Williams 15; Rebs: Dubljević, Williams 5 Asts: Kalinić, Prepelič 3 PIR: Williams 18	Boxscore	Pts: Fall 14; Rebs: Noua 8 Asts: Cole 6 PIR: Fall 18	Arena: La Fonteta; Attendance: 389; Referees: Saša Pukl, Fernando Rocha, Elias Koromilas

2 October 2020	Khimki (Russia)	76–78	(Greece) Panathinaikos OPAP	Khimki
19:00 (CET)	Scoring by quarter: 17–24, 22–17, 23–18, 14–19
	Pts: Booker 15; Rebs: Jerebko 9 Asts: Zaytsev 5 PIR: Zaytsev 17	Boxscore	Pts: Papapetrou 16; Rebs: Mitoglou 9 Asts: Nedović 4 PIR: Papapetrou 18	Arena: Mytishchi Arena; Attendance: 933; Referees: Milivoje Jovčić, Tomislav Hordov, Igor Dragojević

2 October 2020	Fenerbahçe Beko (Turkey)	77–63	(Serbia) Crvena zvezda mts	Istanbul
19:45 (CET)	Scoring by quarter: 24–20, 18–11, 15–11, 20–22
	Pts: Brown 17; Rebs: Veselý 8 Asts: De Colo 7 PIR: De Colo 16	Boxscore	Pts: Loyd 15; Rebs: Kuzmić 7 Asts: Loyd 4 PIR: Kuzmić 12	Arena: Ülker Sports and Event Hall; Attendance: 0 Referees: Luigi Lamonica, Oļegs Latiševs, Milan Nedović

2 October 2020	Bayern Munich (Germany)	79–81(OT)	(Italy) A|X Armani Exchange Milan	Munich
20:30 (CET)	Scoring by quarter: 14–15, 17–17, 24–22, 15–16, Overtime: 9–11
	Pts: Baldwin 18; Rebs: Reynolds 11; Asts: Đedović 7 PIR: Reynolds 19	Boxscore	Pts: Delaney 17; Rebs: Brooks 5 Asts: Delaney 8 PIR: Delaney 22	Arena: Audi Dome; Attendance: 0 Referees: Miguel Ángel Pérez, Sašo Petek, Piotr Pastusiak

2 October 2020	TD Systems Baskonia (Spain)	76–63	(Spain) Real Madrid	Vitoria-Gasteiz
21:00 (CET)	Scoring by quarter: 15–16, 18–13, 19–20, 24–14
	Pts: Henry 23; Rebs: Polonara 9 Asts: Henry 6 PIR: Henry 32	Boxscore	Pts: Campazzo 17; Rebs: Tavares 7 Asts: Campazzo 17; PIR: Tavares 17	Arena: Buesa Arena; Attendance: 400; Referees: Sreten Radović, Joseph Bissang, Mario Majkić

=== Round 2 ===
8 October 2020	CSKA Moscow (Russia)	76–72	(Israel) Maccabi Tel Aviv	Moscow
19:00 (CET)	Scoring by quarter: 20–15, 11–15, 14–14, 31–28
	Pts: James 25; Rebs: Shengelia 12; Asts: James, Shengelia 3 PIR: James 28	Boxscore	Pts: Wilbekin 20; Rebs: Žižić 9 Asts: Wilbekin 5 PIR: Wilbekin 20	Arena: Megasport Arena; Attendance: 3,587; Referees: Ilija Belošević, Emin Moğulkoç, Robert Vyklický

8 October 2020	Anadolu Efes (Turkey)	71–80	(Turkey) Fenerbahçe Beko	Istanbul
19:30 (CET)	Scoring by quarter: 23–16, 12–26, 19–19, 17–19
	Pts: Simon 24; Rebs: Moerman, Pleiß 6 Asts: Balbay, Simon 5 PIR: Simon 34	Boxscore	Pts: De Colo 20; Rebs: Veselý 10; Asts: De Colo 4 PIR: De Colo 28	Arena: Sinan Erdem Dome; Attendance: 0 Referees: Borys Ryzhyk, Juan Carlos García, Saša Pukl

8 October 2020	Real Madrid (Spain)	77–93	(Spain) Valencia Basket	Madrid
21:00 (CET)	Scoring by quarter: 19–17, 20–27, 14–24, 24–25
	Pts: Tavares 15; Rebs: Deck, Tavares 7 Asts: Abalde, Llull 4 PIR: Tavares 24	Boxscore	Pts: Dubljević 24; Rebs: Kalinić 8 Asts: Hermannsson, Van Rossom 4 PIR: Dubljević 23	Arena: WiZink Center; Attendance: 0 Referees: Damir Javor, Piotr Pastusiak, Sébastien Clivaz

9 October 2020	Zenit Saint Petersburg (Russia)	74–70	(Spain) Barcelona	Saint Petersburg
19:00 (CET)	Scoring by quarter: 16–19, 19–19, 19–17, 20–15
	Pts: Baron, Poythress 16; Rebs: Poythress 11; Asts: Ponitka, Thomas 3 PIR: Poythress 22	Boxscore	Pts: Mirotić 14; Rebs: Mirotić 7 Asts: Calathes 5 PIR: Mirotić 22	Arena: Yubileyny Sports Palace; Attendance: 2,772; Referees: Sreten Radović, Artem Lavrukhin

9 October 2020	Crvena zvezda mts (Serbia)	90–73	(Spain) TD Systems Baskonia	Belgrade
19:00 (CET)	Scoring by quarter: 23–16, 13–15, 29–18, 25–24
	Pts: Loyd 30; Rebs: Kuzmić 8 Asts: Hall 11; PIR: Loyd 34	Boxscore	Pts: Giedraitis 26; Rebs: Jekiri 5 Asts: Henry 10; PIR: Henry 19	Arena: Aleksandar Nikolić Hall; Attendance: 0 Referees: Christos Christodoulou, Mehdi Difallah, Kristaps Konstantinovs

9 October 2020	ALBA Berlin (Germany)	72–90	(Germany) Bayern Munich	Berlin
20:00 (CET)	Scoring by quarter: 27–21, 9–31, 18–19, 18–19
	Pts: Eriksson 15; Rebs: three players 3 Asts: Granger 6 PIR: Granger 17	Boxscore	Pts: Weiler-Babb 15; Rebs: Lučić 6 Asts: three players 4 PIR: Lučić 23	Arena: Mercedes-Benz Arena; Attendance: 599; Referees: Carmelo Paternicò, Fernando Rocha, Hugues Thépénier

9 October 2020	Panathinaikos OPAP (Greece)	71–78	(Greece) Olympiacos	Marousi
20:00 (CET)	Scoring by quarter: 12–22, 23–22, 22–18, 14–16
	Pts: Foster 15; Rebs: Papagiannis 7 Asts: Papapetrou 4 PIR: Papagiannis 17	Boxscore	Pts: Printezis 17; Rebs: Ellis 13; Asts: McKissic 3 PIR: Ellis, Vezenkov 17	Arena: O.A.K.A. Attendance: 0 Referees: Daniel Hierrenzuelo, Joseph Bissang, Gytis Vilius

9 October 2020	A|X Armani Exchange Milan (Italy)	87–73	(France) LDLC ASVEL	Milan
20:45 (CET)	Scoring by quarter: 20–17, 25–23, 16–14, 26–19
	Pts: Shields 17; Rebs: LeDay 9 Asts: Delaney 8 PIR: Shields 19	Boxscore	Pts: Noua 12; Rebs: Fall 8 Asts: Cole, Diot 3 PIR: Noua 16	Arena: Mediolanum Forum; Attendance: 731; Referees: Robert Lottermoser, Sérgio Silva, Eduard Udyanskyy

10 October 2020	Khimki (Russia)	70–84	(Lithuania) Žalgiris	Khimki
19:00 (CET)	Scoring by quarter: 20–17, 12–24, 16–26, 22–17
	Pts: Jerebko 23; Rebs: Jerebko 12; Asts: Vyaltsev 5 PIR: Jerebko 30	Boxscore	Pts: Grigonis 21; Rebs: Geben 6 Asts: Walkup 6 PIR: Grigonis 23	Arena: Mytishchi Arena; Attendance: 627; Referees: Ilija Belošević, Emin Moğulkoç, Robert Vyklický

=== Round 3 ===
13 October 2020	Crvena zvezda mts (Serbia)	69–75	(Lithuania) Žalgiris	Belgrade
19:00 (CET)	Scoring by quarter: 19–19, 14–20, 27–23, 9–13
	Pts: Loyd 19; Rebs: Kuzmić 6 Asts: four players 3 PIR: Loyd 16	Boxscore	Pts: Lekavičius 16; Rebs: Lauvergne 8 Asts: Jokubaitis 5 PIR: Lekavičius 20	Arena: Aleksandar Nikolić Hall; Attendance: 0 Referees: Anne Panther, Carlos Cortés, Spiros Gkontas

13 October 2020	ALBA Berlin (Germany)	72–93	(Turkey) Anadolu Efes	Berlin
20:00 (CET)	Scoring by quarter: 14–29, 21–24, 20–17, 17–23
	Pts: Eriksson 13; Rebs: Thiemann 7 Asts: Granger 8 PIR: two players 16	Boxscore	Pts: Pleiss 23; Rebs: Pleiss 6 Asts: Micić 13; PIR: Pleiss 28	Arena: Mercedes-Benz Arena; Attendance: 0 Referees: Sreten Radović, Milan Nedović, Michele Rossi

13 October 2020	Valencia Basket (Spain)	66–71	(Spain) Barcelona	Valencia
21:00 (CET)	Scoring by quarter: 19–16, 16–17, 9–21, 22–17
	Pts: Dubljević, Kalinić 13; Rebs: Dubljević, Labeyrie 8 Asts: Prepelič 5 PIR: Dubljević 20	Boxscore	Pts: Šmits 15; Rebs: Šmits 7 Asts: Hanga 6 PIR: Šmits 23	Arena: La Fonteta; Attendance: 400; Referees: Christos Christodoulou, Mario Majkić, Jurgis Laurinavičius

14 October 2020	Olympiacos (Greece)	86–75	(Italy) A|X Armani Exchange Milan	Piraeus
18:30 (CET)	Scoring by quarter: 18–21, 18–21, 27–16, 23–17
	Pts: Sloukas 17; Rebs: Martin 8 Asts: Sloukas 11; PIR: Sloukas 28	Boxscore	Pts: Rodríguez 18; Rebs: Tarczewski 6 Asts: Delaney 5 PIR: Rodriguez 20	Arena: Peace and Friendship Stadium; Attendance: 0 Referees: Miguel Ángel Pérez, Seffi Shemmesh, Hugues Thépénier

14 October 2020	Maccabi Tel Aviv (Israel)	82–85	(Germany) Bayern Munich	Tel Aviv
18:30 (CET)	Scoring by quarter: 15–15, 10–19, 30–26, 27–25
	Pts: Wilbekin 27; Rebs: Hunter, Žižić 6 Asts: Wilbekin 7 PIR: Wilbekin 30	Boxscore	Pts: Lučić 26; Rebs: Baldwin 5 Asts: Weiler-Babb 4 PIR: Lučić 29	Arena: Menora Mivtachim Arena; Attendance: 0 Referees: Borys Ryzhyk, Petri Mäntylä, Uroš Nikolić

14 October 2020	Fenerbahçe Beko (Turkey)	77–78(OT)	(Russia) CSKA Moscow	Istanbul
19:45 (CET)	Scoring by quarter: 10–12, 21–20, 20–17, 18–20, Overtime: 8–9
	Pts: de Colo 21; Rebs: Veseleý 7 Asts: Brown 8 PIR: Eddie 21	Boxscore	Pts: Clyburn 26; Rebs: Shengelia 8 Asts: James 6 PIR: Clyburn 27	Arena: Ülker Sports and Event Hall; Attendance: 0 Referees: Robert Lottermoser, Daniel Hierrezuelo, Miloš Koljenšić

14 October 2020	Real Madrid (Spain)	94–85	(Russia) Khimki	Madrid
21:00 (CET)	Scoring by quarter: 25–25, 24–16, 21–16, 24–28
	Pts: Llull 21; Rebs: Deck 5 Asts: Campazzo 8 PIR: Llull 26	Boxscore	Pts: Booker 22; Rebs: Jerebko 9 Asts: Zaytsev 9 PIR: Zaytsev 26	Arena: WiZink Center; Attendance: 0 Referees: Saša Pukl, Mehdi Difallah, Jakub Zamojski

23 November 2020	TD Systems Baskonia (Spain)	70–77	(Russia) Zenit Saint Petersburg	Vitoria-Gasteiz
19:30 (CET)	Scoring by quarter: 13–10, 15–24, 23–22, 19–21
	Pts: Giedraitis 15; Rebs: Jekiri 7 Asts: Vildoza 6 PIR: Giedraitis 16	Boxscore	Pts: Ponitka 18; Rebs: Ponitka 8 Asts: Pangos 10; PIR: Ponitka 28	Arena: Buesa Arena; Attendance: 0 Referees: Saša Pukl, Fernando Rocha, Uroš Obrknežević

1 December 2020	LDLC ASVEL (France)	97–73	(Greece) Panathinaikos OPAP	Villeurbanne
20:45 (CET)	Scoring by quarter: 20–17, 24–13, 24–21, 29–22
	Pts: Lighty 19; Rebs: Yabusele 6 Asts: Cole 5 PIR: Lighty 22	Boxscore	Pts: Papagiannis 14; Rebs: Papagiannis 6 Asts: Sant-Roos 7 PIR: Papagiannis 18	Arena: Astroballe; Attendance: 0 Referees: Ilija Belošević, Jakub Zamojski, Jurgis Laurinavičius

=== Round 4 ===
15 October 2020	Žalgiris (Lithuania)	89–73	(Turkey) Anadolu Efes	Kaunas
19:00 (CET)	Scoring by quarter: 25–16, 16–19, 25–20, 23–18
	Pts: Hayes 17; Rebs: Lauvergne 8 Asts: three players 5 PIR: Hayes 23	Boxscore	Pts: Dunston 20; Rebs: Anderson 5 Asts: Simon 6 PIR: Dunston 32	Arena: Žalgiris Arena; Attendance: 5,011; Referees: Carlos Peruga, Piotr Pastusiak, Gentian Cici

15 October 2020	Barcelona (Spain)	97–89(OT)	(Greece) Panathinaikos OPAP	Barcelona
21:00 (CET)	Scoring by quarter: 13–18, 23–17, 22–23, 17–17, Overtime: 22–14
	Pts: Higgins 24; Rebs: Higgins 7 Asts: Calathes 6 PIR: Higgins 26	Boxscore	Pts: Foster 24; Rebs: Mitoglou 12; Asts: Sant-Roos 5 PIR: Mitoglou 28	Arena: Palau Blaugrana; Attendance: 0 Referees: Luigi Lamonica, Oļegs Latiševs, Gytis Vilius

16 October 2020	CSKA Moscow (Russia)	88–93	(Germany) ALBA Berlin	Moscow
19:00 (CET)	Scoring by quarter: 19–17, 32–30, 14–21, 23–25
	Pts: James 27; Rebs: Shengelia 7 Asts: James 6 PIR: James 23	Boxscore	Pts: Fontecchio 20; Rebs: Sikma 9 Asts: Granger, Sikma 9 PIR: Sikma 18	Arena: Megasport Arena; Attendance: 3,087; Referees: Carmelo Paternicò, Tomislav Hordov, Stanislav Valeev

16 October 2020	Fenerbahçe Beko (Turkey)	71–75	(Germany) Bayern Munich	Istanbul
19:45 (CET)	Scoring by quarter: 28–9, 17–16, 13–23, 13–27
	Pts: Veselý 25; Rebs: Veselý 8 Asts: De Colo 7 PIR: Veselý 33	Boxscore	Pts: Lučić 18; Rebs: Reynolds 8 Asts: Šiško 4 PIR: Lučić 24	Arena: Ülker Sports and Event Hall; Attendance: 330; Referees: Ilija Belošević, Sašo Petek, Vasiliki Tsaroucha

16 October 2020	Olympiacos (Greece)	85–82	(Israel) Maccabi Tel Aviv	Piraeus
20:00 (CET)	Scoring by quarter: 15–22, 29–18, 25–26, 16–16
	Pts: Martin 16; Rebs: Martin 8 Asts: Papanikolaou 6 PIR: Martin 21	Boxscore	Pts: Wilbekin 18; Rebs: Hunter 7 Asts: Jones 6 PIR: Hunter 20	Arena: Peace and Friendship Stadium; Attendance: 0 Referees: Juan Carlos García, Uroš Obrknežević, Saulius Račys

16 October 2020	A|X Armani Exchange Milan (Italy)	78–70	(Spain) Real Madrid	Milan
20:45 (CET)	Scoring by quarter: 10–19, 21–23, 23–13, 24–15
	Pts: Rodríguez 25; Rebs: Shields 7 Asts: Rodríguez 7 PIR: Rodríguez 37	Boxscore	Pts: Thompkins 15; Rebs: Garuba 11; Asts: Campazzo, Thompkins 3 PIR: Thompkins 16	Arena: Mediolanum Forum; Attendance: 886; Referees: Damir Javor, Robert Vyklický, Marcin Kowalski

16 October 2020	TD Systems Baskonia (Spain)	77–60	(Russia) Khimki	Vitoria-Gasteiz
21:00 (CET)	Scoring by quarter: 15–18, 20–18, 19–11, 23–13
	Pts: Giedraitis, Polonara 20; Rebs: Polonara 10; Asts: four players 3 PIR: Giedraitis 30	Boxscore	Pts: Zaytsev 17; Rebs: Booker 12; Asts: Zaytsev 8 PIR: Zaytsev 26	Arena: Buesa Arena; Attendance: 600; Referees: Fernando Rocha, Elias Koromilas, Joseph Bissang

11 November 2020	LDLC ASVEL (France)	68–89	(Serbia) Crvena zvezda mts	Villeurbanne
20:45 (CET)	Scoring by quarter: 21–17, 17–27, 15–23, 15–22
	Pts: Freeman 14; Rebs: Fall 7 Asts: Diot; PIR: Fall 17	Boxscore	Pts: Loyd 29; Rebs: Terry 7 Asts: Walden 5 PIR: Walden 32	Arena: Astroballe; Attendance: 0 Referees: Juan Carlos Garcia, Marcin Kowalski, Sebastien Clivaz

8 December 2020	Valencia Basket (Spain)	72–85	(Russia) Zenit Saint Petersburg	Valencia
21:00 (CET)	Scoring by quarter: 12–16, 27–17, 21–32, 12–20
	Pts: Dubljević 18; Rebs: Kalinić 8 Asts: Kalinić 4 PIR: Dubljević 18	Boxscore	Pts: Hollins 20; Rebs: Rivers 8 Asts: Pangos 12; PIR: Pangos 24	Arena: La Fonteta; Attendance: 0 Referees: Sreten Radović, Spiros Gkontas, Eduard Udyanskyy

=== Round 5 ===
22 October 2020	Žalgiris (Lithuania)	82–94	(Spain) Valencia Basket	Kaunas
19:00 (CET)	Scoring by quarter: 27–22, 18–15, 12–30, 25–27
	Pts: Rubit, Grigonis 12; Rebs: Hayes 6 Asts: Lekavičius 5 PIR: Lekavičius 21	Boxscore	Pts: Marinković, Dubljević 16; Rebs: Tobey 6 Asts: Van Rossom 8 PIR: Dubljević 21	Arena: Žalgiris Arena; Attendance: 5,131; Referees: Robert Lottermoser, Rain Peerandi, Sinan İşgüder

22 October 2020	Panathinaikos OPAP (Greece)	82–68	(Turkey) Fenerbahçe Beko	Marousi
20:00 (CET)	Scoring by quarter: 22–13, 15–17, 25–26, 20–12
	Pts: Nedović 28; Rebs: Papagiannis 7 Asts: Sykes 5 PIR: Nedović 28	Boxscore	Pts: Brown 17; Rebs: Barthel 5 Asts: Brown 6 PIR: Brown 22	Arena: O.A.K.A. Attendance: 0 Referees: Borys Ryzhyk, Carlos Peruga, Amit Balak

22 October 2020	Crvena zvezda mts (Serbia)	86–84(OT)	(Russia) CSKA Moscow	Belgrade
20:45 (CET)	Scoring by quarter: 18–20, 17–23, 11–8, 27–22, Overtime: 13–11
	Pts: Loyd 31; Rebs: Loyd, Jagodić-Kuridža 6 Asts: Hall 6 PIR: Loyd 25	Boxscore	Pts: Hackett 29; Rebs: Hackett, Voigtmann 5 Asts: James 8 PIR: Hackett 39	Arena: Aleksandar Nikolić Hall; Attendance: 0 Referees: Luigi Lamonica, Juan Carlos García, Artūras Šukys

23 October 2020	Khimki (Russia)	87–89(OT)	(Israel) Maccabi Tel Aviv	Khimki
19:00 (CET)	Scoring by quarter: 18–16, 15–20, 22–22, 26–23, Overtime: 6–8
	Pts: Shved 32; Rebs: Booker 12; Asts: Shved 11; PIR: Shved 28	Boxscore	Pts: Dorsey 26; Rebs: Caloiaro 10; Asts: Wilbekin 6 PIR: Caloiaro 24	Arena: Mytishchi Arena; Attendance: 0 Referees: Ilija Belošević, Emin Moğulkoç, Miloš Koljenšić

23 October 2020	Bayern Munich (Germany)	74–68	(Greece) Olympiacos	Munich
20:30 (CET)	Scoring by quarter: 22–18, 17–16, 22–19, 13–15
	Pts: Baldwin 18; Rebs: Reynolds 5 Asts: Lučić, Radošević 3 PIR: Lučić 22	Boxscore	Pts: Papanikolaou 13; Rebs: Vezenkov, Martin 5 Asts: Sloukas 4 PIR: Papanikolaou 14	Arena: Audi Dome; Attendance: 0 Referees: Matej Boltauzer, Jordi Aliaga, Marko Juras

23 October 2020	Barcelona (Spain)	79–72	(Spain) Real Madrid	Barcelona
21:00 (CET)	Scoring by quarter: 18–14, 30–13, 16–25, 15–20
	Pts: Kuric 15; Rebs: Martínez 9 Asts: Calathes 7 PIR: Davies 21	Boxscore	Pts: Thompkins 14; Rebs: Thompkins 7 Asts: Campazzo 6 PIR: Thompkins 23	Arena: Palau Blaugrana; Attendance: 0 Referees: Christos Christodoulou, Mehdi Diffalah, Milan Nedović

8 December 2020	Anadolu Efes (Turkey)	72–68	(France) LDLC ASVEL	Istanbul
18:30 (CET)	Scoring by quarter: 13–19, 20–8, 15–17, 24–24
	Pts: Micić 22; Rebs: Moerman 7 Asts: Larkin 3 PIR: Larkin 25	Boxscore	Pts: Lighty, Howard 14; Rebs: Hayes 8 Asts: Diot 7 PIR: Lighty 17	Arena: Sinan Erdem Dome; Attendance: 0 Referees: Matej Boltauzer, Emilio Pérez, Josip Radojković

5 January 2021	ALBA Berlin (Germany)	95–91	(Spain) TD Systems Baskonia	Berlin
19:00 (CET)	Scoring by quarter: 25–19, 20–25, 29–28, 21–19
	Pts: Granger 21; Rebs: Thiemann 5 Asts: Granger 6 PIR: Granger 22	Boxscore	Pts: Polonara 18; Rebs: Polonara 10; Asts: Henry 9 PIR: Dragić 24	Arena: Mercedes-Benz Arena; Attendance: 0 Referees: Jakub Zamojski, Rain Peerandi, Saulius Racys

22 February 2021	Zenit Saint Petersburg (Russia)	79–70	(Italy) A|X Armani Exchange Milan	Saint Petersburg
18:00 (CET)	Scoring by quarter: 19–15, 21–23, 14–16, 25–16
	Pts: Gudaitis, Pangos 16; Rebs: Ponitka 7 Asts: Pangos 10; PIR: Pangos 25	Boxscore	Pts: Punter 16; Rebs: Hines 10; Asts: Rodríguez 5 PIR: Shields 19	Arena: Sibur Arena; Attendance: 3,070; Referees: Daniel Hierrenzuelo, Matej Boltauzer, Elias Koromilas

=== Round 6 ===
29 October 2020	LDLC ASVEL (France)	74–83	(Lithuania) Žalgiris	Villeurbanne
18:00 (CET)	Scoring by quarter: 23–13, 27–28, 10–16, 14–26
	Pts: Kahudi 18; Rebs: Fall 8 Asts: three players 4 PIR: Fall 27	Boxscore	Pts: Grigonis 25; Rebs: Walkup 7 Asts: Walkup 7 PIR: Grigonis 27	Arena: Astroballe; Attendance: 970; Referees: Christos Christodoulou, Jordi Aliaga, Marcin Kowalski

29 October 2020	CSKA Moscow (Russia)	84–75	(Spain) Valencia Basket	Moscow
18:00 (CET)	Scoring by quarter: 17–16, 27–19, 18–23, 22–17
	Pts: James 17; Rebs: Milutinov 8 Asts: James 5 PIR: James 19	Boxscore	Pts: Kalinić 15; Rebs: Williams 6 Asts: Van Rossom 5 PIR: Labeyrie 17	Arena: Megasport Arena; Attendance: 3,125; Referees: Oļegs Latiševs, Emin Moğulkoç, Spiros Gkontas

29 October 2020	Maccabi Tel Aviv (Israel)	65–75	(Turkey) Fenerbahçe Beko	Tel Aviv
20:05 (CET)	Scoring by quarter: 22–18, 16–17, 16–21, 11–19
	Pts: Wilbekin 23; Rebs: Žižić 10; Asts: Bryant 4 PIR: Wilbekin 18	Boxscore	Pts: Muhammed 17; Rebs: three players 4 Asts: Veselý 4 PIR: Muhammed, Veselý 15	Arena: Menora Mivtachim Arena; Attendance: 0 Referees: Ilija Belošević, Carmelo Paternicò, Mehdi Diffalah

29 October 2020	Real Madrid (Spain)	100–82	(Germany) Bayern Munich	Madrid
21:00 (CET)	Scoring by quarter: 27–17, 22–28, 21–16, 30–21
	Pts: Carroll 19; Rebs: Thompkins 7 Asts: Campazzo, Laprovíttola 6 PIR: Carroll, Randolph 20	Boxscore	Pts: Baldwin 18; Rebs: Reynolds 7 Asts: Baldwin 4 PIR: Reynolds 17	Arena: WiZink Center; Attendance: 0 Referees: Luigi Lamonica, Gytis Vilius, Uroš Obrknežević

30 October 2020	Khimki (Russia)	83–77	(Serbia) Crvena zvezda mts	Khimki
18:00 (CET)	Scoring by quarter: 19–22, 25–18, 14–17, 25–20
	Pts: McCollum 23; Rebs: Mickey 11; Asts: Shved 12; PIR: McCollum 25	Boxscore	Pts: Loyd 18; Rebs: Loyd 7 Asts: three players 3 PIR: Loyd 21	Arena: Mytishchi Arena; Attendance: 0 Referees: Sreten Radović, Piotr Pastusiak, Robert Vyklický

30 October 2020	Olympiacos (Greece)	79–84	(Turkey) Anadolu Efes	Piraeus
20:00 (CET)	Scoring by quarter: 26–29, 12–15, 19–19, 22–21
	Pts: Martin 11; Rebs: Martin 6 Asts: Sloukas 7 PIR: Martin 19	Boxscore	Pts: Micić 20; Rebs: three players 5 Asts: Micić 7 PIR: Dunston, Micić 15	Arena: Peace and Friendship Stadium; Attendance: 0 Referees: Borys Ryzhyk, Fernando Rocha, Amit Balak

30 October 2020	TD Systems Baskonia (Spain)	71–72	(Spain) Barcelona	Vitoria-Gasteiz
20:30 (CET)	Scoring by quarter: 19–20, 18–19, 19–19, 15–14
	Pts: Dragić 15; Rebs: Henry 8 Asts: Henry 7 PIR: Polonara 20	Boxscore	Pts: Mirotić 18; Rebs: Mirotić, Oriola 7 Asts: Calathes 6 PIR: Mirotić 27	Arena: Buesa Arena; Attendance: 0 Referees: Luigi Lamonica, Uroš Nikolić, Sašo Petek

1 December 2020	A|X Armani Exchange Milan (Italy)	75–55	(Germany) ALBA Berlin	Milan
20:45 (CET)	Scoring by quarter: 19–13, 23–9, 22–19, 11–14
	Pts: Punter 14; Rebs: Tarczewski 6 Asts: Rodríguez 5 PIR: Punter, Rodríguez 18	Boxscore	Pts: Lô, Peyton Siva 11; Rebs: Sikma 9 Asts: Sikma 5 PIR: Sikma 16	Arena: Mediolanum Forum; Attendance: 0 Referees: Matej Boltauzer, Piotr Pastusiak, Carlos Cortés

12 April 2021	Zenit Saint Petersburg (Russia)	112–83	(Greece) Panathinaikos OPAP	Saint Petersburg
19:00 (CET)	Scoring by quarter: 26–22, 21–18, 29–20, 36–23
	Pts: Pangos 33; Rebs: Ponitka 8 Asts: Pangos 11; PIR: Pangos 41	Boxscore	Pts: Nedović 20; Rebs: White 6 Asts: Sant-Roos 5 PIR: Nedovic 20	Arena: Sibur Arena; Attendance: 3,021; Referees: Damir Javor, Piotr Pastusiak, Robert Vyklický

=== Round 7 ===
5 November 2020	Zenit Saint Petersburg (Russia)	66–75	(Greece) Olympiacos	Saint Petersburg
18:00 (CET)	Scoring by quarter: 20–19, 7–22, 16–17, 23–17
	Pts: Baron 13; Rebs: Thomas 7 Asts: Pangos 7 PIR: Baron 14	Boxscore	Pts: Martin 16; Rebs: Jean-Charles 5 Asts: Spanuolis 5 PIR: Martin 15	Arena: Sibur Arena; Attendance: 2315; Referees: Luigi Lamonica, Oļegs Latiševs, Marcin Kowalski

5 November 2020	Anadolu Efes (Turkey)	91–89	(Israel) Maccabi Tel Aviv	Istanbul
18:30 (CET)	Scoring by quarter: 22–24, 27–26, 18–22, 24–17
	Pts: Beaubois 23; Rebs: Pleiss 9 Asts: Beaubois 7 PIR: Beaubois 36	Boxscore	Pts: Bryant 22; Rebs: Zizic 8 Asts: three players 4 PIR: Bryant 25	Arena: Sinan Erdem Dome; Attendance: 0 Referees: Miguel Angel Perez, Matej Boltauzer, Gytis Vilius

5 November 2020	ALBA Berlin (Germany)	67–103	(Spain) Barcelona	Berlin
20:00 (CET)	Scoring by quarter: 18–30, 18–26, 15–23, 16–24
	Pts: Fontecchio 17; Rebs: Sikma 6 Asts: Sikma 6 PIR: Sikma 18	Boxscore	Pts: Mirotic 18; Rebs: Smits 8 Asts: Calathes 12; PIR: Mirotic 25	Arena: Mercedes-Benz Arena; Attendance: 0 Referees: Ilija Belošević, Emin Mogulkoc, Petri Mantyla

5 November 2020	TD Systems Baskonia (Spain)	86–88	(France) LDLC ASVEL	Vitoria-Gasteiz
21:00 (CET)	Scoring by quarter: 20–26, 23–17, 18–23, 25–22
	Pts: Jekiri 21; Rebs: Polonara 10; Asts: Henry 6 PIR: Jekiri, Henry 31	Boxscore	Pts: Fall 19; Rebs: Kahudi 6 Asts: Diot 7 PIR: Fall 28	Arena: Buesa Arena; Attendance: 0 Referees: Robert Lottermoser, Spiros Gkontas, Mario Majkic

6 November 2020	Fenerbahçe Beko (Turkey)	83–71	(Russia) Khimki	Istanbul
18:45 (CET)	Scoring by quarter: 23–20, 19–15, 23–20, 18–16
	Pts: Pierre, Eddie 16; Rebs: Veselý 11; Asts: Brown 8 PIR: Brown 20	Boxscore	Pts: Mickey 19; Rebs: Monroe 8 Asts: Shved 9 PIR: Mickey 21	Arena: Ülker Sports and Event Hall; Attendance: 300; Referees: Juan Carlos Garcia, Saso Petek, Uros Nikolic

6 November 2020	Žalgiris (Lithuania)	90–93	(Spain) Real Madrid	Kaunas
19:00 (CET)	Scoring by quarter: 24–32, 30–16, 19–19, 17–26
	Pts: Walkup 18; Rebs: Walkup 7 Asts: Walkup 9 PIR: Walkup 29	Boxscore	Pts: Tavares 22; Rebs: Tavares 12; Asts: Campazzo 10; PIR: Tavares 34	Arena: Žalgiris Arena; Attendance: 239; Referees: Sasa Pukl, Joseph Bissang, Anne Panther

6 November 2020	Bayern Munich (Germany)	74–59	(Serbia) Crvena zvezda mts	Munich
20:30 (CET)	Scoring by quarter: 18–14, 15–17, 22–20, 19–8
	Pts: Weiler–Babb, Baldwin IV 15; Rebs: Reynolds 11; Asts: Sisko 5 PIR: Lučić 17	Boxscore	Pts: O'Bryant 17; Rebs: Terry 6 Asts: Loyd 3 PIR: Walden 16	Arena: Audi Dome; Attendance: 0 Referees: Petri Mantyla, Emilio Perez, Tomasz Trawicki

6 November 2020	Panathinaikos OPAP (Greece)	83–89	(Russia) CSKA Moscow	Marousi
20:30 (CET)	Scoring by quarter: 24–24, 18–27, 16–14, 25–24
	Pts: Nedović 19; Rebs: Papapetrou, Papagiannis 7 Asts: Nedović, Sant-Roos 4 PIR: Nedović 23	Boxscore	Pts: Clyburn 15; Rebs: Clyburn 7 Asts: James 5 PIR: Clyburn 20	Arena: O.A.K.A. Attendance: 0 Referees: Sreten Radovic, Carmelo Paternico, Seffi Shemmesh

6 November 2020	Valencia Basket (Spain)	86–81	(Italy) A|X Armani Exchange Milan	Valencia
21:00 (CET)	Scoring by quarter: 24–18, 18–26, 24–17, 20–20
	Pts: Van Rossom 21; Rebs: Dubljević 7 Asts: Prepelič 5 PIR: Van Rossom 19	Boxscore	Pts: Shields 17; Rebs: Hines 7 Asts: Rodriguez 4 PIR: LeDay 20	Arena: La Fonteta; Attendance: 390; Referees: Christos Christodoulou, Damir Javor, Robert Lottermoser

=== Round 8 ===
12 November 2020	CSKA Moscow (Russia)	89–86	(Spain) TD Systems Baskonia	Moscow
18:00 (CET)	Scoring by quarter: 23–16, 24–19, 19–23, 23–28
	Pts: Hilliard 31; Rebs: Shengelia 7 Asts: Shengelia 4 PIR: Hilliard 32	Boxscore	Pts: Fall 19; Rebs: Fall 8 Asts: Henry 5 PIR: Fall 27	Arena: Megasport Arena; Attendance: 2745; Referees: Matej Boltauzer, Jakub Zamojski, Eduard Udyanskyy

12 November 2020	Olympiacos (Greece)	75–71	(Germany) ALBA Berlin	Piraeus
20:00 (CET)	Scoring by quarter: 10–22, 14–13, 27–9, 24–27
	Pts: McKissic 14; Rebs: Martin, Papanikolaou 6 Asts: Spanoulis 6 PIR: Papanikolaou 14	Boxscore	Pts: Giffey 13; Rebs: Giffey 6 Asts: Granger 5 PIR: Giffey 21	Arena: Peace and Friendship Stadium; Attendance: 0 Referees: Daniel Hierrezuelo, Damir Javor, Milos Koljensic

12 November 2020	Maccabi Tel Aviv (Israel)	85–57	(Lithuania) Žalgiris	Tel Aviv
20:05 (CET)	Scoring by quarter: 24–14, 29–9, 19–21, 13–13
	Pts: Dorsey 16; Rebs: Žižić 8 Asts: Dorsey 4 PIR: Dorsey 21	Boxscore	Pts: Walkup 12; Rebs: Walkup, Jankūnas 6 Asts: Lauvergne 3 PIR: Lauvergne 14	Arena: Menora Mivtachim Arena; Attendance: 0 Referees: Robert Lottermoser, Carlos Peruga, Igor Dragojević

12 November 2020	Barcelona (Spain)	97–55	(Turkey) Fenerbahçe Beko	Barcelona
21:00 (CET)	Scoring by quarter: 28–17, 23–12, 18–9, 28–17
	Pts: Kuric 25; Rebs: Mirotić 8 Asts: Heurtel, Calathes 8 PIR: Šmits, Mirotić 23	Boxscore	Pts: Brown 10; Rebs: Duverioglu 4 Asts: Westermann 5 PIR: Brown 10	Arena: Palau Blaugrana; Attendance: 0 Referees: Olegs Latisevs, Tomislav Hordov, Tomasz Trawicki

13 November 2020	Crvena zvezda mts (Serbia)	67–73	(Spain) Real Madrid	Belgrade
19:00 (CET)	Scoring by quarter: 26–21, 16–15, 11–23, 14–14
	Pts: Loyd 22; Rebs: O'Bryant III 8 Asts: three players 3 PIR: Loyd 20	Boxscore	Pts: Thompkins 14; Rebs: three players 6 Asts: Abalde 6 PIR: Randolph 16	Arena: Štark Arena; Attendance: 0 Referees: Christos Christodoulou, Emin Mogulkoc, Amit Balak

13 November 2020	Panathinaikos OPAP (Greece)	77–80	(Turkey) Anadolu Efes	Marousi
20:00 (CET)	Scoring by quarter: 22–21, 18–15, 14–23, 23–21
	Pts: Mack 18; Rebs: Mitoglou, White 8 Asts: Sant-Roos 6 PIR: Papagiannis 22	Boxscore	Pts: Micić 33; Rebs: Singleton 9 Asts: Balbay 4 PIR: Micić 29	Arena: O.A.K.A. Attendance: 0 Referees: Daniel Hierrenzuelo, Milivoje Jovcic, Milan Nedovic

13 November 2020	Bayern Munich (Germany)	90–79	(Spain) Valencia Basket	Munich
20:30 (CET)	Scoring by quarter: 21–18, 16–21, 25–21, 28–19
	Pts: Lučić 22; Rebs: Johnson 8 Asts: Šiško 5 PIR: Lučić 35	Boxscore	Pts: Prepelič 18; Rebs: Dubljević 6 Asts: Prepelič, Vives 5 PIR: Prepelič 18	Arena: Audi Dome; Attendance: 0 Referees: Sasa Pukl, Elias Koromilas, Hugues Thepenier

13 November 2020	LDLC ASVEL (France)	53–66	(Russia) Zenit Saint Petersburg	Villeurbanne
20:45 (CET)	Scoring by quarter: 11–12, 10–16, 16–16, 16–22
	Pts: Kahudi 14; Rebs: Fall 7 Asts: Diot 5 PIR: Fall 13	Boxscore	Pts: Thomas 14; Rebs: Poythress, Thomas 7 Asts: Pangos 4 PIR: Thomas 24	Arena: Astroballe; Attendance: 0 Referees: Miguel Angel Perez, Anne Panther, Carmelo Paternico

8 December 2020	Khimki (Russia)	93–102	(Italy) A|X Armani Exchange Milan	Khimki
16:30 (CET)	Scoring by quarter: 20–28, 27–26, 21–18, 25–30
	Pts: Jerebko 20; Rebs: Jerebko 7 Asts: Shved 13; PIR: McCollum 25	Boxscore	Pts: Shields 26; Rebs: Punter 5 Asts: Delaney 7 PIR: Shields 34	Arena: Mytishchi Arena; Attendance: 0 Referees: Daniel Hierrezuelo, Mehdi Difallah, Tomislav Hordov

=== Round 9 ===
17 November 2020	Zenit Saint Petersburg (Russia)	83–88	(Russia) Khimki	Saint Petersburg
18:00 (CET)	Scoring by quarter: 27–19, 20–25, 20–19, 16–25
	Pts: Baron 24; Rebs: Gudaitis, Ponitka 9 Asts: Pangos 10; PIR: Baron 21	Boxscore	Pts: Shved 24; Rebs: Monroe 9 Asts: Timma 4 PIR: McCollum 23	Arena: Sibur Arena; Attendance: 2,193; Referees: Damir Javor, Emin Moğulkoç, Milivoje Jovčić

17 November 2020	Anadolu Efes (Turkey)	71–74	(Germany) Bayern Munich	Istanbul
18:30 (CET)	Scoring by quarter: 23–22, 14–20, 20–8, 14–24
	Pts: Pleiss 19; Rebs: Moerman 9 Asts: Larkin 7 PIR: Pleiss 23	Boxscore	Pts: Baldwin IV 15; Rebs: Lučić 9 Asts: Baldwin IV 11; PIR: Reynolds 21	Arena: Sinan Erdem Dome; Attendance: 0 Referees: Juan Carlos García, Sašo Petek, Artem Lavrukhin

17 November 2020	Žalgiris (Lithuania)	78–87	(Russia) CSKA Moscow	Kaunas
19:00 (CET)	Scoring by quarter: 17–26, 21–19, 20–21, 20–21
	Pts: Grigonis 19; Rebs: Jankūnas 6 Asts: Walkup 7 PIR: Grigonis 24	Boxscore	Pts: Mike James 27; Rebs: Milutinov 7 Asts: Mike James 5 PIR: Mike James 32	Arena: Žalgiris Arena; Attendance: 0 Referees: Ilija Belošević, Carlos Cortés, Ioannis Foufis

17 November 2020	TD Systems Baskonia (Spain)	86–68	(Turkey) Fenerbahçe Beko	Vitoria-Gasteiz
21:00 (CET)	Scoring by quarter: 20–21, 25–15, 19–23, 22–9
	Pts: Peters 25; Rebs: Jekiri 8 Asts: Henry 10; PIR: Peters 31	Boxscore	Pts: Veselý 15; Rebs: Brown, Eddie 4 Asts: Brown 5 PIR: Veselý 18	Arena: Buesa Arena; Attendance: 0 Referees: Luigi Lamonica, Mehdi Difallah, Gytis Vilius

17 November 2020	Valencia Basket (Spain)	95–83	(Greece) Panathinaikos OPAP	Valencia
21:00 (CET)	Scoring by quarter: 22–21, 23–20, 25–25, 25–17
	Pts: Prepelič 18; Rebs: Labeyrie 4 Asts: Dubljević, Prepelič 6 PIR: Prepelič 26	Boxscore	Pts: Mack 15; Rebs: Papapetrou 9 Asts: three players 4 PIR: Papapetrou 20	Arena: La Fonteta; Attendance: 0 Referees: Fernando Rocha, Tomislav Hordov, Robert Vyklický

18 November 2020	Real Madrid (Spain)	79–63	(Israel) Maccabi Tel Aviv	Madrid
18:30 (CET)	Scoring by quarter: 29–18, 16–14, 17–18, 17–13
	Pts: Deck 16; Rebs: Tavares 8 Asts: Campazzo 12; PIR: three players 21	Boxscore	Pts: Wilbekin 18; Rebs: Žižić 10; Asts: Bryant 3 PIR: Žižić 17	Arena: WiZink Center; Attendance: 0 Referees: Oļegs Latiševs, Piotr Pastusiak, Tomislav Hordov

18 November 2020	ALBA Berlin (Germany)	76–75	(France) LDLC ASVEL	Berlin
20:00 (CET)	Scoring by quarter: 19–21, 17–22, 14–17, 26–15
	Pts: Sikma 16; Rebs: Theimann 7 Asts: Granger 7 PIR: Theimann, Sikma 17	Boxscore	Pts: Fall 25; Rebs: Fall 10; Asts: Fall, Strazel 4 PIR: Fall 42	Arena: Mercedes-Benz Arena; Attendance: 0 Referees: Daniel Hierrezuelo, Uroš Nikolić, Elias Koromilas

18 November 2020	A|X Armani Exchange Milan (Italy)	79–87	(Serbia) Crvena zvezda mts	Milan
20:45 (CET)	Scoring by quarter: 23–18, 21–30, 16–18, 19–21
	Pts: Micov 13; Rebs: three players 3 Asts: Rodríguez 5 PIR: Micov 14	Boxscore	Pts: Loyd 17; Rebs: Terry 7 Asts: Loyd 5 PIR: Loyd 24	Arena: Mediolanum Forum; Attendance: 0 Referees: Matej Boltauzer, Joseph Bissang, Petri Mäntylä

8 December 2020	Barcelona (Spain)	88–96	(Greece) Olympiacos	Barcelona
19:00 (CET)	Scoring by quarter: 17–26, 30–25, 16–21, 25–24
	Pts: Mirotić 16; Rebs: Davies 6 Asts: Higgins 5 PIR: Mirotić 19	Boxscore	Pts: Martin 17; Rebs: Martin 8 Asts: Sloukas 10; PIR: Sloukas 23	Arena: Palau Blaugrana; Attendance: 0 Referees: Saša Pukl, Milivoje Jovčić, Fernando Rocha

=== Round 10 ===
19 November 2020	Khimki (Russia)	77–105	(Turkey) Anadolu Efes	Khimki
18:00 (CET)	Scoring by quarter: 30–29, 21–29, 12–28, 14–19
	Pts: Timma, Mickey 13; Rebs: Timma, Mickey 5 Asts: Shved 9 PIR: Timma, Mickey 16	Boxscore	Pts: Simon 24; Rebs: Moerman 7 Asts: Larkin 7 PIR: Simon 27	Arena: Mytishchi Arena; Attendance: 0 Referees: Christos Christodoulou, Miloš Koljenšić, Marcin Kowalski

19 November 2020	Bayern Munich (Germany)	81–89	(Russia) CSKA Moscow	Munich
20:30 (CET)	Scoring by quarter: 17–18, 22–18, 21–28, 21–25
	Pts: Baldwin IV 19; Rebs: Reynolds 8 Asts: Baldwin IV 6 PIR: Reynolds 21	Boxscore	Pts: James 25; Rebs: Milutinov 12; Asts: Hilliard 4 PIR: Milutinov 29	Arena: Audi Dome; Attendance: 0 Referees: Daniel Hierrezuelo, Uroš Nikolić, Milan Nedović

19 November 2020	TD Systems Baskonia (Spain)	93–72	(Greece) Panathinaikos OPAP	Vitoria-Gasteiz
20:30 (CET)	Scoring by quarter: 20–23, 26–16, 20–19, 27–14
	Pts: Vildoza, Peters 19; Rebs: Jekiri 10; Asts: Henry 12; PIR: Henry, Peters 25	Boxscore	Pts: Papapetrou 17; Rebs: Papagiannis 10; Asts: Sant-Roos 6 PIR: Papagiannis 16	Arena: Buesa Arena; Attendance: 0 Referees: Oļegs Latiševs, Piotr Pastusiak, Tomislav Hordov

20 November 2020	ALBA Berlin (Germany)	66–73	(Russia) Zenit Saint Petersburg	Berlin
20:00 (CET)	Scoring by quarter: 10–12, 12–21, 21–18, 23–22
	Pts: Lammers 15; Rebs: Lammers 10; Asts: Siva 8 PIR: Lammers 24	Boxscore	Pts: Thomas 17; Rebs: Poythress 6 Asts: Pangos 8 PIR: Thomas, Gudaitis 24	Arena: Mercedes-Benz Arena; Attendance: 0 Referees: Carlos Peruga, Milan Nedović, Saulius Racys

20 November 2020	A|X Armani Exchange Milan (Italy)	98–92	(Lithuania) Žalgiris	Milan
20:45 (CET)	Scoring by quarter: 21–25, 31–15, 21–24, 25–28
	Pts: Punter 22; Rebs: Hines, LeDay 6 Asts: Rodríguez 5 PIR: Punter 29	Boxscore	Pts: Lekavičius 16; Rebs: Rubit 7 Asts: Walkup 8 PIR: Rubit 22	Arena: Mediolanum Forum; Attendance: 0 Referees: Emilio Pérez, Sašo Petek, Sérgio Silva

20 November 2020	Barcelona (Spain)	76–65	(Serbia) Crvena zvezda mts	Barcelona
21:00 (CET)	Scoring by quarter: 19–6, 20–16, 22–22, 15–21
	Pts: Mirotić 23; Rebs: Oriola 5 Asts: Calathes 8 PIR: Mirotić 31	Boxscore	Pts: Davidovac 12; Rebs: Terry 6 Asts: Rochestie 5 PIR: Terry 13	Arena: Palau Blaugrana; Attendance: 0 Referees: Luigi Lamonica, Anne Panther, Vilius Gytis

20 November 2020	Real Madrid (Spain)	94–74	(Turkey) Fenerbahçe Beko	Madrid
21:00 (CET)	Scoring by quarter: 28–12, 21–24, 23–15, 22–23
	Pts: Abalde 17; Rebs: Tavares 6 Asts: Campazzo 12; PIR: Abalde 22	Boxscore	Pts: Barthel 22; Rebs: Brown 6 Asts: Brown 5 PIR: Barthel 23	Arena: WiZink Center; Attendance: 0 Referees: Matej Boltauzer, Fernando Rocha, Joseph Bissang

20 November 2020	Valencia Basket (Spain)	82–80	(Israel) Maccabi Tel Aviv	Valencia
21:00 (CET)	Scoring by quarter: 19–17, 24–20, 15–22, 24–21
	Pts: Prepelič 22; Rebs: Williams 6 Asts: Dubljević 7 PIR: Prepelič 24	Boxscore	Pts: Wilbekin 25; Rebs: Bender, Caloiaro 7 Asts: Wilbekin 5 PIR: Wilbekin 24	Arena: La Fonteta; Attendance: 0 Referees: Milivoje Jovčić, Carmelo Paternicò, Tomasz Trawicki

19 January 2021	LDLC ASVEL (France)	93–101(OT)	(Greece) Olympiacos	Villeurbanne
20:45 (CET)	Scoring by quarter: 15–23, 22–21, 24–19, 25–23, Overtime: 7–15
	Pts: Cole 21; Rebs: Hayes 8 Asts: Cole 6 PIR: Lighty 19	Boxscore	Pts: McKissic, Sloukas 23; Rebs: Jenkins, Martin 6 Asts: Sloukas 6 PIR: Sloukas 27	Arena: Astroballe; Attendance: 0 Referees: Matej Boltauzer, Emilio Perez, Tomasz Trawicki

=== Round 11 ===
26 November 2020	CSKA Moscow (Russia)	74–73	(Spain) Real Madrid	Moscow
18:00 (CET)	Scoring by quarter: 17–20, 18–18, 23–17, 16–18
	Pts: James 28; Rebs: Clyburn, Milutinov 9 Asts: Clyburn 2 PIR: James 24	Boxscore	Pts: Thompkins 15; Rebs: Tavares 10; Asts: Llull 6 PIR: Tavares 25	Arena: Megasport Arena; Attendance: 3103; Referees: Luigi Lamonica, Sašo Petek, Gytis Vilius

26 November 2020	Crvena zvezda mts (Serbia)	64–75	(Turkey) Anadolu Efes	Belgrade
19:00 (CET)	Scoring by quarter: 14–16, 22–24, 14–27, 14–8
	Pts: Walden 14; Rebs: Kuzmić 8 Asts: Loyd 4 PIR: Walden, Kuzmić 14	Boxscore	Pts: Larkin 18; Rebs: Moerman 9 Asts: Larkin 5 PIR: Moerman 27	Arena: Štark Arena; Attendance: 0 Referees: Miguel Ángel Pérez, Spiros Gkontas, Amit Balak

26 November 2020	Žalgiris (Lithuania)	75–83	(Russia) Zenit Saint Petersburg	Kaunas
19:00 (CET)	Scoring by quarter: 15–23, 17–22, 19–21, 24–17
	Pts: Grigonis 18; Rebs: Lauvergne 8 Asts: Walkup 4 PIR: Grigonis 22	Boxscore	Pts: Hollins 20; Rebs: Thomas 7 Asts: Pangos 7 PIR: Hollins 19	Arena: Žalgiris Arena; Attendance: 0 Referees: Matej Boltauzer, Oļegs Latiševs, Anne Panther

26 November 2020	ALBA Berlin (Germany)	100–80	(Russia) Khimki	Berlin
20:00 (CET)	Scoring by quarter: 20–24, 30–20, 27–18, 23–18
	Pts: Giffey 22; Rebs: Sikma 9 Asts: Siva 10; PIR: Sikma 32	Boxscore	Pts: Jerebko 20; Rebs: Jerebko 8 Asts: Shved 10; PIR: Jerebko 27	Arena: Mercedes-Benz Arena; Attendance: 0 Referees: Carmelo Paternicò, Emilio Pérez, Jakub Zamojski

26 November 2020	Olympiacos (Greece)	76–90	(Spain) TD Systems Baskonia	Piraeus
20:00 (CET)	Scoring by quarter: 15–23, 16–24, 27–20, 18–23
	Pts: Sloukas, Printezis 15; Rebs: Martin 8 Asts: Sloukas, McKissic 3 PIR: Martin 19	Boxscore	Pts: Dragić 18; Rebs: Fall 7 Asts: Henry 11; PIR: Henry 24	Arena: Peace and Friendship Stadium; Attendance: 0 Referees: Ilija Belošević, Sreten Radović, Joseph Bissang

26 November 2020	Maccabi Tel Aviv (Israel)	85–86(OT)	(Italy) A|X Armani Exchange Milan	Tel Aviv
20:05 (CET)	Scoring by quarter: 20–18, 15–28, 18–13, 17–11, Overtime: 15–16
	Pts: Bryant, Wilbekin 17; Rebs: Bryant 9 Asts: Wilbekin 6 PIR: Bryant 25	Boxscore	Pts: Punter 18; Rebs: Shields 11; Asts: Rodríguez 5 PIR: Punter 20	Arena: Menora Mivtachim Arena; Attendance: 0 Referees: Juan Carlos García, Damir Javor, Mehdi Difallah

27 November 2020	Fenerbahçe Beko (Turkey)	86–90	(Spain) Valencia Basket	Istanbul
18:45 (CET)	Scoring by quarter: 17–16, 26-17, 21–26, 22–31
	Pts: Pierre 18; Rebs: Barthel 6 Asts: Brown, Muhammed 5 PIR: Pierre 25	Boxscore	Pts: Van Rossom 20; Rebs: Dubljević 8 Asts: Van Rossom 5 PIR: Van Rossom 24	Arena: Ülker Sports and Event Hall; Attendance: 0 Referees: Saša Pukl, Elias Koromilas, Piotr Pastusiak

27 November 2020	Panathinaikos OPAP (Greece)	83–76	(Germany) Bayern Munich	Marousi
20:00 (CET)	Scoring by quarter: 18–13, 26–22, 16–19, 23–20
	Pts: Nedović 17; Rebs: Sant-Roos 7 Asts: Nedović 6 PIR: Nedović 24	Boxscore	Pts: Lučić 20; Rebs: Zipser 7 Asts: Baldwin IV 3 PIR: Lučić 26	Arena: O.A.K.A. Attendance: 0 Referees: Carlos Peruga, Milivoje Jovčić, Josip Radojković

27 November 2020	LDLC ASVEL (France)	80–68	(Spain) Barcelona	Villeurbanne
20:45 (CET)	Scoring by quarter: 25–19, 20–17, 20–17, 15–15
	Pts: Lighty 17; Rebs: four players 4 Asts: Cole 4 PIR: Lighty 23	Boxscore	Pts: Mirotić 14; Rebs: Mirotić 9 Asts: Davies 4 PIR: Mirotić 24	Arena: Astroballe; Attendance: 0 Referees: Robert Lottermoser, Fernando Rocha, Eduard Udyanskyy

=== Round 12 ===
3 December 2020	CSKA Moscow (Russia)	80–61	(Greece) Olympiacos	Moscow
18:00 (CET)	Scoring by quarter: 20–19, 19–10, 17–9, 24–23
	Pts: James 16; Rebs: Milutinov 8 Asts: James 7 PIR: James 20	Boxscore	Pts: Martin, Printezis 10; Rebs: Jean-Charles 5 Asts: Spanoulis 7 PIR: McKissic 13	Arena: Megasport Arena; Attendance: 2611; Referees: Juan Carlos García, Oļegs Latiševs, Mehdi Difallah

3 December 2020	Zenit Saint Petersburg (Russia)	65–73	(Turkey) Fenerbahçe Beko	Saint Petersburg
18:00 (CET)	Scoring by quarter: 14–23, 18–22, 21–8, 12–20
	Pts: Pangos 16; Rebs: Ponitka 8 Asts: Pangos 4 PIR: Pangos 22	Boxscore	Pts: Veselý 17; Rebs: Barthel 5 Asts: Brown 5 PIR: Barthel 24	Arena: Sibur Arena; Attendance: 1317; Referees: Carmelo Paternicò, Joseph Bissang, Uroš Nikolić

3 December 2020	Maccabi Tel Aviv (Israel)	81–76	(Serbia) Crvena zvezda mts	Tel Aviv
20:05 (CET)	Scoring by quarter: 23–20, 18–18, 15–17, 25–21
	Pts: Wilbekin 23; Rebs: Hunter 10; Asts: Jones 5 PIR: Wilbekin 26	Boxscore	Pts: Loyd 24; Rebs: O'Bryant 8 Asts: Loyd 5 PIR: Loyd 25	Arena: Menora Mivtachim Arena; Attendance: 0 Referees: Daniel Hierrezuelo, Fernando Rocha, Artem Lavrukhin

3 December 2020	A|X Armani Exchange Milan (Italy)	77–80	(Greece) Panathinaikos OPAP	Milan
20:45 (CET)	Scoring by quarter: 22–18, 20–12, 18–24, 17–26
	Pts: Punter 16; Rebs: LeDay 5 Asts: Delaney 3 PIR: Delaney 16	Boxscore	Pts: Nedović 16; Rebs: White 10; Asts: Mack 5 PIR: Mitoglou 21	Arena: Mediolanum Forum; Attendance: 0 Referees: Miguel Ángel Pérez, Sreten Radović, Milan Nedović

3 December 2020	Valencia Basket (Spain)	92–100	(Germany) ALBA Berlin	Valencia
21:00 (CET)	Scoring by quarter: 21–27, 29–24, 15–32, 27–17
	Pts: Prepelič, Hermannsson 13; Rebs: Pradilla 7 Asts: Hermannsson 6 PIR: Hermannsson 18	Boxscore	Pts: Granger 17; Rebs: Sikma 12; Asts: Siva 10; PIR: Sikma 24	Arena: La Fonteta; Attendance: 0 Referees: Luigi Lamonica, Damir Javor, Igor Dragojević

4 December 2020	Anadolu Efes (Turkey)	59–77	(Spain) TD Systems Baskonia	Istanbul
18:30 (CET)	Scoring by quarter: 20–17, 17–25, 13–21, 9–14
	Pts: Larkin 8 Rebs: Singleton 6 Asts: Larkin 5 PIR: Singleton 9	Boxscore	Pts: Peters 18; Rebs: Jekiri 8 Asts: Giedraitis 6 PIR: Peters 20	Arena: Sinan Erdem Dome; Attendance: 0 Referees: Robert Lottermoser, Milivoje Jovčić, Sašo Petek

4 December 2020	Žalgiris (Lithuania)	62–73	(Spain) Barcelona	Kaunas
19:00 (CET)	Scoring by quarter: 14–17, 19–22, 15–16, 14–18
	Pts: Jokubaitis 15; Rebs: Hayes 6 Asts: Walkup, Hayes 4 PIR: Hayes 18	Boxscore	Pts: Davies 16; Rebs: Calathes 5 Asts: Calathes 10; PIR: Davies 22	Arena: Žalgiris Arena; Attendance: 0 Referees: Saša Pukl, Tomislav Hordov, Michele Rossi

4 December 2020	Bayern Munich (Germany)	80–77	(Russia) Khimki	Munich
20:30 (CET)	Scoring by quarter: 15–22, 28–18, 21–24, 16–13
	Pts: Baldwin 19; Rebs: Reynolds 9 Asts: Baldwin 5 PIR: Zipser 22	Boxscore	Pts: Shved 20; Rebs: Mickey 10; Asts: Shved 9 PIR: Shved 23	Arena: Audi Dome; Attendance: 0 Referees: Matej Boltauzer, Piotr Pastusiak, Carlos Cortés

4 December 2020	Real Madrid (Spain)	91–84	(France) LDLC ASVEL	Madrid
21:00 (CET)	Scoring by quarter: 19–26, 21–24, 21–20, 30–14
	Pts: Tavares, Llull 19; Rebs: Tavares 6 Asts: Laprovíttola 5 PIR: Tavares 29	Boxscore	Pts: Yabusele, Cole 21; Rebs: Yabusele 7 Asts: Cole 4 PIR: Cole 20	Arena: WiZink Center; Attendance: 0 Referees: Ilija Belošević, Mario Majkić, Gentian Cici

=== Round 13 ===
10 December 2020	Crvena zvezda mts (Serbia)	79–81	(Greece) Olympiacos	Belgrade
19:00 (CET)	Scoring by quarter: 30–16, 15–21, 16–25, 18–19
	Pts: O'Bryant 16; Rebs: four players 4 Asts: Loyd 5 PIR: Loyd 16	Boxscore	Pts: Printezis 16; Rebs: Martin 6 Asts: Sloukas 7 PIR: Printezis 18	Arena: Aleksandar Nikolić Hall; Attendance: 0 Referees: Damir Javor, Carmelo Paternicò, Jordi Aliaga

10 December 2020	ALBA Berlin (Germany)	89–63	(Turkey) Fenerbahçe Beko	Berlin
20:00 (CET)	Scoring by quarter: 23–16, 21–11, 26–14, 19–22
	Pts: Giffey 13; Rebs: Sikma 8 Asts: Giffey 8 PIR: Giffey 20	Boxscore	Pts: Biberovic 13; Rebs: Hamilton 5 Asts: Westermann 4 PIR: Westermann 12	Arena: Mercedes-Benz Arena; Attendance: 0 Referees: Juan Carlos García, Sašo Petek, Seffi Shemmesh

10 December 2020	TD Systems Baskonia (Spain)	63–67	(Israel) Maccabi Tel Aviv	Vitoria-Gasteiz
21:00 (CET)	Scoring by quarter: 20–12, 13–25, 21–19, 9–11
	Pts: Polonara 15; Rebs: Polonara 8 Asts: Polonara 6 PIR: Polonara 28	Boxscore	Pts: Dorsey 15; Rebs: Hunter, Dorsey 5 Asts: Wilbekin, Jones 4 PIR: Hunter 18	Arena: Buesa Arena; Attendance: 0 Referees: Luigi Lamonica, Spiros Gkontas, Josip Radojković

10 December 2020	Valencia Basket (Spain)	76–74	(Turkey) Anadolu Efes	Valencia
21:00 (CET)	Scoring by quarter: 19–23, 21–15, 14–22, 22–14
	Pts: Tobey 21; Rebs: Dubljević 9 Asts: Hermannsson 7 PIR: Tobey 27	Boxscore	Pts: Micić, Anderson 16; Rebs: Singleton 5 Asts: Larkin 6 PIR: Singleton 23	Arena: La Fonteta; Attendance: 0 Referees: Christos Christodoulou, Tomislav Hordov, Anne Panther

10 December 2020	Real Madrid (Spain)	79–72	(Russia) Zenit Saint Petersburg	Madrid
21:00 (CET)	Scoring by quarter: 24–21, 12–10, 23–11, 20–30
	Pts: Abalde 16; Rebs: Tavares 13; Asts: Laprovittola 4 PIR: Tavares 26	Boxscore	Pts: Hollins 15; Rebs: Poythress, Ponitka 5 Asts: Ponitka 5 PIR: Hollins 15	Arena: WiZink Center; Attendance: 0 Referees: Saša Pukl, Milivoje Jovčić, Robert Vyklický

11 December 2020	Khimki (Russia)	87–96	(Russia) CSKA Moscow	Khimki
18:00 (CET)	Scoring by quarter: 22–25, 21–27, 26–25, 18–19
	Pts: Shved 26; Rebs: Monroe 8 Asts: Shved 6 PIR: Shved 22	Boxscore	Pts: James 36; Rebs: Milutinov 11; Asts: James 10; PIR: James 51	Arena: Mytishchi Arena; Attendance: 0 Referees: Miguel Ángel Pérez, Emin Moğulkoç, Hugues Thépénier

11 December 2020	Panathinaikos OPAP (Greece)	69–81	(Lithuania) Žalgiris	Marousi
20:00 (CET)	Scoring by quarter: 12–24, 21–19, 17–17, 19–21
	Pts: Nedović 12; Rebs: Papagiannis 11; Asts: three players 4 PIR: Papagiannis 20	Boxscore	Pts: Grigonis 24; Rebs: Rubit, Lauvergne 8 Asts: Walkup 8 PIR: Grigonis 24	Arena: O.A.K.A. Attendance: 0 Referees: Daniel Hierrezuelo, Fernando Rocha, Mehdi Difallah

11 December 2020	Bayern Munich (Germany)	76–62	(France) LDLC ASVEL	Munich
20:30 (CET)	Scoring by quarter: 24–15, 18–10, 18–19, 16–18
	Pts: Reynolds 17; Rebs: Reynolds 11; Asts: Seeley, Šiško 3 PIR: Reynolds 21	Boxscore	Pts: Freeman 12; Rebs: Fall 6 Asts: Freeman 4 PIR: Freeman 14	Arena: Audi Dome; Attendance: 0 Referees: Sreten Radović, Jurgis Laurinavičius, Amit Balak

11 December 2020	Barcelona (Spain)	87–71	(Italy) A|X Armani Exchange Milan	Barcelona
21:00 (CET)	Scoring by quarter: 23–15, 16–28, 21–18, 27–10
	Pts: Davies 21; Rebs: Mirotić 10; Asts: Calathes 14; PIR: Davies, Mirotić 28	Boxscore	Pts: Delaney 23; Rebs: Brooks 6 Asts: Delaney 4 PIR: Delaney 22	Arena: Palau Blaugrana; Attendance: 0 Referees: Robert Lottermoser, Oļegs Latiševs, Sašo Petek

=== Round 14 ===
15 December 2020	CSKA Moscow (Russia)	100–65	(Turkey) Anadolu Efes	Moscow
18:00 (CET)	Scoring by quarter: 20–13, 27–21, 27–15, 26–16
	Pts: Clyburn 22; Rebs: Voigtmann, Milutinov 10; Asts: James 10; PIR: Clyburn 25	Boxscore	Pts: Micić 14; Rebs: Moerman, Dunston 7 Asts: Simon 5 PIR: Dunston 17	Arena: Megasport Arena; Attendance: 2623; Referees: Saša Pukl, Carmelo Paternicò, Emilio Pérez

15 December 2020	Fenerbahçe Beko (Turkey)	71–79	(Italy) A|X Armani Exchange Milan	Istanbul
18:45 (CET)	Scoring by quarter: 25–26, 10–18, 13–24, 23–11
	Pts: Pierre 16; Rebs: Düverioğlu 6 Asts: Westermann 4 PIR: Pierre 20	Boxscore	Pts: LeDay 15; Rebs: LeDay 7 Asts: Rodríguez, Delaney 4 PIR: LeDay 20	Arena: Ülker Sports and Event Hall; Attendance: 0 Referees: Daniel Hierrezuelo, Fernando Rocha, Mario Majkić

15 December 2020	Crvena zvezda mts (Serbia)	84–90(OT)	(Germany) ALBA Berlin	Belgrade
19:00 (CET)	Scoring by quarter: 16–15, 21–19, 20–14, 19–28, Overtime: 8–14
	Pts: Loyd 21; Rebs: O'Bryant 9 Asts: Walden 5 PIR: Loyd 17	Boxscore	Pts: Lô 21; Rebs: Olinde 7 Asts: Lô, Siva 6 PIR: Siva 26	Arena: Aleksandar Nikolić Hall; Attendance: 0 Referees: Borys Ryzhyk, Carlos Peruga, Artūras Šukys

15 December 2020	Žalgiris (Lithuania)	92–73	(Spain) TD Systems Baskonia	Kaunas
19:00 (CET)	Scoring by quarter: 25–22, 19–14, 24–11, 24–26
	Pts: Milaknis 15; Rebs: Rubit 7 Asts: Jokubaitis, Grigonis 5 PIR: Lekavičius 16	Boxscore	Pts: Y.Fall 14; Rebs: Polonara 7 Asts: Henry 9 PIR: Y.Fall 19	Arena: Žalgiris Arena; Attendance: 0 Referees: Sreten Radović, Emin Moğulkoç, Amit Balak

15 December 2020	Panathinaikos OPAP (Greece)	93–97(OT)	(Spain) Real Madrid	Marousi
20:00 (CET)	Scoring by quarter: 15–14, 14–19, 19–23, 20–12, Overtime: 11–11, 14–18
	Pts: Nedović 27; Rebs: Papapetrou 7 Asts: Mack 6 PIR: Nedović 24	Boxscore	Pts: Tavares 20; Rebs: Tavares 14; Asts: Abalde 6 PIR: Tavares 36	Arena: O.A.K.A. Attendance: 0 Referees: Robert Lottermoser, Damir Javor. Uros Nikolic

16 December 2020	Zenit Saint Petersburg (Russia)	79–75	(Germany) Bayern Munich	Saint Petersburg
17:00 (CET)	Scoring by quarter: 14–20, 21–23, 21–17, 23–15
	Pts: Baron 20; Rebs: Thomas 7 Asts: Pangos 5 PIR: Thomas 25	Boxscore	Pts: Reynolds 13; Rebs: Baldwin, Reynolds 5 Asts: Sisko 6 PIR: Baldwin 20	Arena: Sibur Arena; Attendance: 0 Referees: Juan Carlos García, Ilija Belošević, Spiros Gkontas

16 December 2020	Barcelona (Spain)	87–74	(Russia) Khimki	Barcelona
19:00 (CET)	Scoring by quarter: 32–25, 19–16, 18–12, 18–21
	Pts: Mirotić 24; Rebs: Abrines, Mirotić 4 Asts: Calathes 12; PIR: Mirotić 34	Boxscore	Pts: Shved 22; Rebs: Shved 9 Asts: Shved 6 PIR: Shved 27	Arena: Palau Blaugrana; Attendance: 0 Referees: Luigi Lamonica, Mehdi Difallah, Anne Panther

16 December 2020	Olympiacos (Greece)	85–96	(Spain) Valencia Basket	Piraeus
20:00 (CET)	Scoring by quarter: 16–25, 23–27, 26–24, 20–20
	Pts: Sloukas 18; Rebs: Vezenkov, Jean-Charles 7 Asts: Sloukas 7 PIR: Vezenkov, Jean-Charles 22	Boxscore	Pts: Dubljević 20; Rebs: Dubljević 9 Asts: Prepelič 4 PIR: Dubljević 29	Arena: Peace and Friendship Stadium; Attendance: 0 Referees: Matej Boltauzer, Michele Rossi, Robert Vyklický

16 December 2020	LDLC ASVEL (France)	84–81	(Israel) Maccabi Tel Aviv	Villeurbanne
20:45 (CET)	Scoring by quarter: 30–24, 20–17, 17–23, 17–17
	Pts: M. Fall, Cole 15; Rebs: Lighty 8 Asts: Cole 4 PIR: M. Fall 25	Boxscore	Pts: Wilbekin 25; Rebs: Bryant 5 Asts: three players 3 PIR: Wilbekin 29	Arena: Astroballe; Attendance: 0 Referees: Miguel Ángel Pérez, Sašo Petek, Josip Radojković

=== Round 15 ===
17 December 2020	Anadolu Efes (Turkey)	69–72	(Italy) A|X Armani Exchange Milan	Istanbul
18:30 (CET)	Scoring by quarter: 20–20, 11–26, 21–6, 17–20
	Pts: Micić 20; Rebs: Micić, Dunston 8 Asts: Micić 5 PIR: Micić 21	Boxscore	Pts: Punter 18; Rebs: Hines 7 Asts: Rodríguez 8 PIR: Punter, Shields 15	Arena: Sinan Erdem Dome; Attendance: 0 Referees: Sreten Radović, Joseph Bissang, Carlos Peruga

17 December 2020	Žalgiris (Lithuania)	99–62	(Turkey) Fenerbahçe Beko	Kaunas
19:00 (CET)	Scoring by quarter: 24–7, 27–24, 30–16, 18–15
	Pts: Rubit 18; Rebs: Hayes 7 Asts: Grigonis 7 PIR: Rubit 27	Boxscore	Pts: de Colo 14; Rebs: de Colo 6 Asts: de Colo 3 PIR: de Colo 20	Arena: Žalgiris Arena; Attendance: 0 Referees: Saša Pukl, Carmelo Paternicò, Emilio Pérez

17 December 2020	Panathinaikos OPAP (Greece)	92–69	(Germany) ALBA Berlin	Marousi
20:00 (CET)	Scoring by quarter: 25–18, 14–14, 27–20, 26–17
	Pts: Papapetrou 22; Rebs: White 8 Asts: three players 4 PIR: Papagiannis, Papapetrou 22	Boxscore	Pts: Giffey 13; Rebs: Thiemann 7 Asts: Siva 6 PIR: Siva 18	Arena: O.A.K.A. Attendance: 0 Referees: Milivoje Jovčić, Emin Moğulkoç, Jakub Zamojski

18 December 2020	CSKA Moscow (Russia)	83–65	(Russia) Zenit Saint Petersburg	Moscow
18:00 (CET)	Scoring by quarter: 24–17, 21–14, 21–18, 17–16
	Pts: James 20; Rebs: Milutinov 13; Asts: James 7 PIR: James 32	Boxscore	Pts: Pangos 14; Rebs: Poythress 5 Asts: Baron 4 PIR: Thomas 16	Arena: Megasport Arena; Attendance: 2,713; Referees: Robert Lottermoser, Fernando Rocha, Miloš Koljenšić

18 December 2020	Crvena zvezda mts (Serbia)	76–73	(Spain) Valencia Basket	Belgrade
19:00 (CET)	Scoring by quarter: 20–22, 25–14, 12–21, 19–16
	Pts: Loyd 20; Rebs: Davidovac, Kuzmić 5 Asts: Loyd 6 PIR: Loyd, O'Bryant 18	Boxscore	Pts: Labeyrie, Prepelič 15; Rebs: Labeyrie 6 Asts: Hermannsson 5 PIR: Labeyrie 23	Arena: Aleksandar Nikolić Hall; Attendance: 0 Referees: Luigi Lamonica, Marcin Kowalski, Amit Balak

18 December 2020	Bayern Munich (Germany)	77–66	(Spain) TD Systems Baskonia	Munich
19:30 (CET)	Scoring by quarter: 18–15, 20–15, 20–20, 19–16
	Pts: Reynolds 21; Rebs: Reynolds 9 Asts: four players 3 PIR: Reynolds 29	Boxscore	Pts: Dragić 13; Rebs: Polonara 11; Asts: Henry 10; PIR: Polonara 17	Arena: Audi Dome; Attendance: 0 Referees: Damir Javor, Mehdi Difallah, Uroš Obrknežević

18 December 2020	Olympiacos (Greece)	82–86(OT)	(Spain) Real Madrid	Piraeus
20:00 (CET)	Scoring by quarter: 12–12, 18–19, 21–18, 18–20, Overtime: 13–17
	Pts: Martin, McKissic 18; Rebs: Martin, Vezenkov 6 Asts: Sloukas 7 PIR: Martin 17	Boxscore	Pts: Laprovíttola 19; Rebs: Tavares 10; Asts: Laprovíttola 6 PIR: Laprovíttola 27	Arena: Peace and Friendship Stadium; Attendance: 0 Referees: Borys Ryzhyk, Jakub Zamojski, Tomislav Hordov

18 December 2020	LDLC ASVEL (France)	90–84	(Russia) Khimki	Villeurbanne
20:45 (CET)	Scoring by quarter: 20–29, 23–22, 29–19, 18–14
	Pts: Yabusele 20; Rebs: Fall 6 Asts: Fall, Lighty 5 PIR: Yabusele 24	Boxscore	Pts: Booker 26; Rebs: Jerebko 6 Asts: Shved 10; PIR: Booker 32	Arena: Astroballe; Attendance: 0 Referees: Christos Christodoulou, Igor Dragojević, Sinan Isguder

18 December 2020	Barcelona (Spain)	67–68	(Israel) Maccabi Tel Aviv	Barcelona
21:00 (CET)	Scoring by quarter: 12–17, 20–13, 22–23, 13–15
	Pts: Higgins 16; Rebs: Mirotić 10; Asts: Calathes 4 PIR: Mirotić 20	Boxscore	Pts: Bender 15; Rebs: Caloiaro 7 Asts: Wilbekin 6 PIR: Wilbekin 15	Arena: Palau Blaugrana; Attendance: 0 Referees: Ilija Belošević, Matej Boltauzer, Robert Vyklický

=== Round 16 ===
22 December 2020	Zenit Saint Petersburg (Russia)	98–69	(Serbia) Crvena zvezda mts	Saint Petersburg
18:00 (CET)	Scoring by quarter: 30–12, 18–25, 21–17, 29–15
	Pts: Rivers 23; Rebs: Rivers, Thomas 4 Asts: Ponitka 6 PIR: Rivers 26	Boxscore	Pts: O'Bryant III 13; Rebs: O'Bryant III, Simonović 3 Asts: three players 2 PIR: O'Bryant III 12	Arena: Sibur Arena; Attendance: 0 Referees: Sreten Radović, Emin Moğulkoç, Jordi Aliaga

22 December 2020	Anadolu Efes (Turkey)	86–79	(Spain) Barcelona	Istanbul
18:30 (CET)	Scoring by quarter: 18–24, 25–19, 25–11, 18–25
	Pts: Larkin 23; Rebs: Larkin, Moerman 7 Asts: Larkin 8 PIR: Larkin 37	Boxscore	Pts: Mirotić 18; Rebs: Mirotić 8 Asts: Calathes 6 PIR: Mirotić 24	Arena: Sinan Erdem Dome; Attendance: 0 Referees: Robert Lottermoser, Damir Javor, Miloš Koljenšić

22 December 2020	Maccabi Tel Aviv (Israel)	89–81	(Greece) Panathinaikos OPAP	Tel Aviv
20:15 (CET)	Scoring by quarter: 21–12, 20–18, 18–22, 30–29
	Pts: Wilbekin 22; Rebs: Hunter 7 Asts: Wilbekin 4 PIR: Hunter 20	Boxscore	Pts: Nedović 39; Rebs: Papagiannis 11; Asts: Nedović 6 PIR: Nedović 45	Arena: Menora Mivtachim Arena; Attendance: 0 Referees: Luigi Lamonica, Emilio Pérez, Saulius Racys

22 December 2020	LDLC ASVEL (France)	78–87	(Russia) CSKA Moscow	Villeurbanne
20:45 (CET)	Scoring by quarter: 15–21, 26–25, 19–20, 18–21
	Pts: Yabusele 16; Rebs: Lighty, Yabusele 6 Asts: Cole 4 PIR: Yabusele 17	Boxscore	Pts: James 31; Rebs: Milutinov 14; Asts: James 6 PIR: Milutinov 30	Arena: Astroballe; Attendance: 0 Referees: Daniel Hierrezuelo, Matej Boltauzer, Anne Panther

22 December 2020	Real Madrid (Spain)	91–62	(Germany) ALBA Berlin	Madrid
21:00 (CET)	Scoring by quarter: 19–18, 26–12, 27–14, 19–18
	Pts: Tavares 16; Rebs: Tavares 11; Asts: Abalde 6 PIR: Tavares 27	Boxscore	Pts: Lô, Sikma 13; Rebs: Sikma 7 Asts: Thiemann 4 PIR: Lô, Sikma 12	Arena: WiZink Center; Attendance: 0 Referees: Christos Christodoulou, Mehdi Difallah, Tomasz Trawicki

23 December 2020	Žalgiris (Lithuania)	74–73	(Germany) Bayern Munich	Kaunas
18:00 (CET)	Scoring by quarter: 22–16, 18–19, 16–16, 18–22
	Pts: Grigonis 22; Rebs: Lauvergne 6 Asts: Lekavičius 5 PIR: Grigonis 23	Boxscore	Pts: Reynolds 17; Rebs: Reynolds 7 Asts: Seeley 5 PIR: Reynolds 20	Arena: Žalgiris Arena; Attendance: 0 Referees: Miguel Ángel Pérez, Fernando Rocha, Joseph Bissang

23 December 2020	Fenerbahçe Beko (Turkey)	84–77	(Greece) Olympiacos	Istanbul
18:45 (CET)	Scoring by quarter: 22–27, 23–14, 21–13, 18–23
	Pts: Veselý 17; Rebs: de Colo 8 Asts: de Colo, Veselý 5 PIR: Veselý 29	Boxscore	Pts: Vezenkov 17; Rebs: Jean-Charles 6 Asts: Sloukas 7 PIR: Vezenkov 21	Arena: Ülker Sports and Event Hall; Attendance: 0 Referees: Juan Carlos García, Piotr Pastusiak, Uroš Nikolić

23 December 2020	A|X Armani Exchange Milan (Italy)	79–84	(Spain) TD Systems Baskonia	Milan
20:45 (CET)	Scoring by quarter: 19–23, 22–22, 16–18, 22–21
	Pts: Punter 15; Rebs: LeDay 8 Asts: Rodríguez 5 PIR: LeDay, Rodríguez 12	Boxscore	Pts: Dragić 16; Rebs: Jekiri 12; Asts: Henry 8 PIR: Jekiri 25	Arena: Mediolanum Forum; Attendance: 0 Referees: Ilija Belošević, Borys Ryzhyk, Tomislav Hordov

23 December 2020	Valencia Basket (Spain)	88–82	(Russia) Khimki	Valencia
21:00 (CET)	Scoring by quarter: 16–13, 29–16, 14–23, 29–30
	Pts: Hermannsson 16; Rebs: Tobey 8 Asts: Hermannsson 9 PIR: Hermannsson 22	Boxscore	Pts: McCollum 16; Rebs: Timma, Jerebko 5 Asts: four players 3 PIR: McCollum 20	Arena: La Fonteta; Attendance: 0 Referees: Saša Pukl, Milivoje Jovčić, Elias Koromilas

=== Round 17 ===
29 December 2020	Khimki (Russia)	88–105	(Greece) Olympiacos	Khimki
18:00 (CET)	Scoring by quarter: 23–26, 27–25, 14–27, 24–27
	Pts: Shved 22; Rebs: Mickey 7 Asts: Shved 9 PIR: Shved 28	Boxscore	Pts: Sloukas 25; Rebs: Ellis 8 Asts: Sloukas 5 PIR: Sloukas 29	Arena: Mytishchi Arena; Attendance: 0 Referees: Damir Javor, Mehdi Difallah, Carlos Cortés

29 December 2020	Anadolu Efes (Turkey)	65–73	(Spain) Real Madrid	Istanbul
18:30 (CET)	Scoring by quarter: 20–13, 17–18, 14–21, 14–21
	Pts: Micić 16; Rebs: Dunston 7 Asts: Larkin, Micić 5 PIR: Micić 13	Boxscore	Pts: Causeur 15; Rebs: Tavares 9 Asts: Laprovittola 6 PIR: Laprovittola 14	Arena: Sinan Erdem Dome; Attendance: 0 Referees: Luigi Lamonica, Matej Boltauzer, Fernando Rocha

29 December 2020	ALBA Berlin (Germany)	71–74	(Lithuania) Žalgiris	Berlin
20:00 (CET)	Scoring by quarter: 14–12, 23–19, 11–23, 23–20
	Pts: Fontecchio 14; Rebs: Giffey 7 Asts: Granger, Sikma 5 PIR: Fontecchio, Sikma 16	Boxscore	Pts: Hayes 18; Rebs: Jankūnas, Lauvergne 7 Asts: Grigonis 5 PIR: Hayes 24	Arena: Mercedes-Benz Arena; Attendance: 0 Referees: Robert Vyklický, Piotr Pastusiak, Uroš Obrknežević

29 December 2020	Maccabi Tel Aviv (Israel)	72–78	(Russia) Zenit Saint Petersburg	Tel Aviv
20:05 (CET)	Scoring by quarter: 22–18, 13–19, 17–25, 20–16
	Pts: Wilbekin 18; Rebs: Bryant 5 Asts: Wilbekin 3 PIR: Wilbekin 16	Boxscore	Pts: Poythress 16; Rebs: Ponitka 7 Asts: Pangos 6 PIR: Ponitka 20	Arena: Menora Mivtachim Arena; Attendance: 0 Referees: Daniel Hierrezuelo, Saša Pukl, Elias Koromilas

29 December 2020	TD Systems Baskonia (Spain)	71–70	(Spain) Valencia Basket	Vitoria-Gasteiz
21:00 (CET)	Scoring by quarter: 17–30, 22–17, 16–11, 16–12
	Pts: Polonara 18; Rebs: Jekiri 8 Asts: Henry 6 PIR: Polonara 26	Boxscore	Pts: Kalinić 16; Rebs: Dubljević 8 Asts: Prepelič, Van Rossom 4 PIR: Kalinić 20	Arena: Buesa Arena; Attendance: 0 Referees: Robert Lottermoser, Emin Moğulkoç, Sébastien Clivaz

30 December 2020	Fenerbahçe Beko (Turkey)	81–59	(France) LDLC ASVEL	Istanbul
18:45 (CET)	Scoring by quarter: 15–19, 23–13, 21–10, 22–17
	Pts: Gudurić, Veselý 16; Rebs: Brown 7 Asts: three players 4 PIR: Gudurić 15	Boxscore	Pts: Lighty 11; Rebs: Hayes 6 Asts: Kahudi 4 PIR: four players 8	Arena: Ülker Sports and Event Hall; Attendance: 0 Referees: Ilija Belošević, Tomislav Hordov, Carlos Peruga

30 December 2020	Crvena zvezda mts (Serbia)	74–71	(Greece) Panathinaikos OPAP	Belgrade
19:00 (CET)	Scoring by quarter: 22–15, 26–22, 9–9, 17–25
	Pts: Walden 17; Rebs: Kuzmić 7 Asts: Walden 5 PIR: Walden 15	Boxscore	Pts: Papapetrou 20; Rebs: Papagiannis, Kaselakis 5 Asts: Mack 5 PIR: Papapetrou 15	Arena: Aleksandar Nikolić Hall; Attendance: 0 Referees: Miguel Ángel Pérez, Carmelo Paternicò, Seffi Shemmesh

30 December 2020	Bayern Munich (Germany)	90–77	(Spain) Barcelona	Munich
19:30 (CET)	Scoring by quarter: 22–26, 21–19, 27–10, 20–22
	Pts: Baldwin 29; Rebs: Reynolds 8 Asts: Baldwin 7 PIR: Baldwin 41	Boxscore	Pts: Abrines 16; Rebs: Abrines, Calathes 5 Asts: Calathes 8 PIR: Abrines 14	Arena: Audi Dome; Attendance: 0 Referees: Christos Christodoulou, Sreten Radović, Amit Balak

30 December 2020	A|X Armani Exchange Milan (Italy)	87–91(OT)	(Russia) CSKA Moscow	Milan
20:45 (CET)	Scoring by quarter: 17–17, 16–22, 25–20, 22–21, Overtime: 7–11
	Pts: LeDay 21; Rebs: Shields 8 Asts: Rodríguez 6 PIR: LeDay 31	Boxscore	Pts: James 20; Rebs: Milutinov 19; Asts: James 11; PIR: Milutinov 30	Arena: Mediolanum Forum; Attendance: 0 Referees: Juan Carlos García, Sašo Petek, Milivoje Jovčić

=== Round 18 ===
7 January 2021	Crvena zvezda mts (Serbia)	71–73	(Turkey) Fenerbahçe Beko	Belgrade
19:00 (CET)	Scoring by quarter: 22–18, 17–20, 14–15, 18–20
	Pts: O'Bryant 17; Rebs: O'Bryant 10; Asts: Colom 5 PIR: O'Bryant 30	Boxscore	Pts: Brown, Pierre 13; Rebs: Gudurić 8 Asts: Brown 4 PIR: Pierre 19	Arena: Aleksandar Nikolić Hall; Attendance: 183; Referees: Christos Christodoulou, Fernando Rocha, Robert Vyklický

7 January 2021	ALBA Berlin (Germany)	73–85	(Israel) Maccabi Tel Aviv	Berlin
20:00 (CET)	Scoring by quarter: 17–24, 11–19, 21–20, 24–22
	Pts: Fontecchio 15; Rebs: Granger 6 Asts: Granger 11; PIR: Granger 28	Boxscore	Pts: Dorsey 25; Rebs: Caloiaro, Žižić 6 Asts: Jones 5 PIR: Dorsey 27	Arena: Mercedes-Benz Arena; Attendance: 0 Referees: Damir Javor, Tomislav Hordov, Michele Rossi

7 January 2021	Panathinaikos OPAP (Greece)	77–89	(Russia) Zenit Saint Petersburg	Marousi
20:00 (CET)	Scoring by quarter: 16–26, 19–21, 19–29, 23–13
	Pts: Papapetrou 14; Rebs: Mitoglou 7 Asts: Mack, Sant-Roos 4 PIR: Mitoglou 19	Boxscore	Pts: Gudaitis 25; Rebs: Thomas 7 Asts: Pangos 10; PIR: Pangos 25	Arena: O.A.K.A. Attendance: 0 Referees: Matej Boltauzer, Mehdi Difallah, Amit Balak

7 January 2021	Barcelona (Spain)	89–72	(Spain) Valencia Basket	Barcelona
21:00 (CET)	Scoring by quarter: 18–12, 20–21, 29–21, 22–18
	Pts: Abrines 16; Rebs: Martinez 8 Asts: Calathes 7 PIR: Abrines 18	Boxscore	Pts: Labeyrie 17; Rebs: Tobey 10; Asts: three players 3 PIR: Tobey 22	Arena: Palau Blaugrana; Attendance: 0 Referees: Carmelo Paternicò, Sérgio Silva, Uroš Nikolić

7 January 2021	TD Systems Baskonia (Spain)	95–93	(Russia) CSKA Moscow	Vitoria-Gasteiz
21:00 (CET)	Scoring by quarter: 31–19, 15–26, 33–22, 16–26
	Pts: Henry, Polonara 18; Rebs: Y. Fall 9 Asts: Henry 10; PIR: Henry 27	Boxscore	Pts: James 20; Rebs: Bolomboy, Shengelia 9 Asts: James 7 PIR: James 25	Arena: Buesa Arena; Attendance: 0 Referees: Luigi Lamonica, Saša Pukl, Joseph Bissang

8 January 2021	Žalgiris (Lithuania)	102–75	(Russia) Khimki	Kaunas
19:00 (CET)	Scoring by quarter: 22–20, 17–28, 39–13, 24–14
	Pts: Lauvergne 29; Rebs: Lauvergne 9 Asts: Grigonis 8 PIR: Lauvergne 38	Boxscore	Pts: Shved 22; Rebs: Booker 7 Asts: Shved 8 PIR: Booker 28	Arena: Žalgiris Arena; Attendance: 0 Referees: Sreten Radović, Anne Panther, Tomasz Trawicki

8 January 2021	Olympiacos (Greece)	84–82	(Germany) Bayern Munich	Piraeus
20:00 (CET)	Scoring by quarter: 19–22, 25–24, 20–15, 20–21
	Pts: Sloukas 24; Rebs: Vezenkov 6 Asts: Sloukas 7 PIR: Sloukas 29	Boxscore	Pts: Seeley 26; Rebs: three players 4 Asts: Baldwin 5 PIR: Seeley 26	Arena: Peace and Friendship Stadium; Attendance: 0 Referees: Matej Boltauzer, Milivoje Jovcic, Igor Dragojevic

8 January 2021	LDLC ASVEL (France)	80–102	(Turkey) Anadolu Efes	Villeurbanne
20:45 (CET)
	Pts: Cole 22; Rebs: Hayes, Howard 4 Asts: Diot, Walton 4 PIR: Cole 19	Boxscore	Pts: Micić 23; Rebs: Anderson 11; Asts: Micić 9 PIR: Micić 35	Arena: Astroballe; Attendance: 0 Referees: Borys Ryzhyk, Carlos Cortés, Spiros Gkontas

8 January 2021	Real Madrid (Spain)	76–80	(Italy) A|X Armani Exchange Milan	Madrid
21:00 (CET)	Scoring by quarter: 18–17, 21–22, 10–22, 27–19
	Pts: Carroll 20; Rebs: Thompkins 7 Asts: Alocén 5 PIR: Tavares 27	Boxscore	Pts: Rodríguez 17; Rebs: Moraschini 10; Asts: Delaney 5 PIR: Delaney, Datome 15	Arena: WiZink Center; Attendance: 0 Referees: Robert Lottermoser, Emin Moğulkoç, Piotr Pastusiak

=== Round 19 ===
12 January 2021	Khimki (Russia)	75–87	(Spain) Barcelona	Khimki
18:00 (CET)	Scoring by quarter: 26–26, 22–28, 12–19, 15–14
	Pts: Shved 23; Rebs: Booker 5 Asts: Shved 6 PIR: Shved 20	Boxscore	Pts: Higgins, Kuric 18; Rebs: Oriola 10; Asts: Calathes 15; PIR: Higgins 28	Arena: Mytishchi Arena; Attendance: 0 Referees: Borys Ryzhyk, Tomislav Hordov, Robert Vyklicky

12 January 2021	Anadolu Efes (Turkey)	84–76	(Germany) ALBA Berlin	Istanbul
18:30 (CET)	Scoring by quarter: 18–18, 18–26, 26–9, 22–23
	Pts: three players 15; Rebs: Dunston 9 Asts: Micić 8 PIR: Moerman 19	Boxscore	Pts: Granger 17; Rebs: Thiemann 8 Asts: Granger, Lo 4 PIR: Granger 18	Arena: Sinan Erdem Dome; Referees: Sasa Pukl, Carmelo Paternico, Elias Koromilas

12 January 2021	Fenerbahçe Beko (Turkey)	96–76	(Spain) TD Systems Baskonia	Istanbul
18:45 (CET)	Scoring by quarter: 28–18, 23–23, 24–15, 21–20
	Pts: de Colo 27; Rebs: Gudurić, Düverioğlu 7 Asts: Gudurić 6 PIR: de Colo 30	Boxscore	Pts: Peters 15; Rebs: Peters 5 Asts: Vildoza, Polonara 5 PIR: Polonara 18	Arena: Ülker Sports and Event Hall; Attendance: 150; Referees: Damir Javor, Milivoje Jovčić, Anne Panther

12 January 2021	Maccabi Tel Aviv (Israel)	87–89(OT)	(Greece) Olympiacos	Tel Aviv
20:05 (CET)	Scoring by quarter: 18–13, 22–20, 15–19, 18–21, Overtime: 14–16
	Pts: Wilbekin 25; Rebs: Hunter 10; Asts: Bryant 4 PIR: Bryant 21	Boxscore	Pts: Sloukas 21; Rebs: Vezenkov 7 Asts: Sloukas 11; PIR: Sloukas 24	Arena: Menora Mivtachim Arena; Attendance: 0 Referees: Fernando Rocha, Seffi Shemmesh, Josip Radojković

12 January 2021	A|X Armani Exchange Milan (Italy)	95–80	(Spain) Valencia Basket	Milan
20:45 (CET)	Scoring by quarter: 21–20, 33–16, 22–24, 19–20
	Pts: Datome 27; Rebs: Datome 6 Asts: Moraschini, Roll 4 PIR: Datome 26	Boxscore	Pts: Williams 17; Rebs: Labeyrie 7 Asts: Vives 5 PIR: Williams 22	Arena: Mediolanum Forum; Attendance: 0 Referees: Matej Boltauzer, Gytis Vilius, Artūras Šukys

13 January 2021	CSKA Moscow (Russia)	83–73	(Lithuania) Žalgiris	Moscow
18:00 (CET)	Scoring by quarter: 18–11, 27–21, 15–20, 23–21
	Pts: James 21; Rebs: Milutinov 14; Asts: Kurbanov 7 PIR: Milutinov 22	Boxscore	Pts: Grigonis 16; Rebs: Rubit 7 Asts: Lauvergne, Walkup 5 PIR: Grigonis, Walkup 14	Arena: Megasport Arena; Attendance: 3,120; Referees: Robert Lottermoser, Emin Moğulkoç, Gentian Cici

13 January 2021	Bayern Munich (Germany)	82–80	(Russia) Zenit Saint Petersburg	Munich
19:30 (CET)	Scoring by quarter: 13–19, 19–21, 24–16, 26–24
	Pts: Baldwin 17; Rebs: Reynolds 6 Asts: Baldwin 5 PIR: Baldwin 22	Boxscore	Pts: Gudaitis 22; Rebs: Ponitka, Gudaitis 6 Asts: Pangos 6 PIR: Gudaitis 28	Arena: Audi Dome; Attendance: 0 Referees: Luigi Lamonica, Carlos Cortés, Marcin Kowalski

13 January 2021	Panathinaikos OPAP (Greece)	88–71	(France) LDLC ASVEL	Marousi
20:00 (CET)	Scoring by quarter: 25–21, 20–21, 25–18, 18–11
	Pts: Nedović 33; Rebs: Mitoglou 9 Asts: Sant-Roos 7 PIR: Nedović 40	Boxscore	Pts: Cole 15; Rebs: M. Fall 9 Asts: Diot, M. Fall 3 PIR: M. Fall 19	Arena: O.A.K.A. Attendance: 0 Referees: Sreten Radović, Jordi Aliaga, Jurgis Laurinavičius

18 January 2021	Real Madrid (Spain)	77–79	(Serbia) Crvena zvezda mts	Madrid
19:00 (CET)	Scoring by quarter: 21–23, 19–22, 18–21, 19–13
	Pts: Fernández 11; Rebs: Tavares 9 Asts: Laprovíttola 10; PIR: Laprovíttola 18	Boxscore	Pts: Walden 18; Rebs: Kuzmić 9 Asts: Dobrić 3 PIR: Dobrić 21	Arena: WiZink Center; Attendance: 0 Referees: Christos Christodoulou, Gytis Vilius, Hugues Thepenier

=== Round 20 ===
14 January 2021	Anadolu Efes (Turkey)	99–60	(Russia) Khimki	Istanbul
18:30 (CET)	Scoring by quarter: 26–19, 26–17, 23–10, 24–14
	Pts: Şanlı 19; Rebs: Beaubois, Moerman 6 Asts: Micić 6 PIR: Larkin 25	Boxscore	Pts: Mickey 14; Rebs: Booker 8 Asts: Zaytsev 4 PIR: Mickey 15	Arena: Sinan Erdem Dome; Attendance: 0 Referees: Daniel Hierrezuelo, Milivoje Jovčić, Josip Radojković

14 January 2021	ALBA Berlin (Germany)	70–84	(Italy) A|X Armani Exchange Milan	Berlin
20:00 (CET)	Scoring by quarter: 18–13, 16–29, 22–22, 14–20
	Pts: Lammers 18; Rebs: Thiemann 7 Asts: Granger 6 PIR: Granger 21	Boxscore	Pts: LeDay 16; Rebs: Tarczewski 6 Asts: Rodríguez, Delaney 7 PIR: Hines 17	Arena: Mercedes-Benz Arena; Attendance: 0 Referees: Christos Christodoulou, Sérgio Silva, Seffi Shemmesh

14 January 2021	Maccabi Tel Aviv (Israel)	91–82	(Spain) TD Systems Baskonia	Tel Aviv
20:05 (CET)	Scoring by quarter: 26–21, 21–22, 21–17, 23–22
	Pts: Bryant, Hunter 14; Rebs: Hunter 5 Asts: Bryant, Wilbekin 4 PIR: Bryant, Hunter 20	Boxscore	Pts: Henry 19; Rebs: four players 5 Asts: Henry 8 PIR: Henry 24	Arena: Menora Mivtachim Arena; Attendance: 0 Referees: Carmelo Paternicò, Uroš Nikolić, Mykola Ambrosov

15 January 2021	Zenit Saint Petersburg (Russia)	77–65	(Lithuania) Žalgiris	Saint Petersburg
18:00 (CET)	Scoring by quarter: 17–14, 19–22, 20–13, 21–16
	Pts: Ponitka, Gudaitis 15; Rebs: Gudaitis 8 Asts: Pangos 7 PIR: Gudaitis 28	Boxscore	Pts: Walkup 12; Rebs: Jankūnas, Geben 4 Asts: five players 2 PIR: Walkup 13	Arena: Sibur Arena; Attendance: 712; Referees: Ilija Belošević, Tomislav Hordov, Robert Vyklický

15 January 2021	CSKA Moscow (Russia)	75–88	(Spain) Barcelona	Moscow
18:00 (CET)	Scoring by quarter: 25–20, 16–22, 15–22, 19–24
	Pts: James 18; Rebs: Hilliard 9 Asts: James, Strēlnieks 4 PIR: Milutinov 23	Boxscore	Pts: Higgins 25; Rebs: three players 6 Asts: Calathes 7 PIR: Higgins 28	Arena: Megasport Arena; Attendance: 3125; Referees: Matej Boltauzer, Mehdi Difallah, Fernando Rocha

15 January 2021	Fenerbahçe Beko (Turkey)	100–74	(Greece) Panathinaikos OPAP	Istanbul
18:00 (CET)	Scoring by quarter: 31–12, 17–22, 26–21, 26–19
	Pts: Gudurić 18; Rebs: Veselý 7 Asts: Brown, de Colo 5 PIR: Gudurić 20	Boxscore	Pts: White 13; Rebs: Mitoglou 7 Asts: Nedović 6 PIR: White 16	Arena: Ülker Sports and Event Hall; Attendance: 200; Referees: Luigi Lamonica, Emilio Pérez, Gytis Vilius

15 January 2021	Bayern Munich (Germany)	76–81(OT)	(Spain) Real Madrid	Munich
20:30 (CET)	Scoring by quarter: 15–23, 19–16, 16–12, 22–21, Overtime: 4–9
	Pts: Reynolds 18; Rebs: Baldwin 7 Asts: Baldwin 4 PIR: Reynolds 17	Boxscore	Pts: Tavares 26; Rebs: Tavares, Thompkins 9 Asts: Laprovíttola 7 PIR: Tavares 29	Arena: Audi Dome; Attendance: 0 Referees: Damir Javor, Tomasz Trawicki, Saulius Racys

15 January 2021	Olympiacos (Greece)	63–69	(France) LDLC ASVEL	Piraeus
20:30 (CET)	Scoring by quarter: 17–17, 16–17, 9–17, 21–18
	Pts: Harrison 13; Rebs: Vezenkov, McKissic 5 Asts: Sloukas 7 PIR: Harrison 17	Boxscore	Pts: Yabusele 19; Rebs: Bako 6 Asts: three players 4 PIR: Yabusele 29	Arena: Peace and Friendship Stadium; Attendance: 0 Referees: Juan Carlos García, Piotr Pastusiak, Sébastien Clivaz

15 January 2021	Valencia Basket (Spain)	91–71	(Serbia) Crvena zvezda mts	Valencia
21:00 (CET)	Scoring by quarter: 27–15, 22–27, 19–15, 23–14
	Pts: Labeyrie 16; Rebs: Tobey 5 Asts: Kalinić 7 PIR: Van Rossom 21	Boxscore	Pts: O'Bryant 21; Rebs: Jagodić-Kuridža 6 Asts: Hall 4 PIR: Jagodić-Kuridža 14	Arena: La Fonteta; Attendance: 0 Referees: Borys Ryzhyk, Elias Koromilas, Aare Halliko

=== Round 21 ===
21 January 2021	Zenit Saint Petersburg (Russia)	85–78	(Turkey) Anadolu Efes	Saint Petersburg
18:00 (CET)	Scoring by quarter: 28–15, 25–16, 11–24, 21–23
	Pts: Thomas 14; Rebs: Gudaitis 10; Asts: Hollins 5 PIR: Gudaitis 24	Boxscore	Pts: Micić 23; Rebs: Dunston 9 Asts: Larkin 5 PIR: Micić 25	Arena: Sibur Arena; Attendance: 719; Referees: Christos Christodoulou, Oļegs Latiševs, Carlos Peruga

21 January 2021	Panathinaikos OPAP (Greece)	94–78	(Russia) Khimki	Marousi
20:00 (CET)	Scoring by quarter: 23–20, 23–13, 24–18, 24–27
	Pts: Mitoglou 29; Rebs: Mitoglou 12; Asts: Nedović 5 PIR: Mitoglou 42	Boxscore	Pts: Mickey 25; Rebs: Mickey 7 Asts: Jović 8 PIR: Mickey 30	Arena: O.A.K.A. Attendance: 0 Referees: Miguel Ángel Pérez, Jakub Zamojski, Seffi Shemmesh

21 January 2021	Maccabi Tel Aviv (Israel)	86–84	(Spain) Real Madrid	Tel Aviv
20:05 (CET)	Scoring by quarter: 24–33, 21–13, 18–20, 23–18
	Pts: Dorsey 30; Rebs: three players 4 Asts: Wilbekin 8 PIR: Dorsey 36	Boxscore	Pts: Thompkins 20; Rebs: Tavares, Thompkins 8 Asts: Abalde 7 PIR: Thompkins 27	Arena: Menora Mivtachim Arena; Attendance: 0 Referees: Sreten Radović, Mehdi Difallah, Anne Panther

21 January 2021	A|X Armani Exchange Milan (Italy)	75–51	(Germany) Bayern Munich	Milan
20:45 (CET)	Scoring by quarter: 20–10, 22–10, 21–15, 12–16
	Pts: Rodríguez 14; Rebs: LeDay 8 Asts: Delaney 4 PIR: LeDay 19	Boxscore	Pts: Reynolds 12; Rebs: Radošević, Reynolds 5 Asts: Flaccadori, Weiler-Babb 2 PIR: Reynolds 13	Arena: Mediolanum Forum; Attendance: 0 Referees: Saša Pukl, Emilio Pérez, Uroš Nikolić

21 January 2021	LDLC ASVEL (France)	90–77	(Spain) Valencia Basket	Villeurbanne
20:45 (CET)	Scoring by quarter: 17–17, 23–17, 21–20, 29–23
	Pts: Howard 17; Rebs: three players 4 Asts: Diot, Cole 6 PIR: Howard 24	Boxscore	Pts: Kalinić 18; Rebs: Tobey 9 Asts: Hermannsson 7 PIR: Kalinić 19	Arena: Astroballe; Attendance: 0 Referees: Luigi Lamonica, Emin Moğulkoç, Milan Nedović

22 January 2021	CSKA Moscow (Russia)	83–89	(Turkey) Fenerbahçe Beko	Moscow
18:00 (CET)	Scoring by quarter: 21–15, 17–23, 28–25, 17–26
	Pts: Shengelia 18; Rebs: Milutinov 7 Asts: Shengelia 4 PIR: Milutinov 21	Boxscore	Pts: Veselý 24; Rebs: Veselý 6 Asts: de Colo 9 PIR: de Colo 38	Arena: Megasport Arena; Attendance: 4277; Referees: Juan Carlos García, Mario Majkić, Hugues Thépénier

22 January 2021	Crvena zvezda mts (Serbia)	60–72	(Spain) Barcelona	Belgrade
19:00 (CET)	Scoring by quarter: 11–21, 20–14, 14–22, 15–15
	Pts: Dobrić 11; Rebs: O'Bryant 8 Asts: Colom 4 PIR: Walden, Davidovac 11	Boxscore	Pts: Higgins 14; Rebs: Mirotić 8 Asts: Calathes 5 PIR: Oriola, Calathes 17	Arena: Aleksandar Nikolić Hall; Attendance: 0 Referees: Robert Lottermoser, Marcin Kowalski, Michele Rossi

22 January 2021	Žalgiris (Lithuania)	81–79	(Greece) Olympiacos	Kaunas
19:00 (CET)	Scoring by quarter: 26–20, 19–24, 18–16, 18–19
	Pts: Lauvergne 21; Rebs: Lauvergne 7 Asts: Grigonis 7 PIR: Lauvergne 27	Boxscore	Pts: Sloukas, Printezis 16; Rebs: Vezenkov 7 Asts: Sloukas 6 PIR: Vezenkov 18	Arena: Žalgiris Arena; Attendance: 0 Referees: Daniel Hierrezuelo, Ilija Belošević, Carmelo Paternicò

22 January 2021	TD Systems Baskonia (Spain)	77–84	(Germany) ALBA Berlin	Vitoria-Gasteiz
21:00 (CET)	Scoring by quarter: 18–21, 32–25, 11–21, 16–17
	Pts: Polonara 23; Rebs: Polonara 9 Asts: Henry 9 PIR: Polonara 27	Boxscore	Pts: Siva 14; Rebs: Sikma 8 Asts: Granger 8 PIR: Granger 17	Arena: Buesa Arena; Attendance: 0 Referees: Borys Ryzhyk, Gytis Vilius, Sinan Isguder

=== Round 22 ===
26 January 2021	Anadolu Efes (Turkey)	86–72	(Serbia) Crvena zvezda mts	Istanbul
17:00 (CET)	Scoring by quarter: 29–13, 27–22, 19–17, 11–20
	Pts: Larkin 23; Rebs: Moerman 10; Asts: Simon 6 PIR: Larkin 24	Boxscore	Pts: Davidovac, Dobrić 12; Rebs: Reath 6 Asts: Colom 5 PIR: Davidovac 17	Arena: Sinan Erdem Dome; Attendance: 0 Referees: Juan Carlos Garcia, Jakub Zamojski, Artem Lavrukhin

26 January 2021	Khimki (Russia)	93–95	(Germany) Bayern Munich	Khimki
18:00 (CET)	Scoring by quarter: 15–26, 29–18, 31–29, 18–22
	Pts: Shved 32; Rebs: Valiev 6 Asts: Shved 11; PIR: Shved 31	Boxscore	Pts: Weiler-Babb 25; Rebs: Gist, Weiler-Babb 6 Asts: Weiler-Babb 5 PIR: Weiler-Babb 38	Arena: Mytishchi Arena; Attendance: 334; Referees: Matej Boltauzer, Olges Latisevs, Uros Obrknezevic

26 January 2021	Fenerbahçe Beko (Turkey)	82–75	(Israel) Maccabi Tel Aviv	Istanbul
19:00 (CET)	Scoring by quarter: 17–21, 19–14, 24–18, 22–22
	Pts: Veselý 18; Rebs: Veselý 6 Asts: Brown 6 PIR: Veselý 29	Boxscore	Pts: Bryant 18; Rebs: Hunter 8 Asts: Wilbekin 10; PIR: Wilbekin 22	Arena: Ülker Sports and Event Hall; Attendance: 380; Referees: Robert Lottermoser, Milan Nerdovic, Milos Koljensic

26 January 2021	A|X Armani Exchange Milan (Italy)	90–79	(Greece) Olympiacos	Milan
20:45 (CET)	Scoring by quarter: 24–19, 20–15, 21–28, 25–17
	Pts: Punter 27; Rebs: LeDay 7 Asts: Delaney, Punter 5 PIR: Punter 33	Boxscore	Pts: Vezenkov 18; Rebs: Vezenkov 10; Asts: Sloukas 7 PIR: Vezenkov 20	Arena: Mediolanum Forum; Attendance: 0 Referees: Borys Ryzhyk, Mehdi Difallah, Anne Panther

26 January 2021	Barcelona (Spain)	85–81	(Russia) Zenit Saint Petersburg	Barcelona
21:00 (CET)	Scoring by quarter: 16–14, 28–19, 25–17, 16–31
	Pts: Davies 18; Rebs: Calathes, Oriola 7 Asts: Calathes 12; PIR: Calathes, Kuric 21	Boxscore	Pts: Gudaitis, Zubkov 15; Rebs: Ponitka 8 Asts: Pangos, Ponitka 5 PIR: Gudaitis 21	Arena: Palau Blaugrana; Attendance: 0 Referees: Sreten Radovic, Gytis Vilius, Emin Mogulkoc

27 January 2021	ALBA Berlin (Germany)	68–71	(Russia) CSKA Moscow	Berlin
20:00 (CET)	Scoring by quarter: 15–20, 22–14, 19–18, 12–19
	Pts: Siva 15; Rebs: Lammers 6 Asts: three players 4 PIR: Siva 24	Boxscore	Pts: Shengelia 20; Rebs: Milutinov 11; Asts: three players 3 PIR: Shengelia 21	Arena: Mercedes-Benz Arena; Attendance: 0 Referees: Luigi Lamonica, Emilio Perez, Sebastien Clivaz

27 January 2021	LDLC ASVEL (France)	83–77	(Spain) TD Systems Baskonia	Villeurbanne
20:45 (CET)	Scoring by quarter: 17–26, 18–20, 23–7, 25–24
	Pts: Lighty 21; Rebs: Bako 5 Asts: Lighty 3 PIR: Lighty 21	Boxscore	Pts: Peters 15; Rebs: Jekiri 8 Asts: Vildoza 7 PIR: Fall, Polonara 15	Arena: Astroballe; Attendance: 0 Referees: Sasa Pukl, Piotr Pastusiak, Saulius Racys

27 January 2021	Real Madrid (Spain)	76–66	(Greece) Panathinaikos OPAP	Madrid
21:00 (CET)	Scoring by quarter: 25–12, 24–15, 15–23, 12–16
	Pts: Deck 20; Rebs: Deck 9 Asts: Thompkins 5 PIR: Deck 29	Boxscore	Pts: Nedović 18; Rebs: Mitoglou, Bentil 7 Asts: Foster 3 PIR: Auguste, Foster 11	Arena: WiZink Center; Attendance: 0 Referees: Ilija Belošević, Carmelo Paternicò, Tomislav Hordov

27 January 2021	Valencia Basket (Spain)	78–79	(Lithuania) Žalgiris	Valencia
21:00 (CET)	Scoring by quarter: 20–20, 18–27, 17–13, 23–19
	Pts: Prepelič 18; Rebs: Tobey 9 Asts: Van Rossom 4 PIR: Prepelič 20	Boxscore	Pts: Rubit 17; Rebs: Lauvergne 12; Asts: Jokūbaitis 6 PIR: Rubit 17	Arena: La Fonteta; Attendance: 0 Referees: Fernando Rocha, Sašo Petek, Spiros Gkontas

=== Round 23 ===
28 January 2021	Khimki (Russia)	76–107	(Turkey) Fenerbahçe Beko	Khimki
18:00 (CET)	Scoring by quarter: 22–23, 22–30, 13–30, 19–24
	Pts: Shved 29; Rebs: Valiev 6 Asts: Shved 5 PIR: Voronov 16	Boxscore	Pts: De Colo 18; Rebs: Pierre 6 Asts: Brown 6 PIR: Veselý 27	Arena: Mytishchi Arena; Attendance: 594; Referees: Christos Christodoulou, Carlos Cortes, Marcin Kowalski

28 January 2021	Olympiacos (Greece)	74–76	(Spain) Barcelona	Piraeus
20:00 (CET)	Scoring by quarter: 12–21, 18–19, 23–10, 21–26
	Pts: McKissic 18; Rebs: Ellis 13; Asts: Sloukas 5 PIR: Spanoulis 13	Boxscore	Pts: Mirotić 16; Rebs: Mirotić 5 Asts: Calathes 7 PIR: Oriola 17	Arena: Peace and Friendship Stadium; Attendance: 0 Referees: Damir Javor, Milivoje Jovčić, Tomasz Trawicki

28 January 2021	A|X Armani Exchange Milan (Italy)	82–76	(Russia) Zenit Saint Petersburg	Milan
20:45 (CET)	Scoring by quarter: 16–24, 19–20, 21–15, 26–17
	Pts: Punter 14; Rebs: Hines 8 Asts: Hines 3 PIR: Hines 20	Boxscore	Pts: Hollins, Pangos 12; Rebs: three players 5 Asts: Pangos 5 PIR: Ponitka 13	Arena: Mediolanum Forum; Attendance: 0 Referees: Juan Carlos García, Robert Lottermoser, Milan Nedović

29 January 2021	CSKA Moscow (Russia)	66–69	(Germany) Bayern Munich	Moscow
18:00 (CET)	Scoring by quarter: 27–25, 12–15, 21–10, 6–19
	Pts: Milutinov 16; Rebs: Hackett, Kurbanov 8 Asts: Hackett, Shengelia 3 PIR: Milutinov 21	Boxscore	Pts: Baldwin 22; Rebs: Reynolds 8 Asts: Seeley 5 PIR: Reynolds 22	Arena: Megasport Arena; Attendance: 4,516; Referees: Miguel Angel Perez, Sreten Radovic, Mykola Ambrosov

29 January 2021	ALBA Berlin (Germany)	63–72	(Spain) Real Madrid	Berlin
20:00 (CET)	Scoring by quarter: 14–22, 16–18, 17–19, 16–13
	Pts: Sikma 16; Rebs: Sikma 6 Asts: Granger 8 PIR: Sikma 21	Boxscore	Pts: Causeur 13; Rebs: Tavares 10; Asts: Causeur 5 PIR: Tavares 21	Arena: Mercedes-Benz Arena; Attendance: 0 Referees: Saša Pukl, Joseph Bissang, Michele Rossi

29 January 2021	Panathinaikos OPAP (Greece)	91–72	(Spain) Valencia Basket	Marousi
20:00 (CET)	Scoring by quarter: 22–20, 26–14, 20–18, 23–20
	Pts: Nedović 16; Rebs: Papagiannis 9 Asts: Nedović 7 PIR: Bochoridis 19	Boxscore	Pts: Prepelič 20; Rebs: Tobey, Dubljević 5 Asts: Van Rossom, Hermannsson 5 PIR: Prepelič 21	Arena: O.A.K.A. Attendance: 0 Referees: Oļegs Latiševs, Piotr Pastusiak, Anne Panther

29 January 2021	Crvena zvezda mts (Serbia)	78–81	(France) LDLC ASVEL	Belgrade
20:45 (CET)	Scoring by quarter: 23–25, 15–20, 18–12, 22–24
	Pts: Walden, Dobrić 17; Rebs: Kuzmić 7 Asts: Walden, Loyd 3 PIR: Walden 22	Boxscore	Pts: Cole 22; Rebs: M.Fall 5 Asts: Lacombe 6 PIR: Cole 25	Arena: Aleksandar Nikolić Hall; Attendance: 0 Referees: Daniel Hierrezuelo, Fernando Rocha, Kristaps Konstantinovs

29 January 2021	TD Systems Baskonia (Spain)	81–68	(Lithuania) Žalgiris	Vitoria-Gasteiz
21:00 (CET)	Scoring by quarter: 21–20, 24–16, 16–12, 20–20
	Pts: Henry 19; Rebs: Jekiri, Peters 7 Asts: Peters 5 PIR: Peters 23	Boxscore	Pts: Grigonis 17; Rebs: Lauvergne 7 Asts: Walkup, Lauvergne 4 PIR: Lauvergne 21	Arena: Buesa Arena; Attendance: 0 Referees: Luigi Lamonica, Emin Moğulkoç, Rain Peerandi

16 March 2021	Maccabi Tel Aviv (Israel)	66–90	(Turkey) Anadolu Efes	Tel Aviv
18:30 (CET)	Scoring by quarter: 17–22, 14–25, 16–24, 19–19
	Pts: Wilbekin 15; Rebs: Žižić 6 Asts: Jones 4 PIR: Wilbekin 14	Boxscore	Pts: Larkin, Micić 15; Rebs: three players Asts: Simon 6 PIR: Larkin 20	Arena: Menora Mivtachim Arena; Attendance: 1,000; Referees: Ilija Belošević, Robert Vyklický, Milan Nedović

=== Round 24 ===
4 February 2021	Valencia Basket (Spain)	105–103(OT)	(Russia) CSKA Moscow	Valencia
21:00 (CET)	Scoring by quarter: 25–17, 22–26, 17–20, 20–21, Overtime: 11–11, 10–8
	Pts: Kalinić, Prepelič 22; Rebs: Dubljević 12; Asts: Prepelič 6 PIR: Kalinić, Prepelič 23	Boxscore	Pts: James 37; Rebs: Voigtmann 9 Asts: James 7 PIR: James 31	Arena: La Fonteta; Attendance: 0 Referees: Sasa Pukl, Jakub Zamojski, Josip Radojković

4 February 2021	Barcelona (Spain)	86–88	(Turkey) Anadolu Efes	Barcelona
21:00 (CET)	Scoring by quarter: 22–27, 28–26, 15–19, 21–16
	Pts: Mirotić 24; Rebs: Davies 7 Asts: Calathes 5 PIR: Mirotić 25	Boxscore	Pts: Micić 26; Rebs: Sanli 8 Asts: Micić 5 PIR: Micić 30	Arena: Palau Blaugrana; Attendance: 0 Referees: Ilija Belošević, Carmelo Paternicò, Milan Nedović

5 February 2021	Fenerbahçe Beko (Turkey)	92–84	(Russia) Zenit Saint Petersburg	Istanbul
18:45 (CET)	Scoring by quarter: 25–25, 22–18, 19–22, 26–19
	Pts: De Colo 24; Rebs: Gudurić 6 Asts: De Colo 7 PIR: De Colo 28	Boxscore	Pts: Thomas 21; Rebs: Thomas 6 Asts: Pangos 7 PIR: Thomas 26	Arena: Ülker Sports and Event Hall; Attendance: 300; Referees: Luigi Lamonica, Borys Ryzhyk, Luka Kardum

5 February 2021	Olympiacos (Greece)	77–88	(Greece) Panathinaikos OPAP	Piraeus
20:00 (CET)	Scoring by quarter: 18–21, 17–17, 19–23, 23–27
	Pts: McKissic 20; Rebs: McKissic 5 Asts: Sloukas, Spanoulis 6 PIR: McKissic 21	Boxscore	Pts: Sant-Roos 20; Rebs: Papapetrou 9 Asts: Papapetrou, Sant-Roos 5 PIR: Sant-Roos 27	Arena: Peace and Friendship Stadium; Attendance: 0 Referees: Sreten Radović, Carlos Cortés, Gytis Vilius

5 February 2021	Bayern Munich (Germany)	101–95(OT)	(Germany) ALBA Berlin	Munich
20:30 (CET)	Scoring by quarter: 10–26, 23–17, 25–23, 29–21, Overtime: 14–8
	Pts: Reynolds 24; Rebs: Lučić, Weiler-Babb 6 Asts: Baldwin; PIR: Reynolds 30	Boxscore	Pts: Fontecchio 21; Rebs: Sikma 10; Asts: Sikma 10; PIR: Fontecchio 26	Arena: Audi Dome; Attendance: 0 Referees: Damir Javor, Spiros Gkontas, Jurgis Laurinavičius

5 February 2021	LDLC ASVEL (France)	78–69	(Italy) A|X Armani Exchange Milan	Villeurbanne
20:45 (CET)	Scoring by quarter: 20–23, 17–17, 15–16, 26–13
	Pts: Lighty 16; Rebs: M. Fall 8 Asts: Cole 4 PIR: Lighty 21	Boxscore	Pts: Shields 18; Rebs: Tarczewski 7 Asts: Punter 6 PIR: Shields 19	Arena: Astroballe; Attendance: 0 Referees: Miguel Ángel Pérez, Sašo Petek, Tomasz Trawicki

5 February 2021	Real Madrid (Spain)	64–84	(Spain) TD Systems Baskonia	Madrid
21:00 (CET)	Scoring by quarter: 15–28, 19–9, 18–23, 12–24
	Pts: Abalde 12; Rebs: Tavares 8 Asts: Alocén 4 PIR: Deck 17	Boxscore	Pts: Polonara 18; Rebs: Sedekerskis 7 Asts: Henry 10; PIR: Vildoza 19	Arena: WiZink Center; Attendance: 0 Referees: Robert Lottermoser, Oļegs Latiševs, Robert Vyklický

23 February 2021	Žalgiris (Lithuania)	75–62	(Serbia) Crvena zvezda mts	Kaunas
19:00 (CET)	Scoring by quarter: 22–26, 18–18, 20–14, 15–4
	Pts: Grigonis 17; Rebs: Rubit 8 Asts: Walkup 7 PIR: Grigonis 24	Boxscore	Pts: Loyd, Simonović 16; Rebs: Dobrić, Kuzmić 5 Asts: Davidovac 5 PIR: Loyd 17	Arena: Žalgiris Arena; Attendance: 0 Referees: Mehdi Difallah, Emilio Pérez, Rain Peerandi

6 April 2021	Maccabi Tel Aviv (Israel)	92–62	(Russia) Khimki	Tel Aviv
18:30 (CET)	Scoring by quarter: 22–12, 31–13, 20–13, 19–24
	Pts: Wilbekin, Žižić 13; Rebs: Bender, Žižić 7 Asts: Dorsey 6 PIR: Žižić 20	Boxscore	Pts: Mickey 21; Rebs: Karasev 8 Asts: three players 3 PIR: Mickey 20	Arena: Menora Mivtachim Arena; Attendance: 3,000; Referees: Tomislav Hordov, Emilio Perez, Sebastien Clivaz

=== Round 25 ===
18 February 2021	Khimki (Russia)	67–89	(Spain) TD Systems Baskonia	Khimki
18:00 (CET)	Scoring by quarter: 14–24, 23–23, 20–24, 10–18
	Pts: Shved 16; Rebs: Shved 4 Asts: Shved 10; PIR: Shved 16	Boxscore	Pts: Fall 14; Rebs: Fall, Polonara 9 Asts: Henry 7 PIR: Fall 21	Arena: Mytishchi Arena; Attendance: 461; Referees: Tomislav Hordov, Spiros Gkontas, Huseyin Celik

18 February 2021	Anadolu Efes (Turkey)	76–53	(Greece) Olympiacos	Istanbul
18:30 (CET)	Scoring by quarter: 11–26, 32–8, 15–9, 18–10
	Pts: Larkin 21; Rebs: Dunston 7 Asts: Larkin 5 PIR: Larkin 32	Boxscore	Pts: Larentzakis 10; Rebs: Vezenkov 8 Asts: Larentzakis 8 PIR: Vezenkov 21	Arena: Sinan Erdem Dome; Attendance: 0 Referees: Robert Lottermoser, Mario Majkic, Uros Nikolic

18 February 2021	A|X Armani Exchange Milan (Italy)	87–68	(Israel) Maccabi Tel Aviv	Milan
20:45 (CET)	Scoring by quarter: 21–12, 18–15, 26–21, 22–20
	Pts: Punter 15; Rebs: Delaney 9 Asts: Rodríguez 9 PIR: Rodríguez 19	Boxscore	Pts: Hunter 16; Rebs: Hunter 9 Asts: Wilbekin 5 PIR: Hunter 25	Arena: Mediolanum Forum; Attendance: 0 Referees: Olegs Latisevs, Emilio Perez, Josip Radojkovic

18 February 2021	Barcelona (Spain)	86–62	(Lithuania) Žalgiris	Barcelona
21:00 (CET)	Scoring by quarter: 24–24, 24–13, 23–10, 15–15
	Pts: Higgins, Oriola 19; Rebs: Oriola 7 Asts: Bolmaro 6 PIR: Higgins, Oriola 27	Boxscore	Pts: Hayes 9 Rebs: Rubit 7 Asts: Grigonis, Walkup 4 PIR: Grigonis 10	Arena: Palau Blaugrana; Attendance: 0 Referees: Borys Ryzhyk, Piotr Pastusiak, Sergio Silva

19 February 2021	Fenerbahçe Beko (Turkey)	89–84	(Germany) ALBA Berlin	Istanbul
18:45 (CET)	Scoring by quarter: 24–22, 21–20, 22–18, 22–24
	Pts: De Colo 26; Rebs: Veselý 8 Asts: De Colo 8 PIR: De Colo 31	Boxscore	Pts: Eriksson 19; Rebs: Fontecchio 8 Asts: Lo 8 PIR: Lammers 23	Arena: Ülker Sports and Event Hall; Attendance: 100; Referees: Sreten Radovic, Carmelo Paternico, Rain Peerandi

19 February 2021	LDLC ASVEL (France)	87–79	(Germany) Bayern Munich	Villeurbanne
20:45 (CET)	Scoring by quarter: 21–18, 23–17, 22–17, 21–27
	Pts: Lighty 19; Rebs: M. Fall 9 Asts: Cole 5 PIR: M. Fall, Lighty 21	Boxscore	Pts: Baldwin 19; Rebs: Lučić 5 Asts: Baldwin 6 PIR: Lučić 23	Arena: Astroballe; Attendance: 0 Referees: Juan Carlos García, Gytis Vilius, Jordi Aliaga

19 February 2021	Crvena zvezda mts (Serbia)	75–76	(Russia) Zenit Saint Petersburg	Belgrade
20:45 (CET)	Scoring by quarter: 16–22, 20–26, 20–13, 19–15
	Pts: Loyd 21; Rebs: Kuzmić 9 Asts: Uskoković 6 PIR: Loyd 20	Boxscore	Pts: Pangos 25; Rebs: Gudaitis 6 Asts: Pangos 7 PIR: Pangos 25	Arena: Aleksandar Nikolić Hall; Attendance: 0 Referees: Christos Christodoulou, Robert Vyklický, Saulius Racys

19 February 2021	Valencia Basket (Spain)	89–78	(Spain) Real Madrid	Valencia
21:00 (CET)	Scoring by quarter: 29–21, 26–14, 16–17, 18–26
	Pts: Van Rossom 16; Rebs: Labeyrie 8 Asts: Van Rossom 8 PIR: Van Rossom 20	Boxscore	Pts: Carroll 20; Rebs: Tavares, Thompkins 9 Asts: Alocen, Tavares 3 PIR: Tavares 19	Arena: La Fonteta; Attendance: 0 Referees: Luigi Lamonica, Miloš Koljenšić, Marko Juras

14 April 2021	CSKA Moscow (Russia)	93–86	(Greece) Panathinaikos OPAP	Moscow
18:00 (CET)	Scoring by quarter: 27–19, 22–20, 25–22, 19–25
	Pts: Lundberg 19; Rebs: Shengelia 6 Asts: Lundberg, Strēlnieks 5 PIR: Clyburn, Lundberg 23	Boxscore	Pts: Papapetrou 15; Rebs: Papapetrou 5 Asts: Mack 7 PIR: Papapetrou 23	Arena: Megasport Arena; Attendance: 2,479; Referees: Juan Carlos Garcia, Robert Lottermoser, Milos Koljensic

=== Round 26 ===
25 February 2021	Zenit Saint Petersburg (Russia)	62–91	(Spain) Valencia Basket	Saint Petersburg
18:00 (CET)	Scoring by quarter: 19–22, 22–22, 9–18, 12–29
	Pts: Poythress 12; Rebs: Hollins 5 Asts: Ponitka, Zakharov 3 PIR: Poythress 14	Boxscore	Pts: Dubljević 19; Rebs: Dubljević 6 Asts: Kalinić 10; PIR: Kalinić 25	Arena: Sibur Arena; Attendance: 2,276; Referees: Sreten Radovic, Emin Mogulkoc, Gentian Cici

25 February 2021	Olympiacos (Greece)	74–75	(Russia) CSKA Moscow	Piraeus
20:00 (CET)	Scoring by quarter: 12–24, 14–20, 23–15, 25–16
	Pts: McKissic 24; Rebs: Vezenkov 7 Asts: Sloukas 4 PIR: McKissic 19	Boxscore	Pts: James 15; Rebs: Bolomboy 8 Asts: James 6 PIR: James 16	Arena: Peace and Friendship Stadium; Attendance: 0 Referees: Luigi Lamonica, Tomislav Hordov, Milos Koljensic

25 February 2021	Bayern Munich (Germany)	72–70	(Israel) Maccabi Tel Aviv	Munich
20:30 (CET)	Scoring by quarter: 18–21, 19–17, 14–20, 21–12
	Pts: Baldwin 16; Rebs: Weiler-Babb 6 Asts: Baldwin, Šiško 5 PIR: Baldwin 18	Boxscore	Pts: Žižić 18; Rebs: Žižić 10; Asts: Wilbekin 5 PIR: Žižić 24	Arena: Audi Dome; Attendance: 0 Referees: Christos Christodulou, Mario Majkic, Tomasz Trawicki

25 February 2021	A|X Armani Exchange Milan (Italy)	84–74	(Russia) Khimki	Milan
20:45 (CET)	Scoring by quarter: 29–26, 27–17, 14–13, 14–18
	Pts: Shields 17; Rebs: Hines 10; Asts: Delaney 7 PIR: Shields 24	Boxscore	Pts: Mickey 23; Rebs: Mickey 11; Asts: Zaytsev 5 PIR: Mickey 29	Arena: Mediolanum Forum; Attendance: 0 Referees: Ilija Belošević, Mehdi Difallah, Robert Vyklický

25 February 2021	Real Madrid (Spain)	70–58	(Lithuania) Žalgiris	Madrid
21:00 (CET)	Scoring by quarter: 21–13, 15–18, 15–11, 19–16
	Pts: Deck 14; Rebs: Tavares 9 Asts: Alocén 6 PIR: Deck 19	Boxscore	Pts: Jankūnas 13; Rebs: Jankūnas 7 Asts: Jokubaitis 4 PIR: Jankūnas 23	Arena: WiZink Center; Attendance: 0 Referees: Damir Javor, Milivoje Jovčić, Kristaps Konstantinovs

26 February 2021	Fenerbahçe Beko (Turkey)	74–106	(Turkey) Anadolu Efes	Istanbul
18:45 (CET)	Scoring by quarter: 11–24, 28–29, 19–28, 16–25
	Pts: De Colo 24; Rebs: Veselý 6 Asts: De Colo 5 PIR: De Colo 28	Boxscore	Pts: Micić 37; Rebs: Singleton 5 Asts: Simon 6 PIR: Micić 44	Arena: Ülker Sports and Event Hall; Attendance: 250; Referees: Miguel Ángel Pérez, Oļegs Latiševs, Anne Panther

26 February 2021	TD Systems Baskonia (Spain)	87–67	(Serbia) Crvena zvezda mts	Vitoria-Gasteiz
19:00 (CET)	Scoring by quarter: 21–16, 27–11, 18–21, 21–19
	Pts: Y. Fall 20; Rebs: Polonara 8 Asts: Henry 6 PIR: Y. Fall 23	Boxscore	Pts: Loyd 14; Rebs: Kuzmić 7 Asts: Loyd, Uskoković 3 PIR: Walden 14	Arena: Buesa Arena; Attendance: 0 Referees: Borys Ryzhyk, Carmelo Paternicò, Hugues Thépénier

26 February 2021	ALBA Berlin (Germany)	74–65	(Greece) Panathinaikos OPAP	Berlin
20:00 (CET)	Scoring by quarter: 11–17, 17–17, 22–19, 24–12
	Pts: Thiemann 16; Rebs: Sikma 6 Asts: Lô 7 PIR: Thiemann 18	Boxscore	Pts: White 14; Rebs: Mitoglou 9 Asts: Sant-Roos 5 PIR: White 17	Arena: Mercedes-Benz Arena; Attendance: 0 Referees: Juan Carlos García, Jakub Zamojski, Aare Halliko

26 February 2021	Barcelona (Spain)	69–76	(France) LDLC ASVEL	Barcelona
21:00 (CET)	Scoring by quarter: 15–19, 20–15, 19–20, 15–22
	Pts: Davies 22; Rebs: Davies 8 Asts: Calathes 5 PIR: Davies 29	Boxscore	Pts: Cole 21; Rebs: Howard, Yabusele 8 Asts: Cole 4 PIR: Howard 21	Arena: Palau Blaugrana; Attendance: 0 Referees: Robert Lottermoser, Uroš Nikolić, Michele Rossi

=== Round 27 ===
2 March 2021	Khimki (Russia)	78–77	(Spain) Real Madrid	Khimki
18:00 (CET)	Scoring by quarter: 17–18, 28–20, 17–24, 16–15
	Pts: McCollum, Shved 22; Rebs: Karasev, Mickey 6 Asts: Shved 8 PIR: Mickey 24	Boxscore	Pts: Carroll, Deck 15; Rebs: Tavares 11; Asts: Causeur 8 PIR: Deck 22	Arena: Mytishchi Arena; Attendance: 438; Referees: Christos Christodoulou, Milan Nedovic, Luka Kardum

2 March 2021	Zenit Saint Petersburg (Russia)	87–78	(Germany) ALBA Berlin	Saint Petersburg
18:00 (CET)	Scoring by quarter: 23–24, 20–24, 25–19, 19–4
	Pts: Pangos 19; Rebs: Poythress 7 Asts: Pangos 7 PIR: Pangos 26	Boxscore	Pts: Sikma 18; Rebs: Lammers, Sikma 6 Asts: Siva 5 PIR: Lammers 20	Arena: Sibur Arena; Attendance: 2,394; Referees: Olegs Latisevs, Uros Obrknezevic, Josip Radojkovic

2 March 2021	Anadolu Efes (Turkey)	99–83	(Spain) Valencia Basket	Istanbul
18:30 (CET)	Scoring by quarter: 18–23, 28–17, 22–18, 31–25
	Pts: Sanli 20; Rebs: Moerman 8 Asts: Larkin 6 PIR: Sanli 26	Boxscore	Pts: Dubljević 15; Rebs: Kalinić 9 Asts: Van Rossom 4 PIR: Dubljević 19	Arena: Sinan Erdem Dome; Attendance: 0 Referees: Mehdi Difallah, Carmelo Paternico, Tomislav Hordov

2 March 2021	Žalgiris (Lithuania)	85–75	(France) LDLC ASVEL	Kaunas
19:00 (CET)	Scoring by quarter: 17–20, 23–22, 27–15, 18–18
	Pts: Grigonis 21; Rebs: Jankūnas 9 Asts: Jokubaitis 5 PIR: Lauvergne 19	Boxscore	Pts: Yabusele 17; Rebs: M. Fall 7 Asts: Cole 5 PIR: Cole 20	Arena: Žalgiris Arena; Attendance: 0 Referees: Luigi Lamonica, Miloš Koljenšić, Ioannis Foufis

2 March 2021	Panathinaikos OPAP (Greece)	77–85	(Spain) Barcelona	Marousi
20:00 (CET)	Scoring by quarter: 17–26, 22–21, 11–12, 27–26
	Pts: Hezonja 21; Rebs: Papagiannis 5 Asts: Bentil 4 PIR: Hezonja 20	Boxscore	Pts: Mirotić 25; Rebs: Mirotić 5 Asts: three players 4 PIR: Mirotić 27	Arena: O.A.K.A. Attendance: 0 Referees: Matej Boltauzer, Anne Panther, Emin Mogulkoc

2 March 2021	Maccabi Tel Aviv (Israel)	80–84	(Russia) CSKA Moscow	Tel Aviv
20:05 (CET)	Scoring by quarter: 23–23, 10–28, 19–17, 28–16
	Pts: Dorsey 20; Rebs: Hunter 10; Asts: Jones 6 PIR: Hunter 26	Boxscore	Pts: Clyburn 21; Rebs: Eric 8 Asts: James 6 PIR: Clyburn 20	Arena: Menora Mivtachim Arena; Attendance: 300; Referees: Ilija Belošević, Gytis Vilius, Jordi Aliaga

2 March 2021	Crvena zvezda mts (Serbia)	76–78	(Germany) Bayern Munich	Belgrade
20:45 (CET)	Scoring by quarter: 10–15, 25–16, 22–19, 19–28
	Pts: Loyd 26; Rebs: Dobrić, Loyd 6 Asts: Uskoković 3 PIR: Loyd 24	Boxscore	Pts: Baldwin 27; Rebs: Johnson, Lučić 4 Asts: Seeley 4 PIR: Baldwin 23	Arena: Aleksandar Nikolić Hall; Attendance: 0 Referees: Juan Carlos García, Artūras Šukys, Sérgio Silva

3 March 2021	TD Systems Baskonia (Spain)	91–66	(Greece) Olympiacos	Vitoria-Gasteiz
19:00 (CET)	Scoring by quarter: 15–21, 28–11, 25–26, 23–8
	Pts: Vildoza 19; Rebs: Polonara 5 Asts: Henry, Vildoza 8 PIR: Vildoza 27	Boxscore	Pts: Jean-Charles 15; Rebs: Ellis, Vezenkov 9 Asts: Sloukas 7 PIR: Ellis 21	Arena: Buesa Arena; Attendance: 0 Referees: Damir Javor, Sašo Petek, Tomasz Trawicki

3 March 2021	A|X Armani Exchange Milan (Italy)	92–100	(Turkey) Fenerbahçe Beko	Milan
20:45 (CET)	Scoring by quarter: 28–24, 24–26, 17–28, 23–22
	Pts: Punter 20; Rebs: Datome 6 Asts: Shields 5 PIR: Datome 21	Boxscore	Pts: De Colo 20; Rebs: Veselý 10; Asts: Veselý 8 PIR: Veselý 35	Arena: Mediolanum Forum; Attendance: 0 Referees: Saša Pukl, Carlos Cortés, Joseph Bissang

=== Round 28 ===
4 March 2021	Zenit Saint Petersburg (Russia)	71–75	(Spain) Real Madrid	Saint Petersburg
18:00 (CET)	Scoring by quarter: 13–24, 16–14, 29–14, 13–23
	Pts: Pangos 14; Rebs: Ponitka 7 Asts: Pangos 7 PIR: Ponitka 18	Boxscore	Pts: Tavares 16; Rebs: Tavares 9 Asts: Alocén, Taylor 2 PIR: Tavares 19	Arena: Sibur Arena; Attendance: 3,134; Referees: Ilija Belosevic, Piotr Pastusiak, Mykola Ambrosov

4 March 2021	Anadolu Efes (Turkey)	100–70	(Russia) CSKA Moscow	Istanbul
18:30 (CET)	Scoring by quarter: 31–13, 24–15, 20–17, 25–25
	Pts: Micić 21; Rebs: Moerman 7 Asts: Micić 8 PIR: Micić 29	Boxscore	Pts: Shengelia 14; Rebs: Clyburn 6 Asts: James 8 PIR: Voigtmann 11	Arena: Sinan Erdem Dome; Attendance: 0 Referees: Saša Pukl, Juan Carlos García, Joseph Bissang

4 March 2021	Maccabi Tel Aviv (Israel)	84–72	(Spain) Valencia Basket	Tel Aviv
20:05 (CET)	Scoring by quarter: 14–18, 19–17, 29–21, 22–16
	Pts: Dorsey 17; Rebs: Žižić 6 Asts: Caloiaro, Wilbekin 4 PIR: Dorsey 24	Boxscore	Pts: Labeyrie 18; Rebs: Dubljević 9 Asts: Dubljević, Hermannsson 4 PIR: Labeyrie 21	Arena: Menora Mivtachim Arena; Attendance: 300; Referees: Milivoje Jovčić, Fernando Rocha, Hugues Thépénier

4 March 2021	Bayern Munich (Germany)	76–71	(Greece) Panathinaikos OPAP	Munich
20:30 (CET)	Scoring by quarter: 14–21, 23–15, 20–19, 19–16
	Pts: Baldwin 27; Rebs: Gist 5 Asts: Baldwin 6 PIR: Baldwin 34	Boxscore	Pts: Hezonja 14; Rebs: Bentil, White 8 Asts: Sant-Roos 4 PIR: Hezonja 14	Arena: Audi Dome; Attendance: 0 Referees: Miguel Ángel Pérez, Mehdi Difallah, Saulius Racys

5 March 2021	Khimki (Russia)	81–100	(Germany) ALBA Berlin	Khimki
18:00 (CET)	Scoring by quarter: 25–20, 22–21, 20–27, 14–32
	Pts: Mickey 29; Rebs: Mickey 9 Asts: Shved 12; PIR: Mickey 31	Boxscore	Pts: Eriksson 36; Rebs: Sikma 8 Asts: Lo, Siva 9 PIR: Eriksson 41	Arena: Mytishchi Arena; Attendance: 937; Referees: Borys Ryzhyk, Elias Koromilas, Milos Koljensic

5 March 2021	Žalgiris (Lithuania)	64–69	(Italy) A|X Armani Exchange Milan	Kaunas
19:00 (CET)	Scoring by quarter: 13–19, 19–15, 13–16, 19–19
	Pts: Grigonis 17; Rebs: Lauvergne 9 Asts: Walkup 4 PIR: Lauvergne 24	Boxscore	Pts: Shields 23; Rebs: Hines 7 Asts: Punter 4 PIR: Shields 27	Arena: Žalgiris Arena; Attendance: 0 Referees: Christos Christodoulou, Milan Nedovic, Marcin Kowalski

5 March 2021	Olympiacos (Greece)	94–79	(Serbia) Crvena zvezda mts	Piraeus
20:00 (CET)	Scoring by quarter: 30–19, 23–29, 22–19, 19–12
	Pts: McKissic 20; Rebs: Ellis 7 Asts: Sloukas, Spanoulis 7 PIR: Vezenkov 26	Boxscore	Pts: Simonović 19; Rebs: Lazić 5 Asts: Hall 7 PIR: Simonović 14	Arena: Peace and Friendship Stadium; Attendance: 0 Referees: Daniel Hierrezuelo, Jakub Zamojski, Sinan Isguder

5 March 2021	LDLC ASVEL (France)	86–90	(Turkey) Fenerbahçe Beko	Villeurbanne
20:45 (CET)	Scoring by quarter: 18–20, 20–20, 22–19, 26–31
	Pts: Lighty 15; Rebs: Bako 5 Asts: Cole 4 PIR: Bako 19	Boxscore	Pts: De Colo 24; Rebs: three players 4 Asts: De Colo 6 PIR: De Colo 27	Arena: Astroballe; Attendance: 0 Referees: Matej Boltauzer, Tomislav Hordov, Ingus Baumanis

5 March 2021	Barcelona (Spain)	71–57	(Spain) TD Systems Baskonia	Barcelona
20:45 (CET)	Scoring by quarter: 25–4, 8–22, 17–19, 21–12
	Pts: Mirotić 18; Rebs: Mirotić 10; Asts: Calathes, Higgins 4 PIR: Mirotić 26	Boxscore	Pts: Y. Fall 12; Rebs: Jekiri, Polonara 6 Asts: Henry 8 PIR: Polonara 14	Arena: Palau Blaugrana; Attendance: 0 Referees: Luigi Lamonica, Sreten Radović, Mario Majkić

=== Round 29 ===
11 March 2021	CSKA Moscow (Russia)	76–84	(Italy) A|X Armani Exchange Milan	Moscow
18:00 (CET)	Scoring by quarter: 10–30, 24–17, 21–23, 21–14
	Pts: James 21; Rebs: Shengelia 10; Asts: James 5 PIR: Shengelia 33	Boxscore	Pts: Punter 32; Rebs: Hines 6 Asts: Rodríguez 6 PIR: Punter 28	Arena: Megasport Arena; Attendance: 4,297; Referees: Olegs Latisevs, Miguel Angel Perez, Tomasz Trawicki

11 March 2021	Panathinaikos OPAP (Greece)	81–63	(Israel) Maccabi Tel Aviv	Marousi
20:00 (CET)	Scoring by quarter: 25–9, 18–21, 15–25, 23–8
	Pts: Papapetrou 20; Rebs: Mitoglou 8 Asts: Sant-Roos 6 PIR: Mitoglou 23	Boxscore	Pts: Wilbekin 14; Rebs: Žižić 8 Asts: Caloiaro, DiBartolomeo 3 PIR: Žižić 14	Arena: O.A.K.A. Attendance: 0 Referees: Sreten Radovic, Damir Javor, Sergio Silva

11 March 2021	Crvena zvezda mts (Serbia)	92–81	(Russia) Khimki	Belgrade
20:45 (CET)	Scoring by quarter: 8–15, 26–23, 28–22, 30–21
	Pts: Loyd 22; Rebs: Loyd 4 Asts: Loyd 6 PIR: Loyd 27	Boxscore	Pts: McCollum 29; Rebs: McCollum, Mickey 7 Asts: McCollum 6 PIR: McCollum 33	Arena: Aleksandar Nikolić Hall; Attendance: 0 Referees: Anne Panther, Emilio Perez, Robert Vyklicky

11 March 2021	LDLC ASVEL (France)	89–95	(Germany) ALBA Berlin	Villeurbanne
20:45 (CET)	Scoring by quarter: 30–23, 22–20, 21–27, 16–25
	Pts: Yabusele 20; Rebs: Bako, Fall 5 Asts: Howard 6 PIR: Yabusele 20	Boxscore	Pts: Siva 21; Rebs: Thiemann 6 Asts: Sikma, Siva 5 PIR: Siva 28	Arena: Astroballe; Attendance: 0 Referees: Christos Christodoulou, Piotr Pastusiak, Saulius Racys

11 March 2021	Real Madrid (Spain)	76–81	(Spain) Barcelona	Madrid
21:00 (CET)	Scoring by quarter: 19–24, 19–17, 16–16, 22–24
	Pts: Deck 17; Rebs: Tavares 11; Asts: Abalde 4 PIR: Tavares 29	Boxscore	Pts: Oriola 18; Rebs: Oriola 6 Asts: Higgins, Mirotić 5 PIR: Mirotić 24	Arena: WiZink Center; Attendance: 0 Referees: Borys Ryzhyk, Carmelo Paternico, Saso Patek

12 March 2021	Anadolu Efes (Turkey)	89–62	(Lithuania) Žalgiris	Istanbul
18:30 (CET)	Scoring by quarter: 26–12, 23–16, 27–20, 13–14
	Pts: Larkin 18; Rebs: Dunston, Simon 5 Asts: three players 4 PIR: Micić 25	Boxscore	Pts: Walkup 15; Rebs: Jankūnas, Rubit 8 Asts: Walkup 8 PIR: Rubit 17	Arena: Sinan Erdem Dome; Attendance: 0 Referees: Matej Boltauzer, Ilija Belosevic, Spiros Gkontas

12 March 2021	TD Systems Baskonia (Spain)	78–71	(Germany) Bayern Munich	Vitoria-Gasteiz
19:00 (CET)	Scoring by quarter: 17–15, 16–18, 27–12, 18–26
	Pts: three players 15; Rebs: Jekiri 9 Asts: Henry 10; PIR: Jekiri 27	Boxscore	Pts: Reynolds 18; Rebs: Reynolds 10; Asts: Reynolds 7 PIR: Reynolds 34	Arena: Buesa Arena; Attendance: 0 Referees: Sasa Pukl, Tomislab Hordov, Uros Nikolic

12 March 2021	Olympiacos (Greece)	75–61	(Russia) Zenit Saint Petersburg	Piraeus
20:00 (CET)	Scoring by quarter: 15–28, 15–13, 24–15, 21–5
	Pts: Spanoulis 16; Rebs: Vezenkov 6 Asts: Sloukas 6 PIR: Vezenkov 16	Boxscore	Pts: Pangos 20; Rebs: Ponitka 11; Asts: Pangos 7 PIR: Pangos, Ponitka 16	Arena: Peace and Friendship Stadium; Attendance: 0 Referees: Robert Lottermoser, Fernando Rocha, Hugues Thepenier

12 March 2021	Valencia Basket (Spain)	66–52	(Turkey) Fenerbahçe Beko	Valencia
21:00 (CET)	Scoring by quarter: 18–10, 19–18, 8–11, 21–13
	Pts: Van Rossom 17; Rebs: Dubljević 7 Asts: Kalinić 5 PIR: Van Rossom 26	Boxscore	Pts: Veselý 15; Rebs: De Colo 6 Asts: Brown, De Colo 4 PIR: Veselý 19	Arena: La Fonteta; Attendance: 0 Referees: Luigi Lamonica, Elias Koromilas, Gytis Vilius

=== Round 30 ===
18 March 2021	Zenit Saint Petersburg (Russia)	75–79	(Spain) TD Systems Baskonia	Saint Petersburg
18:00 (CET)	Scoring by quarter: 14–17, 31–15, 14–13, 16–34
	Pts: Ponitka 15; Rebs: Ponitka, Zubkov 5 Asts: Pangos 8 PIR: Ponitka 18	Boxscore	Pts: Peters 17; Rebs: Polonara 7 Asts: Henry 4 PIR: Peters 22	Arena: Yubileyny Sports Palace; Attendance: 2553; Referees: Christos Christodoulou, Joseph Bissang, Sinan Isguder

18 March 2021	Fenerbahçe Beko (Turkey)	84–61	(Lithuania) Žalgiris	Istanbul
18:45 (CET)	Scoring by quarter: 28–18, 17–8, 21–20, 18–15
	Pts: Veselý 21; Rebs: Veselý 10; Asts: De Colo 6 PIR: Veselý 32	Boxscore	Pts: Lekavičius 12; Rebs: Jankūnas 7 Asts: Grigonis 8 PIR: Grigonis 15	Arena: Ülker Sports and Event Hall; Attendance: 250; Referees: Miguel Ángel Pérez, Milivoje Jovčić, Mario Majkić

18 March 2021	ALBA Berlin (Germany)	80–84	(Greece) Olympiacos	Berlin
20:30 (CET)	Scoring by quarter: 18–16, 24–21, 20–25, 18–22
	Pts: Siva 14; Rebs: Sikma 10; Asts: Siva 7 PIR: Sikma 24	Boxscore	Pts: Vezenkov 31; Rebs: Vezenkov 10; Asts: Sloukas 6 PIR: Vezenkov 41	Arena: Mercedes-Benz Arena; Attendance: 0 Referees: Luigi Lamonica, Rain Peerandi, Mykola Ambrosov

18 March 2021	Real Madrid (Spain)	89–96	(Russia) CSKA Moscow	Madrid
21:00 (CET)	Scoring by quarter: 21–23, 20–32, 26–19, 22–22
	Pts: Thompkins 20; Rebs: Tavares 13; Asts: Tavares 6 PIR: Tavares 31	Boxscore	Pts: Clyburn 23; Rebs: Voigtmann 9 Asts: James 4 PIR: Clyburn 30	Arena: WiZink Center; Attendance: 0 Referees: Robert Lottermoser, Matej Boltauzer, Mehdi Difallah

19 March 2021	Khimki (Russia)	68–77	(Spain) Valencia Basket	Khimki
18:00 (CET)	Scoring by quarter: 17–27, 21–17, 11–14, 19–19
	Pts: Mickey 20; Rebs: Monia 8 Asts: McCollum 5 PIR: Mickey 19	Boxscore	Pts: Williams 18; Rebs: Tobey 9 Asts: Hermannsson 8 PIR: Tobey 19	Arena: Mytishchi Arena; Attendance: 1,314; Referees: Saša Pukl, Uroš Obrknežević, Kristaps Konstantinovs

19 March 2021	Panathinaikos OPAP (Greece)	82–86	(Serbia) Crvena zvezda mts	Marousi
20:00 (CET)	Scoring by quarter: 23–17, 17–23, 19–20, 23–26
	Pts: Sant-Roos 21; Rebs: Papagiannis 8 Asts: Papapetrou, Sant-Roos 4 PIR: Sant-Roos 26	Boxscore	Pts: Loyd 27; Rebs: Kuzmić, Simonović 5 Asts: Loyd 5 PIR: Loyd 30	Arena: O.A.K.A. Attendance: 0 Referees: Borys Ryzhyk, Michele Rossi, Jordi Aliaga

19 March 2021	Bayern Munich (Germany)	80–79	(Turkey) Anadolu Efes	Munich
20:30 (CET)	Scoring by quarter: 18–23, 19–23, 22–17, 21–16
	Pts: Lučić 18; Rebs: Reynolds 9 Asts: Seeley, Weiler-Babb 4 PIR: Reynolds 22	Boxscore	Pts: Micić 19; Rebs: three players 4 Asts: Larkin 4 PIR: Micić 19	Arena: Audi Dome; Attendance: 0 Referees: Olegs Latisevs, Emilio Perez, Milos Klojensic

19 March 2021	A|X Armani Exchange Milan (Italy)	56–72	(Spain) Barcelona	Milan
20:45 (CET)	Scoring by quarter: 12–15, 17–23, 15–17, 12–17
	Pts: Shields 10; Rebs: Brooks 5 Asts: Rodríguez 5 PIR: Shields 10	Boxscore	Pts: Mirotić 15; Rebs: Oriola 7 Asts: Calathes 11; PIR: Mirotić 22	Arena: Mediolanum Forum; Attendance: 0 Referees: Ilija Belosevic, Damir Javor, Tomislav Hordov

4 April 2021	Maccabi Tel Aviv (Israel)	67–74	(France) LDLC ASVEL	Tel Aviv
20:05 (CET)	Scoring by quarter: 22–14, 12–23, 14–20, 19–17
	Pts: Bender 15; Rebs: Bender, Žižić 8 Asts: Bryant 3 PIR: Bender 21	Boxscore	Pts: Cole 17; Rebs: Yabusele 10; Asts: Cole, Fall 4 PIR: Bako 16	Arena: Menora Mivtachim Arena; Attendance: 3,000; Referees: Borys Ryzhyk, Jakub Zamojski, Hüseyin Çelik

=== Round 31 ===
25 March 2021	CSKA Moscow (Russia)	87–72	(Serbia) Crvena zvezda mts	Moscow
18:00 (CET)	Scoring by quarter: 31–19, 19–20, 21–20, 16–13
	Pts: Shengelia 16; Rebs: Eric 8 Asts: James 4 PIR: Hackett 24	Boxscore	Pts: Davidovac 20; Rebs: Nnoko 10; Asts: Davidovac, Walden 3 PIR: Davidovac 21	Arena: Megasport Arena; Attendance: 4,402; Referees: Fernando Rocha, Elias Koromilas, Michele Rossi

25 March 2021	Anadolu Efes (Turkey)	85–65	(Greece) Panathinaikos	Istanbul
18:30 (CET)	Scoring by quarter: 24–21, 19–12, 17–16, 25–16
	Pts: Micić 21; Rebs: Beaubois 6 Asts: Micić 7 PIR: Micić 30	Boxscore	Pts: Hezonja 14; Rebs: Papagiannis 6 Asts: Sant-Roos 7 PIR: Mitoglou 13	Arena: Sinan Erdem Dome; Attendance: 0 Referees: Robert Lottermoser, Sašo Petek, Josip Radojković

25 March 2021	Žalgiris (Lithuania)	81–88	(Israel) Maccabi Tel Aviv	Kaunas
20:00 (CET)	Scoring by quarter: 26–18, 14–20, 23–26, 18–24
	Pts: Hayes 24; Rebs: Lauvergne 9 Asts: Grigonis 6 PIR: Hayes 30	Boxscore	Pts: Bender 16; Rebs: Casspi 8 Asts: Jones 6 PIR: Jones 21	Arena: Žalgiris Arena; Attendance: 0 Referees: Luigi Lamonica, Anne Panther, Piotr Pastusiak

25 March 2021	LDLC ASVEL (France)	71–74	(Spain) Real Madrid	Villeurbanne
20:45 (CET)	Scoring by quarter: 23–20, 14–12, 14–24, 20–18
	Pts: Cole 18; Rebs: Fall 11; Asts: Diot 5 PIR: Fall 19	Boxscore	Pts: Thompkins 13; Rebs: Garuba 8 Asts: Garuba 3 PIR: Abalde 14	Arena: Astroballe; Attendance: 0 Referees: Saša Pukl, Rain Peerandi, Sebastien Clivaz

25 March 2021	Valencia Basket (Spain)	83–76	(Germany) Bayern Munich	Valencia
21:00 (CET)	Scoring by quarter: 26–19, 20–14, 12–30, 25–13
	Pts: Tobey 18; Rebs: Williams 7 Asts: Van Rossom 9 PIR: Tobey 22	Boxscore	Pts: Lučić 20; Rebs: Lučić 7 Asts: Weiler-Babb 5 PIR: Lučić 24	Arena: Fuente de San Luis; Attendance: 0 Referees: Borys Ryzhyk, Mario Majkić, Artūras Šukys

26 March 2021	Khimki (Russia)	70–91	(Russia) Zenit Saint Petersburg	Khimki
18:00 (CET)	Scoring by quarter: 11–14, 18–25, 18–27, 23–25
	Pts: Mickey 23; Rebs: Mickey 5 Asts: Shved 3 PIR: Mickey 28	Boxscore	Pts: Hollins 17; Rebs: Ponitka, Thomas 5 Asts: Pangos 6 PIR: Hollins, Pangos 18	Arena: Mytishchi Arena; Attendance: 1,333; Referees: Sreten Radović, Marcin Kowalski, Ioannis Foufis

26 March 2021	TD Systems Baskonia (Spain)	86–69	(Italy) A|X Armani Exchange Milan	Vitoria-Gasteiz
19:00 (CET)	Scoring by quarter: 10–16, 23–16, 27–13, 26–24
	Pts: Henry 19; Rebs: Polonara 13; Asts: Henry 6 PIR: Polonara 28	Boxscore	Pts: Punter 13; Rebs: Brooks 7 Asts: Rodríguez 4 PIR: Brooks 16	Arena: Fernando Buesa Arena; Attendance: 0 Referees: Matej Boltauzer, Emin Moğulkoç, Sergio Silva

26 March 2021	Olympiacos (Greece)	71–76	(Turkey) Fenerbahçe Beko	Piraeus
20:00 (CET)	Scoring by quarter: 11–20, 16–23, 22–15, 22–18
	Pts: Jean-Charles 16; Rebs: Jean-Charles 8 Asts: Sloukas 5 PIR: Jean-Charles 22	Boxscore	Pts: Veselý 18; Rebs: De Colo 7 Asts: De Colo, Pierre 4 PIR: Veselý 23	Arena: Peace and Friendship Stadium; Attendance: 0 Referees: Ilija Belošević, Carlos Cortés, Jurgis Laurinavičius

26 March 2021	Barcelona (Spain)	80–67	(Germany) ALBA Berlin	Barcelona
21:00 (CET)	Scoring by quarter: 22–23, 23–17, 17–18, 18–9
	Pts: Mirotić 26; Rebs: Mirotić 7 Asts: Calathes 11; PIR: Mirotić 28	Boxscore	Pts: Sikma 9 Rebs: Sikma 6 Asts: Granger 3 PIR: Giffey 14	Arena: Palau Blaugrana; Attendance: 0 Referees: Oļegs Latiševs, Joseph Bissang, Luka Kardum

=== Round 32 ===
30 March 2021	Zenit Saint Petersburg (Russia)	74–86	(Russia) CSKA Moscow	Saint Petersburg
19:00 (CET)	Scoring by quarter: 18–22, 24–26, 15–15, 17–23
	Pts: Baron 24; Rebs: Ponitka 8 Asts: Pangos 8 PIR: Baron 20	Boxscore	Pts: Voigtmann 21; Rebs: Clyburn, Eric 6 Asts: three players 3 PIR: Voigtmann 31	Arena: Sibur Arena; Attendance: 4,152; Referees: Daniel Hierrenzuelo, Gytis Vilius, Uroš Nikolić

30 March 2021	Real Madrid (Spain)	83–108	(Turkey) Anadolu Efes	Madrid
19:00 (CET)	Scoring by quarter: 20–20, 22–21, 22–35, 19–32
	Pts: Thompkins 19; Rebs: Garuba 6 Asts: Garuba, Laprovíttola 4 PIR: Garuba, Thompkins 20	Boxscore	Pts: Sanli 17; Rebs: Singleton 6 Asts: Micić 6 PIR: Simon 21	Arena: WiZink Center; Attendance: 0 Referees: Christos Christodoulou, Tomislav Hordov, Tomasz Trawicki

30 March 2021	Crvena zvezda mts (Serbia)	72–93	(Italy) A|X Armani Exchange Milan	Belgrade
19:00 (CET)	Scoring by quarter: 12–22, 24–25, 15–28, 21–18
	Pts: Loyd 22; Rebs: Davidovac 6 Asts: Loyd 3 PIR: Loyd 23	Boxscore	Pts: Punter 23; Rebs: LeDay 5 Asts: Rodríguez 8 PIR: Punter 23	Arena: Aleksandar Nikolić Hall; Attendance: 0 Referees: Robert Lottermoser, Juan Carlos García, Artem Lavrukhin

30 March 2021	Žalgiris (Lithuania)	96–86	(Germany) ALBA Berlin	Kaunas
19:00 (CET)	Scoring by quarter: 21–23, 20–28, 27–10, 28–25
	Pts: Lekavičius 21; Rebs: Jankūnas 8 Asts: Lekavičius, Walkup 5 PIR: Geben 23	Boxscore	Pts: Eriksson 19; Rebs: Koumadje 5 Asts: Siva 6 PIR: Siva 21	Arena: Žalgiris Arena; Attendance: 0 Referees: Damir Javor, Seffi Shemmesh, Aare Halliko

30 March 2021	Panathinaikos (Greece)	82–97	(Spain) TD Systems Baskonia	Marousi
21:00 (CET)	Scoring by quarter: 21–25, 20–24, 18–23, 23–25
	Pts: Mitoglou 22; Rebs: Mitoglou 8 Asts: three players 3 PIR: Mitoglou 28	Boxscore	Pts: Giedraitis 25; Rebs: Polonara 11; Asts: Henry 10; PIR: Polonara 36	Arena: O.A.K.A. Attendance: 0 Referees: Ilija Belošević, Carmelo Paternico, Milan Nedović

30 March 2021	Maccabi Tel Aviv (Israel)	99–94(OT)	(Spain) Barcelona	Tel Aviv
20:05 (CET)	Scoring by quarter: 19–14, 20–24, 26–21, 15–21, Overtime: 19–14
	Pts: Žižić 24; Rebs: Žižić 8 Asts: Jones 8 PIR: Žižić 33	Boxscore	Pts: Mirotić 23; Rebs: Mirotić 10; Asts: Calathes 5 PIR: Mirotić 34	Arena: Menora Mivtachim Arena; Attendance: 3,000; Referees: Matej Boltauzer, Mehdi Difallah, Fernando Rocha

30 March 2021	Bayern Munich (Germany)	68–77	(Turkey) Fenerbahçe Beko	Munich
21:00 (CET)	Scoring by quarter: 15–18, 19–17, 10–18, 24–24
	Pts: Baldwin 20; Rebs: Baldwin, Lučić 7 Asts: Šiško 7 PIR: Baldwin 19	Boxscore	Pts: De Colo 21; Rebs: three players 6 Asts: Veselý 5 PIR: De Colo 27	Arena: Audi Dome; Attendance: 3,000; Referees: Sreten Radović, Piotr Pastusiak, Amit Balak

31 March 2021	Khimki (Russia)	87–85(OT)	(France) LDLC ASVEL	Khimki
19:00 (CET)	Scoring by quarter: 20–22, 22–9, 20–19, 13–25, Overtime: 12–10
	Pts: Shved 32; Rebs: Mickey 9 Asts: Ponkrashov 7 PIR: Mickey 36	Boxscore	Pts: Yabusele 24; Rebs: Yabusele 10; Asts: Cole 9 PIR: Yabusele 37	Arena: Mytishchi Arena; Attendance: 878; Referees: Daniel Hierrenzuelo, Emin Moğulkoç, Josip Radojković

31 March 2021	Valencia Basket (Spain)	79–88	(Greece) Olympiacos	Valencia
21:00 (CET)	Scoring by quarter: 19–23, 12–21, 10–30, 38–14
	Pts: Prepelič 12; Rebs: Tobey 9 Asts: Kalinić, Vives 4 PIR: San Emeterio 15	Boxscore	Pts: Vezenkov 19; Rebs: Printezis, Vezenkov 6 Asts: Sloukas 11; PIR: Printezis 23	Arena: La Fonteta; Attendance: 0 Referees: Oļegs Latiševs, Jakub Zamojksi, Robert Vyklický

=== Round 33 ===
1 April 2021	TD Systems Baskonia (Spain)	101–111(OT)	(Turkey) Anadolu Efes	Vitoria-Gasteiz
19:00 (CET)	Scoring by quarter: 19–22, 22–24, 22–19, 29–27, Overtime: 9–19
	Pts: Polonara 23; Rebs: Peters 9 Asts: Henry 8 PIR: Polonara 26	Boxscore	Pts: Larkin 30; Rebs: Moerman, Singleton 8 Asts: Simon 6 PIR: Larkin 30	Arena: Buesa Arena; Attendance: 0 Referees: Damir Javor, Piotr Pastusiak, Anne Panther

1 April 2021	Panathinaikos OPAP (Greece)	86–83(OT)	(Italy) A|X Armani Exchange Milan	Marousi
20:00 (CET)	Scoring by quarter: 15–26, 14–20, 20–13, 21–11, Overtime: 16–13
	Pts: Hezonja 17; Rebs: Papagiannis 7 Asts: Mack 4 PIR: Papagiannis 21	Boxscore	Pts: Micov 15; Rebs: Tarczewski 6 Asts: Rodríguez 5 PIR: Micov 20	Arena: O.A.K.A. Attendance: 0 Referees: Sreten Radović, Fernando Rocha, Saulius Racys

1 April 2021	Bayern Munich (Germany)	71–70	(Lithuania) Žalgiris	Munich
20:30 (CET)	Scoring by quarter: 21–22, 16–14, 20–18, 14–16
	Pts: Lučić 13; Rebs: Lučić 6 Asts: Šiško 6 PIR: Lučić 18	Boxscore	Pts: Walkup 16; Rebs: Hayes, Lauvergne 6 Asts: Grigonis, Lekavičius 5 PIR: Walkup 26	Arena: Audi Dome; Attendance: 0 Referees: Ilija Belošević, Sašo Petek, Carlos Cortes

1 April 2021	Crvena zvezda mts (Serbia)	76–64	(Israel) Maccabi Tel Aviv	Belgrade
20:45 (CET)	Scoring by quarter: 15–21, 18–13, 20–11, 23–19
	Pts: Loyd 21; Rebs: Nnoko, Simonović 11; Asts: Loyd 4 PIR: Loyd 23	Boxscore	Pts: Dorsey 14; Rebs: Žižić 6 Asts: Jones 5 PIR: Dorsey 16	Arena: Aleksandar Nikolić Hall; Attendance: 0 Referees: Miguel Ángel Pérez, Gytis Vilius, Marcin Kowalski

1 April 2021	ALBA Berlin (Germany)	86–90	(Spain) Valencia Basket	Berlin
20:45 (CET)	Scoring by quarter: 26–13, 27–29, 17–22, 16–26
	Pts: Eriksson 17; Rebs: Sikma 9 Asts: Siva 9 PIR: Eriksson 20	Boxscore	Pts: Prepelič 24; Rebs: Dubljević 8 Asts: Prepelič 7 PIR: Prepelič 29	Arena: Mercedes-Benz Arena; Attendance: 0 Referees: Emin Moğulkoç, Amit Balak, Jurgis Laurinavičius

2 April 2021	CSKA Moscow (Russia)	97–72	(Russia) Khimki	Moscow
19:00 (CET)	Scoring by quarter: 21–17, 26–17, 29–13, 21–25
	Pts: Lundberg, Voigtmann 16; Rebs: Voigtmann 9 Asts: Hackett 5 PIR: Voigtmann 22	Boxscore	Pts: Mickey 16; Rebs: Mickey 7 Asts: Monia, Zaytsev 3 PIR: Mickey 24	Arena: Megasport Arena; Attendance: 3,261; Referees: Oļegs Latiševs, Milivoje Jovčić, Hugues Thepenier

2 April 2021	Zenit Saint Petersburg (Russia)	87–53	(France) LDLC ASVEL	Saint Petersburg
19:00 (CET)	Scoring by quarter: 20–15, 21–22, 25–6, 21–10
	Pts: Baron, Hollins 15; Rebs: Ponitka 7 Asts: Pangos 8 PIR: Thomas 18	Boxscore	Pts: Lighty 12; Rebs: Kahudi, Noua 4 Asts: Diot 4 PIR: Howard 11	Arena: Sibur Arena; Attendance: 3,195; Referees: Juan Carlos García, Spiros Gkontas, Luka Kardum

2 April 2021	Fenerbahçe Beko (Turkey)	73–82	(Spain) Barcelona	Istanbul
19:45 (CET)	Scoring by quarter: 25–26, 17–21, 16–15, 15–20
	Pts: Gudurić 19; Rebs: Barthel 6 Asts: De Colo 6 PIR: Gudurić 21	Boxscore	Pts: Kuric 16; Rebs: Davies 9 Asts: three players 4 PIR: Kuric 18	Arena: Ülker Sports and Event Hall; Attendance: 250; Referees: Robert Lottermoser, Elias Koromilas, Rain Peerandi

2 April 2021	Real Madrid (Spain)	72–63	(Greece) Olympiacos	Madrid
21:00 (CET)	Scoring by quarter: 20–11, 16–15, 17–12, 19–25
	Pts: Deck 18; Rebs: Tavares 8 Asts: Abalde 4 PIR: Deck 28	Boxscore	Pts: Vezenkov 22; Rebs: Jean-Charles, Koufos 7 Asts: Sloukas 5 PIR: Vezenkov 24	Arena: WiZink Center; Attendance: 0 Referees: Borys Ryzhyk, Milan Nedović, Uroš Nikolić

=== Round 34 ===
8 April 2021	CSKA Moscow (Russia)	88–70	(France) LDLC ASVEL	Moscow
19:00 (CET)	Scoring by quarter: 18–15, 24–21, 16–24, 30–10
	Pts: Lundberg 23; Rebs: Tavares 8 Asts: Eric 9 PIR: Lundberg 30	Boxscore	Pts: Yabusele 23; Rebs: Bako, Yabusele 4 Asts: Cole 4 PIR: Yabusele 26	Arena: Megasport Arena; Attendance: 2,722; Referees: Matej Boltauzer, Carmelo Paternico, Carlos Peruga

8 April 2021	Žalgiris (Lithuania)	93–78	(Greece) Panathinaikos OPAP	Kaunas
19:00 (CET)	Scoring by quarter: 27–14, 25–33, 22–13, 19–18
	Pts: Lekavičius 20; Rebs: Jankūnas 7 Asts: Grigonis, Walkup 5 PIR: Walkup 29	Boxscore	Pts: Nedović 17; Rebs: Mitoglou 7 Asts: Mack 6 PIR: Nedović 21	Arena: Žalgiris Arena; Attendance: 0 Referees: Daniel Hierrenzuelo, Tomislav Hordov, Artem Lavukhin

8 April 2021	Fenerbahçe Beko (Turkey)	67–93	(Spain) Real Madrid	Istanbul
19:45 (CET)	Scoring by quarter: 11–23, 25–26, 21–18, 10–26
	Pts: De Colo 23; Rebs: De Colo, O’Quinn 5 Asts: O’Quinn, Pierre 2 PIR: De Colo 27	Boxscore	Pts: Causeur 20; Rebs: Thompkins 9 Asts: Laprovíttola 10; PIR: Laprovíttola 29	Arena: Ülker Sports and Event Hall; Attendance: 350; Referees: Luigi Lamonica, Anne Panther, Mario Majkic

8 April 2021	ALBA Berlin (Germany)	81–58	(Serbia) Crvena zvezda mts	Berlin
20:00 (CET)	Scoring by quarter: 24–22, 25–8, 17–16, 15–12
	Pts: Siva 17; Rebs: Fontecchio 6 Asts: Granger, Siva 8 PIR: Siva 21	Boxscore	Pts: Simonović 12; Rebs: Nnoko 11; Asts: Lazić, Uskoković 3 PIR: Kuzmić, Nnoko 12	Arena: Mercedes-Benz Arena; Attendance: 0 Referees: Borys Ryzhyk, Emilio Perez, Mehdi Difallah

8 April 2021	Valencia Basket (Spain)	86–81	(Spain) TD Systems Baskonia	Valencia
21:00 (CET)	Scoring by quarter: 25–21, 14–23, 21–15, 26–22
	Pts: Williams 16; Rebs: Dubljevic, Tobey 7 Asts: Dubljević 5 PIR: Williams 25	Boxscore	Pts: Henry 19; Rebs: Sedekerskis 7 Asts: Henry 7 PIR: Henry 22	Arena: La Fonteta; Attendance: 0 Referees: Saša Pukl, Sreten Radović, Joseph Bissang

9 April 2021	Zenit Saint Petersburg (Russia)	86–69	(Israel) Maccabi Tel Aviv	Saint Petersburg
19:00 (CET)	Scoring by quarter: 25–15, 19–22, 22–11, 20–21
	Pts: Hollins 15; Rebs: Ponitka, Poythress 5 Asts: Pangos 6 PIR: Black 21	Boxscore	Pts: Dorsey 15; Rebs: Bender, Hunter 4 Asts: Wilbekin 4 PIR: Dorsey 12	Arena: Yubileyny Sports Palace; Attendance: 3,532; Referees: Robert Lottermoser, Sašo Petek, Saulius Racys

9 April 2021	Olympiacos (Greece)	82–75	(Russia) Khimki	Piraeus
20:00 (CET)	Scoring by quarter: 24–18, 18–23, 21–14, 19–20
	Pts: Vezenkov 20; Rebs: Vezenkov 11; Asts: Spanoulis 9 PIR: Vezenkov 31	Boxscore	Pts: McCollum 17; Rebs: Monia 6 Asts: McCollum 7 PIR: Karasev 19	Arena: Peace and Friendship Stadium; Attendance: 0 Referees: Juan Carlos García González, Fernando Rocha, Seffi Shemmesh

9 April 2021	A|X Armani Exchange Milan (Italy)	98–75	(Turkey) Anadolu Efes	Milan
20:45 (CET)	Scoring by quarter: 29–19, 20–20, 29–17, 20–19
	Pts: Shields 19; Rebs: Evans 7 Asts: Rodríguez 10; PIR: Shields 20	Boxscore	Pts: Beaubois 15; Rebs: Moerman 5 Asts: Beaubois 5 PIR: Beaubois 21	Arena: Mediolanum Forum; Attendance: 0 Referees: Miguel Ángel Pérez Pérez, Oļegs Latiševs, Gytis Vilius

9 April 2021	Barcelona (Spain)	72–82	(Germany) Bayern Munich	Barcelona
21:00 (CET)	Scoring by quarter: 22–29, 15–14, 18–17, 17–22
	Pts: Bolmaro, Westermann 12; Rebs: Gasol, Hanga 4 Asts: Calathes 5 PIR: Davies 17	Boxscore	Pts: Reynolds 26; Rebs: three players 5 Asts: Baldwin, Šiško 6 PIR: Reynolds 26	Arena: Palau Blaugrana; Attendance: 0 Referees: Christos Christodoulou, Damir Javor, Tomasz Trawicki
