= 2018–19 EuroCup Basketball Playoffs =

The 2018–19 EuroCup Basketball Playoffs began on 5 March and will end on 12 or 15 April 2019 with the second or third leg, if necessary, of the 2019 EuroCup Finals, to decide the champions of the 2018–19 EuroCup Basketball. Eight teams compete in the playoffs.

Times up to 27 March 2019 are CET (UTC+1), thereafter (finals) times are CEST (UTC+2).

== Format ==
The playoffs involves the eight teams which qualified as winners and runners-up of each of the four groups in the 2018–19 EuroCup Basketball Top 16.

Each tie in the playoffs, apart from the final, is played with a best-of-three-games format. The team that performed better in the Top 16 will play the games first and third, if necessary, at home.

== Qualified teams ==
Group	Winners (Seeded in quarterfinals)	Runners-up (Unseeded in quarterfinals)
E	(Germany) Alba Berlin	(Lithuania) Rytas
F	(France) LDLC ASVEL	(Russia) Lokomotiv Kuban
G	(Spain) Valencia Basket	(Spain) Unicaja
H	(Russia) UNICS	(Spain) MoraBanc Andorra

=== Standings ===
Pos	Grp	Team	Pld	W	L	PF	PA	PD
1	G	(Spain) Valencia Basket	6	6	0	501	458	+43
2	H	(Russia) UNICS	6	5	1	507	426	+81
3	E	(Germany) Alba Berlin	6	5	1	487	451	+36
4	F	(France) LDLC ASVEL	6	5	1	445	411	+34
5	H	(Spain) MoraBanc Andorra	6	5	1	479	459	+20
6	F	(Russia) Lokomotiv Kuban	6	4	2	474	423	+51
7	E	(Lithuania) Rytas	6	3	3	482	460	+22
8	G	(Spain) Unicaja	6	3	3	468	485	−17

Source: EuroCup Basketball

== Bracket ==
Quarterfinals
(Spain) Valencia Basket	75	71
(Lithuania) Rytas	64	56
(Russia) UNICS	86	59	69
(Russia) Lokomotiv Kuban	66	68	65
(Germany) Alba Berlin	90	101	79
(Spain) Unicaja	91	81	75
(France) LDLC ASVEL	79	79	80
(Spain) MoraBanc Andorra	75	98	82

Semifinals
(Spain) Valencia Basket	69	79
(Russia) UNICS	64	73
(Germany) Alba Berlin	102	87
(Spain) MoraBanc Andorra	97	81

Finals
(Spain) Valencia Basket	89	92	89
(Germany) Alba Berlin	75	95	63

== Quarterfinals ==
The first legs were played on 5 March, the second legs on 8 March and the third legs, if necessary, on 13 March 2019.

Team 1	Series	Team 2	Game 1	Game 2	Game 3
Alba Berlin (Germany)	2–1	(Spain) Unicaja	90–91	101–81	79–75
LDLC ASVEL (France)	1–2	(Spain) MoraBanc Andorra	79–75	79–98	80–82
Valencia Basket (Spain)	2–0	(Lithuania) Rytas	75–64	71–56	
UNICS (Russia)	2–1	(Russia) Lokomotiv Kuban	86–66	59–68	69–65

=== First leg ===
5 March 2019	UNICS (Russia)	86–66 (Series: 1–0)	(Russia) Lokomotiv Kuban	Kazan
17:00	Scoring by quarter: 18–14, 23–24, 25–12, 20–16
	Pts: McCollum 32; Rebs: Ejim, Kaimakoglou 7 Asts: Henry 9 PIR: McCollum 37	Boxscore	Pts: Kulagin 17; Rebs: McLean 6 Asts: Lacey, McLean 4 PIR: Johnson 15	Arena: Basket Hall; Attendance: 4,096; Referees: Sreten Radović (CRO), Milan Nedović (SLO), Hugues Thépénier (FRA)

5 March 2019	Alba Berlin (Germany)	90–91 (Series: 0–1)	(Spain) Unicaja	Berlin
19:00	Scoring by quarter: 29–17, 29–22, 12–27, 20–25
	Pts: Siva 14; Rebs: Nnoko 6 Asts: Hermannsson 10; PIR: Hermannsson 17	Boxscore	Pts: Lessort 18; Rebs: Lessort 7 Asts: Roberts 7 PIR: Lessort 32	Arena: Max Schmeling Halle; Attendance: 6,322; Referees: Oļegs Latiševs (LAT), Sérgio Silva (POR), Saulius Racys (SWE)

5 March 2019	LDLC ASVEL (France)	79–75 (Series: 1–0)	(Spain) MoraBanc Andorra	Villeurbanne
20:30	Scoring by quarter: 17–20, 17–22, 30–18, 15–15
	Pts: Lombahe-Kahudi 21; Rebs: Kalnietis 7 Asts: Kalnietis 5 PIR: Lombahe-Kahudi 26	Boxscore	Pts: Diagne 16; Rebs: Diagne 8 Asts: Ennis, Jelínek 4 PIR: Diagne 29	Arena: Astroballe; Attendance: 5,560; Referees: Spiros Gkontas (GRE), Gytis Vilius (LTU), Michele Rossi (ITA)

5 March 2019	Valencia Basket (Spain)	75–64 (Series: 1–0)	(Lithuania) Rytas	Valencia
20:45	Scoring by quarter: 12–20, 14–10, 22–13, 27–21
	Pts: M. Thomas 15; Rebs: Tobey 9 Asts: Van Rossom, Vives 3 PIR: M. Thomas 16	Boxscore	Pts: Seeley, Sirvydis 11; Rebs: Echodas 8 Asts: Stipčević 4 PIR: Sirvydis 11	Arena: Fuente de San Luis; Attendance: 7,438; Referees: Christos Christodoulou (GRE), Erşan Kartal (TUR), Marko Juras (SRB)

=== Second leg ===
8 March 2019	Rytas (Lithuania)	56–71 (Series: 0–2)	(Spain) Valencia Basket	Vilnius
18:00	Scoring by quarter: 14–20, 25–13, 9–24, 8–14
	Pts: Echodas 11; Rebs: Butkevičius 6 Asts: Butkevičius, Stipčević 6 PIR: Butkevičius 18	Boxscore	Pts: Tobey 18; Rebs: Tobey 7 Asts: Van Rossom 5 PIR: Tobey 22	Arena: Siemens Arena; Attendance: 6,539; Referees: Ilija Belošević (SRB), Matej Boltauzer (SLO), Amit Balak (ISR)

8 March 2019	Lokomotiv Kuban (Russia)	68–59 (Series: 1–1)	(Russia) UNICS	Krasnodar
18:00	Scoring by quarter: 13–13, 15–7, 11–19, 29–20
	Pts: Kulagin 26; Rebs: Wright 7 Asts: Khvostov, Lacey 4 PIR: Kulagin 23	Boxscore	Pts: McCollum 19; Rebs: Henry 7 Asts: Henry 6 PIR: McCollum 16	Arena: Basket Hall; Attendance: 3,543; Referees: Emin Moğulkoç (TUR), Mehdi Difallah (FRA), Eduard Udyanskyy (GBR)

8 March 2019	Unicaja (Spain)	81–101 (Series: 1–1)	(Germany) Alba Berlin	Málaga
20:45	Scoring by quarter: 26–23, 17–28, 23–21, 15–29
	Pts: Shermadini 15; Rebs: Lessort, Wiltjer 5 Asts: Roberts 9 PIR: Roberts 20	Boxscore	Pts: Giedraitis 23; Rebs: Sikma, Siva 6 Asts: Hermannsson 9 PIR: Giedraitis 23	Arena: Martín Carpena; Attendance: 9,650; Referees: Saša Pukl (SLO), Petros Papapetrou (GRE), Uroš Nikolić (SRB)

8 March 2019	MoraBanc Andorra (Spain)	98–79 (Series: 1–1)	(France) LDLC ASVEL	Andorra la Vella
20:45	Scoring by quarter: 19–22, 28–19, 27–14, 24–24
	Pts: Luz 17; Rebs: Ennis, Vitali 6 Asts: Albicy 7 PIR: Ennis 23	Boxscore	Pts: Maledon 16; Rebs: Bilan 8 Asts: Maledon 5 PIR: Bilan 16	Arena: Poliesportiu d'Andorra; Attendance: 4,080; Referees: Jakub Zamojski (POL), Robert Vyklický (CZE), Josip Radojković (CRO)

=== Third leg ===
13 March 2019	UNICS (Russia)	69–65 (Series: 2–1)	(Russia) Lokomotiv Kuban	Kazan
17:00	Scoring by quarter: 10–16, 27–13, 10–17, 22–19
	Pts: Kaimakoglou 14; Rebs: McCollum 5 Asts: Henry 5 PIR: Kaimakoglou, Smith 14	Boxscore	Pts: Kulagin 16; Rebs: Johnson 12; Asts: Khvostov 4 PIR: Johnson 27	Arena: Basket Hall; Attendance: 3,543 (tentative); Referees: Damir Javor (SLO), Amit Balak (ISR), Sinan İşgüder (TUR)

13 March 2019	Alba Berlin (Germany)	79–75 (Series: 2–1)	(Spain) Unicaja	Berlin
19:00	Scoring by quarter: 23–21, 13–18, 26–25, 17–11
	Pts: Siva 15; Rebs: Sikma 7 Asts: Siva 10; PIR: Siva 16	Boxscore	Pts: Lessort 18; Rebs: Suárez 7 Asts: Boatright 5 PIR: Lessort 29	Arena: Mercedes-Benz Arena; Attendance: 7,039 (tentative); Referees: Ilija Belošević (SRB), Sašo Petek (SLO), Josip Radojković (CRO)

13 March 2019	LDLC ASVEL (France)	80–82 (Series: 1–2)	(Spain) MoraBanc Andorra	Villeurbanne
20:30	Scoring by quarter: 22–19, 17–29, 22–19, 19–15
	Pts: Bilan 19; Rebs: Bilan 8 Asts: Kalnietis 7 PIR: Bilan 22	Boxscore	Pts: Ennis, Jordan 14; Rebs: Diagne 5 Asts: Ennis 7 PIR: Jelínek 15	Arena: Astroballe; Attendance: 4,732 (tentative); Referees: Christos Christodoulou (GRE), Aare Halliko (EST), Renaud Geller (BEL)

== Semifinals ==
The first legs were played on 19 March, the second legs on 22 March.

Team 1	Series	Team 2	Game 1	Game 2	Game 3
Alba Berlin (Germany)	2–0	(Spain) MoraBanc Andorra	102–97	87–81	
Valencia Basket (Spain)	2–0	(Russia) UNICS	69–64	79–73	

=== First leg ===
19 March 2019	Valencia Basket (Spain)	69–64 (Series: 1–0)	(Russia) UNICS	Valencia
18:30	Scoring by quarter: 11–10, 17–20, 16–18, 25–16
	Pts: Tobey, San Emeterio 14; Rebs: Dubljević 8 Asts: Vives 4 PIR: Tobey 19	Boxscore	Pts: McCollum 16; Rebs: Ndour 9 Asts: Henry 5 PIR: three players 12	Arena: Fuente de San Luis; Attendance: 7,170 (tentative); Referees: Jakub Zamojski (POL), Sašo Petek (SLO), Michele Rossi (ITA)

19 March 2019	Alba Berlin (Germany)	102–97 (Series: 1–0)	(Spain) MoraBanc Andorra	Berlin
20:00	Scoring by quarter: 29–21, 30–22, 26–30, 17–24
	Pts: Sikma 20; Rebs: Sikma 7 Asts: Siva 9 PIR: Siva 32	Boxscore	Pts: Jelínek 16; Rebs: Upshaw 10; Asts: Albicy 12; PIR: Albicy, Jordan 18	Arena: Mercedes-Benz Arena; Attendance: 9,111 (tentative); Referees: Milivoje Jovčić (SRB), Miloš Koljenšić (MNE), Nick Van Den Broeck (BEL)

=== Second leg ===
22 March 2019	UNICS (Russia)	73–79 (Series: 0–2)	(Spain) Valencia Basket	Kazan
17:00	Scoring by quarter: 16–23, 20–16, 16–17, 21–23
	Pts: McCollum 13; Rebs: Morgan 7 Asts: McCollum 5 PIR: Ndour 18	Boxscore	Pts: Van Rossom, M. Thomas 15; Rebs: W. Thomas 7 Asts: three players 3 PIR: Van Rossom 19	Arena: Basket Hall; Attendance: 6,193 (tentative); Referees: Saša Pukl (SLO), Seffi Shemmes (ISR), Uroš Nikolić (SRB)

22 March 2019	MoraBanc Andorra (Spain)	81–87 (Series: 0–2)	(Germany) Alba Berlin	Andorra la Vella
20:15	Scoring by quarter: 23–25, 19–26, 20–22, 19–14
	Pts: Albicy 20; Rebs: Jordan 7 Asts: Albicy 6 PIR: Jordan 23	Boxscore	Pts: Siva 21; Rebs: Giffey, Thiemann 6 Asts: Sikma, Siva 3 PIR: Giedraitis 16	Arena: Poliesportiu d'Andorra; Attendance: 3,690 (tentative); Referees: Luigi Lamonica (ITA), Elias Koromilas (GRE), Marcin Kowalski (POL)

== Finals ==
The first leg will be played on 9 April, the second leg on 12 April, and the third leg on 15 April 2019, if necessary.

Team 1	Series	Team 2	Game 1	Game 2	Game 3
Valencia Basket (Spain)	2–1	(Germany) Alba Berlin	89–75	92–95	89–63

=== First leg ===
9 April 2019	Valencia Basket (Spain)	89–75 (Series: 1–0)	(Germany) Alba Berlin	Valencia
20:30	Scoring by quarter: 20–13, 21–25, 30–15, 18–22
	Pts: Thomas 22; Rebs: Dubljević 8 Asts: Van Rossom 7 PIR: Thomas 25	Boxscore	Pts: Siva 17; Rebs: Sikma, Thiemann 5 Asts: Siva 7 PIR: Siva 20	Arena: Fuente de San Luis; Attendance: 7,911; Referees: Sreten Radović (CRO), Emin Moğulkoç (TUR), Robert Vyklický (CZE)

=== Second leg ===
12 April 2019	Alba Berlin (Germany)	95–92(OT) (Series: 1–1)	(Spain) Valencia Basket	Berlin
20:00	Scoring by quarter: 23–21, 19–18, 20–20, 21–24, Overtime: 12–9
	Pts: Giedraitis 17; Rebs: Sikma 6 Asts: Hermannsson, Siva 6 PIR: Sikma 20	Boxscore	Pts: Van Rossom 22; Rebs: Labeyrie 5 Asts: Thomas 5 PIR: San Emeterio, Van Rossom 21	Arena: Mercedes-Benz Arena; Attendance: 12,945; Referees: Ilija Belošević (SRB), Elias Koromilas (GRE), Gytis Vilius (LTU)

=== Third leg ===
15 April 2019	Valencia Basket (Spain)	89–63 (Series: 2–1)	(Germany) Alba Berlin	Valencia
20:30	Scoring by quarter: 17–18, 29–15, 17–11, 26–19
	Pts: M. Thomas 19; Rebs: Dubljević 8 Asts: Antoine Diot 7te PIR: Dubljević 27	Boxscore	Pts: Giedraitis 19; Rebs: Sikma 8 Asts: Sikma, Siva 4 PIR: Giedraitis 15	Arena: Fuente de San Luis; Attendance: 8,014; Referees: Fernando Rocha (POR), Petri Mantyla (FIN), Milan Nedović (SLO)
