= 2019 EuroCup Finals =

2019 EuroCup finals
- Event: 2018–19 EuroCup Basketball
Valencia Basket	Alba Berlin
(Spain)	(Germany)
2	1

First leg
Valencia Basket	Alba Berlin
89	75
- Date: 9 April 2019
- Venue: Fuente de San Luis, Valencia
- MVP: Will Thomas
- Attendance: 7,911

Second leg
Alba Berlin	Valencia Basket
95	92
- Date: 12 April 2019
- Venue: Mercedes-Benz Arena, Berlin
- Attendance: 12,945

Third leg
Valencia Basket	Alba Berlin
89	63
- Date: 15 April 2019
- Venue: Fuente de San Luis, Valencia
- Attendance: 8,014

The 2019 EuroCup finals were the concluding games of the 2018–19 EuroCup season, the 17th season of Europe's secondary club basketball tournament organised by Euroleague Basketball, the 11th season since it was renamed from the ULEB Cup to the EuroCup, and the third season under the title sponsorship name of 7DAYS. The first leg played at the Fuente de San Luis arena in Valencia, Spain, on 9 April 2019, the second leg played at the Mercedes-Benz Arena in Berlin, Germany, on 12 April 2019 and the third leg, if necessary, would be played again at the Fuente de San Luis arena in Valencia, Spain, on 15 April 2019, between Spanish side Valencia Basket and German side Alba Berlin.

It was the sixth Finals appearance in the competition for Valencia Basket and the second ever final appearance in EuroCup for Alba Berlin. Both teams met previously in the 2010 Finals played in Vitoria-Gasteiz, Spain, and Valencia beat the Germans by 67–44.

Valencia Basket has won the series 2-1 and also achieved qualification to the 2019–20 EuroLeague.

== Venues ==
Valencia	2019 EuroCup Finals (Europe)	Berlin
Fuente de San Luis	2019 EuroCup Finals (Europe)	Mercedes-Benz Arena
Capacity: 9,000	2019 EuroCup Finals (Europe)	Capacity: 14,500

== Road to the Finals ==
Note: In the table, the score of the finalist is given first (H = home; A = away).

(Spain) Valencia Basket					Round	(Germany) Alba Berlin				
1st place (8–2) (Group C)					Regular season	2nd place (7–3) (Group B)				
1st place (6–0) (Group G)					Top 16	1st place (5–1) (Group E)				
Opponent	Series	1st leg	2nd leg	3rd leg	Playoffs	Opponent	Series	1st leg	2nd leg	3rd leg
(Lithuania) Rytas	2–0	75–64 (H)	71–56 (A)		Quarterfinals	(Spain) Unicaja	2–1	90–91 (H)	101–81 (A)	79–75 (H)
(Russia) UNICS	2–0	69–64 (H)	79–73 (A)		Semifinals	(Spain) MoraBanc Andorra	2–0	102–97 (H)	87–81 (A)	

== First leg ==
9 April 2019	Valencia Basket (Spain)	89–75 (Series: 1–0)	(Germany) Alba Berlin	Valencia
20:30	Scoring by quarter: 20–13, 21–25, 30–15, 18–22
	Pts: Thomas 22; Rebs: Dubljević 8 Asts: Van Rossom 7 PIR: Thomas 25	Boxscore	Pts: Siva 17; Rebs: Sikma, Thiemann 5 Asts: Siva 7 PIR: Siva 20	Arena: Fuente de San Luis; Attendance: 7,911; Referees: Sreten Radović (CRO), Emin Moğulkoç (TUR), Robert Vyklický (CZE)

Starters:			Pts	Reb	Ast
PG	9	(Belgium) Sam Van Rossom	15	1	7
SG	19	(Spain) Fernando San Emeterio	11	4	1
SF	30	(Spain) Joan Sastre	2	2	2
PF	10	(Georgia (country)) Will Thomas	22	6	1
C	13	(United States) Mike Tobey	3	6	1
Reserves:					
SF	6	(Spain) Alberto Abalde	2	0	0
PF	7	(France) Louis Labeyrie	7	6	0
SG	8	(France) Antoine Diot	0	2	4
C	14	(Montenegro) Bojan Dubljević	9	8	1
SG	17	(Spain) Rafa Martínez	0	0	0
SG	21	(United States) Matt Thomas	16	1	1
PF	42	(Canada) Aaron Doornekamp	2	4	2
Head coach:
(Spain) Jaume Ponsarnau

Valencia Basket	Alba Berlin

Valencia	Statistics	Alba Berlin
23/36 (63.9%)	2-pt field goals	16/37 (43.2%)
9/26 (34.6%)	3-pt field goals	12/24 (50%)
16/20 (80%)	Free throws	7/12 (58.3%)
16	Offensive rebounds	9
26	Defensive rebounds	15
42	Total rebounds	24
20	Assists	16
12	Turnovers	10
4	Steals	5
1	Blocks	1
16	Fouls	21

Starters:			Pts	Reb	Ast
PG	3	(United States) Peyton Siva	17	1	7
SG	15	(Iceland) Martin Hermannsson	16	0	2
SF	31	(Lithuania) Rokas Giedraitis	9	2	3
PF	43	(United States) Luke Sikma	7	5	3
C	42	(United States) Dennis Clifford	4	0	0
Reserves:					
G	1	(Germany) Joshiko Saibu	0	1	0
SF	5	(Germany) Niels Giffey	7	2	0
PF	10	(Germany) Tim Schneider	0	2	0
SF	22	(Germany) Franz Wagner	2	0	0
G	25	(Germany) Kenneth Ogbe	1	1	0
PF	32	(Germany) Johannes Thiemann	8	5	1
C	35	(Cameroon) Landry Nnoko	4	3	0
Head coach:
(Spain) Aíto García Reneses

== Second leg ==
12 April 2019	Alba Berlin (Germany)	95–92(OT) (Series: 1–1)	(Spain) Valencia Basket	Berlin
20:00	Scoring by quarter: 23–21, 19–18, 20–20, 21–24, Overtime: 12–9
	Pts: Giedraitis 17; Rebs: Sikma 6 Asts: Hermannsson, Siva 6 PIR: Sikma 20	Boxscore	Pts: Van Rossom 22; Rebs: Labeyrie 5 Asts: Thomas 5 PIR: San Emeterio, Van Rossom 21	Arena: Mercedes-Benz Arena; Attendance: 12,945; Referees: Ilija Belošević (SRB), Elias Koromilas (GRE), Gytis Vilius (LTU)

Starters:			Pts	Reb	Ast
PG	3	(United States) Peyton Siva	14	2	6
SG	15	(Iceland) Martin Hermannsson	14	4	6
SF	31	(Lithuania) Rokas Giedraitis	17	2	1
PF	43	(United States) Luke Sikma	15	6	4
C	42	(United States) Dennis Clifford	5	4	0
Reserves:					
G	1	(Germany) Joshiko Saibu	2	1	1
SF	5	(Germany) Niels Giffey	11	2	1
PF	10	(Germany) Tim Schneider	0	3	0
SF	22	(Germany) Franz Wagner	6	0	0
G	25	(Germany) Kenneth Ogbe	DNP		
PF	32	(Germany) Johannes Thiemann	7	2	1
C	35	(Cameroon) Landry Nnoko	4	3	0
Head coach:
(Spain) Aíto García Reneses

Alba Berlin	Valencia Basket

Alba Berlin	Statistics	Valencia
22/42 (52.4%)	2-pt field goals	12/23 (52.2%)
8/27 (29.6%)	3-pt field goals	14/30 (46.7%)
27/32 (84.4%)	Free throws	26/31 (83.9%)
15	Offensive rebounds	10
18	Defensive rebounds	25
33	Total rebounds	35
20	Assists	16
8	Turnovers	19
7	Steals	2
1	Blocks	0
30	Fouls	30

Starters:			Pts	Reb	Ast
PG	9	(Belgium) Sam Van Rossom	22	3	3
SG	19	(Spain) Fernando San Emeterio	16	4	2
SF	30	(Spain) Joan Sastre	6	3	1
PF	10	(Georgia (country)) Will Thomas	15	4	5
C	13	(United States) Mike Tobey	3	0	0
Reserves:					
SF	6	(Spain) Alberto Abalde	4	2	0
PF	7	(France) Louis Labeyrie	5	5	0
SG	8	(France) Antoine Diot	2	1	1
C	14	(Montenegro) Bojan Dubljević	9	4	1
SG	17	(Spain) Rafa Martínez	DNP		
SG	21	(United States) Matt Thomas	5	2	2
PF	42	(Canada) Aaron Doornekamp	5	3	1
Head coach:
(Spain) Jaume Ponsarnau

== Third leg ==
15 April 2019	Valencia Basket (Spain)	89–63 (Series: 2–1)	(Germany) Alba Berlin	Valencia
20:30	Scoring by quarter: 17–18, 29–15, 17–11, 26–19
	Pts: M. Thomas 19; Rebs: Dubljević 8 Asts: Antoine Diot 7te PIR: Dubljević 27	Boxscore	Pts: Giedraitis 19; Rebs: Sikma 8 Asts: Sikma, Siva 4 PIR: Giedraitis 15	Arena: Fuente de San Luis; Attendance: 8,014; Referees: Fernando Rocha (POR), Petri Mantyla (FIN), Milan Nedović (SLO)

Starters:			Pts	Reb	Ast
PG	9	(Belgium) Sam Van Rossom	0	1	4
SG	16	(Spain) Guillem Vives	0	0	1
SF	19	(Spain) Fernando San Emeterio	18	2	2
PF	10	(Georgia (country)) Will Thomas	15	3	2
C	13	(United States) Mike Tobey	1	4	1
Reserves:					
SF	6	(Spain) Alberto Abalde	3	0	0
PF	7	(France) Louis Labeyrie	4	7	2
SG	8	(France) Antoine Diot	2	5	7
C	14	(Montenegro) Bojan Dubljević	18	8	3
SG	21	(United States) Matt Thomas	19	1	3
SF	30	(Spain) Joan Sastre	5	0	0
PF	42	(Canada) Aaron Doornekamp	4	1	0
Head coach:
(Spain) Jaume Ponsarnau

Valencia Basket	Alba Berlin

Valencia	Statistics	Alba Berlin
19/35 (54.3%)	2-pt field goals	14/31 (45.2%)
13/25 (52%)	3-pt field goals	9/29 (31%)
12/19 (63.2%)	Free throws	8/9 (88.9%)
7	Offensive rebounds	9
28	Defensive rebounds	25
35	Total rebounds	34
25	Assists	15
10	Turnovers	16
9	Steals	5
5	Blocks	5
19	Fouls	22

2018–19 EuroCup champions

Valencia Basket
(4th title)

Starters:			Pts	Reb	Ast
PG	3	(United States) Peyton Siva	14	3	4
SG	15	(Iceland) Martin Hermannsson	5	0	2
SF	31	(Lithuania) Rokas Giedraitis	19	2	0
PF	43	(United States) Luke Sikma	0	8	4
C	42	(United States) Dennis Clifford	6	1	0
Reserves:					
G	1	(Germany) Joshiko Saibu	0	0	0
SF	5	(Germany) Niels Giffey	2	5	3
PF	10	(Germany) Tim Schneider	2	4	2
SF	22	(Germany) Franz Wagner	0	2	0
G	25	(Germany) Kenneth Ogbe	0	1	0
PF	32	(Germany) Johannes Thiemann	6	2	0
C	35	(Cameroon) Landry Nnoko	9	4	0
Head coach:
(Spain) Aíto García Reneses

== Finals MVP ==
Pos	Player	Team	Ref
PF	(Georgia (country)) Will Thomas	(Spain) Valencia Basket	

== See also ==
- 2019 EuroLeague Final Four
- 2019 Basketball Champions League Final Four
- 2019 FIBA Europe Cup Finals
