= 2020–21 EuroLeague =

EuroLeague season

2020–21 Turkish Airlines EuroLeague^{1}
- Season: 2020–21
- Duration: 1 October 2020 – 9 April 2021 (Regular season); 20 April 2021 – 4 May 2021 (Playoffs); 28 May 2021 – 30 May 2021 (Final Four)
- Teams: 18

Regular season
- Top seed: (Spain) Barcelona
- Season MVP: (Serbia) Vasilije Micić

Finals
- Champions: (Turkey) Anadolu Efes (1st title)
- Runners-up: (Spain) Barcelona
- Third place: (Italy) AX Armani Exchange Milan
- Fourth place: (Russia) CSKA Moscow
- Final Four MVP: (Serbia) Vasilije Micić

Statistical leaders
Points	(Russia) Alexey Shved	19.8
Rebounds	(Cape Verde) Edy Tavares	8.0
Assists	(Russia) Alexey Shved	7.7
Index Rating	(United States) Mike James	19.7

Records
- Biggest home win: Barcelona 97–55 Fenerbahçe (12 November 2020)
- Biggest away win: ALBA Berlin 67–103 Barcelona (5 November 2020)
- Highest scoring: Zenit Saint Petersburg 112–83 Panathinaikos (12 April 2021)
- Winning streak: 12 games CSKA Moscow
- Losing streak: 14 games Khimki
- All statistics correct as of 31 May 2021.^{1} Sponsored league name, referring to Turkish Airlines.

The 2020–21 EuroLeague was the 21st season of the modern era of the EuroLeague and the 11th under the title sponsorship of Turkish Airlines. Including the competition's previous incarnation as the FIBA Europe Champions Cup, this was the 64th season of the premier basketball competition for European men's clubs. The season started 1 October 2020.

As the season was the first to be played after the previous season was abandoned due to travel restrictions caused by the COVID-19 pandemic, the EuroLeague board ruled that the 18 teams from the previous season would stay in the league. Anadolu Efes won the championship after defeating Barcelona in the championship game.

== Team allocation ==
A total of 18 teams from 10 countries participated in the 2020–21 EuroLeague.

=== Distribution ===
The following is the access list for this season.

Access list for 2020–21 EuroLeague
	Teams entering in this round	Teams advancing from previous round
Regular season (18 teams)	11 licensed clubs with a long-term licence; 7 associated clubs with an annual licence	
Playoffs (8 teams)		8 highest-placed teams from the regular season
Final Four (4 teams)		4 series winners from the playoffs

=== Qualified teams ===
The labels in the parentheses show how each team qualified for the place of its starting round:

- EL: Played in curtailed 2019–20 EuroLeague

Qualified teams for 2020–21 EuroLeague Licensed clubs
(Spain) Barcelona	(Greece) Olympiacos	(Turkey) Anadolu Efes	(Lithuania) Žalgiris
(Spain) Baskonia	(Greece) Panathinaikos	(Turkey) Fenerbahçe	(Russia) CSKA Moscow^{TH}
(Spain) Real Madrid	(Israel) Maccabi Tel Aviv	(Italy) Olimpia Milano	

Associated clubs
(Germany) ALBA Berlin (EL)	(Russia) Khimki Moscow (EL)	(Spain) Valencia Basket (EL)	(Serbia) Crvena Zvezda (EL)
(Germany) Bayern Munich (EL)	(Russia) Zenit Saint Petersburg (EL)	(France) ASVEL (EL)	

== Teams ==
=== Venues and locations ===
Location of teams in 2020-21 EuroLeague

Team	Home city	Arena	Capacity
(Germany) ALBA Berlin	Berlin	Mercedes-Benz Arena	14,500
(Turkey) Anadolu Efes	Istanbul	Sinan Erdem Dome	16,000
(Italy) AX Armani Exchange Milan	Milan	Mediolanum Forum	12,700
(Spain) Barcelona	Barcelona	Palau Blaugrana	7,585
(Germany) Bayern Munich	Munich	Audi Dome	6,500
(Serbia) Crvena zvezda mts	Belgrade	Aleksandar Nikolić Hall	8,000
(Russia) CSKA Moscow	Moscow	Megasport Arena	13,344
(Turkey) Fenerbahçe Beko	Istanbul	Ülker Sports and Event Hall	13,059
(Russia) Khimki	Khimki	Mytishchi Arena	7,280
(France) LDLC ASVEL	Villeurbanne	Astroballe	5,556
(Israel) Maccabi Playtika Tel Aviv	Tel Aviv	Menora Mivtachim Arena	10,383
(Greece) Olympiacos	Piraeus	Peace and Friendship Stadium	11,640
(Greece) Panathinaikos OPAP	Athens	O.A.K.A.	18,989
(Spain) Real Madrid	Madrid	WiZink Center	13,109
(Spain) TD Systems Baskonia	Vitoria-Gasteiz	Buesa Arena	15,504
(Spain) Valencia Basket	Valencia	La Fonteta	8,500
(Lithuania) Žalgiris	Kaunas	Žalgirio Arena	15,415
(Russia) Zenit Saint Petersburg	Saint Petersburg	Sibur Arena	7,120

=== Personnel and sponsorship ===
Team	Head coach	Captain	Kit manufacturer	Shirt sponsor
(Germany) ALBA Berlin	(Spain) Aíto García Reneses	(Germany) Niels Giffey	Adidas	ALBA SE
(Turkey) Anadolu Efes	(Turkey) Ergin Ataman	(Turkey) Doğuş Balbay	Bilcee	Anadolu Efes
(Italy) A|X Armani Exchange Milan	(Italy) Ettore Messina	(Italy) Andrea Cinciarini	Armani	Armani Exchange
(Spain) Barcelona	(Lithuania) Šarūnas Jasikevičius	(Spain) Pierre Oriola	Nike	Assistència Sanitària
(Germany) Bayern Munich	(Italy) Andrea Trinchieri	(Bosnia and Herzegovina) Nihad Đedović	Adidas	BayWa
(Serbia) Crvena zvezda mts	(Montenegro) Dejan Radonjić	(Serbia) Branko Lazić	Adidas	mts
(Russia) CSKA Moscow	(Greece) Dimitrios Itoudis	(Russia) Nikita Kurbanov	Nike	Rostelecom
(Turkey) Fenerbahçe Beko	(Serbia) Igor Kokoškov	(Turkey) Melih Mahmutoğlu	Nike	Beko
(Russia) Khimki	(Russia) Andrey Maltsev	(Russia) Sergei Monia	Adidas	Khimki Group
(France) LDLC ASVEL	(France) T. J. Parker	(France) Charles Lombahe-Kahudi	Adidas	LDLC
(Israel) Maccabi Playtika Tel Aviv	(Greece) Ioannis Sfairopoulos	(Israel) John DiBartolomeo	Nike	Playtika
(Greece) Olympiacos	(Greece) Georgios Bartzokas	(Greece) Vassilis Spanoulis	GSA Sport	bwin
(Greece) Panathinaikos OPAP	(Israel) Oded Kattash	(Greece) Ioannis Papapetrou	Adidas	Pame Stoixima
(Spain) Real Madrid	(Spain) Pablo Laso	(Spain) Felipe Reyes	Adidas	Palladium Hotel Group
(Spain) TD Systems Baskonia	(Montenegro) Duško Ivanović	(Argentina) Luca Vildoza	Kelme	Teduinsa
(Spain) Valencia Basket	(Spain) Jaume Ponsarnau	(Montenegro) Bojan Dubljević	Luanvi	Cultura del Esfuerzo^{1}
(Lithuania) Žalgiris	(Austria) Martin Schiller	(Lithuania) Paulius Jankūnas	ŽalgirisShop	
(Russia) Zenit Saint Petersburg	(Spain) Xavi Pascual	(Poland) Mateusz Ponitka	Nike	Nipigas

Notes
1. Cultura del Esfuerzo (transl. "Culture of Effort") is the motto of the club.

=== Managerial changes ===
Team	Outgoing manager	Manner of departure	Date of vacancy	Position in table	Replaced with	Date of appointment
(Greece) Panathinaikos OPAP	(United States) Rick Pitino	Mutual consent	20 March 2020	Pre-season	(Greece) Georgios Vovoras	17 June 2020
(France) ASVEL	(Montenegro) Zvezdan Mitrović	Sacked	21 May 2020	Pre-season	(France) T. J. Parker	17 June 2020
(Serbia) Crvena zvezda mts	(Serbia) Dragan Šakota	Mutual consent	8 June 2020	Pre-season	(Serbia) Saša Obradović	10 June 2020
(Turkey) Fenerbahçe Beko	(Serbia) Željko Obradović	Mutual consent	23 June 2020	Pre-season	(Serbia) Igor Kokoškov	4 July 2020
(Spain) Barcelona	(Serbia) Svetislav Pešić	Mutual consent	1 July 2020	Pre-season	(Lithuania) Šarūnas Jasikevičius	2 July 2020
(Lithuania) Žalgiris	(Lithuania) Šarūnas Jasikevičius	Mutual consent	2 July 2020	Pre-season	(Austria) Martin Schiller	14 July 2020
(Germany) Bayern Munich	(Serbia) Oliver Kostić	Mutual consent	15 July 2020	Pre-season	(Italy) Andrea Trinchieri	15 July 2020
(Serbia) Crvena zvezda mts	(Serbia) Saša Obradović	Mutual consent	24 December 2020	17th (5–11)	(Montenegro) Dejan Radonjić	25 December 2020
(Greece) Panathinaikos OPAP	(Greece) Georgios Vovoras	Mutual consent	4 January 2021	16th (5-11)	(Greece) Kostas Charalampidis (interim)	4 January 2021
(Greece) Panathinaikos OPAP	(Greece) Kostas Charalampidis	End of caretaker spell	14 January 2021	15th (6-12)	(Israel) Oded Kattash	14 January 2021
(Russia) Khimki	(Lithuania) Rimas Kurtinaitis	Sacked	15 January 2021	18th (2-18)	(Russia) Andrey Maltsev (interim)	15 January 2021

=== Referees ===
A total of 70 Euroleague Basketball officials set to work on the 2020–21 season in EuroLeague and EuroCup:

- (Albania) Gentian Cici
- (Belgium) Nick Van den Broeck
- (Croatia) Denis Hadžić
- (Croatia) Josip Radojković
- (Croatia) Luka Kardum
- (Croatia) Sreten Radović
- (Croatia) Tomislav Hordov
- (Czech Republic) Robert Vyklický
- (Estonia) Aare Halliko
- (Estonia) Rain Peerandi
- (Finland) Petri Mäntylä
- (France) Hugues Thépénier
- (France) Joseph Bissang
- (France) Mehdi Difallah
- (Germany) Anne Panther
- (Germany) Benjamin Barth
- (Germany) Robert Lottermoser
- (United Kingdom) Eduard Udyanskyy
- (Greece) Christos Christodoulou
- (Greece) Elias Koromilas
- (Greece) Ioannis Foufis
- (Greece) Spiros Gkontas
- (Greece) Vasiliki Tsaroucha
- (Israel) Amit Balak
- (Israel) Seffi Shemmesh
- (Italy) Carmelo Paternicò
- (Italy) Luigi Lamonica
- (Italy) Michele Rossi
- (Latvia) Ingus Baumanis
- (Latvia) Kristaps Konstantinovs
- (Latvia) Oļegs Latiševs
- (Lithuania) Artūras Šukys
- (Lithuania) Gytis Vilius
- (Lithuania) Jurgis Laurinavičius
- (Montenegro) Igor Dragojević
- (Montenegro) Miloš Koljenšić
- (Poland) Jakub Zamojski
- (Poland) Marcin Kowalski
- (Poland) Piotr Pastusiak
- (Poland) Tomasz Trawicki
- (Portugal) Fernando Rocha
- (Portugal) Sérgio Silva
- (Russia) Artem Lavrukhin
- (Russia) Stanislav Valeev
- (Serbia) Ilija Belošević
- (Serbia) Marko Juras
- (Serbia) Milivoje Jovčić
- (Serbia) Uroš Nikolić
- (Serbia) Uroš Obrknežević
- (Slovenia) Damir Javor
- (Slovenia) Mario Majkić
- (Slovenia) Matej Boltauzer
- (Slovenia) Milan Nedović
- (Slovenia) Saša Pukl
- (Slovenia) Sašo Petek
- (Spain) Benjamín Jiménez
- (Spain) Carlos Cortés Rey
- (Spain) Carlos Peruga
- (Spain) Daniel Hierrezuelo
- (Spain) Emilio Pérez Pizarro
- (Spain) Jordi Aliaga
- (Spain) Juan Carlos García González
- (Spain) Miguel Ángel Pérez Pérez
- (Sweden) Saulius Račys
- (Switzerland) Sébastien Clivaz
- (Turkey) Emin Moğulkoç
- (Turkey) Hüseyin Çelik
- (Turkey) Sinan Isguder
- (Ukraine) Borys Ryzhyk
- (Ukraine) Mykola Ambrosov

== Regular season ==
=== League table ===
Pos	Team	Pld	W	L	PF	PA	PD	Qualification
1	(Spain) Barcelona	34	24	10	2706	2469	+237	Qualification to playoffs
2	(Russia) CSKA Moscow	34	24	10	2817	2662	+155	Qualification to playoffs
3	(Turkey) Anadolu Efes	34	22	12	2838	2604	+234	Qualification to playoffs
4	(Italy) A|X Armani Exchange Milan	34	21	13	2720	2599	+121	Qualification to playoffs
5	(Germany) Bayern Munich	34	21	13	2633	2599	+34	Qualification to playoffs
6	(Spain) Real Madrid	34	20	14	2667	2593	+74	Qualification to playoffs
7	(Turkey) Fenerbahçe Beko	34	20	14	2661	2679	−18	Qualification to playoffs
8	(Russia) Zenit Saint Petersburg	34	20	14	2670	2547	+123	Qualification to playoffs
9	(Spain) Valencia Basket	34	19	15	2762	2743	+19	
10	(Spain) TD Systems Baskonia	34	18	16	2742	2619	+123	
11	(Lithuania) Žalgiris	34	17	17	2630	2645	−15	
12	(Greece) Olympiacos	34	16	18	2628	2674	−46	
13	(Israel) Maccabi Tel Aviv	34	14	20	2608	2642	−34	
14	(France) LDLC ASVEL	34	13	21	2590	2714	−124	
15	(Germany) ALBA Berlin	34	12	22	2652	2790	−138	
16	(Greece) Panathinaikos OPAP	34	11	23	2656	2782	−126	
17	(Serbia) Crvena zvezda mts	34	10	24	2499	2684	−185	
18	(Russia) Khimki	34	4	30	2616	3050	−434	

Source: EuroLeague
Rules for classification: All points scored in extra period(s) will not be counted in the standings, nor for any tie-break situation.

=== Results ===
Home \ Away	BER	EFS	AXM	FCB	BAY	CZV	CSK	FNB	KHI	ASV	MTA	OLY	PAO	RMB	BAS	VBC	ZAL	ZEN
ALBA Berlin	—	72–93	70–84	67–103	72–90	81–58	68–71	89–63	100–80	76–75	73–85	80–84	74–65	63–72	95–91	86–90	71–74	66–73
Anadolu Efes	84–76	—	69–72	86–79	71–74	86–72	100–70	71–80	99–60	72–68	91–89	76–53	85–65	65–73	59–77	99–83	89–62	69–73
AX Armani Exchange Milan	75–55	98–75	—	56–72	75–51	79–87	87–91	92–100	84–74	87–73	87–68	90–79	77–80	78–70	79–84	95–80	98–92	82–76
Barcelona	80–67	86–88	87–71	—	72–82	76–65	76–66	97–55	87–74	69–76	67–68	88–96	97–89	79–72	71–57	89–72	86–62	85–81
Bayern Munich	101–95	80–79	79–81	90–77	—	74–59	81–89	68–77	80–77	76–62	72–70	74–68	76–71	76–81	77–66	90–79	71–70	82–80
Crvena zvezda mts	84–90	64–75	72–93	60–72	76–78	—	86–84	71–73	92–81	78–81	76–64	79–81	74–71	67–73	90–73	76–73	69–75	75–76
CSKA Moscow	88–93	100–65	76–84	75–88	66–69	87–72	—	83–89	97–72	88–70	76–72	80–61	93–86	74–73	89–86	84–75	83–73	83–65
Fenerbahçe Beko	89–84	74–106	71–79	73–82	71–75	77–63	77–78	—	83–71	81–59	82–75	84–77	100–74	67–93	96–76	86–90	84–61	92–84
Khimki	81–100	77–105	93–102	75–87	93–95	83–77	87–96	76–107	—	87–85	87–89	88–105	76–78	78–77	67–89	68–77	70–84	70–91
LDLC ASVEL	89–95	80–102	78–69	80–68	87–79	68–89	78–87	86–90	90–84	—	84–81	93–101	97–73	71–74	83–77	90–77	74–83	53–66
Maccabi Playtika Tel Aviv	80–73	66–90	85–86	99–94	82–85	81–76	80–84	65–75	92–62	67–74	—	87–89	89–81	86–84	91–82	84–72	85–57	72–78
Olympiacos	75–71	79–84	86–75	74–76	84–82	94–79	74–75	71–76	82–75	63–69	85–82	—	77–88	82–86	76–90	85–96	67–68	75–61
Panathinaikos OPAP	92–69	77–80	86–83	77–85	83–76	82–86	83–89	82–68	94–78	88–71	81–63	71–78	—	93–97	82–97	91–72	69–81	77–89
Real Madrid	91–62	83–108	76–80	76–81	100–82	77–79	89–96	94–74	94–85	91–84	79–63	72–63	76–66	—	64–84	77–93	70–58	79–72
TD Systems Baskonia	77–84	101–111	86–69	71–72	78–71	87–67	95–93	86–68	77–60	86–88	63–67	91–66	93–72	76–63	—	71–70	81–68	70–77^{1}
Valencia Basket	92–100	76–74	86–81	66–71	83–76	91–71	105–103	66–52	88–82	65–63	82–80	79–88	95–83	89–78	86–81	—	78–79	72–85^{2}
Žalgiris	96–86	89–73	64–69	62–73	74–73	75–62	78–87	99–62	102–75	85–75	81–88	81–79	93–78	90–93	92–73	82–94	—	75–83
Zenit Saint Petersburg	87–71	85–78	79–70	74–70	79–75	98–69	74–86	65–73	83–88	87–53	86–69	66–75	112–83	71–75	75–79	62–91	77–65	—

Source: EuroLeague
Legend: Blue = home team win; Red = away team win.
Matches with lighter background shading were decided after overtime.

^{1} The match, originally scheduled for 13 October, was postponed to 8 December after positive COVID-19 tests on Zenit following decision on 19 October by Euroleague on rescheduling games affected by positive tests.
^{2} The match, originally scheduled for 15 October, was postponed to 23 November after positive COVID-19 tests on Zenit following decision on 19 October by Euroleague on rescheduling games affected by positive tests.

== Playoffs ==
Playoffs series are best-of-five. The first team to win three games wins the series. A 2–2–1 format is used – teams with home-court advantage play games 1, 2, and 5 at home, while their opponents host games 3 and 4. Games 4 and 5 are only played if necessary. The four winning teams advance to the Final Four.

=== Series ===
Team 1	Series	Team 2	Game 1	Game 2	Game 3	Game 4	Game 5
Barcelona (Spain)	3–2	(Russia) Zenit Saint Petersburg	74–76	81–78 (OT)	78–70	61–74	79–53
CSKA Moscow (Russia)	3–0	(Turkey) Fenerbahçe Beko	92–76	78–67	85–68	—	—
Anadolu Efes (Turkey)	3–2	(Spain) Real Madrid	90–63	91–68	76–80	76–82	88–83
A|X Armani Exchange Milan (Italy)	3–2	(Germany) Bayern Munich	79–78	80–69	79–85	82–85	92–89

== Final Four ==
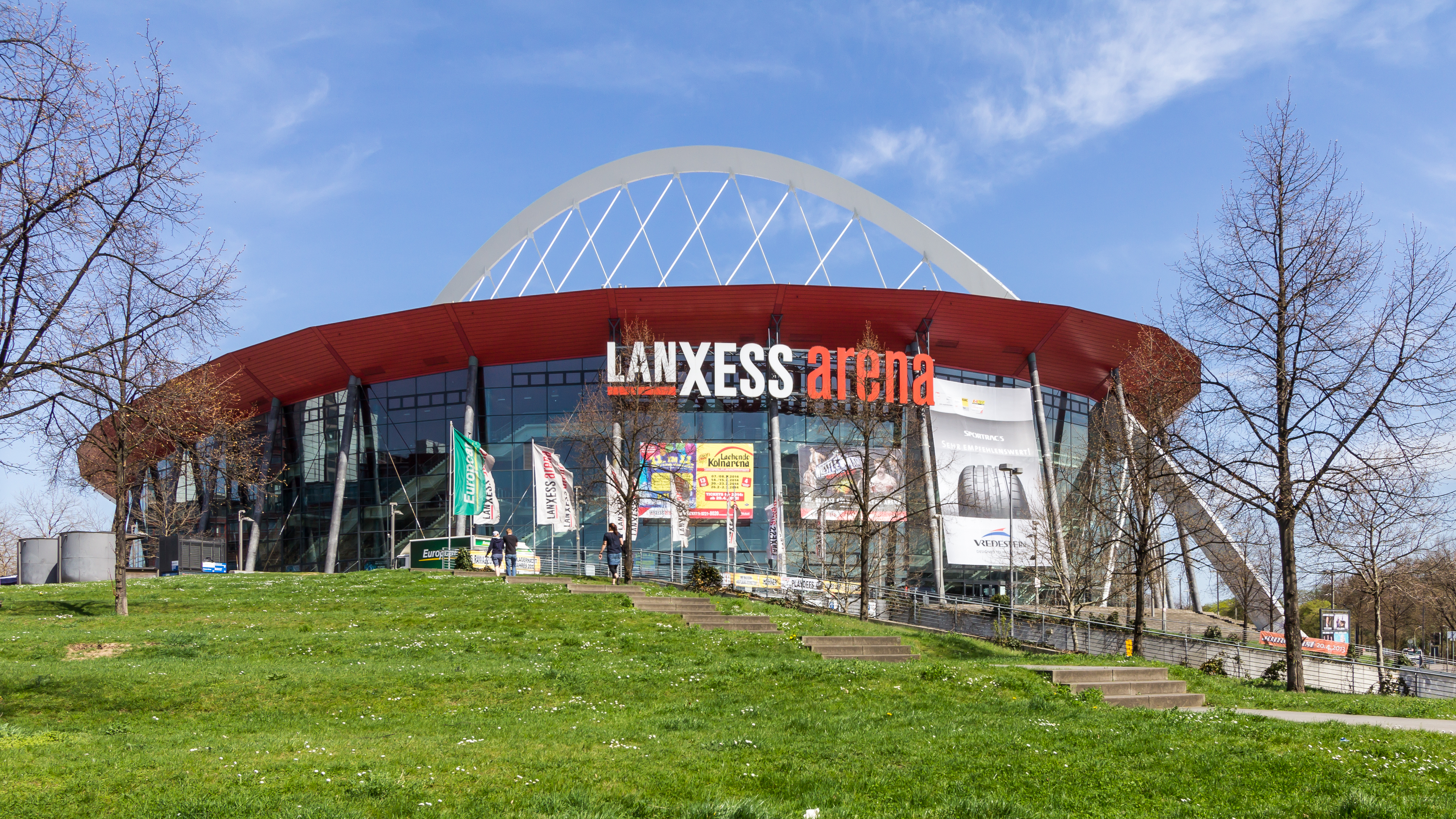
Lanxess Arena in Cologne, Germany

The Final Four, held over a single weekend, is the last phase of the season. The four remaining teams play a single knockout round on Friday evening, with the two winners advancing to the championship game. Sunday starts with the third-place game, followed by the championship game. The Final Four was played at the Lanxess Arena in Cologne, Germany, on 28–30 May 2021.

Semifinals
28 May
(Spain) Barcelona	84
(Italy) A|X Armani Exchange Milan	82
28 May
(Russia) CSKA Moscow	86
(Turkey) Anadolu Efes	89

Championship game
30 May
(Spain) Barcelona	81
(Turkey) Anadolu Efes	86
Third place game
30 May
(Italy) A|X Armani Exchange Milan	83
(Russia) CSKA Moscow	73

== Attendances ==
To start the season only seven teams played with spectators. Between 100 and 7,500 socially-distanced fans, depending on the venue and country, were allowed into the arenas of CSKA, Zenit, Fenerbahçe, Khimki, Maccabi, Žalgiris, Valencia, Milan, Baskonia, ASVEL, ALBA and Crvena zvezda.

Average home attendances
Pos	Team	Games	Presence	Total	Average
1	(Lithuania) Žalgiris	17	3	10,381	3,460
2	(Russia) CSKA Moscow	19	19	64,970	3,419
3	(Russia) Zenit Saint Petersburg	19	17	47,168	2,775
4	(Israel) Maccabi Playtika Tel Aviv	17	6	10,600	1,767
5	(France) LDLC ASVEL	17	1	970	970
6	(Italy) AX Armani Exchange Milan	20	2	1,617	809
7	(Russia) Khimki	17	10	7,849	785
8	(Germany) ALBA Berlin	17	1	599	599
9	(Spain) TD Systems Baskonia	17	2	1,000	500
10	(Spain) Valencia Basket	17	3	1,179	393
11	(Turkey) Fenerbahçe Beko	18	12	3,210	268
12	(Serbia) Crvena zvezda mts	17	1	183	183
13	(Greece) Olympiacos	17	0	0	n/a
13	(Greece) Panathinaikos OPAP	17	0	0	n/a
15	(Germany) Bayern Munich	19	0	0	n/a
15	(Spain) Real Madrid	19	0	0	n/a
17	(Turkey) Anadolu Efes	20	0	0	n/a
17	(Spain) Barcelona	20	0	0	n/a

Source: EuroLeague

=== Top 10 ===
Pos.	Round	Game	Home team	Visitor	Attendance	Ref.
1	Playoffs	3	(Russia) Zenit Saint Petersburg	(Spain) Barcelona	5,187	
2	Regular Season	5	(Lithuania) Žalgiris	(Spain) Valencia Basket	5,131	
3	Playoffs	2	(Russia) CSKA Moscow	(Turkey) Fenerbahçe Beko	5,128	
4	Regular Season	4	(Lithuania) Žalgiris	(Turkey) Anadolu Efes	5,011	
5	Playoffs	4	(Russia) Zenit Saint Petersburg	(Spain) Barcelona	4,626	
6	Regular Season	23	(Russia) CSKA Moscow	(Germany) Bayern Munich	4,516	
7	Regular Season	31	(Russia) CSKA Moscow	(Serbia) Crvena zvezda mts	4,402	
8	Regular Season	29	(Russia) CSKA Moscow	(Italy) AX Armani Exchange Milan	4,297	
9	Regular Season	21	(Russia) CSKA Moscow	(Turkey) Fenerbahçe Beko	4,277	
10	Regular Season	32	(Russia) Zenit Saint Petersburg	(Russia) CSKA Moscow	4,152	

== Awards ==
All official awards of the 2020–21 EuroLeague.

=== EuroLeague MVP ===
- (Serbia) Vasilije Micić ( (Turkey) Anadolu Efes)

=== EuroLeague Final Four MVP ===
- (Serbia) Vasilije Micić ( (Turkey) Anadolu Efes)

=== All-EuroLeague Teams ===
Pos.	First Team		Second Team	
G	(Canada) Kevin Pangos	(Russia) Zenit Saint Petersburg	(Turkey) Shane Larkin	(Turkey) Anadolu Efes
G	(Serbia) Vasilije Micić	(Turkey) Anadolu Efes	(France) Nando De Colo	(Turkey) Fenerbahçe
F	(Serbia) Vladimir Lučić	(Germany) Bayern Munich	(United States) Will Clyburn	(Russia) CSKA Moscow
F	(Spain) Nikola Mirotić	(Spain) Barcelona	(Denmark) Shavon Shields	(Italy) A|X Armani Exchange Milan
C	(Cape Verde) Edy Tavares	(Spain) Real Madrid	(Uganda) Brandon Davies	(Spain) Barcelona

=== Alphonso Ford Top Scorer Trophy ===
- (Russia) Alexey Shved ( (Russia) Khimki)

=== Best Defender ===
- (Cape Verde) Edy Tavares ( (Spain) Real Madrid)

=== Rising Star ===
- (Spain) Usman Garuba ( (Spain) Real Madrid)

=== Coach of the Year ===
- (Turkey) Ergin Ataman ( (Turkey) Anadolu Efes)

=== MVP of the Round ===
Regular season

Round	Player	Team	PIR	Ref.
1	(United States) Pierriá Henry	(Spain) TD Systems Baskonia	32	
2	(United States) Jordan Loyd	(Serbia) Crvena zvezda mts	34	
3–4	(Serbia) Vladimir Lučić	(Germany) Bayern Munich	29	
5	(Serbia) Nemanja Nedović	(Greece) Panathinaikos OPAP	28	
6	(Spain) Nikola Mirotić	(Spain) Barcelona	27	
6	(Lithuania) Marius Grigonis	(Lithuania) Žalgiris	27	
7	(France) Rodrigue Beaubois	(Turkey) Anadolu Efes	36	
8	(Serbia) Vladimir Lučić (2)	(Germany) Bayern Munich	35	
9–10	(United States) Mike James	(Russia) CSKA Moscow	32	
11	(United States) Luke Sikma	(Germany) ALBA Berlin	32	
12	(Cape Verde) Edy Tavares	(Spain) Real Madrid	29	
13	(United States) Mike James (2)	(Russia) CSKA Moscow	51	
14–15	(Cape Verde) Edy Tavares (2)	(Spain) Real Madrid	36	
16	(Turkey) Shane Larkin	(Turkey) Anadolu Efes	37	
17	(United States) Wade Baldwin	(Germany) Bayern Munich	41	
18	(France) Joffrey Lauvergne	(Lithuania) Žalgiris	38	
19–20	(Serbia) Nemanja Nedović (2)	(Greece) Panathinaikos OPAP	33	
21	(Greece) Dinos Mitoglou	(Greece) Panathinaikos OPAP	42	
22–23	(United States) Nick Weiler-Babb	(Germany) Bayern Munich	38	
24	(Serbia) Vasilije Micić	(Turkey) Anadolu Efes	30	
24	(United States) Jalen Reynolds	(Germany) Bayern Munich	30	
25	(Turkey) Shane Larkin (2)	(Turkey) Anadolu Efes	32	
26	(Serbia) Vasilije Micić (2)	(Turkey) Anadolu Efes	44	
27–28	(Sweden) Marcus Eriksson	(Germany) ALBA Berlin	41	
29	(United States) Kevin Punter	(Italy) A|X Armani Exchange Milan	28	
29	(United States) Peyton Siva	(Germany) ALBA Berlin	28	
30	(Bulgaria) Sasha Vezenkov	(Greece) Olympiacos	41	
31	(Serbia) Vasilije Micić (3)	(Turkey) Anadolu Efes	30	
32–33	(United States) Jordan Mickey	(Russia) Khimki	36	
32–33	(Italy) Achille Polonara	(Spain) TD Systems Baskonia	36	
34	(Bulgaria) Sasha Vezenkov (2)	(Greece) Olympiacos	31	

Playoffs

Round	Player	Team	PIR	Ref.
1–2	(Canada) Kevin Pangos	(Russia) Zenit Saint Petersburg	33	
1–2	(Uganda) Brandon Davies	(Spain) Barcelona	33	
3–4	(United States) Will Clyburn	(Russia) CSKA Moscow	38	
5	(Denmark) Shavon Shields	(Italy) A|X Armani Exchange Milan	41	

=== MVP of the Month ===
Month	Round	Player	Team	Ref.
2020
October	1–6	(Lithuania) Marius Grigonis	(Lithuania) Žalgiris	
November	7–11	(United States) Mike James	(Russia) CSKA Moscow	
December	12–17	(Serbia) Nikola Milutinov	(Russia) CSKA Moscow	
2021
January	18–23	(Czech Republic) Jan Veselý	(Turkey) Fenerbahçe Beko	
February	24–26	(Serbia) Nikola Kalinić	(Spain) Valencia Basket	
March	27–33	(Spain) Nikola Mirotić	(Spain) Barcelona	
April	34–PO5	(United States) Will Clyburn	(Russia) CSKA Moscow	

== Statistics ==
=== Individual statistics ===
==== Rating ====
Rank	Name	Team	Games	Rating	PIR
1.	(United States) Mike James	(Russia) CSKA Moscow	27	532	19.70
2.	(Russia) Alexey Shved	(Russia) Khimki	23	450	19.57
3.	(Spain) Nikola Mirotić	(Spain) Barcelona	33	644	19.52

Source: EuroLeague

==== Points ====
Rank	Name	Team	Games	Points	PPG
1.	(Russia) Alexey Shved	(Russia) Khimki	23	455	19.78
2.	(United States) Mike James	(Russia) CSKA Moscow	27	522	19.33
3.	(United States) Jordan Loyd	(Serbia) Crvena zvezda mts	29	502	17.31

Source: EuroLeague

==== Rebounds ====
Rank	Name	Team	Games	Rebounds	RPG
1.	(Cape Verde) Edy Tavares	(Spain) Real Madrid	36	289	8.03
2.	(Italy) Achille Polonara	(Spain) TD Systems Baskonia	33	218	6.61
3.	(Spain) Nikola Mirotić	(Spain) Barcelona	33	196	5.94

Source: EuroLeague

==== Assists ====
Rank	Name	Team	Games	Assists	APG
1.	(Russia) Alexey Shved	(Russia) Khimki	23	178	7.74
2.	(United States) Pierriá Henry	(Spain) TD Systems Baskonia	34	248	7.29
3.	(Canada) Kevin Pangos	(Russia) Zenit Saint Petersburg	39	260	6.67

Source: EuroLeague

==== Blocks ====
Rank	Name	Team	Games	Blocks	BPG
1.	(Cape Verde) Edy Tavares	(Spain) Real Madrid	36	63	1.75
2.	(Greece) Giorgos Papagiannis	(Greece) Panathinaikos	32	51	1.59
3.	(United States) Jordan Mickey	(Russia) Khimki	28	43	1.54

Source: EuroLeague

==== Other statistics ====
Category	Player	Team	Games	Average
Steals	(United States) Pierriá Henry	(Spain) TD Systems Baskonia	34	1.74
Turnovers	(Russia) Alexey Shved	(Russia) Khimki	23	4.26
Fouls drawn	(France) Nando de Colo	(Turkey) Fenerbahçe Beko	32	5.31
Minutes	(Russia) Alexey Shved	(Russia) Khimki	23	32:32
FT %	(Slovakia) Kyle Kuric	(Spain) Barcelona	39	96.08%
2-Point %	(United States) Octavius Ellis	(Greece) Olympiacos	33	72.64%
3-Point %	(Slovakia) Kyle Kuric	(Spain) Barcelona	39	56.20%

=== Individual game highs ===
Category	Player	Team	Statistic	Opponent
Rating	(United States) Mike James	(Russia) CSKA Moscow	51	(Russia) Khimki (Dec 11, 2020)
Points	(Serbia) Nemanja Nedović	(Greece) Panathinaikos OPAP	39	(Israel) Maccabi Playtika Tel Aviv (Dec 22, 2020)
Rebounds	(Serbia) Nikola Milutinov	(Russia) CSKA Moscow	19	(Italy) A|X Armani Exchange Milan (Dec 30, 2020)
Assists	(Greece) Nick Calathes	(Spain) Barcelona	15	(Russia) Khimki (Jan 12, 2021)
Steals	(Cuba) Howard Sant-Roos	(Greece) Panathinaikos OPAP	7	(Serbia) Crvena zvezda mts (Mar 19, 2021)
Steals	(Poland) Mateusz Ponitka	(Russia) Zenit Saint Petersburg	7	(Greece) Panathinaikos OPAP (Apr 12, 2021)
Blocks	(United States) Kevarrius Hayes	(France) LDLC ASVEL	6	(Turkey) Anadolu Efes (Dec 8, 2020)

=== Team statistics ===
Category	Team	Average
Rating	(Turkey) Anadolu Efes	98.51
Points	(Turkey) Anadolu Efes	84.22
Points Allowed	(Spain) Barcelona	73.68
Rebounds	(Russia) CSKA Moscow	35.33
Assists	(Spain) Valencia Basket	20.44
Steals	(Spain) TD Systems Baskonia	8.29
Blocks	(Russia) Khimki	3.26
Turnovers	(Germany) ALBA Berlin	14.79
FT %	(Lithuania) Žalgiris	83.96%
2-Point %	(Spain) Valencia Basket	58.04%
3-Point %	(Lithuania) Žalgiris	42.14%

== See also ==
- 2020–21 EuroCup Basketball
- 2020–21 Basketball Champions League
- 2020–21 FIBA Europe Cup
