= 2018–19 EuroCup Basketball =

2018–19 7DAYS EuroCup^{1}
- Season: 2018–19
- Games played: 186
- Teams: 24

Regular season
- Season MVP: (United States) Luke Sikma

Finals
- Champions: (Spain) Valencia Basket (4th title)
- Runners-up: (Germany) Alba Berlin
- Semi-finalists: (Russia) UNICS (Spain) MoraBanc Andorra
- Finals MVP: (United States) Will Thomas

Awards
- Coach of the Year: (Spain) Aíto García Reneses
- Rising Star: (Lithuania) Martynas Echodas

Statistical leaders
Points	(United States) Peyton Siva	15.2
Rebounds	(United States) Jalen Reynolds	8.1
Assists	(United States) Peyton Siva	7.9
Index Rating	(Serbia) Vladimir Štimac	19.8

Records
- Biggest home win: Crvena zvezda mts 103–67 Germani Brescia Leonessa (12 December 2018)
- Biggest away win: Dolomiti Energia Trento 60–93 Zenit Saint Petersburg (17 October 2018)
- Highest scoring: Alba Berlin 102–109 Cedevita (14 November 2018)
- Winning streak: 15 games Valencia Basket
- Losing streak: 10 games Fiat Torino
- Highest attendance: 12,945; Alba Berlin 95–92 Valencia Basket (12 April 2019)
- Lowest attendance: 602; Fraport Skyliners 74–91 Lokomotiv Kuban (8 January 2019)
- All statistics correct as of 16 April 2019.^{1} Sponsored name, referring to 7DAYS.

The 2018–19 EuroCup Basketball season, also known as 7DAYS EuroCup for sponsorship reasons, is the 17th season of Euroleague Basketball's secondary level professional club basketball tournament. It is the 11th season since it was renamed from the ULEB Cup to the EuroCup, and the third season under the title sponsorship name of 7DAYS.

== Team allocation ==
A total of 24 teams participated in the 2018–19 EuroCup Basketball.

=== Distribution ===
The table below shows the default access list.

	Teams entering in this round	Teams advancing from previous round
Regular season (24 teams)	3 highest-placed teams from Adriatic; 3 highest-placed teams from Russia; 3 highest-placed teams from Spain; 2 highest-placed teams from France; 2 highest-placed teams from Germany; 2 highest-placed teams from Italy; 2 highest-placed teams from Turkey; 1 highest-placed team from Greece; 1 highest-placed team from Lithuania; 1 highest-placed team from Poland; 2 finalists from Basketball Champions League; 2 wild cards	
Top 16 (16 teams)		4 group winners from the regular season; 4 group runners-up from the regular season; 4 group third-placed teams from the regular season; 4 group fourth-placed teams from the regular season
Playoffs (8 teams)		4 group winners from the Top 16; 4 group runners-up from the Top 16

=== Teams ===
The labels in the parentheses show how each team qualified for the place of its starting round:

- 1st, 2nd, 3rd, etc.: League position after Playoffs
- WC: Wild card

Regular season
(Serbia) Crvena zvezda mts (2nd)	(France) LDLC ASVEL (WC)	(Italy) Fiat Torino (WC)	(Spain) Valencia Basket (5th)
(Croatia) Cedevita (3rd)	(Germany) Alba Berlin (2nd)	(Lithuania) Rytas (2nd)	(Spain) MoraBanc Andorra (6th)
(Montenegro) Mornar Bar (4th)	(Germany) Fraport Skyliners (8th)	(Poland) Asseco Arka Gdynia (11th)	(Spain) Unicaja (7th)
(Serbia) Partizan NIS (WC)	(Germany) ratiopharm Ulm (WC)	(Russia) Zenit Saint Petersburg (3rd)	(Turkey) Tofaş (2nd)
(France) Monaco (2nd)	(Italy) Dolomiti Energia Trento (2nd)	(Russia) UNICS (4th)	(Turkey) Galatasaray (9th)
(France) Limoges CSP (4th)	(Italy) Germani Brescia Leonessa (4th)	(Russia) Lokomotiv Kuban (5th)	(Turkey) Türk Telekom (WC)

Notes

1. ABA League (ABA): Crvena zvezda mts, Cedevita, Mornar Bar and Partizan NIS qualified through the ABA League.
2. Spain (ESP): MoraBanc Andorra is a club based in Andorra (which does not qualify for European competitions), but participate in European competitions through one of the berths for Spain (any coefficient points they earn count toward Spain).
3. France (FRA): Monaco are a club based in Monaco (which does not qualify for European competitions), but participated in European competitions through one of the berths for France (any coefficient points they earn count toward France).

== Round and draw dates ==
The schedule of the competition is as follows.

Phase	Round	Draw date	First leg	Second leg	Third leg
Regular season	Round 1	5 July 2018	2–3 October 2018		
Regular season	Round 2	5 July 2018	9–10 October 2018		
Regular season	Round 3	5 July 2018	16–17 October 2018		
Regular season	Round 4	5 July 2018	23–24 October 2018		
Regular season	Round 5	5 July 2018	30–31 October 2018		
Regular season	Round 6	5 July 2018	6–7 November 2018		
Regular season	Round 7	5 July 2018	13–14 November 2018		
Regular season	Round 8	5 July 2018	20–21 November 2018		
Regular season	Round 9	5 July 2018	11–12 December 2018		
Regular season	Round 10	5 July 2018	18–19 December 2018		
Top 16	Round 1	5 July 2018	2–3 January 2019		
Top 16	Round 2	5 July 2018	8–9 January 2019		
Top 16	Round 3	5 July 2018	15–16 January 2019		
Top 16	Round 4	5 July 2018	22–23 January 2019		
Top 16	Round 5	5 July 2018	29–30 January 2019		
Top 16	Round 6	5 July 2018	5–6 February 2019		
Playoffs	Quarterfinals	5 July 2018	5 March 2019	8 March 2019	13 March 2019
Playoffs	Semifinals	5 July 2018	19 March 2019	22 March 2019	27 March 2019
Playoffs	Finals	5 July 2018	9 April 2019	12 April 2019	15 April 2019

=== Draw ===
The draw was held on 5 July 2018 at the Mediapro Auditorium in Barcelona.

The 24 teams were drawn into four groups of six, with the restriction that teams from the same country could not be drawn against each other. For this purpose, Adriatic League worked as only one country. For the draw, the teams were seeded into six pots, in accordance with the Club Ranking, based on their performance in European competitions during a three-year period and the lowest possible position that any club from that league can occupy in the draw is calculated by adding the results of the worst performing team from each league.

Pot 1
Team	Pts
(Russia) Lokomotiv Kuban	138
(Serbia) Crvena zvezda mts	134
(Spain) Unicaja	123
(Spain) Valencia Basket	120

Pot 4
Team	Pts
(Turkey) Tofaş	71^{†}
(Turkey) Türk Telekom	71^{†}
(Lithuania) Rytas	59
(Germany) ratiopharm Ulm	53

Pot 2
Team	Pts
(Turkey) Galatasaray	112
(Russia) UNICS	109
(Russia) Zenit Saint Petersburg	96
(Croatia) Cedevita	81

Pot 5
Team	Pts
(France) Limoges CSP	51
(Spain) MoraBanc Andorra	50^{†}
(Germany) Fraport Skyliners	44
(Serbia) Partizan NIS	33^{†}

Pot 3
Team	Pts
(Italy) Dolomiti Energia Trento	76^{†}
(Italy) Fiat Torino	76^{†}
(Italy) Germani Brescia Leonessa	76^{†}
(Germany) Alba Berlin	75

Pot 6
Team	Pts
(Montenegro) Mornar Bar	33^{†}
(Poland) Asseco Arka Gdynia	31^{†}
(France) LDLC ASVEL	28
(France) Monaco	24^{†}

Notes

^† Indicates teams with points applying the minimum for the league they play.

The fixtures were decided after the draw, using a computer draw not shown to public, with the following match sequence:

Note: Positions for scheduling do not use the seeding pots, e.g., Team 1 is not necessarily the team from Pot 1 in the draw.

Round	Matches
Round 1	6 v 3, 4 v 2, 5 v 1
Round 2	1 v 6, 2 v 5, 3 v 4
Round 3	6 v 4, 5 v 3, 1 v 2
Round 4	6 v 2, 3 v 1, 4 v 5
Round 5	5 v 6, 1 v 4, 2 v 3

Round	Matches
Round 6	1 v 5, 2 v 4, 3 v 6
Round 7	4 v 3, 5 v 2, 6 v 1
Round 8	2 v 1, 3 v 5, 4 v 6
Round 9	5 v 4, 1 v 3, 2 v 6
Round 10	3 v 2, 4 v 1, 6 v 5

There were scheduling restrictions: for example, teams from the same city in general are not scheduled to play at home in the same round (to avoid them playing at home on the same day or on consecutive days, due to logistics and crowd control).

== Regular season ==
Location of teams of the 2018–19 EuroCup regular season.
Red: Group A; Green: Group B; Blue: Group C; Yellow: Group D.

In each group, teams played against each other home-and-away in a round-robin format. The group winners, runners-up, third-placed teams and fourth-placed teams advanced to the Top 16, while the fifth-placed teams and sixth-placed teams were eliminated. The rounds were 2–3 October, 9–10 October, 16–17 October, 23–24 October, 30–31 October, 6–7 November, 13–14 November, 20–21 November, 11–12 December, and 18–19 December 2018.

=== Group A ===
Pos	Team	Pld	W	L	PF	PA	PD	Qualification	MON	AND	CZV	ULM	BRE	GAL
1	(France) Monaco	10	7	3	796	757	+39	Advance to Top 16	—	81–73	63–66	84–81	80–86	76–71
2	(Spain) MoraBanc Andorra	10	6	4	852	834	+18	Advance to Top 16	87–80	—	91–80	103–95	110–91	95–87
3	(Serbia) Crvena zvezda mts	10	6	4	825	768	+57	Advance to Top 16	75–91	85–79	—	88–73	103–67	87–57
4	(Germany) ratiopharm Ulm	10	5	5	824	827	−3	Advance to Top 16	65–75	88–80	95–80	—	83–82	103–92
5	(Italy) Germani Brescia Leonessa	10	3	7	780	842	−62		68–80	73–79	69–61	80–97	—	88–65
6	(Turkey) Galatasaray	10	3	7	761	810	−49		85–86	84–73	83–100	77–69	84–76	—

Source: EuroCup Basketball
Legend: Blue = home team win; Red = away team win.
Rules for classification: All points scored in extra period(s) were not counted in the standings, nor for any tie-break situation.

=== Group B ===
Pos	Team	Pld	W	L	PF	PA	PD	Qualification	LOK	ALB	CED	LIM	TOF	ARK
1	(Russia) Lokomotiv Kuban	10	9	1	847	757	+90	Advance to Top 16	—	75–83	80–76	82–64	95–72	96–72
2	(Germany) Alba Berlin	10	7	3	883	835	+48	Advance to Top 16	82–92	—	102–109	84–76	107–91	82–68
3	(Croatia) Cedevita	10	5	5	853	831	+22	Advance to Top 16	81–85	75–73	—	91–71	92–96	94–87
4	(France) Limoges CSP	10	4	6	818	846	−28	Advance to Top 16	64–72	93–102	82–68	—	89–81	103–87
5	(Turkey) Tofaş	10	4	6	891	908	−17		99–105	101–106	94–89	92–98	—	96–79
6	(Poland) Asseco Arka Gdynia	10	1	9	755	870	−115		73–80	64–76	61–78	87–78	77–87	—

Source: EuroCup Basketball
Legend: Blue = home team win; Red = away team win.
Rules for classification: All points scored in extra period(s) were not counted in the standings, nor for any tie-break situation.

=== Group C ===
Pos	Team	Pld	W	L	PF	PA	PD	Qualification	VBC	ASV	PAR	ZEN	TTA	TRE
1	(Spain) Valencia Basket	10	8	2	846	759	+87	Advance to Top 16	—	84–62	79–71	97–89	101–83	87–66
2	(France) LDLC ASVEL	10	7	3	781	732	+49	Advance to Top 16	73–69	—	75–78	89–68	84–63	75–61
3	(Serbia) Partizan NIS	10	4	6	756	771	−15	Advance to Top 16	61–69	78–89	—	89–82	87–72	76–71
4	(Russia) Zenit Saint Petersburg	10	4	6	840	823	+17	Advance to Top 16	104–93	81–84	75–71	—	91–80	99–102
5	(Turkey) Türk Telekom	10	4	6	766	819	−53		67–72	78–83	77–72	81–75	—	84–77
6	(Italy) Dolomiti Energia Trento	10	3	7	745	830	−85		83–95	79–77	82–73	60–93	77–81	—

Source: EuroCup Basketball
Legend: Blue = home team win; Red = away team win.
Rules for classification: All points scored in extra period(s) were not counted in the standings, nor for any tie-break situation.

=== Group D ===
Pos	Team	Pld	W	L	PF	PA	PD	Qualification	UNK	UNI	FSK	RYT	MOR	TOR
1	(Russia) UNICS	10	9	1	846	750	+96	Advance to Top 16	—	87–84	83–80	86–73	90–73	92–78
2	(Spain) Unicaja	10	8	2	897	788	+109	Advance to Top 16	82–80	—	91–64	95–76	111–76	89–68
3	(Germany) Fraport Skyliners	10	6	4	767	762	+5	Advance to Top 16	65–72	78–84	—	65–63	98–75	88–85
4	(Lithuania) Rytas	10	5	5	769	776	−7	Advance to Top 16	81–87	80–72	61–70	—	71–67	86–79
5	(Montenegro) Mornar Bar	10	2	8	772	905	−133		74–97	85–96	83–87	69–92	—	86–83
6	(Italy) Fiat Torino	10	0	10	800	870	−70		72–82	104–105	75–85	96–101	80–84	—

Source: EuroCup Basketball
Legend: Blue = home team win; Red = away team win.
Rules for classification: All points scored in extra period(s) were not counted in the standings, nor for any tie-break situation.

== Top 16 ==
In each group, teams played against each other home-and-away in a round-robin format. The group winners and runners-up advanced to the Playoffs, while the third-placed teams and fourth-placed teams were eliminated. The rounds were 2–3 January, 8–9 January, 15–16 January, 22–23 January, 29–30 January, and 5–6 February 2019.

=== Group E ===
Pos	Team	Pld	W	L	PF	PA	PD	Qualification	ALB	RYT	MON	PAR
1	(Germany) Alba Berlin	6	5	1	487	451	+36	Advance to quarterfinals	—	87–85	83–74	97–74
2	(Lithuania) Rytas	6	3	3	482	460	+22	Advance to quarterfinals	86–94	—	90–68	80–74
3	(France) Monaco	6	2	4	418	457	−39		61–75	75–70	—	68–71
4	(Serbia) Partizan NIS	6	2	4	442	461	−19		78–66	77–78	68–72	—

Source: EuroCup Basketball
Legend: Blue = home team win; Red = away team win.
Rules for classification: All points scored in extra period(s) were not counted in the standings, nor for any tie-break situation.

=== Group F ===
Pos	Team	Pld	W	L	PF	PA	PD	Qualification	ASV	LOK	ULM	FSK
1	(France) LDLC ASVEL	6	5	1	445	411	+34	Advance to quarterfinals	—	72–61	93–89	75–52
2	(Russia) Lokomotiv Kuban	6	4	2	474	423	+51	Advance to quarterfinals	65–67	—	88–76	84–58
3	(Germany) ratiopharm Ulm	6	3	3	485	464	+21		86–68	81–84	—	70–63
4	(Germany) Fraport Skyliners	6	0	6	368	474	−106		58–70	69–92	68–83	—

Source: EuroCup Basketball
Legend: Blue = home team win; Red = away team win.
Rules for classification: All points scored in extra period(s) were not counted in the standings, nor for any tie-break situation.

=== Group G ===
Pos	Team	Pld	W	L	PF	PA	PD	Qualification	VBC	UNI	CZV	LIM
1	(Spain) Valencia Basket	6	6	0	501	458	+43	Advance to quarterfinals	—	85–74	92–76	91–84
2	(Spain) Unicaja	6	3	3	468	485	−17	Advance to quarterfinals	69–72	—	79–74	79–72
3	(Serbia) Crvena zvezda mts	6	2	4	490	485	+5		81–82	105–89	—	83–71
4	(France) Limoges CSP	6	1	5	450	481	−31		74–79	77–78	72–71	—

Source: EuroCup Basketball
Legend: Blue = home team win; Red = away team win.
Rules for classification: All points scored in extra period(s) were not counted in the standings, nor for any tie-break situation.

=== Group H ===
Pos	Team	Pld	W	L	PF	PA	PD	Qualification	UNK	AND	ZEN	CED
1	(Russia) UNICS	6	5	1	507	426	+81	Advance to quarterfinals	—	72–53	68–67	105–70
2	(Spain) MoraBanc Andorra	6	5	1	479	459	+20	Advance to quarterfinals	86–80	—	86–74	87–81
3	(Russia) Zenit Saint Petersburg	6	2	4	456	475	−19		67–82	71–80	—	98–84
4	(Croatia) Cedevita	6	0	6	474	556	−82		83–100	81–87	75–79	—

Source: EuroCup Basketball
Legend: Blue = home team win; Red = away team win.
Rules for classification: All points scored in extra period(s) were not counted in the standings, nor for any tie-break situation.

== Playoffs ==
In the playoffs, teams play against each other must win two games to win the series. Thus, if one team wins two games before all three games have been played, the game that remains is omitted. The team that finished in the higher Top 16 place will play the first and the third (if it is necessary) legs of the series at home. The playoffs involves the eight teams which qualified as winners and runners-up of each of the four groups in the Top 16.

=== Bracket ===
Quarterfinals
(Spain) Valencia Basket	75	71
(Lithuania) Rytas	64	56
(Russia) UNICS	86	59	69
(Russia) Lokomotiv Kuban	66	68	65
(Germany) Alba Berlin	90	101	79
(Spain) Unicaja	91	81	75
(France) LDLC ASVEL	79	79	80
(Spain) MoraBanc Andorra	75	98	82

Semifinals
(Spain) Valencia Basket	69	79
(Russia) UNICS	64	73
(Germany) Alba Berlin	102	87
(Spain) MoraBanc Andorra	97	81

Finals
(Spain) Valencia Basket	89	92	89
(Germany) Alba Berlin	75	95	63

=== Quarterfinals ===
Team 1	Series	Team 2	Game 1	Game 2	Game 3
Alba Berlin (Germany)	2–1	(Spain) Unicaja	90–91	101–81	79–75
LDLC ASVEL (France)	1–2	(Spain) MoraBanc Andorra	79–75	79–98	80–82
Valencia Basket (Spain)	2–0	(Lithuania) Rytas	75–64	71–56	
UNICS (Russia)	2–1	(Russia) Lokomotiv Kuban	86–66	59–68	69–65

=== Semifinals ===
Team 1	Series	Team 2	Game 1	Game 2	Game 3
Alba Berlin (Germany)	2–0	(Spain) MoraBanc Andorra	102–97	87–81	
Valencia Basket (Spain)	2–0	(Russia) UNICS	69–64	79–73	

=== Finals ===
Team 1	Series	Team 2	Game 1	Game 2	Game 3
Valencia Basket (Spain)	2–1	(Germany) Alba Berlin	89–75	92–95	89–63

== Attendances ==
Pos	Team	Total	High	Low	Average	Change
1	(Germany) Alba Berlin	96,555	12,945	6,322	8,046	+3.7%
2	(Spain) Valencia Basket	81,454	8,014	5,519	6,788	+0.5%^{1}
3	(Serbia) Partizan NIS	48,183	6,464	5,250	6,023	+219.4%
4	(Spain) Unicaja	49,195	9,650	2,795	5,466	−24.8%^{1}
5	(France) LDLC ASVEL	52,829	5,560	4,732	5,283	−1.0%
6	(Lithuania) Rytas	46,188	8,421	3,246	5,132	−15.4%
7	(Serbia) Crvena zvezda mts	40,084	5,898	2,896	5,011	−20.2%^{1}
8	(France) Limoges CSP	31,775	4,527	3,510	3,972	−1.5%
9	(Turkey) Türk Telekom	18,485	6,453	1,987	3,697	n/a
10	(Russia) UNICS	40,456	6,193	2,315	3,678	−0.5%
11	(Germany) ratiopharm Ulm	26,271	4,142	2,954	3,284	+3.0%
12	(Russia) Zenit Saint Petersburg	24,940	4,617	1,750	3,118	−22.6%
13	(Russia) Lokomotiv Kuban	27,193	4,262	1,853	3,021	−29.7%
14	(Spain) MoraBanc Andorra	29,775	4,121	1,874	2,878	−8.0%
15	(Italy) Germani Brescia Leonessa	12,805	4,166	1,880	2,561	n/a
16	(Italy) Fiat Torino	12,205	3,430	1,558	2,441	−7.0%
17	(Turkey) Tofaş	11,424	2,465	2,061	2,285	−27.8%
18	(Turkey) Galatasaray	9,708	2,740	1,102	1,942	+57.5%^{1}
19	(Italy) Dolomiti Energia Trento	8,787	1,969	1,620	1,757	+6.1%
20	(France) Monaco	13,841	2,008	1,525	1,730	n/a
21	(Poland) Asseco Arka Gdynia	7,708	2,049	1,287	1,542	n/a
22	(Montenegro) Mornar Bar	7,264	1,859	1,030	1,453	n/a
23	(Croatia) Cedevita	11,399	2,155	1,060	1,425	+21.8%
24	(Germany) Fraport Skyliners	8,721	2,003	602	1,090	n/a
	League total	717,245	12,945	602	3,856	+3.4%

Source: EuroCup
Notes:
1: 2017–18 season average applied to EuroLeague games

== Awards ==
=== 7DAYS EuroCup MVP ===
Player	Team	Ref.
(United States) Luke Sikma	(Germany) Alba Berlin	

=== 7DAYS EuroCup Finals MVP ===
Player	Team	Ref.
(Georgia (country)) Will Thomas	(Spain) Valencia Basket	

=== All–7DAYS EuroCup Teams ===
All–7DAYS EuroCup First Team		All–7DAYS EuroCup Second Team		Ref
Player	Team	Player	Team	Ref
(France) Andrew Albicy	(Spain) MoraBanc Andorra	(United States) Pierriá Henry	(Russia) UNICS	
(United States) Errick McCollum	(Russia) UNICS	(Belgium) Sam Van Rossom	(Spain) Valencia Basket	
(Lithuania) Rokas Giedraitis	(Germany) Alba Berlin	(Jamaica) Dylan Ennis	(Spain) MoraBanc Andorra	
(United States) Luke Sikma	(Germany) Alba Berlin	(France) Mathias Lessort	(Spain) Unicaja	
(Montenegro) Bojan Dubljević	(Spain) Valencia Basket	(Croatia) Miro Bilan	(France) LDLC ASVEL	

=== Coach of the Year ===
Player	Team	Ref.
(Spain) Aíto García Reneses	(Germany) Alba Berlin	

=== Rising Star ===
Player	Team	Ref.
(Lithuania) Martynas Echodas	(Lithuania) Rytas	

=== Regular season MVP ===
Player	Team	Ref.
(United States) Pierriá Henry	(Russia) UNICS	

=== Top 16 MVP ===
Player	Team	Ref.
(Montenegro) Bojan Dubljević	(Spain) Valencia Basket	

=== Quarterfinals MVP ===
Player	Team	Ref.
(United States) Peyton Siva	(Germany) Alba Berlin	

=== Semifinals MVP ===
Player	Team	Ref.
(United States) Peyton Siva	(Germany) Alba Berlin	

=== MVP of the Round ===
Regular Season

Round	Player	Team	PIR	Ref.
1	(Senegal) Maurice Ndour	(Russia) UNICS	41	
2	(Cameroon) Kenny Kadji	(Turkey) Tofaş	34	
3	(Georgia (country)) Giorgi Shermadini	(Spain) Unicaja	34	
3	(United States) Raymar Morgan	(Russia) UNICS	34	
4	(United States) Isaiah Miles	(France) Limoges CSP	31	
5	(United States) Luke Sikma	(Germany) Alba Berlin	31	
6	(Finland) Erik Murphy	(Germany) Fraport Skyliners	35	
7	(Dominican Republic) Sammy Mejía	(Turkey) Tofaş	30	
7	(France) Landing Sané	(Montenegro) Mornar Bar	30	
8	(United States) Justin Cobbs	(Croatia) Cedevita	36	
9	(Croatia) Rok Stipčević	(Lithuania) Rytas	41	
10	(United States) Patrick Miller	(Germany) ratiopharm Ulm	33	

Top 16

Round	Player	Team	PIR	Ref.
1	(France) Andrew Albicy	(Spain) MoraBanc Andorra	37	
2	(United States) Jamel McLean	(Russia) Lokomotiv Kuban	31	
3	(United States) Luke Sikma (2)	(Germany) Alba Berlin	33	
4	(Montenegro) Bojan Dubljević	(Spain) Valencia Basket	29	
5	(Belarus) Artsiom Parakhouski	(Lithuania) Rytas	30	
6	(Serbia) Dragan Apić	(Russia) Lokomotiv Kuban	30	

Quarterfinals

Game	Player	Team	PIR	Ref.
1	(United States) Errick McCollum	(Russia) UNICS	37	
2	(Jamaica) Dylan Ennis	(Spain) MoraBanc Andorra	23	
2	(Lithuania) Rokas Giedraitis	(Germany) Alba Berlin	23	
2	(Russia) Dmitry Kulagin	(Russia) Lokomotiv Kuban	23	
3	(United States) Peyton Siva	(Germany) Alba Berlin	16	

Semifinals

Game	Player	Team	PIR	Ref.
1	(United States) Peyton Siva (2)	(Germany) Alba Berlin	32	
2	(Belgium) Sam Van Rossom	(Spain) Valencia Basket	19	

Finals

Game	Player	Team	PIR	Ref.
1	(Georgia (country)) Will Thomas	(Spain) Valencia Basket	25	
2	(United States) Luke Sikma (3)	(Germany) Alba Berlin	20	
3	(Montenegro) Bojan Dubljević (2)	(Spain) Valencia Basket	27	

== See also ==
- 2018–19 EuroLeague
- 2018–19 Basketball Champions League
- 2018–19 FIBA Europe Cup
