= Will Thomas (basketball) =

American-Georgian basketball player (born 1986)

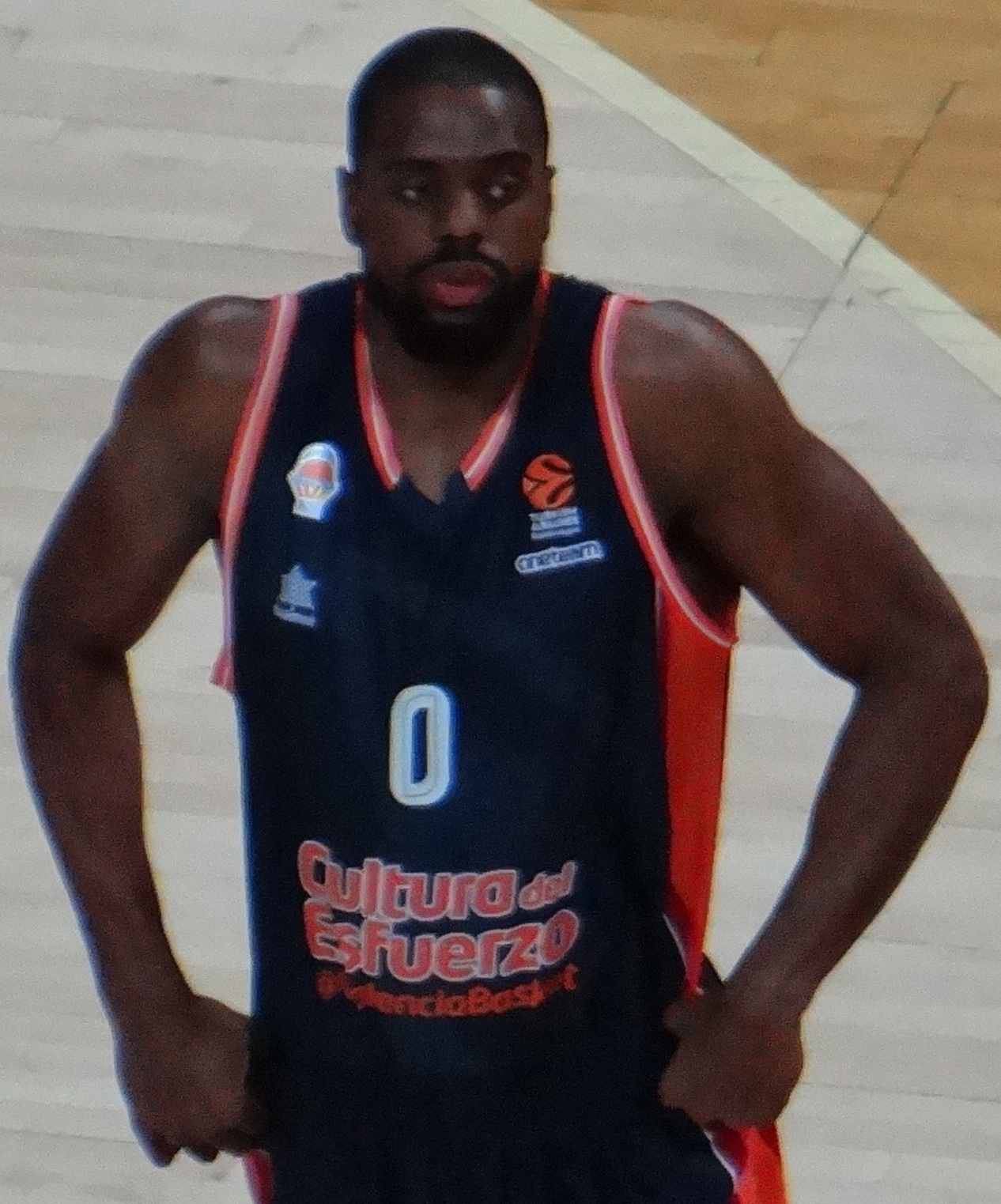

Personal information
- Born: July 1, 1986 (age 40) Baltimore, Maryland, US
- Listed height: 6 ft 7 in (2.01 m)
- Listed weight: 230 lb (104 kg)

Career information
- High school: Mount Saint Joseph (Baltimore, Maryland)
- College: George Mason (2004–2008)
- NBA draft: 2008: undrafted
- Playing career: 2008–2024
- Position: Power forward
- Number: 0, 5, 6, 10, 34

Career history
- 2008–2010: Liege
- 2010–2011: Oostende
- 2011–2012: Armia
- 2012–2013: Karşıyaka
- 2013–2014: Felice Scandone
- 2014–2016: Unicaja Málaga
- 2016–2019: Valencia
- 2019–2021: Zenit
- 2021–2022: AS Monaco Basket
- 2022–2024: Unicaja Málaga

Career highlights
- FIBA Champions League champion (2024); Liga ACB champion (2017); Supercopa winner (2017); EuroCup champion (2019); Belgian League Star of the Coaches (2010); Belgian League MVP (2010); EuroCup Finals MVP (2019)

William Benson Thomas (born July 1, 1986) is an American-Georgian former professional basketball player. Throughout his career, he won the EuroCup and the Champions League as well as the Spanish championship. He played college basketball for George Mason University, and holds a Georgian passport.

== College career ==
As a starter in his sophomore year, Thomas was part of the 2005–06 George Mason Final Four team. During his college career, Thomas was named to the Colonial Athletic Association's All-CAA second team in 2007 and first team in 2008. He was named to the CAA All-Defensive Team for the three straight seasons. In his senior season, he was the runner-up for both the CAA Player of the Year and CAA Defensive Player of the Year.

== Professional career ==
After graduating from George Mason University in the spring of 2008, Thomas was picked to be part of the Washington Wizards summer league roster. He was cut from the team and shortly after signed with Belgacom Liege of the Belgian League. He signed a contract with BC Oostende after playing with Belgacom Liege for 2 years.

For the 2011–12 season, he signed a contract with BC Armia from Georgia. He helped them win the Georgian Cup.

In July 2012, he signed a contract with Pınar Karşıyaka of the Turkish Basketball League. On August 26, 2013, he signed a contract with an Italian league basketball team, Sidigas Avellino.

On July 22, 2014, Thomas signed a one-year deal with the Spanish team Unicaja. In his first EuroLeague season, he averaged 6.9 points and 4.5 rebounds over 24 games played.

On July 14, 2016, he signed a two-year deal with Spanish club Valencia Basket. On July 27, 2018, he signed a one-year contract extension with Valencia Basket, until the end of the 2018–19 season.

On August 7, 2019, Thomas signed with Russian club Zenit Saint Petersburg of the VTB United League and the EuroLeague.

On July 14, 2021, he signed with BC UNICS of the VTB United League. On September 2, 2021, his contract was terminated. Thomas signed with AS Monaco Basket of the LNB Pro A on September 11.

On July 15, 2022, he signed with Unicaja of the Liga ACB. Thomas retired from professional basketball in July 2024.

== Records ==
Thomas is George Mason University's eighth all-time point scorer with 1,564, the third all-time rebounder in men's basketball history with 993 rebounds and has the most games played in team history with 131.

== Career statistics ==
Legend
GP	Games played	GS	Games started	MPG	Minutes per game
FG%	Field-goal percentage	3P%	3-point field-goal percentage	FT%	Free-throw percentage
RPG	Rebounds per game	APG	Assists per game	SPG	Steals per game
BPG	Blocks per game	PPG	Points per game	PIR	Performance index rating
**Bold**	Career high

=== EuroLeague ===
Year	Team	GP	GS	MPG	FG%	3P%	FT%	RPG	APG	SPG	BPG	PPG	PIR
2014–15	Málaga	24	14	20.6	.511	.286	.727	4.5	.9	.3	.1	6.9	9.1
2015–16	Málaga	24	15	23.0	.429	.212	.833	4.6	1.2	.6	.1	8.1	10.1
2017–18	Valencia	30	23	23.6	.473	.288	.744	3.6	1.1	.8	.1	6.2	8.1
2019–20	Zenit	27	21	**27.9**	.507	.342	.759	3.9	**1.4**	**1.0**	.1	**10.3**	13.1
2020–21	Zenit	**39**	**39***	26.4	.542	**.419**	**.897**	**4.9**	**1.4**	.7	**.2**	9.3	**13.4**
2021–22	Monaco	35	28	27.4	**.581**	.408	.862	4.2	1.1	.6	.1	7.5	10.3
Career		179	140	25.1	.511	.335	.819	4.3	1.2	.7	.1	8.1	10.8
