= Pierriá Henry =

American basketball player (born 1993)

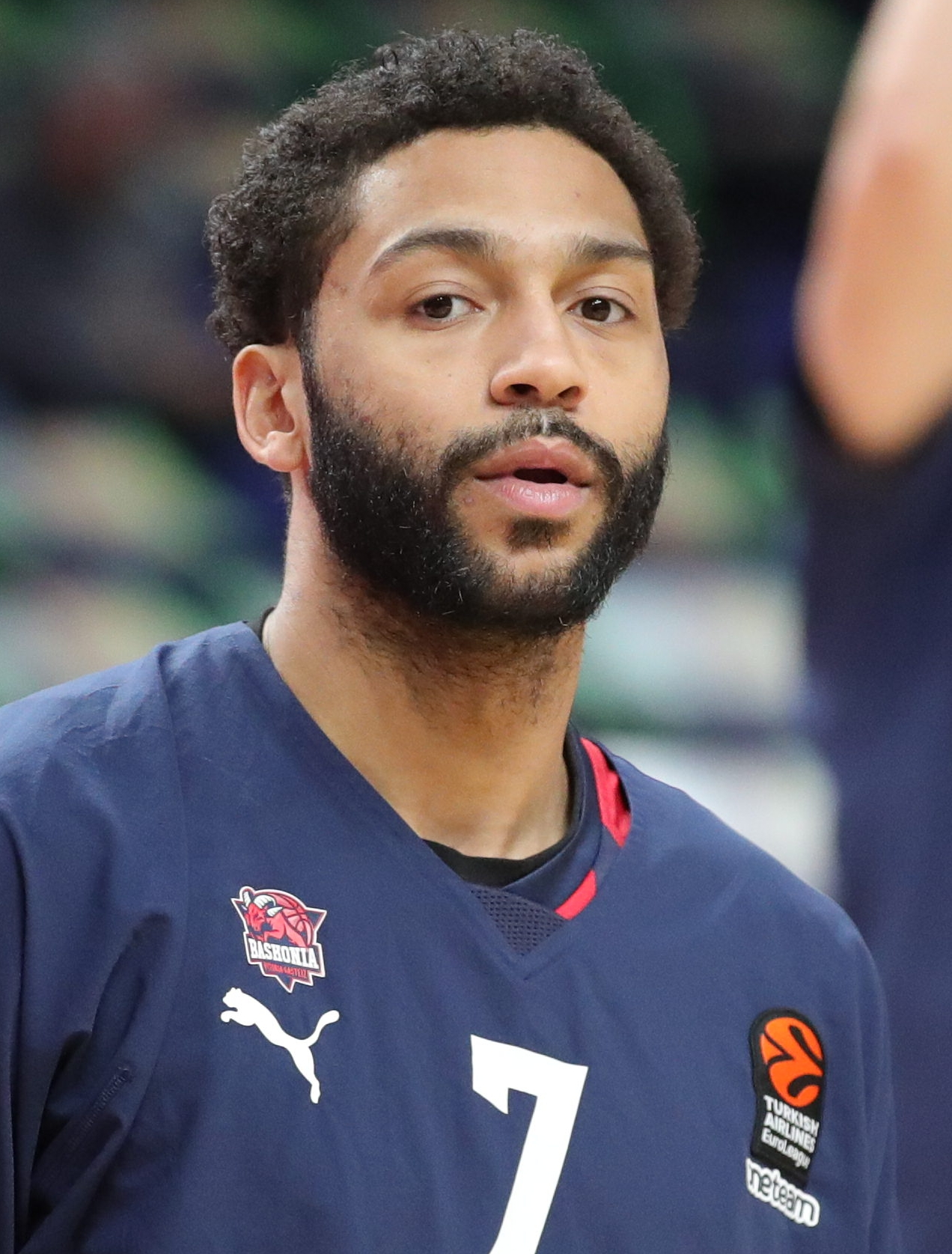
- Henry with Saski Baskonia in 2023

Free agent
- Position: Point guard

Personal information
- Born: January 20, 1993 (age 33) South Charleston, West Virginia, U.S.
- Listed height: 6 ft 5 in (1.96 m)
- Listed weight: 197 lb (89 kg)

Career information
- High school: South Charleston (South Charleston, West Virginia)
- College: Charlotte (2011–2015)
- NBA draft: 2015: undrafted
- Playing career: 2015–present

Career history
- 2015: Vita Tbilisi
- 2015–2016: Ratiopharm Ulm
- 2016–2017: Hapoel Eilat
- 2017–2018: Tofaş
- 2018–2019: UNICS Kazan
- 2019–2021: Baskonia
- 2021–2022: Fenerbahçe
- 2022–2023: Baskonia

Career highlights
- 2× EuroLeague steals leader (2020, 2021); All-EuroCup Second Team (2019); EuroCup Regular Season MVP (2019); All-Spanish League First Team (2021); Spanish League champion (2020); Turkish League champion (2022); Turkish League steals leader (2018); AfroBasket assists leader (2021); 2× Third-team All-C-USA (2014, 2015); 2× C-USA All-Defensive Team (2014, 2015); Atlantic 10 All-Defensive Team (2013); Atlantic 10 All-Rookie Team (2012)
- Stats at Basketball Reference
Medals
Men's basketball
Representing Senegal
AfroBasket
Bronze medal – third place	2021 Rwanda

Pierriá Henry (born January 20, 1993) is a Senegalese-American professional basketball player who last played for Saski Baskonia of the Liga ACB and the EuroLeague. He played college basketball for the University of North Carolina at Charlotte before playing professionally in Georgia, Germany, Israel, Spain, Turkey and Russia. He won a bronze medal at the FIBA AfroBasket 2021 tournament as part of the Senegal national team.

Henry is currently serving a four-year ban set to expire in January 2027 for an anti-doping rule violation.

== Early life and college career ==
Henry attended South Charleston High School in South Charleston, West Virginia, where he averaged 20 points, 12 rebounds, six assists, five steals and two blocks per game as a senior, earning All-State honors twice.

Henry played college basketball for the Charlotte 49ers, where he became the 49ers' all-time leader in assists (555) and steals (293). Henry was named two-time Conference USA All-Third and Defensive teams, Atlantic 10 Conference All-Defensive and Rookie Teams and the Great Alaska Shootout Tournament MVP.

== Professional career ==
=== Vita Tbilisi / Ulm (2015–2016) ===
After going undrafted in the 2015 NBA draft, Henry joined the Houston Rockets for the 2015 NBA Summer League. On September 4, 2015, Henry signed with the Georgian team Vita Tbilisi for the 2015–16 season. However, on December 14, 2015, Henry parted ways with Vita Tbilisi due to financial struggles to join the German team ratiopharm Ulm for the remainder of the season. Henry helped Ulm reach the 2016 BBL Finals, where they eventually lost to Brose Bamberg.

=== Hapoel Eilat (2016–2017) ===
On August 3, 2016, Henry signed with the Israeli team Hapoel Eilat for the 2016–17 season. On June 4, 2017, Henry recorded a career-high 34 points, shooting 4-of-5 from three-point range, along with 5 assists, 5 steals and 3 rebounds in a 94–91 playoff win over Maccabi Rishon LeZion. Henry finished the season as the Israeli League second-leading player in assists with 6.1 per game, he helped Eilat reach the 2017 Israeli League Playoffs, where they eventually were eliminated by Maccabi Rishon LeZion.

=== Tofaş (2017–2018) ===
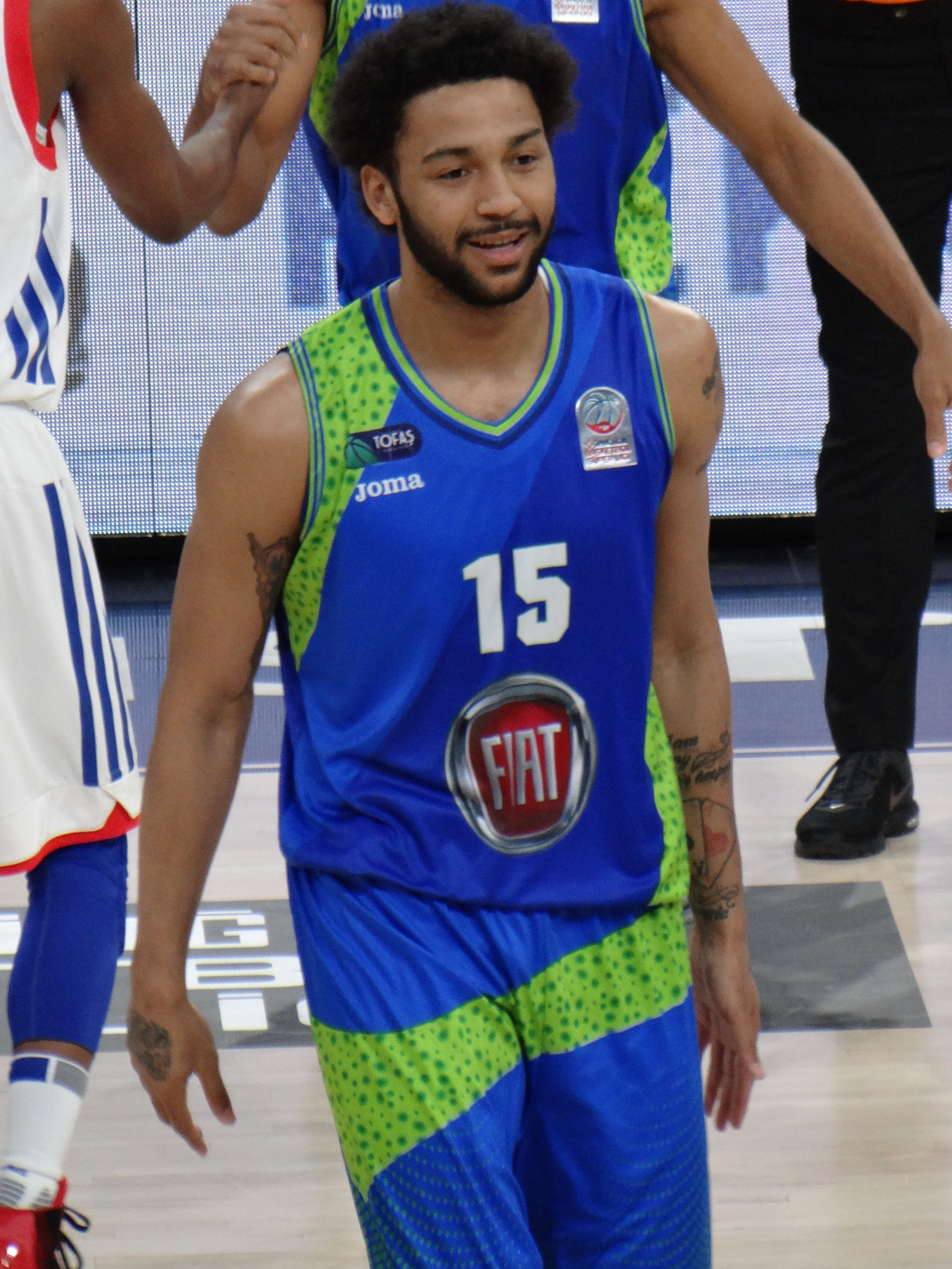
Henry with Tofaş in March 2018

On June 21, 2017, Henry signed with the Turkish team Tofaş for the 2017–18 season. On November 15, 2017, Henry recorded a season-high 26 points, shooting 5-of-8 from three-point range, along with 7 assists and 5 steals in a 100–84 win over his former team ratiopharm Ulm.

Henry helped Tofaş reach the 2018 Turkish League Finals, where they eventually lost to Fenerbahçe. In 53 games played during the 2017–18 season (including the EuroCup and all Turkish competitions), he averaged 10.4 points, 4.1 rebounds, 5.6 assists and 1.7 steals per game, shooting 40.4 percent from three-point range.

=== UNICS Kazan (2018–2019) ===
On June 29, 2018, Henry joined the Boston Celtics for the 2018 NBA Summer League, where he averaged 10 points, 4.8 rebounds, 4.5 assists and 2.1 steals in six games played for the Celtics. On July 16, 2018, Henry signed a one-year deal with the Russian team UNICS Kazan. On December 24, 2018, Henry was named the EuroCup Regular Season MVP, averaging PIR of 19.4, which was the highest among all players whose teams reached the Top 16. On March 2, 2019, Henry tied his career-high with 34 points, while shooting 14-of-18 from the field, along with seven assists and four steals in a 98–95 loss to Astana.

Henry helped Kazan reach the 2019 EuroCup semifinals, where they eventually lost to Valencia. On April 4, 2019, he earned a spot in the All-EuroCup Second Team.

On June 21, 2019, Henry parted ways with Kazan.

=== Baskonia (2019–2021) ===
On July 17, 2019, Henry signed a one-year deal with Spanish club Kirolbet Baskonia. He averaged 7.9 points, 3.6 rebounds and 3.4 assists per game in EuroLeague. On July 22, 2020, Henry re-signed with the team.

=== Fenerbahçe (2021–2022); represeting Senegal ===
On June 24, 2021, Henry signed a 1+1 year deal with Turkish side Fenerbahçe.

In June 2021 Henry acquired Senegalese nationality and August, he was part of the Senegalese team that participated in the FIBA AfroBasket 2021 tournament. Senegal won the bronze medal.

=== Return to Baskonia (2022–2023); doping ban ===
On October 12, 2022, Henry signed with the Houston Rockets. However, he was waived three days later.

On October 23, 2022, Henry signed a one-year contract with Saski Baskonia of the Spanish Liga ACB, returning for a second stint with the club. In January 2023, his contract was suspended after Henry was put under investigation by FIBA for providing a fake doping sample. In February 2024, FIBA officially banned him for a total of 48 months with an expiry date of January 2027.

On November 8, 2026, Henry signed a trial deal with Maccabi Tel Aviv of the Israeli Premier League and the EuroLeague.

== Career statistics ==
Legend
GP	Games played	GS	Games started	MPG	Minutes per game
FG%	Field-goal percentage	3P%	3-point field-goal percentage	FT%	Free-throw percentage
RPG	Rebounds per game	APG	Assists per game	SPG	Steals per game
BPG	Blocks per game	PPG	Points per game	PIR	Performance index rating
**Bold**	Career high

=== EuroLeague ===
*	Led the league

Year	Team	GP	GS	MPG	FG%	3P%	FT%	RPG	APG	SPG	BPG	PPG	PIR
2019–20	Baskonia	25	18	24.6	.412	.295	.729	**3.6**	3.4	1.6*	—	7.9	10.4
2020–21	Baskonia	**34**	17	26.8	**.458**	.329	**.814**	3.2	**7.3**	1.7*	.1	**10.5**	**16.0**
2021–22	Fenerbahçe	28	**27**	**28.7**	.383	**.333**	.732	3.4	4.2	**1.8**	.1	7.9	9.6
2022–23	Baskonia	13	1	23.9	.438	.258	.806	2.8	6.2	1.4	**.2**	9.9	14.0
Career		100	63	26.4	.425	.315	.775	3.3	5.3	1.7	.1	9.0	12.5

=== EuroCup ===
Year	Team	GP	GS	MPG	FG%	3P%	FT%	RPG	APG	SPG	BPG	PPG	PIR
2015–16	Ulm	6	2	21.4	.552	.250	.750	3.5	3.2	1.7	**.2**	7.0	11.8
2017–18	Tofaş	10	5	25.3	**.646**	**.429**	**.800**	3.5	4.6	**2.0**	.1	**10.9**	**16.3**
2018–19	UNICS	**21**	**19**	**26.3**	.444	.322	.735	**4.0**	**5.3**	1.5	.1	10.4	14.0
