= Dylan Ennis =

Canadian-Jamaicanbasketball player

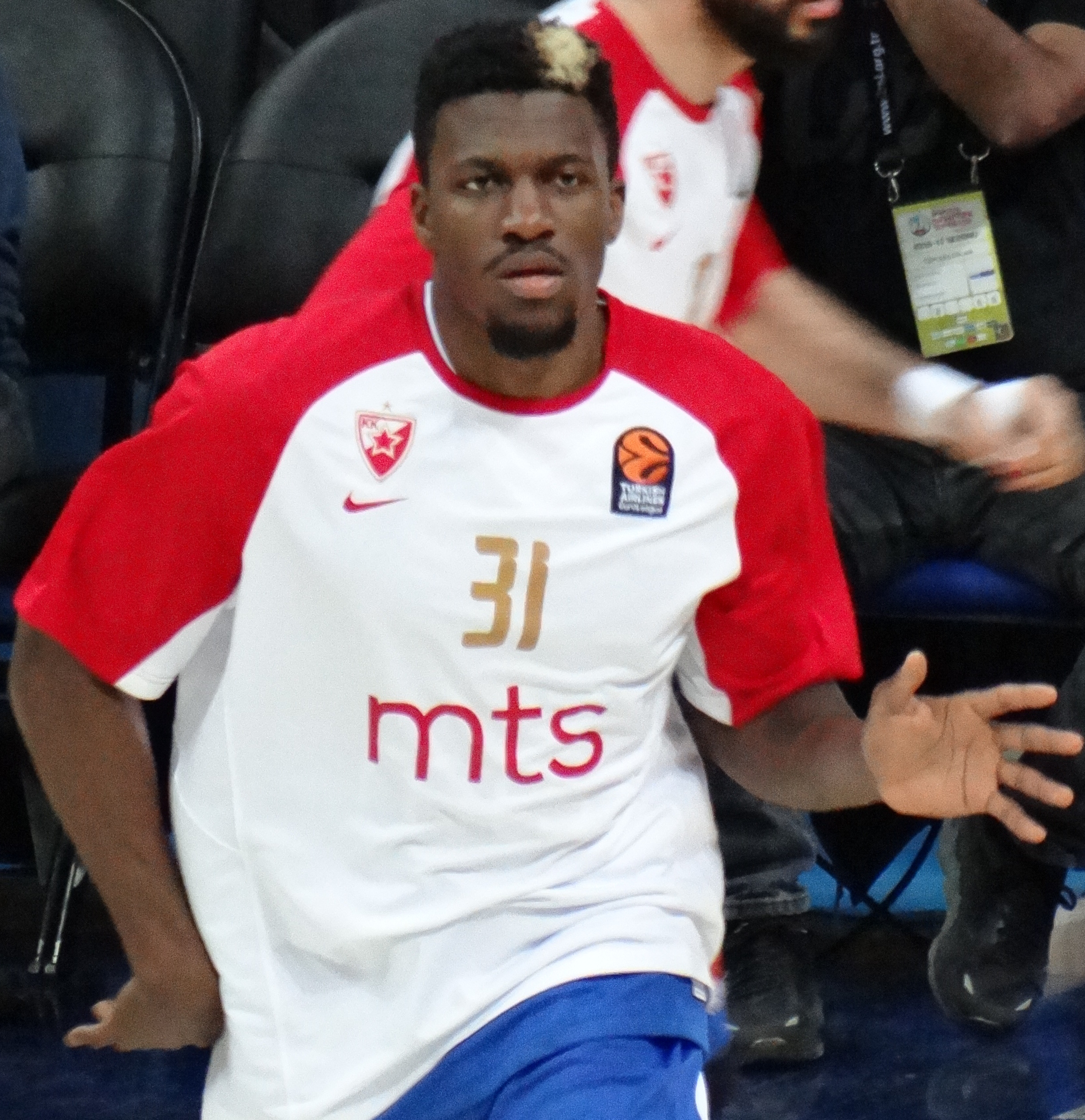
- Ennis with Crvena zvezda in December 2017.

No. 31 – UCAM Murcia
- Position: Point guard / shooting guard
- League: Liga ACB

Personal information
- Born: December 26, 1991 (age 34) Toronto, Ontario, Canada
- Listed height: 1.88 m (6 ft 2 in)
- Listed weight: 102 kg (225 lb)

Career information
- High school: St. Edmund Campion (Brampton, Ontario); Wings Academy (Bronx, New York); Lake Forest Academy (Lake Forest, Illinois)
- College: Rice (2011–2012); Villanova (2013–2015); Oregon (2015–2017)
- NBA draft: 2017: undrafted
- Playing career: 2017–present

Career history
- 2017: Mega
- 2017–2018: Crvena zvezda
- 2018: Zaragoza
- 2018–2019: Andorra
- 2019: Monaco
- 2019–2021: Zaragoza
- 2021–2022: Gran Canaria
- 2022–2023: Galatasaray Nef
- 2023–present: UCAM Murcia

Career highlights
- All-EuroCup Second Team (2019); 3× All-Champions League Second Team (2020, 2021, 2024)

Dylan Jonathan Howell Ennis McIntyre (Serbian Cyrillic: Дилан Џонатан Енис, born December 26, 1991) is a Canadian-Jamaican professional basketball player for UCAM Murcia of the Spanish Liga ACB. He played college basketball for Rice, Villanova, and Oregon. Ennis has played for the Jamaican national team. He also holds Canadian and Serbian citizenship.

== Early life ==
Ennis grew up in Brampton, Ontario. His younger brother, Tyler Ennis, is a former NBA player. As a high school freshman, Dylan Ennis measured only 4'11" but had long arms and big feet. Ennis's stepfather Tony McIntyre, ran CIA Bounce, Toronto's premier AAU program. Dylan attended St. Edmund Campion Secondary School with his brother Brandon, Wings Academy in Bronx, New York, and finally Lake Forest Academy in Illinois. As a senior at Lake Forest he averaged 23 points, 7 assists and 8 rebounds per game and was ranked one of the top 20 high school prospects in Illinois. In one game he scored 41 of his team's 51 points.

== College career ==
Dylan Ennis began his collegiate career at Rice, where he averaged 8.5 points and 4.3 rebounds per game. He was twice selected as the Conference USA Freshman of the Week and was named to the All-Freshman team. He transferred to Villanova after one season, where he had to redshirt a year due to NCAA rules. Ennis broke his foot shortly before he was about to be eligible to play. He averaged 5.1 points in 30 games as a sophomore. In his junior season at Villanova, Ennis started and helped the team win the Big East championship, complete a 33–3 record and receive a No. 1 seed in the NCAA tournament. Ennis scored a then-career-high 19 points twice – against Lehigh and Creighton. He averaged 9.9 points, 3.7 rebounds and 3.5 assists per game.

However, Ennis wanted to play as a pure point guard in the NBA, and he was getting minutes at Villanova as a shooting guard, so he transferred again to Oregon and pursued a master's degree in conflict and dispute resolution. "I was shocked, because usually if a kid comes in and says he wants to leave, there's some problem or he's not happy," Villanova coach Jay Wright said. His arrival filled a key void for Dana Altman's Ducks at the point guard slot, who lost Pac-12 player of the year Joseph Young to graduation. After two games, Ennis broke his foot and missed the remainder of the season, while Villanova won the national championship.

In June 2016, he was granted a sixth year of eligibility. In his redshirt senior season, Ennis was recognizable due to a streak of blonde hair his girlfriend dyed on him as well as his energetic play. He was a key part of a team that reached the Final Four after upsetting Kansas 74–60. At 25, Ennis was one of the oldest players in NCAA Tournament history. He posted averages of 10.9 points, 4.4 rebounds and 3.1 assists in his senior campaign.

== Professional career ==
After going undrafted in the 2017 NBA draft, Ennis signed a summer league contract with the NBA's Oklahoma City Thunder for the July 1–6 Orlando Summer League and the Golden State Warriors for the July 7–17 Las Vegas Summer League.

On July 14, 2017, Ennis scored 35 points during the Warriors' 109–100 Summer League victory over the Los Angeles Clippers. Ennis hit 8 of 11 shots from 3-point range, and had 23 points in 12 first-half minutes. His career-high at Oregon was 22 points.

On July 25, 2017, Ennis signed his first professional contract with Serbian club Mega Bemax. On December 9, 2017, he left Mega and signed with Serbian club Crvena zvezda until the end of the 2019–20 season. In February 2018, he was granted a Serbian passport. On April 16, 2018, his contract with the club was terminated on mutual agreement. The same day, he signed with Spanish club Basket Zaragoza for the remainder of the 2017–18 season. On June 21, 2018, he signed a one-year deal with Morabanc Andorra.

=== Monaco (2019) ===
On July 4, 2019, Ennis signed with AS Monaco of the LNB Pro A.

=== Zaragoza (2019–2021) ===
On November 3, 2019, Ennis signed with Zaragoza. He averaged 11 points and 3 assists per game during the 2019–20 season. On June 9, 2020, Ennis re-signed with the team.

=== Gran Canaria (2021–2022) ===
On July 13, 2021, Ennis signed with Gran Canaria of the Spanish Liga ACB.

=== Galatasaray Nef (2022–2023) ===
On July 13, 2022, Ennis signed with Galatasaray Nef of the Turkish Basketball Super League.

=== UCAM Murcia (2023–present) ===
On June 21, 2023, Ennis signed with UCAM Murcia of the Spanish Liga ACB.

== Career statistics ==
Legend
GP	Games played	GS	Games started	MPG	Minutes per game
FG%	Field-goal percentage	3P%	3-point field-goal percentage	FT%	Free-throw percentage
RPG	Rebounds per game	APG	Assists per game	SPG	Steals per game
BPG	Blocks per game	PPG	Points per game	PIR	Performance index rating
**Bold**	Career high

=== EuroLeague ===
Year	Team	GP	GS	MPG	FG%	3P%	FT%	RPG	APG	SPG	BPG	PPG	PIR
2017–18	Crvena zvezda	18	0	13.0	.356	.400	.871	1.8	1.6	.4	.1	6.5	4.9
Career		18	0	13.0	.356	.400	.871	1.8	1.6	.4	.1	6.5	4.9

=== College ===
Year	Team	GP	GS	MPG	FG%	3P%	FT%	RPG	APG	SPG	BPG	PPG
2011–12	Rice	35	27	26.5	**.435**	.354	.664	4.3	**4.1**	**1.1**	**.6**	8.5
2012–13	Villanova	Redshirt										
2013–14	Villanova	30	0	16.0	.353	.301	**.786**	1.7	1.6	.3	.3	5.1
2014–15	Villanova	36	36	28.1	.417	.363	.619	3.7	3.5	1.0	.4	9.9
2015–16	Oregon	3	0	7.0	.250	.000	–	1.0	.7	.0	.0	.7
2016–17	Oregon	**39**	**39**	**31.7**	.429	**.358**	.737	**4.4**	3.1	**1.1**	.4	**10.9**
Career		143	102	25.7	.416	.347	.691	3.6	3.1	.9	.4	8.6

== National team career ==
Ennis competed with the senior Jamaican national team at the 2013 FIBA Americas Championship.
