= Emin Moğulkoç =

- Moğulkoç in September 2026

Personal information
- Born: 5 March 1970 (age 56) Ankara, Turkey
- Position: Referee
- Officiating career: 1989–present

Emin Moğulkoç (born 5 March 1970) is a Turkish basketball referee. He has been officiating since 1989 and has served in the Basketbol Süper Ligi since 1993.

Moğulkoç has held a FIBA badge since 2003, and officiated at the EuroBasket Women 2011, EuroBasket 2015, and the 2016 Olympic Qualifying Tournaments. He also refereed the 2019 EuroCup Finals, and the 2023 and 2024 EuroLeague Final Four.

In February 2020, he was attacked, together with two other referees, after the EuroLeague Panathinaikos vs. Barcelona game in Athens, in their car on the way to their hotel, by two motorcyclists.
