= Sam Van Rossom =

Belgian basketball player

Sam van Rossom
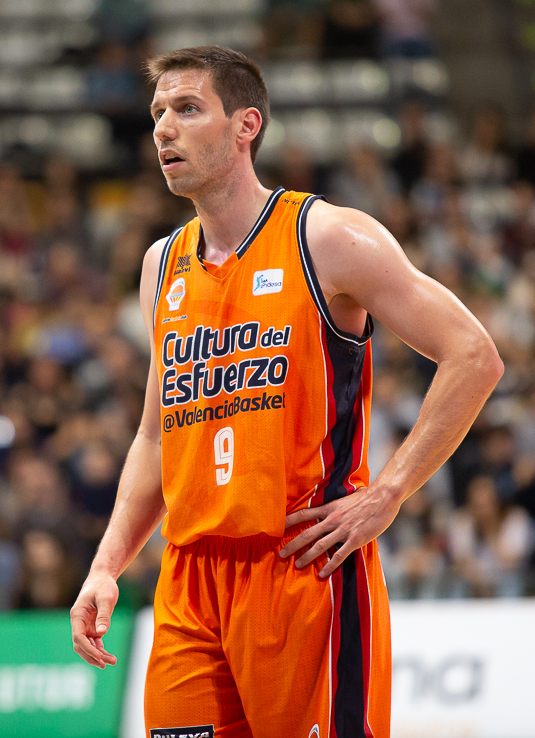
- Sam van Rossom playing for Valencia in 2018

Personal information
- Born: 3 June 1986 (age 40) Ghent, Belgium
- Listed height: 6 ft 2 in (1.88 m)
- Listed weight: 194 lb (88 kg)

Career information
- NBA draft: 2008: undrafted
- Playing career: 2005–2024
- Position: Point guard
- Number: 9, 5

Career history
- 2005–2008: Oostende
- 2008–2010: VL Pesaro
- 2010–2013: Zaragoza
- 2013–2023: Valencia
- 2023–2024: Oostende

Career highlights
- 2x EuroCup champion (2014, 2019); Spanish League champion (2017); All-EuroCup Second Team (2019); BNXT League champion (2024); 3x Belgian League champion (2006, 2007, 2024); Belgian Cup winner (2008); 2x Belgian Player of the Year (2007, 2008)

Sam Tom Bert van Rossom (born 3 June 1986) is a Belgian former professional basketball player. He represented the Belgian national basketball team internationally. Standing at 6 ft 2 in (1.88 m), he played at the point guard position.

== Early life ==
From the age of 6 until he was 16, Van Rossom played for Bobcat Gent, Gent United and Black Bears Gent.

== Professional career ==
After playing for BBC De Pinte in the Belgian third and second division for three seasons, Van Rossom got a place on the roster of BC Oostende in 2005. In the 2007–08 season, he was a major contributor for Oostende as he averaged 11.5 points and 3.2 assists per game.

In 2008 Van Rossom signed with the Italian team Scavolini Pesaro. After two years in Italy, he moved to Spain to play for CAI Zaragoza. His contract was extended after his first season. In 2013, he signed a three-year contract with Valencia Basket.

In September 2017, he re-signed with Valencia for one more season. On 11 July 2020 Van Rossom renewed his contract for another year, with the option of an additional season. On 23 May 2023 Van Rossom announced that he would be leaving Valencia after ten seasons together.

For the 2023–24 season, Van Rossom decided to return to BC Oostende of the BNXT League.

On 7 May 2024, Van Rossom announced his retirement from professional basketball at the end of 2023–24 season.

On 10 May 2025 Valencia Basket retired Sam Van Rossom's number 9 jersey and renamed Court 5 of L’Alqueria del Basket in honor of the Belgian point guard, ranked as the fourth player with the most official games played for Valencia Basket (447), the club's all-time leading assist provider, and the only player to have been voted twice by the fans to win the Endeavour Trophy in the men's category. Van Rossom's number 9 became the fourth retired number in the club's history and Van Rossom the first foreign player to have his jersey retired at Valencia Basket.

== International career ==
Van Rossom has played for the Belgian national basketball team since 2006. He represented Belgium at the EuroBasket 2015 where they lost to Greece in eighth finals with 75–54. Over 6 tournament games, he averaged 12.2 points, 3.7 rebounds and 4.5 assists on 43.5 shooting from the field.

== Career statistics ==
Legend
GP	Games played	GS	Games started	MPG	Minutes per game
FG%	Field-goal percentage	3P%	3-point field-goal percentage	FT%	Free-throw percentage
RPG	Rebounds per game	APG	Assists per game	SPG	Steals per game
BPG	Blocks per game	PPG	Points per game	PIR	Performance index rating
**Bold**	Career high

=== EuroLeague ===
Year	Team	GP	GS	MPG	FG%	3P%	FT%	RPG	APG	SPG	BPG	PPG	PIR
2014–15	Valencia	5	5	30.0	.469	.333	.571	2.4	5.0	1.2	.0	11.4	13.2
Career		5	5	30.0	.469	.333	.571	2.4	5.0	1.2	.0	11.4	13.2
