= Peyton Siva =

American basketball player and coach (born 1990)

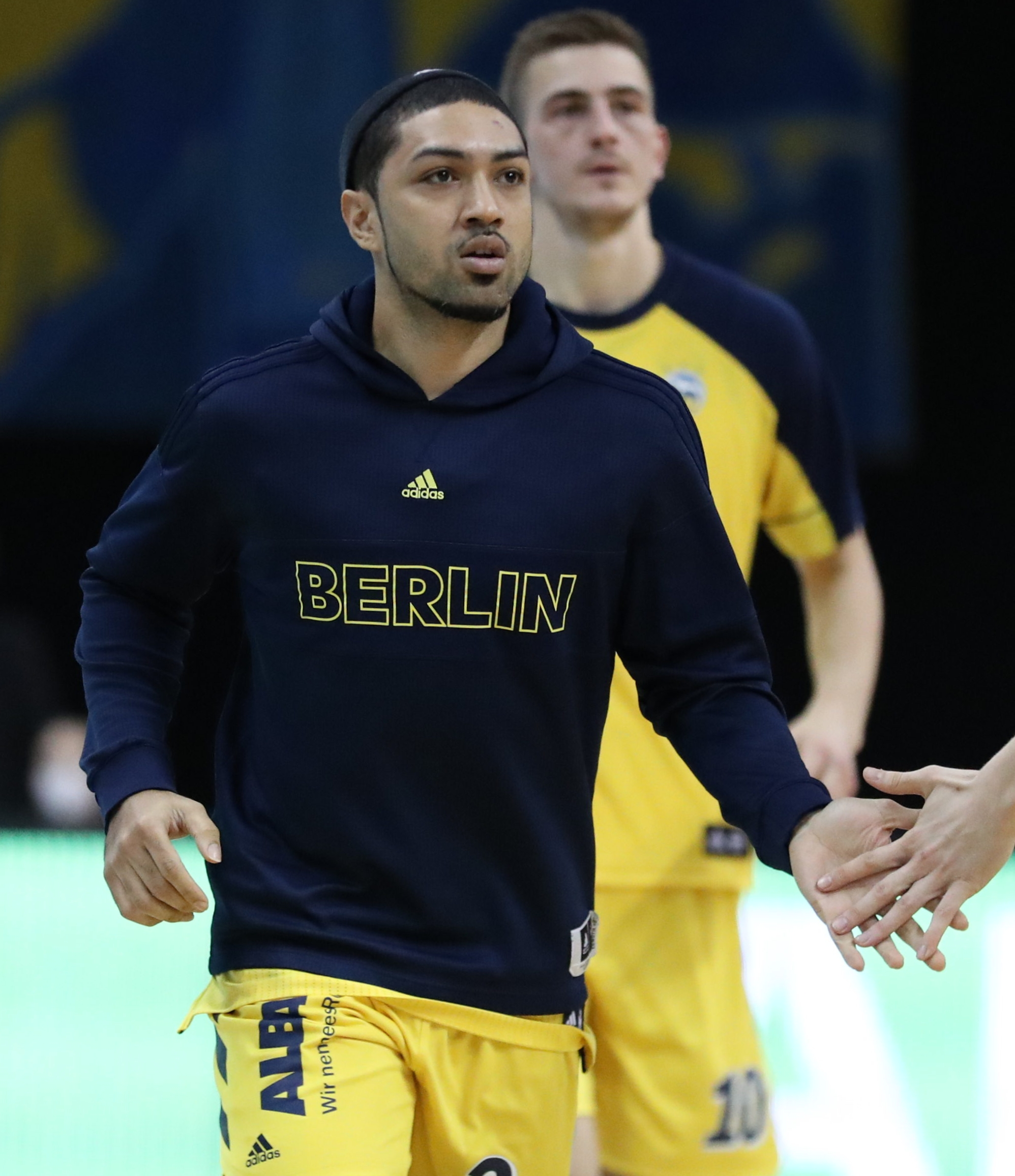
- Siva with Alba Berlin in 2021

St. John's Red Storm
- Title: Assistant coach
- League: Big East

Personal information
- Born: October 24, 1990 (age 36) Seattle, Washington, U.S.
- Listed height: 6 ft 0 in (1.83 m)
- Listed weight: 185 lb (84 kg)

Career information
- High school: Franklin (Seattle, Washington)
- College: Louisville (2009–2013)
- NBA draft: 2013: 2nd round, 56th overall pick
- Drafted by: Detroit Pistons
- Playing career: 2013–2023
- Position: Point guard
- Number: 3, 34, 9, 1, 8
- Coaching career: 2024–present

Career history

Playing
- 2013–2014: Detroit Pistons
- 2013–2014: →Fort Wayne Mad Ants
- 2014–2015: Erie BayHawks
- 2015–2016: Juvecaserta
- 2016–2021: Alba Berlin
- 2021–2022: New Zealand Breakers
- 2022: Panathinaikos
- 2022–2023: Illawarra Hawks

Coaching
- 2024–2026: Louisville (assistant)
- 2026–present: St. John's (assistant)

Career highlights
- EuroCup Top Scorer (2019); 2× Bundesliga champion (2020, 2021); BBL Cup champion (2020); All-Bundesliga First Team (2019); All-Bundesliga Second Team (2018); German All-Star MVP (2018); German All-Star (2018); NCAA champion (2013)*; Frances Pomeroy Naismith Award (2013); Third-team All-Big East (2013); Second-team Academic All-American (2013); 2× Big East tournament MVP (2012, 2013); McDonald's All-American (2009); Third-team Parade All-American (2009); Washington Mr. Basketball (2009); *Later vacated
- Stats at NBA.com
- Stats at Basketball Reference

Peyton Robert Siva Jr. (born October 24, 1990) is an American college basketball coach and former professional player. He is currently an assistant coach at St. John's. He played college basketball for Louisville, leading the school to two Final Fours, including a national championship his senior season. He was drafted by the Detroit Pistons, who selected him with the 56th overall pick in the 2013 NBA draft.

== Early life and education ==
Siva is of Samoan descent and grew up in a troubled Seattle neighborhood. His mother worked three jobs to try to support the family. His father was mostly absent, struggling with drug and alcohol addiction throughout Siva's childhood. The younger Siva successfully talked his father out of killing himself.

Siva, determined to escape the fate of other family members, plunged himself into sports. When he first tried out for youth football, he was too light to play, but managed to make weight. He soon developed a reputation as a relentlessly aggressive athlete in both football and basketball, and as a promising young prospect. Siva also made it a point to avoid alcohol and drugs, and helped many other boys in his neighborhood avoid gang involvement, partially by persuading his mother to let them stay at her house on weekends.

== High school career ==
Siva attended Franklin High School in Seattle. His freshman year he averaged 13.5 points helping Franklin win the 4A championship. As a senior he averaged 18.1 points, 5.3 assists, 3.4 rebounds, and 2.3 steals, leading Franklin to the Class 3A state championship. He was a unanimous selection for AP Washington Player of the Year, was named a McDonald's All-American, and was named Mr. Basketball in the state of Washington.

=== High school awards and honors ===
- 2009 McDonald's All-American team selection
- 2009 Washington Mr. Basketball
- 2009 AP Washington boys high school Player of the Year
- 2009 Seattle Times boys high school Player of the Year
- 2009 Washington Class 3A State Champion
- 2009 Class 3A State Tournament MVP
- 2009 Metro League MVP
- 2009 Third-team Parade All-American

College recruiting
Name	Hometown	School	Height	Weight	Commit date
Peyton Siva; PG	Seattle, WA	Franklin (WA)	6 ft 0 in (1.83 m)	165 lb (75 kg)	May 16, 2008
Peyton Siva; PG	Recruit ratings: Scout: Rivals: (96)				

== College career ==
=== Freshman year ===
During his freshman season Siva averaged 11.3 minutes in 31 games backing up senior starter Edgar Sosa. Hampered by a wrist injury throughout the year he managed to dish out at least 3 assists in 11 games and he scored a career high 14 at West Virginia. Louisville beat #1 Syracuse 78–68 in their final game of the final season at Freedom Hall, before moving to the KFC Yum! Center. The Cardinals finished the season 20–13, and tied for 5th in the Big East with an 11–7 conference record. They lost in the second round of the Big East tournament to Cincinnati 66–69. Louisville received an at-large bid to the 2010 NCAA tournament, earning a 9 seed in the South Region where they lost to 8 seed California 62–77 in the first round.

=== Sophomore year ===
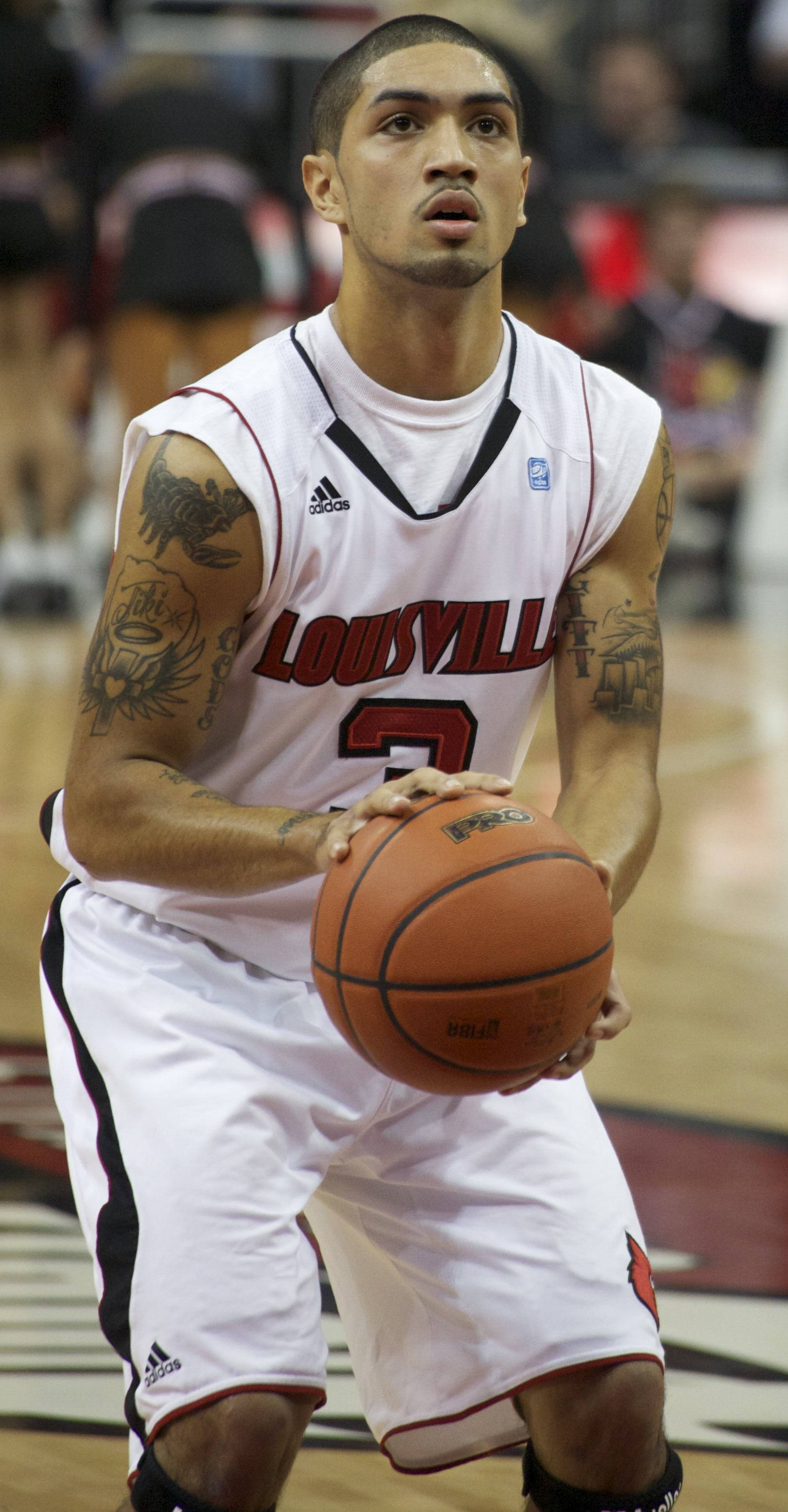
Siva playing with Louisville

In his sophomore season he started 35 games for the Cardinals, averaging 28 minutes a game. He averaged 9.9 points per game and his 5.2 assists per game ranked second best in the Big East. In consecutive games against West Virginia and Connecticut, Siva hit game-winning layups in the final seconds to give Louisville one-point victories. He was an honorable mention selection for the 2011 All-Big East Men's Basketball Team and was named to the 2011 Big East men's basketball tournament All-Tournament Team after averaging 12 points, 7.7 assists, and 5.3 rebounds as the Cardinals reached the championship game. The Cardinals finished the season 25–10, 12–6 in the 2010–11 Big East season tied for 3rd in the conference. They received an at-large bid and a #4 seed in the 2011 NCAA tournament where they were upset in the first round by #13 seeded Morehead State 61–62.

=== Junior year ===
During his junior year in 2011–12, Siva had difficulties on the court early in the season; midway through the season, he had made less than 25% of his three-point attempts, and turned the ball over as much as four times in one half. Cardinals coach Rick Pitino sensed that Siva was getting involved in too many things, and pulled him aside for a talk. Pitino later recalled, "I told him, 'Take a relationship sabbatical — I'll even call your girlfriend for you.' He should only be making time for two things: school and basketball. I told him that we need 100 percent of his focus on the court." From that point, Siva rediscovered his game, and became the Most Outstanding Player of the 2012 Big East tournament. In the tournament he averaged 13.8 points and 5.8 assists per game. Louisville advanced to the Final Four of the 2012 NCAA tournament, upsetting #1 seed Michigan State 57–44 in the sweet sixteen and defeating #7 seed Florida in the regional final. Before losing in the national semifinals to arch-rival and eventual national champion Kentucky. Siva averaged 9.1 points, 3.2 rebounds, 5.6 assists, and 1.7 steals a game for the Cardinals, who finished the season with a 30–10 record.

=== Senior year ===
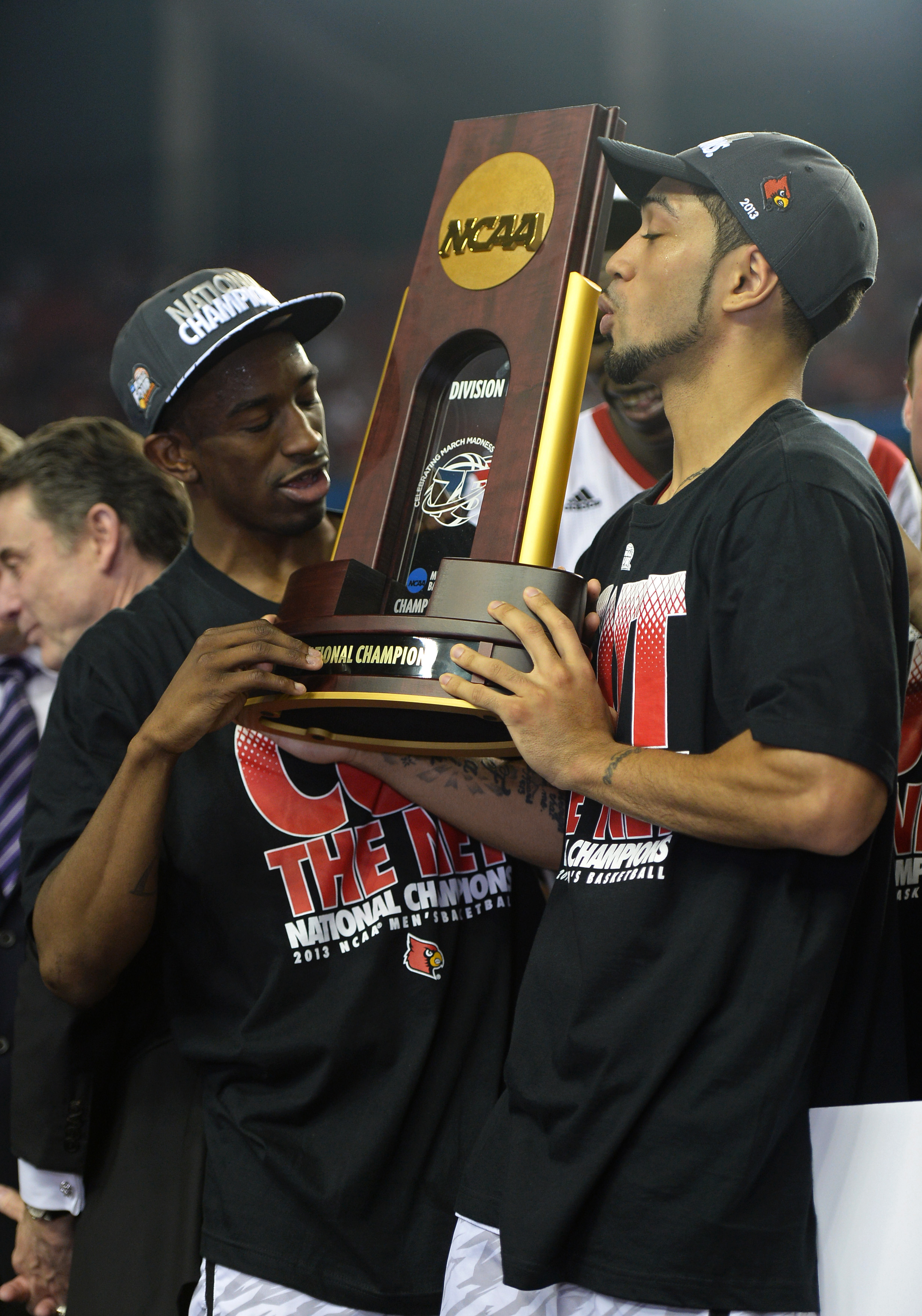
Russ Smith (left) and Siva (right) with the 2013 NCAA Division I men's basketball tournament trophy.

Before the start of the 2012–13 basketball season the Louisville Cardinals men's basketball team was picked to finish 1st in the Big East Conference in polls done by Big East writers and coaches. Siva was selected as the Big East Preseason Player of the Year and to the Big East Preseason first team by both the writers and coaches also. Louisville finished the regular season with a 26–5 record and 14–4 in the Big East to tie for a share of the Big East regular season championship with Georgetown and Marquette, who also finished with a 14–4 conference record. Siva led Louisville to the 2013 Big East tournament championship and was named the tournament's most outstanding player for the second consecutive year. Siva became the second player ever to win this award multiple times; Patrick Ewing accomplished the same feat in 1984 and 1985 Siva had a Big East tournament and school record for steals in a Big East tournament game with seven vs Notre Dame in the semi-finals, it tied Terrence Williams (also from Seattle, WA) the only other Louisville player and 10 others. The seven steals made him Louisville's all-time career leader with 236 steals, at that time, he passed Darrell Griffith's record of 230 he had from 1976 to 1980. Louisville, with a 35–5 record, was selected the #1 overall seed for the 2013 NCAA tournament. Siva was a 2012–13 Academic All-America selection. and was a 2012–13 Senior CLASS Award finalist. Finally, he was named the recipient of the men's Frances Pomeroy Naismith Award, given by the Naismith Memorial Basketball Hall of Fame to the top NCAA Division I senior no taller than 6 ft 0 in (1.83 m). Louisville would go on to beat Michigan and win the 2013 NCAA men's basketball championship.

=== College awards and honors ===
- 2011 All-Big East Honorable Mention Selection
- 2011 Big East All-Tournament team
- 2012 NCAA West Regional all-tournament team selection
- 2012 Big East tournament MVP
- 2013 Big East tournament MVP
- 2013 NCAA National champion
- 2013 Frances Pomeroy Naismith Award
- 2013 American Eagle Outfitters Big East Men's Basketball Scholar-Athlete of the Year
- 2013 Academic All-American
- 2013 All-Big East Third Team

== Professional career ==
=== Detroit Pistons (2013–2014) ===
Siva was drafted 56th overall in the 2013 NBA draft by the Detroit Pistons. In July 2013, he joined the Pistons for the 2013 NBA Summer League. On August 5, 2013, he signed with the Pistons. On December 26, 2013, he was assigned to the Fort Wayne Mad Ants. On January 13, 2014, he was recalled by the Pistons. On January 31, 2014, he was reassigned to the Mad Ants. He was recalled in mid-February 2014.

On July 15, 2014, he was waived by the Pistons following the 2014 NBA Summer League.

=== Orlando Magic (2014) ===
On September 29, 2014, Siva signed with the Orlando Magic. However, he was later waived by the Magic on October 25, 2014. On October 30, 2014, Siva was acquired by the Erie BayHawks as an affiliate player.

=== Juvecaserta Basket (2015–2016) ===
On August 12, 2015, Siva signed with Juvecaserta Basket of the Italian Serie A for the 2015–16 season. Siva led the Serie A in assists, as he had 6.5 per game.

=== Alba Berlin (2016–2021) ===
On June 22, 2016, Siva signed a two-year deal with Alba Berlin. For Berlin, Siva has been the starting point guard and has guided the team to two BBL championships, in 2020 and 2021. In 2018, he was named to the All-Basketball Bundesliga Team.

=== New Zealand Breakers (2021–2022) ===
On August 22, 2021, Siva signed with the New Zealand Breakers for the 2021–22 NBL season. He suffered a grade 2 hamstring tear in the second game of the season was ruled out for up to eight weeks. He returned to action on January 9, 2022.

=== Panathinaikos (2022) ===
On April 28, 2022, Siva signed with Panathinaikos of the Greek Basket League for the rest of the 2021–22 season. In 12 league games, he averaged 2.9 points, 2.4 rebounds and 3.2 assists, playing around 17 minutes per contest.

=== Illawarra Hawks (2022–2023) ===
On October 19, 2022, Siva signed with the Illawarra Hawks for the rest of the 2022–23 NBL season. On January 5, 2023, he was ruled out for the rest of the season after suffering a right shoulder injury. He sustained a high-grade AC joint injury in the Hawks' New Year's Eve game against the Perth Wildcats.

== NBA career statistics ==
Legend
GP	Games played	GS	Games started	MPG	Minutes per game
FG%	Field goal percentage	3P%	3-point field goal percentage	FT%	Free throw percentage
RPG	Rebounds per game	APG	Assists per game	SPG	Steals per game
BPG	Blocks per game	PPG	Points per game	**Bold**	Career high

=== Regular season ===
Year	Team	GP	GS	MPG	FG%	3P%	FT%	RPG	APG	SPG	BPG	PPG
2013–14	Detroit	24	0	9.3	.316	.280	.733	.6	1.4	.4	.0	2.3
Career		24	0	9.3	.316	.280	.733	.6	1.4	.4	.0	2.3

== Personal life ==
Siva is a devout Christian and is involved with Louisville's Fellowship of Christian Athletes. After Siva successfully talked his father out of suicide, the two have become close, according to the younger Siva. His father gave up other drugs shortly after the suicide attempt; while he has continued to struggle with alcohol, family members say his condition has steadily improved. Every year during his son's college career, his father came to Louisville to spend the season with his son, and was a fixture at Cardinals home games. His siblings have also abandoned their previous criminal activity, and his mother, who had worked three jobs while he was growing up, is now a drug counselor. Siva was one of the top searched college basketball players in his final season at Louisville.

Shortly after his graduation, he married his longtime girlfriend, Patience McCroskey, on July 27, 2013, at Louisville's home arena, the KFC Yum! Center, in a large reception room that overlooks the Ohio River. The wedding was the first to be held at the arena.
