= 2019–20 Saski Baskonia season =

Basketball season

Kirolbet Baskonia
2019–20 season
- President: José Antonio Querejeta
- Head coach: Duško Ivanović
- Arena: Buesa Arena
- Liga ACB: 8th (Note: Regular season was cancelled due to the COVID-19 pandemic.)
- Playoffs: Winners
- EuroLeague: 13th (Note: Season was cancelled due to the COVID-19 pandemic.)
- Highest home attendance: Liga ACB: 11,589; Baskonia 74–82 Burgos (22 December 2019) EuroLeague: 13,628; Baskonia 76–74 Barcelona (2 January 2020)
- Lowest home attendance: Liga ACB: 7,625; Baskonia 105–82 Estudiantes (27 September 2019) EuroLeague: 8,725; Baskonia 73–72 Berlin (6 March 2020)
- Average home attendance: Liga ACB: 8,931; EuroLeague: 10,661
- Biggest win: Baskonia 93–60 Bayern (1 November 2019)
- Biggest defeat: Panathinaikos 100–68 Baskonia (28 November 2019)
Home	Away	Third

The 2019–20 season was Kirolbet Baskonia's 61st in existence and the club's 38th consecutive season in the top flight of Spanish basketball and the 20th consecutive season in the EuroLeague. It was the second consecutive season under head coach Velimir Perasović, who signed in November 2018 and was replaced with Duško Ivanović in December 2019.

Times up to 26 October 2019 and from 29 March 2020 were CEST (UTC+2). Times from 27 October 2019 to 28 March 2020 were CET (UTC+1).

== Players ==
=== Squad information ===
Note: Flags indicate national team eligibility at FIBA-sanctioned events. Players may hold other non-FIBA nationalities not displayed.

Kirolbet Baskonia roster
Players
Coaches

Pos.	No.	Nat.	Name	Ht.	Age
PG	6	(United States)	Christon, Semaj	1.91 m (6 ft 3 in)	34 – 1 November 1992
C	12	(Spain)	Diop, Ilimane	2.10 m (6 ft 11 in)	31 – 4 April 1995
SG	30	(Slovenia)	Dragić, Zoran	1.96 m (6 ft 5 in)	37 – 22 June 1989
C	50	(Nigeria)	Eric, Micheal	2.10 m (6 ft 11 in)	38 – 24 August 1988
C	19	(Senegal)	Fall, Youssoupha	2.23 m (7 ft 4 in)	31 – 12 January 1995
PG	17	(Spain)	García, Sergi	1.93 m (6 ft 4 in)	29 – 17 February 1997
SF	29	(Argentina)	Garino, Patricio	2.00 m (6 ft 7 in)	33 – 17 May 1993
SF	5	(Spain)	González, Miguel	2.02 m (6 ft 8 in)	27 – 20 March 1999
PG	15	(Uruguay)	Granger, Jayson	1.88 m (6 ft 2 in)	37 – 15 September 1989
PG	7	(United States)	Henry, Pierriá	1.96 m (6 ft 5 in)	33 – 20 January 1993
SG	11	(Georgia (country))	Janning, Matt	1.95 m (6 ft 5 in)	38 – 22 June 1988
PG	47	(Latvia)	Kurucs, Artūrs	1.89 m (6 ft 2 in)	26 – 19 January 2000
PG	10	(Argentina)	López, Lautaro	1.90 m (6 ft 3 in)	27 – 8 January 1999
PF	33	(Italy)	Polonara, Achille	2.05 m (6 ft 9 in)	34 – 23 November 1991
SF	8	(Lithuania)	Sedekerskis, Tadas	2.00 m (6 ft 7 in)	28 – 17 January 1998
PF	23	(Georgia (country))	Shengelia, Tornike (C)	2.06 m (6 ft 9 in)	35 – 5 October 1991
SF	31	(Denmark)	Shields, Shavon	2.01 m (6 ft 7 in)	32 – 5 June 1994
PG	3	(Argentina)	Vildoza, Luca	1.90 m (6 ft 3 in)	31 – 11 August 1995

Head coach

- (Montenegro) Duško Ivanović

Legend

- (C) Team captain
- Injured

- Roster

=== Transactions ===
==== In ====
No.	Pos.	Nat.	Name	Age	Moving from		Type	Ends	Date	Source
19	C	(Senegal)	Youssoupha Fall	24	SIG Strasbourg	(France)	Loan return	June 2022	6 June 2019	
50	C	(Nigeria)	Micheal Eric	31	Darüşşafaka	(Turkey)	End of contract	June 2021	9 July 2019	
7	PG	(United States)	Pierriá Henry	26	UNICS	(Russia)	End of contract	June 2020	17 July 2019	
22	SG	(Canada)	Nik Stauskas	25	Cleveland Cavaliers	(United States)	End of contract	June 2020	1 August 2019	
33	PF	(Italy)	Achille Polonara	27	Dinamo Sassari	(Italy)	Transfer	June 2021	28 August 2019	
17	PG	(Spain)	Sergi García	22	Valencia Basket	(Spain)	Transfer	June 2020	5 December 2019	
6	PG	(United States)	Semaj Christon	27	Limoges CSP	(France)	Transfer	June 2020	27 January 2020	
30	SG	(Slovenia)	Zoran Dragić	30	ratiopharm Ulm	(Germany)	Transfer	June 2020	30 January 2020	

==== Out ====
No.	Pos.	Nat.	Name	Age	Moving to		Type	Date	Source
9	PG	(Brazil)	Marcelo Huertas	36	Iberostar Tenerife	(Spain)	End of contract	11 June 2019	
7	PF	(Germany)	Johannes Voigtmann	26	CSKA Moscow	(Russia)	End of contract	28 June 2019	
32	SG	(United States)	Darrun Hilliard	26	CSKA Moscow	(Russia)	End of contract	3 July 2019	
17	C	(France)	Vincent Poirier	25	Boston Celtics	(United States)	Transfer	15 July 2019	
8	SF	(Lithuania)	Tadas Sedekerskis	21	Neptūnas	(Lithuania)	Loan	26 July 2019	
21	PF	(United States)	Jalen Jones	26	Capital City Go-Go	(United States)	End of contract	27 October 2019	
22	SG	(Canada)	Nik Stauskas	26	Free agent		Season ending surgery	12 February 2020	

== Pre-season and friendlies ==
=== Friendly matches ===
4 September 2019	Iberostar Tenerife	65–76	Kirolbet Baskonia	Pamplona
19:30	Scoring by quarter: 6–10, 16–24, 19–21, 24–21
	Pts: Singler 12; Rebs: Singler 10; Asts: Díez 2 PIR: Singler 18	Boxscore	Pts: Shengelia 13; Rebs: Fall 10; Asts: Granger 6 PIR: Granger 22	Arena: Navarra Arena; Attendance: 3,800; Referees: Quintas, Lucas, Camaño

7 September 2019	Kirolbet Baskonia	85–71	Élan Béarnais	Anglet
19:30	Scoring by quarter: 22–21, 20–13, 24–18, 19–19
	Pts: Fall 15; Rebs: Fall 9 Asts: Janning, López 5 PIR: Fall 20	Boxscore	Pts: Leslie 15; Rebs: Moore 6 Asts: Moore 10; PIR: Mbodj, Moore 16	Arena: Salle Saint Jean; Referees: José Soares, Eric Sans, Florent Achéen

=== Torneo Liberbank Ciudad de Oviedo ===
11 September 2019	Obras Sanitarias	59–71	Kirolbet Baskonia	Oviedo
18:30	Scoring by quarter: 20–22, 11–14, 16–12, 12–23
	Pts: Barber 17; Rebs: Serres, F. Zurbriggen 4 Asts: Barral, A. Zurbriggen 3 PIR: F. Zurbriggen 15	Boxscore	Pts: Janning 17; Rebs: Diop 10; Asts: three players 2 PIR: Shengelia 21	Arena: Polideportivo de Pumarín; Attendance: 1,000; Referees: Emilio Pérez Pizarro, David Sánchez, Paula Lema

12 September 2019	Real Madrid	72–66	Kirolbet Baskonia	Oviedo
21:00	Scoring by quarter: 9–23, 23–11, 14–21, 26–11
	Pts: Carroll 23; Rebs: Causeur, Mickey 6 Asts: Causeur 3 PIR: Carroll 24	Boxscore	Pts: three players 12; Rebs: Fall 9 Asts: Granger 4 PIR: Fall 17	Arena: Polideportivo de Pumarín; Attendance: 1,300; Referees: Emilio Pérez Pizarro, Vicente Martínez, David Sánchez

=== Euskal Kopa ===
14 September 2019	Kirolbet Baskonia	66–55	RETAbet Bilbao Basket	Barakaldo
21:00	Scoring by quarter: 8–14, 24–15, 21–12, 13–14
	Pts: Shengelia 15; Rebs: Granger 9 Asts: Granger 6 PIR: Granger 23	Boxscore	Pts: Kulboka 16; Rebs: Lammers 6 Asts: Rodríguez, Schreiner 3 PIR: Kulboka 13	Arena: Polideportivo Lasesarre; Attendance: 1,829; Referees: Juan Carlos García González, Rubén Sánchez, Sergio Manuel

=== Trofeo Araba/Álava Saria ===
19 September 2019	Kirolbet Baskonia	78–75	Iberostar Tenerife	Vitoria-Gasteiz
19:30	Scoring by quarter: 16–27, 21–17, 20–11, 21–20
	Pts: Fall 17; Rebs: Fall, Vildoza 6 Asts: Vildoza 5 PIR: Fall 20	Boxscore	Pts: Salin 21; Rebs: Atkins, Huertas 6 Asts: Huertas 10; PIR: Salin 25	Arena: Buesa Arena; Attendance: 5,265; Referees: Juan Carlos García González, Sergio Manuel, Rubén Sánchez

== Competitions ==
=== Overview ===
Competition	First match	Last match	Starting round	Final position	Record							
Competition	First match	Last match	Starting round	Final position	Pld	W	D	L	PF	PA	PD	Win %
Liga ACB	27 September 2019	30 June 2020	Round 1	Winners	30	17	0	13	2,472	2,405	+67	56.67
EuroLeague	4 October 2019	6 March 2020	Round 1	13th	28	12	0	16	2,059	2,155	−96	42.86
Total					58	29	0	29	4,531	4,560	−29	50.00

Source: Competitions

=== Liga ACB ===
==== League table ====
Pos	Team	Pld	W	L	PF	PA	PD	Qualification
6	MoraBanc Andorra	23	13	10	1865	1814	+51	Qualification to playoffs
7	Valencia Basket	23	12	11	1950	1794	+156	Qualification to playoffs
8	Kirolbet Baskonia	23	12	11	1926	1886	+40	Qualification to playoffs
9	Unicaja	23	12	11	1823	1798	+25	Qualification to playoffs
10	San Pablo Burgos	23	12	11	1840	1874	−34	Qualification to playoffs

Source: ACB

==== Results summary ====
Overall						Home					Away				
Pld	W	L	PF	PA	PD	W	L	PF	PA	PD	W	L	PF	PA	PD
23	12	11	1926	1886	+40	6	6	991	942	+49	6	5	935	944	−9

Source: Competitive matches

==== Results by round ====
Round	1	2	3	4	5	6	7	8	9	10	11	12	13	14	15	16	17	18	19	20	21	22	23	24	25	26	27	28	29	30	31	32	33	34
Ground	H	A	H	A	H	A	H	A	H	H	A	H	A	H	A	H	A	A	H	A	H	A	H	A	H	H	A	H	A	A	H	A	H	A
Result	W	L	L	L	W	W	L	W	L	W	L	W	W	L	L	L	W	W	L	L	W	W	W	V	V	V	V	V	V	V	V	V	V	V
Position	1	7	9	13	9	7	9	5	11	7	10	9	6	7	11	12	10	10	10	11	10	8	8											

Source: Competitive matches
A = Away; H = Home; W = Win; L = Loss; V = Void

==== Matches ====
27 September 2019 1	Kirolbet Baskonia	105–82	Movistar Estudiantes	Vitoria-Gasteiz
19:15	Scoring by quarter: 22–16, 25–30, 27–16, 31–20
	Pts: Shengelia 19; Rebs: Eric 6 Asts: Henry, Vildoza 5 PIR: Shengelia 21	Boxscore	Pts: Brizuela 17; Rebs: Dangubić 5 Asts: Scrubb 6 PIR: Brizuela 19	Arena: Buesa Arena; Attendance: 7,625; Referees: Daniel Hierrezuelo, Jorge Martínez, Roberto Lucas

29 September 2019 2	Barça	95–87(OT)	Kirolbet Baskonia	Barcelona
18:30	Scoring by quarter: 24–19, 18–23, 16–21, 22–17, Overtime: 15–7
	Pts: Davies 24; Rebs: Davies 11; Asts: Hanga 7 PIR: Davies 35	Boxscore	Pts: Shengelia 16; Rebs: Fall 12; Asts: Henry 7 PIR: Fall 19	Arena: Palau Blaugrana; Attendance: 6,578; Referees: Benjamín Jiménez Trujillo, Vicente Bultó, Alfonso Olivares

6 October 2019 3	Kirolbet Baskonia	77–78	Unicaja	Vitoria-Gasteiz
18:30	Scoring by quarter: 29–20, 20–16, 11–23, 17–19
	Pts: Janning 16; Rebs: Polonara 6 Asts: Henry, Vildoza 4 PIR: Janning, Vildoza 15	Boxscore	Pts: Adams 23; Rebs: Ejim 8 Asts: Suárez 5 PIR: Adams 20	Arena: Buesa Arena; Attendance: 8,615; Referees: Miguel Ángel Pérez Pérez, Sergio Manuel, Iyán González

13 October 2019 4	RETAbet Bilbao Basket	79–75	Kirolbet Baskonia	Bilbao
17:00	Scoring by quarter: 18–14, 24–26, 15–15, 22–20
	Pts: Balvín 13; Rebs: Balvín 9 Asts: Brown, Rousselle 5 PIR: Balvín 21	Boxscore	Pts: Shengelia 14; Rebs: Diop 7 Asts: Henry 9 PIR: Henry 25	Arena: Bilbao Arena; Attendance: 9,047; Referees: Jordi Aliaga, Luis Castillo, Jacobo Rial

20 October 2019 5	Kirolbet Baskonia	84–73	Coosur Real Betis	Vitoria-Gasteiz
17:00	Scoring by quarter: 13–18, 21–17, 18–24, 32–14
	Pts: Henry 21; Rebs: Shengelia 9 Asts: Henry 6 PIR: Shengelia 28	Boxscore	Pts: Whittington 19; Rebs: Whittington 4 Asts: Rivers 5 PIR: Enechionyia 16	Arena: Buesa Arena; Attendance: 8,126; Referees: Carlos Peruga, Javier Torres, Cristóbal Sánchez

27 October 2019 6	Iberostar Tenerife	78–79	Kirolbet Baskonia	San Cristóbal de La Laguna
20:00	Scoring by quarter: 18–18, 15–20, 28–22, 17–19
	Pts: Huertas 22; Rebs: Díez 9 Asts: Huertas 6 PIR: Shermadini 25	Boxscore	Pts: Henry 24; Rebs: Fall 12; Asts: Henry 3 PIR: Henry 26	Arena: Santiago Martín; Attendance: 5,033; Referees: Emilio Pérez Pizarro, Juan de Dios Oyón, Alberto Baena

3 November 2019 7	Kirolbet Baskonia	89–91	Real Madrid	Vitoria-Gasteiz
18:30	Scoring by quarter: 21–23, 13–24, 36–18, 19–26
	Pts: Shengelia 20; Rebs: Shengelia 7 Asts: Vildoza 5 PIR: Janning 23	Boxscore	Pts: Randolph 22; Rebs: Deck, Garuba 6 Asts: three players 4 PIR: Randolph 26	Arena: Buesa Arena; Attendance: 11,275; Referees: José Antonio Martín Bertrán, Fernando Calatrava, Alberto Sánchez

10 November 2019 8	Monbus Obradoiro	79–92	Kirolbet Baskonia	Santiago de Compostela
12:30	Scoring by quarter: 17–22, 19–21, 23–28, 20–21
	Pts: Kravić 17; Rebs: Kravić 7 Asts: Pozas 11; PIR: Kravić 25	Boxscore	Pts: Shengelia 29; Rebs: Shengelia 7 Asts: Vildoza 4 PIR: Shengelia 32	Arena: Multiusos Fontes do Sar; Attendance: 4,675; Referees: Antonio Conde, Rafael Serrano, Raúl Zamorano

17 November 2019 9	Kirolbet Baskonia	80–92	Montakit Fuenlabrada	Vitoria-Gasteiz
20:00	Scoring by quarter: 19–20, 16–21, 20–26, 25–25
	Pts: Shengelia 26; Rebs: Shengelia 8 Asts: Henry 4 PIR: Henry 24	Boxscore	Pts: Anderson, Rowland 19; Rebs: three players 5 Asts: Bellas 4 PIR: Rowland 26	Arena: Buesa Arena; Attendance: 7,652; Referees: Carlos Cortés, Jorge Martínez, Joaquín García

24 November 2019 10	Kirolbet Baskonia	85–74	Valencia Basket	Vitoria-Gasteiz
18:30	Scoring by quarter: 19–19, 19–13, 33–20, 14–22
	Pts: Shields 17; Rebs: Shields 9 Asts: Henry 5 PIR: Shields 24	Boxscore	Pts: Loyd 20; Rebs: Dubljević 6 Asts: Vives 4 PIR: Dubljević 20	Arena: Buesa Arena; Attendance: 9,335; Referees: Daniel Hierrezuelo, José Ramón García Ortiz, Martín Caballero

30 November 2019 11	MoraBanc Andorra	97–82	Kirolbet Baskonia	Andorra la Vella
20:30	Scoring by quarter: 24–14, 18–17, 24–21, 31–30
	Pts: Hannah 20; Rebs: Musli 8 Asts: Hannah 7 PIR: Hannah 22	Boxscore	Pts: Henry 22; Rebs: Fall, Henry 5 Asts: Henry 4 PIR: Henry 24	Arena: M.I. Govern Andorra; Attendance: 4,230; Referees: Antonio Conde, Óscar Perea, Carlos Merino

8 December 2019 12	Kirolbet Baskonia	87–86	Club Joventut Badalona	Vitoria-Gasteiz
17:00	Scoring by quarter: 25–9, 19–26, 22–18, 21–33
	Pts: Shengelia 19; Rebs: Shengelia 8 Asts: Henry 6 PIR: Shengelia 30	Boxscore	Pts: Prepelič 20; Rebs: Morgan 6 Asts: Prepelič 5 PIR: Prepelič 22	Arena: Buesa Arena; Attendance: 8,532; Referees: Emilio Pérez Pizarro, Juan de Dios Oyón, Cristóbal Sánchez

15 December 2019 13	UCAM Murcia	75–86	Kirolbet Baskonia	Murcia
17:00	Scoring by quarter: 21–15, 16–23, 13–24, 25–24
	Pts: Eddie 14; Rebs: Cățe 8 Asts: Larentzakis 4 PIR: Cățe 19	Boxscore	Pts: Shengelia 19; Rebs: Fall 10; Asts: Shengelia 3 PIR: Shengelia 21	Arena: Palacio de Deportes; Attendance: 5,799; Referees: José Antonio Martín Bertrán, Jordi Aliaga, David Sánchez

22 December 2019 14	Kirolbet Baskonia	74–82	San Pablo Burgos	Vitoria-Gasteiz
20:00	Scoring by quarter: 16–18, 15–14, 25–22, 18–28
	Pts: Stauskas 20; Rebs: Shengelia 10; Asts: Henry 4 PIR: Shields 20	Boxscore	Pts: Benite, McFadden 19; Rebs: Clark, Lima 6 Asts: Bassas 8 PIR: McFadden 21	Arena: Buesa Arena; Attendance: 11,589; Referees: Daniel Hierrezuelo, Javier Torres, Esperanza Mendoza

28 December 2019 15	Casademont Zaragoza	101–80	Kirolbet Baskonia	Zaragoza
20:30	Scoring by quarter: 14–20, 25–11, 33–20, 29–29
	Pts: Ennis 19; Rebs: Seeley 7 Asts: three players 4 PIR: Alocén 19	Boxscore	Pts: Shields 28; Rebs: Eric 8 Asts: García, Shengelia 4 PIR: Shields 24	Arena: Pabellón Príncipe Felipe; Attendance: 10,423; Referees: Juan Carlos García González, José Ramón García Ortiz, Yasmina Alcaraz

5 January 2020 16	Kirolbet Baskonia	79–80	Baxi Manresa	Vitoria-Gasteiz
12:30	Scoring by quarter: 19–22, 20–17, 17–19, 23–22
	Pts: Shields, Stauskas 14; Rebs: Eric, Shengelia 6 Asts: Henry 5 PIR: Shengelia 16	Boxscore	Pts: Cvetković, Kravish 16; Rebs: Kravish 7 Asts: Báez 5 PIR: Kravish 21	Arena: Buesa Arena; Attendance: 8,576; Referees: Carlos Peruga, Rafael Serrano, Arnau Padros

12 January 2020 17	Herbalife Gran Canaria	72–89	Kirolbet Baskonia	Las Palmas
13:00	Scoring by quarter: 28–25, 16–18, 11–25, 17–21
	Pts: Bourousis, Shurna 12; Rebs: Costello 9 Asts: Cook 6 PIR: Costello 18	Boxscore	Pts: Diop 16; Rebs: Shields 9 Asts: Henry 4 PIR: Shields 24	Arena: Gran Canaria Arena; Attendance: 6,083; Referees: José Antonio Martín Bertrán, Luis Castillo, Jacobo Rial

19 January 2020 18	Real Madrid	94–95	Kirolbet Baskonia	Madrid
18:30	Scoring by quarter: 32–18, 6–21, 22–24, 34–32
	Pts: Campazzo 27; Rebs: Tavares 8 Asts: Campazzo 4 PIR: Campazzo 23	Boxscore	Pts: Henry 26; Rebs: Polonara 9 Asts: Stauskas 5 PIR: Henry 27	Arena: WiZink Center; Attendance: 9,852; Referees: Antonio Conde, Sergio Manuel, Vicente Martínez

25 January 2020 19	Kirolbet Baskonia	73–77	MoraBanc Andorra	Vitoria-Gasteiz
18:00	Scoring by quarter: 17–17, 16–20, 18–15, 22–25
	Pts: Shields 18; Rebs: Shengelia 10; Asts: Janning 7 PIR: Shields 21	Boxscore	Pts: Sy 15; Rebs: Musli 11; Asts: Massenat, Todorović 4 PIR: Sy 18	Arena: Buesa Arena; Attendance: 9,055; Referees: Emilio Pérez Pizarro, Alberto Sánchez, David Sánchez

1 February 2020 20	Unicaja	82–72	Kirolbet Baskonia	Málaga
20:30	Scoring by quarter: 14–20, 26–17, 22–20, 20–15
	Pts: Fernández 21; Rebs: Guerrero 7 Asts: Fernández 10; PIR: Fernández 30	Boxscore	Pts: Christon, Shengelia 15; Rebs: Shengelia 7 Asts: Shengelia 4 PIR: Shengelia 25	Arena: Martín Carpena; Attendance: 7,510; Referees: Fernando Calatrava, Jordi Aliaga, Raúl Zamorano

9 February 2020 21	Kirolbet Baskonia	83–69	Monbus Obradoiro	Vitoria-Gasteiz
12:30	Scoring by quarter: 20–20, 25–19, 23–13, 15–17
	Pts: Shengelia 19; Rebs: Diop, Shengelia 7 Asts: García 4 PIR: Shengelia 33	Boxscore	Pts: Kravić 20; Rebs: Kravić 13; Asts: Pozas 6 PIR: Kravić 25	Arena: Buesa Arena; Attendance: 8,645; Referees: Carlos Cortés, Juan de Dios Oyón, Roberto Lucas

29 February 2020 22	Montakit Fuenlabrada	92–98(OT)	Kirolbet Baskonia	Fuenlabrada
20:30	Scoring by quarter: 22–26, 23–16, 27–18, 12–24, Overtime: 8–14
	Pts: Anderson 22; Rebs: Mockevičius 10; Asts: Bellas 5 PIR: Anderson 13	Boxscore	Pts: Shengelia 32; Rebs: Shengelia 13; Asts: Shengelia 5 PIR: Shengelia 44	Arena: Fernando Martín; Attendance: 5,188; Referees: Carlos Peruga, Sergio Manuel, Yasmina Alcaraz

8 March 2020 23	Kirolbet Baskonia	75–58	Iberostar Tenerife	Vitoria-Gasteiz
20:00	Scoring by quarter: 20–21, 17–9, 21–10, 17–18
	Pts: Diop 14; Rebs: Shields 9 Asts: Polonara 3 PIR: Diop 19	Boxscore	Pts: Shermadini 16; Rebs: Shermadini 9 Asts: Huertas 7 PIR: Shermadini 20	Arena: Buesa Arena; Attendance: 8,145; Referees: Juan Carlos García González, Vicente Bultó, Cristóbal Sánchez

24	Valencia Basket	vs.	Kirolbet Baskonia	Valencia
		Boxscore		Arena: La Fonteta

25	Kirolbet Baskonia	vs.	Casademont Zaragoza	Vitoria-Gasteiz
		Boxscore		Arena: Buesa Arena

26	Kirolbet Baskonia	vs.	RETAbet Bilbao Basket	Vitoria-Gasteiz
		Boxscore		Arena: Buesa Arena

27	San Pablo Burgos	vs.	Kirolbet Baskonia	Burgos
		Boxscore		Arena: Coliseum Burgos

28	Kirolbet Baskonia	vs.	Herbalife Gran Canaria	Vitoria-Gasteiz
		Boxscore		Arena: Buesa Arena

29	Baxi Manresa	vs.	Kirolbet Baskonia	Manresa
		Boxscore		Arena: Nou Congost

30	Coosur Real Betis	vs.	Kirolbet Baskonia	Seville
		Boxscore		Arena: San Pablo

31	Kirolbet Baskonia	vs.	UCAM Murcia	Vitoria-Gasteiz
		Boxscore		Arena: Buesa Arena

32	Movistar Estudiantes	vs.	Kirolbet Baskonia	Madrid
		Boxscore		Arena: WiZink Center

33	Kirolbet Baskonia	vs.	Barça	Vitoria-Gasteiz
		Boxscore		Arena: Buesa Arena

34	Club Joventut Badalona	vs.	Kirolbet Baskonia	Badalona
		Boxscore		Arena: Palau Municipal d'Esports

==== Playoffs ====
===== Group stage =====
Pos	Team	Pld	W	L	PF	PA	PD	Qualification
1	Barça	5	4	1	432	400	+32	Qualification to the semifinals
2	Kirolbet Baskonia	5	3	2	402	379	+23	Qualification to the semifinals
3	Unicaja	5	3	2	418	395	+23	
4	Iberostar Tenerife	5	2	3	381	406	−25	
5	Club Joventut Badalona	5	2	3	423	429	−6	
6	RETAbet Bilbao Basket	5	1	4	359	406	−47	

Source: ACB

17 June 2020 1	RETAbet Bilbao Basket	64–87	Kirolbet Baskonia	Valencia
21:30	Scoring by quarter: 23–23, 14–21, 13–28, 14–15
	Pts: Rousselle 12; Rebs: Balvín 10; Asts: Schreiner 6 PIR: Balvín, Martínez 12	Boxscore	Pts: Vildoza 20; Rebs: Shengelia 9 Asts: Henry 6 PIR: Vildoza 30	Arena: La Fonteta; Referees: Daniel Hierrezuelo, Carlos Cortés, Rafael Serrano

19 June 2020 2	Kirolbet Baskonia	79–72	Iberostar Tenerife	Valencia
21:30	Scoring by quarter: 22–15, 22–18, 21–21, 14–18
	Pts: Shengelia 21; Rebs: Shengelia 6 Asts: Shengelia 7 PIR: Shengelia 34	Boxscore	Pts: Shermadini 18; Rebs: Shermadini 11; Asts: Huertas 7 PIR: Shermadini 23	Arena: La Fonteta; Referees: José Antonio Martín Bertrán, Antonio Conde, Arnau Padros

21 June 2020 3	Barça	81–75	Kirolbet Baskonia	Valencia
21:30	Scoring by quarter: 20–11, 22–28, 13–17, 26–19
	Pts: Hanga 15; Rebs: Mirotić 8 Asts: Hanga 7 PIR: Mirotić 22	Boxscore	Pts: Shields 26; Rebs: Eric 8 Asts: Granger, Henry 4 PIR: Shields 22	Arena: La Fonteta; Referees: Carlos Peruga, Emilio Pérez Pizarro, Sergio Manuel

23 June 2020 4	Kirolbet Baskonia	87–86(OT)	Unicaja	Valencia
15:30	Scoring by quarter: 19–19, 25–14, 10–23, 22–20, Overtime: 11–10
	Pts: Henry 14; Rebs: Polonara, Vildoza 7 Asts: Shengelia 7 PIR: Henry 21	Boxscore	Pts: Díaz, Mekel 17; Rebs: Thompson 9 Asts: Adams 3 PIR: Bouteille, Thompson 18	Arena: La Fonteta; Referees: Carlos Peruga, Antonio Conde, Carlos Cortés

25 June 2020 5	Club Joventut Badalona	76–74	Kirolbet Baskonia	Valencia
15:30	Scoring by quarter: 16–13, 23–17, 15–21, 22–23
	Pts: Kanter 18; Rebs: Kanter 7 Asts: Ventura 3 PIR: Kanter 20	Boxscore	Pts: Polonara 18; Rebs: Polonara 7 Asts: three players 3 PIR: Polonara 21	Arena: La Fonteta; Referees: Miguel Ángel Pérez Pérez, Juan de Dios Oyón, José Ramón García Ortiz

===== Semifinals =====
28 June 2020	Valencia Basket	73–75	Kirolbet Baskonia	Valencia
20:00	Scoring by quarter: 17–12, 25–21, 13–23, 18–19
	Pts: Van Rossom 14; Rebs: Tobey 9 Asts: three players 3 PIR: Tobey, Van Rossom 13	Boxscore	Pts: Dragić 21; Rebs: Polonara, Shields 5 Asts: Henry, Vildoza 4 PIR: Dragić 25	Arena: La Fonteta; Referees: Juan Carlos García González, Carlos Peruga, Fernando Calatrava

===== Final =====
30 June 2020	Barça	67–69	Kirolbet Baskonia	Valencia
20:00	Scoring by quarter: 16–17, 23–16, 12–18, 16–18
	Pts: Heurtel 21; Rebs: Davies 8 Asts: Heurtel 5 PIR: Heurtel 25	Boxscore	Pts: Vildoza 17; Rebs: Diop 7 Asts: Henry 3 PIR: Vildoza 20	Arena: La Fonteta; Referees: Carlos Peruga, Daniel Hierrezuelo, Antonio Conde

=== EuroLeague ===
==== League table ====
Pos	Team	Pld	W	L	PF	PA	PD
11	(Greece) Olympiacos	28	12	16	2243	2282	−39
12	(Italy) A|X Armani Exchange Milan	28	12	16	2163	2236	−73
13	(Spain) Kirolbet Baskonia	28	12	16	2059	2155	−96
14	(Serbia) Crvena zvezda mts	28	11	17	2079	2108	−29
15	(France) LDLC ASVEL	28	10	18	2073	2284	−211

Source: EuroLeague
Rules for classification: All points scored in extra period(s) were not counted in the standings, nor for any tie-break situation.

==== Results summary ====
Overall						Home					Away				
Pld	W	L	PF	PA	PD	W	L	PF	PA	PD	W	L	PF	PA	PD
28	12	16	2059	2155	−96	9	5	1047	1047	0	3	11	1012	1108	−96

Source: Competitive matches

==== Results by round ====
Round	1	2	3	4	5	6	7	8	9	10	11	12	13	14	15	16	17	18	19	20	21	22	23	24	25	26	27	28	29	30	31	32	33	34
Ground	A	A	A	H	A	H	A	H	H	H	A	H	A	A	H	A	H	H	A	A	H	A	A	H	H	H	A	H	A	A	H	A	H	H
Result	W	L	L	W	L	W	L	L	W	W	L	L	W	L	L	L	W	L	L	L	W	L	L	W	L	W	W	W	V	V	V	V	V	V
Position	5	7	12	7	9	7	10	10	10	9	9	11	9	11	13	13	12	14	14	15	13	14	16	14	15	13	13	13						

Source: Competitive matches
A = Away; H = Home; W = Win; L = Loss; V = Void

==== Matches ====
4 October 2019 1	Žalgiris (Lithuania)	58–70	(Spain) Kirolbet Baskonia	Kaunas
19:00	Scoring by quarter: 19–19, 11–18, 16–18, 12–15
	Pts: Grigonis, Lekavičius 10; Rebs: Hayes 7 Asts: Grigonis, Hayes 3 PIR: Ulanovas 20	Boxscore	Pts: Shields 19; Rebs: Henry, Polonara 6 Asts: Vildoza 5 PIR: Shields 21	Arena: Žalgirio Arena; Attendance: 15,151; Referees: Christos Christodoulou, Uroš Obrknežević, Sašo Petek

11 October 2019 2	Khimki (Russia)	79–76	(Spain) Kirolbet Baskonia	Mytishchi
19:00	Scoring by quarter: 27–17, 16–22, 19–16, 17–21
	Pts: Shved 21; Rebs: Evans 6 Asts: Shved 8 PIR: Evans 23	Boxscore	Pts: Shengelia 18; Rebs: Shengelia 10; Asts: three players 3 PIR: Henry 24	Arena: Mytishchi Arena; Attendance: 5,841; Referees: Saša Pukl, Boris Ryzhyk, Amit Balak

17 October 2019 3	Fenerbahçe Beko (Turkey)	87–80	(Spain) Kirolbet Baskonia	Istanbul
19:45	Scoring by quarter: 22–22, 17–14, 24–22, 24–22
	Pts: de Colo 39; Rebs: Veselý 7 Asts: Sloukas, Veselý 5 PIR: de Colo 44	Boxscore	Pts: Shengelia 18; Rebs: Polonara, Shengelia 4 Asts: Vildoza 4 PIR: Shengelia 23	Arena: Ülker Sports and Event Hall; Attendance: 10,104; Referees: Matej Boltauzer, Carmelo Paternicò, Gytis Vilius

25 October 2019 4	Kirolbet Baskonia (Spain)	82–66	(Greece) Olympiacos	Vitoria-Gasteiz
21:00	Scoring by quarter: 23–21, 18–15, 17–13, 24–17
	Pts: Shengelia 25; Rebs: Fall 16; Asts: Vildoza 6 PIR: Shengelia 28	Boxscore	Pts: Paul 15; Rebs: Milutinov 10; Asts: Cherry, Spanoulis 5 PIR: Milutinov 20	Arena: Buesa Arena; Attendance: 10,584; Referees: Damir Javor, Mehdi Difallah, Michele Rossi

29 October 2019 5	LDLC ASVEL (France)	66–63	(Spain) Kirolbet Baskonia	Villeurbanne
20:45	Scoring by quarter: 16–23, 14–13, 18–13, 18–14
	Pts: Jekiri 16; Rebs: Jekiri 11; Asts: Lighty 4 PIR: Jekiri 25	Boxscore	Pts: Shengelia 17; Rebs: Fall, Shengelia 7 Asts: Vildoza 4 PIR: Shengelia 25	Arena: Astroballe; Attendance: 5,516; Referees: Christos Christodoulou, Fernando Rocha, Ersan Kartal

1 November 2019 6	Kirolbet Baskonia (Spain)	93–60	(Germany) Bayern Munich	Vitoria-Gasteiz
21:00	Scoring by quarter: 29–10, 23–19, 14–18, 27–13
	Pts: Shengelia 19; Rebs: Fall 8 Asts: Vildoza 6 PIR: Shengelia 28	Boxscore	Pts: Monroe 18; Rebs: Zipser 8 Asts: Flaccadori, Radošević 2 PIR: Monroe 19	Arena: Buesa Arena; Attendance: 10,758; Referees: Luigi Lamonica, Oļegs Latiševs, Tomasz Trawicki

7 November 2019 7	A|X Armani Exchange Milan (Italy)	81–74	(Spain) Kirolbet Baskonia	Assago
20:45	Scoring by quarter: 14–19, 26–15, 16–19, 25–21
	Pts: Della Valle 15; Rebs: Tarczewski 7 Asts: Roll 4 PIR: Della Valle, Roll 19	Boxscore	Pts: Stauskas 15; Rebs: Shengelia 9 Asts: Henry 5 PIR: Shengelia 18	Arena: Mediolanum Forum; Attendance: 6,732; Referees: Robert Lottermoser, Matej Boltauzer, Hugues Thépénier

15 November 2019 8	Kirolbet Baskonia (Spain)	83–113	(Israel) Maccabi Tel Aviv	Vitoria-Gasteiz
21:00	Scoring by quarter: 21–28, 11–27, 26–31, 25–27
	Pts: Shengelia 31; Rebs: Shengelia 8 Asts: Henry, Vildoza 5 PIR: Shengelia 32	Boxscore	Pts: Wilbekin 20; Rebs: Hunter 9 Asts: DiBartolomeo, Wilbekin 6 PIR: Wilbekin 25	Arena: Buesa Arena; Attendance: 10,489; Referees: Borys Ryzhyk, Milan Nedović, Uroš Nikolić

20 November 2019 9	Kirolbet Baskonia (Spain)	80–70	(Russia) CSKA Moscow	Vitoria-Gasteiz
21:00	Scoring by quarter: 24–19, 21–23, 17–17, 18–11
	Pts: Shengelia 22; Rebs: Stauskas 8 Asts: Stauskas 3 PIR: Shengelia 23	Boxscore	Pts: James, Strēlnieks 17; Rebs: Bolomboy 6 Asts: Strēlnieks 5 PIR: Strēlnieks 22	Arena: Buesa Arena; Attendance: 10,439; Referees: Ilija Belošević, Carmelo Paternicò, Piotr Pastusiak

22 November 2019 10	Kirolbet Baskonia (Spain)	70–60	(Russia) Zenit Saint Petersburg	Vitoria-Gasteiz
21:00	Scoring by quarter: 15–18, 19–10, 18–16, 18–16
	Pts: Shengelia 20; Rebs: Diop, Shengelia 7 Asts: Vildoza 4 PIR: Shengelia 24	Boxscore	Pts: Ayón 18; Rebs: Abromaitis 6 Asts: Renfroe 5 PIR: Ayón 19	Arena: Buesa Arena; Attendance: 10,414; Referees: Saša Pukl, Mehdi Difallah, Saulius Racys (Sweden)

28 November 2019 11	Panathinaikos OPAP (Greece)	100–68	(Spain) Kirolbet Baskonia	Athens
20:00	Scoring by quarter: 20–17, 26–19, 26–15, 28–17
	Pts: Fredette 21; Rebs: Thomas 8 Asts: Calathes 9 PIR: Calathes 23	Boxscore	Pts: Fall, Stauskas 12; Rebs: Fall 7 Asts: Henry 9 PIR: Eric 14	Arena: O.A.K.A. Attendance: 11,945; Referees: Robert Lottermoser, Oļegs Latiševs, Gytis Vilius

6 December 2019 12	Kirolbet Baskonia (Spain)	77–102	(Turkey) Anadolu Efes	Vitoria-Gasteiz
21:00	Scoring by quarter: 16–26, 19–29, 18–21, 24–26
	Pts: Shengelia 20; Rebs: Shields 6 Asts: Stauskas 4 PIR: Shengelia 19	Boxscore	Pts: Larkin 24; Rebs: Pleiss 6 Asts: Micić 9 PIR: Larkin 37	Arena: Buesa Arena; Attendance: 11,153; Referees: Christos Christodoulou, Anne Panther, Michele Rossi

12 December 2019 13	Crvena zvezda mts (Serbia)	64–72	(Spain) Kirolbet Baskonia	Belgrade
19:00	Scoring by quarter: 14–20, 17–12, 12–24, 21–16
	Pts: L. Brown 20; Rebs: Kuzmić 8 Asts: L. Brown 5 PIR: L. Brown 22	Boxscore	Pts: Stauskas 22; Rebs: Shengelia 8 Asts: Vildoza 4 PIR: Stauskas 22	Arena: Štark Arena; Attendance: 10,367; Referees: Fernando Rocha, Jurgis Laurinavičius, Amit Balak

17 December 2019 14	Valencia Basket (Spain)	105–77	(Spain) Kirolbet Baskonia	Valencia
21:00	Scoring by quarter: 19–19, 27–17, 23–22, 36–19
	Pts: Dubljević 25; Rebs: Dubljević 5 Asts: Colom 6 PIR: Dubljević 25	Boxscore	Pts: Shields 22; Rebs: Shengelia 8 Asts: Henry 5 PIR: Shields 25	Arena: La Fonteta; Attendance: 7,697; Referees: Milivoje Jovčić, Damir Javor, Ingus Baumanis

19 December 2019 15	Kirolbet Baskonia (Spain)	55–77	(Spain) Real Madrid	Vitoria-Gasteiz
21:00	Scoring by quarter: 13–15, 16–30, 15–12, 11–20
	Pts: Shields 14; Rebs: Fall 9 Asts: Henry, Shengelia 2 PIR: Shields 12	Boxscore	Pts: Mickey 15; Rebs: Mickey 8 Asts: Laprovíttola 6 PIR: Mickey 21	Arena: Buesa Arena; Attendance: 11,648; Referees: Luigi Lamonica, Spiros Gkontas, Milan Nedović

26 December 2019 16	ALBA Berlin (Germany)	81–57	(Spain) Kirolbet Baskonia	Berlin
20:00	Scoring by quarter: 23–15, 18–11, 16–11, 24–20
	Pts: Hermannsson 18; Rebs: Nnoko 11; Asts: Sikma 5 PIR: Giedraitis, Nnoko 23	Boxscore	Pts: Shields 11; Rebs: Fall, Stauskas 6 Asts: Stauskas 4 PIR: Eric 11	Arena: Mercedes-Benz Arena; Attendance: 8,818; Referees: Emin Moğulkoç, Jakub Zamojski, Rain Peerandi

2 January 2020 17	Kirolbet Baskonia (Spain)	76–74	(Spain) Barcelona	Vitoria-Gasteiz
21:00	Scoring by quarter: 21–15, 26–16, 18–23, 11–20
	Pts: Henry 20; Rebs: Shengelia 5 Asts: Henry, Shengelia 3 PIR: Henry 22	Boxscore	Pts: Mirotić 17; Rebs: Davies 6 Asts: Delaney 6 PIR: Mirotić 19	Arena: Buesa Arena; Attendance: 13,628; Referees: Christos Christodoulou, Mehdi Difallah, Sérgio Silva

9 January 2020 18	Kirolbet Baskonia (Spain)	65–79	(Turkey) Fenerbahçe Beko	Vitoria-Gasteiz
21:00	Scoring by quarter: 11–20, 17–22, 17–20, 20–17
	Pts: Shengelia 21; Rebs: Shengelia 7 Asts: Henry 5 PIR: Shengelia 37	Boxscore	Pts: Westermann 21; Rebs: Thomas 8 Asts: Williams 5 PIR: Williams 24	Arena: Buesa Arena; Attendance: 10,613; Referees: Matej Boltauzer, Carmelo Paternicò, Petri Mäntylä

15 January 2020 19	Zenit Saint Petersburg (Russia)	72–66	(Spain) Kirolbet Baskonia	Saint Petersburg
18:00	Scoring by quarter: 23–16, 16–15, 14–18, 19–17
	Pts: Thomas 19; Rebs: Iverson 8 Asts: Renfroe 10; PIR: Thomas 27	Boxscore	Pts: Stauskas 15; Rebs: Eric, Shengelia 6 Asts: Shengelia 6 PIR: Shengelia 24	Arena: Sibur Arena; Attendance: 3,439; Referees: Oļegs Latiševs, Anne Panther, Gytis Vilius

17 January 2020 20	CSKA Moscow (Russia)	94–90	(Spain) Kirolbet Baskonia	Moscow
18:00	Scoring by quarter: 27–25, 25–21, 23–12, 19–32
	Pts: James 33; Rebs: Hines, Voigtmann 5 Asts: Hines 4 PIR: James 34	Boxscore	Pts: Fall 19; Rebs: Fall 10; Asts: Shengelia 5 PIR: Fall 30	Arena: Megasport Arena; Attendance: 6,587; Referees: Robert Lottermoser, Fernando Rocha, Igor Dragojević

23 January 2020 21	Kirolbet Baskonia (Spain)	83–79	(Russia) Khimki	Vitoria-Gasteiz
21:00	Scoring by quarter: 27–25, 20–19, 14–19, 22–16
	Pts: Shields 22; Rebs: Polonara 11; Asts: Henry 8 PIR: Shields 29	Boxscore	Pts: Shved 18; Rebs: Jerebko 6 Asts: Shved 5 PIR: Jerebko 17	Arena: Buesa Arena; Attendance: 11,739; Referees: Borys Ryzhyk, Elias Koromilas, Joseph Bissang

30 January 2020 22	Olympiacos (Greece)	80–70	(Spain) Kirolbet Baskonia	Piraeus
20:00	Scoring by quarter: 25–24, 18–13, 16–14, 21–19
	Pts: Rubit 19; Rebs: Ellis, Rubit 7 Asts: Baldwin 6 PIR: Rubit 23	Boxscore	Pts: three players 14; Rebs: García 6 Asts: Shengelia 7 PIR: Shengelia 18	Arena: Peace and Friendship Stadium; Attendance: 5,730; Referees: Damir Javor, Mehdi Difallah, Amit Balak

4 February 2020 23	Real Madrid (Spain)	70–69	(Spain) Kirolbet Baskonia	Madrid
21:00	Scoring by quarter: 14–19, 23–19, 16–11, 17–20
	Pts: Thompkins 20; Rebs: Thompkins 6 Asts: Campazzo 11; PIR: Campazzo 21	Boxscore	Pts: Shields 14; Rebs: Fall 7 Asts: Christon, Shengelia 4 PIR: Shields 14	Arena: WiZink Center; Attendance: 8,465; Referees: Saša Pukl, Emin Moğulkoç, Petri Mäntylä

6 February 2020 24	Kirolbet Baskonia (Spain)	79–65	(France) LDLC ASVEL	Vitoria-Gasteiz
21:00	Scoring by quarter: 20–13, 19–24, 23–14, 17–14
	Pts: Shengelia 15; Rebs: Shengelia 9 Asts: Christon 11; PIR: three players 15	Boxscore	Pts: Payne 16; Rebs: Jekiri 5 Asts: four players 3 PIR: Payne 16	Arena: Buesa Arena; Attendance: 9,549; Referees: Milivoje Jovčić, Piotr Pastusiak, Petros Papapetrou

20 February 2020 25	Kirolbet Baskonia (Spain)	60–74	(Lithuania) Žalgiris	Vitoria-Gasteiz
21:00	Scoring by quarter: 17–13, 18–17, 10–21, 15–23
	Pts: Christon 17; Rebs: Shields 5 Asts: Shengelia, Shields 5 PIR: Shengelia 14	Boxscore	Pts: Ulanovas 15; Rebs: Ulanovas 7 Asts: Walkup 6 PIR: LeDay 16	Arena: Buesa Arena; Attendance: 10,068; Referees: Matej Boltauzer, Spiros Gkontas, Miloš Koljenšić

27 February 2020 26	Kirolbet Baskonia (Spain)	71–56	(Serbia) Crvena zvezda mts	Vitoria-Gasteiz
21:00	Scoring by quarter: 21–15, 18–13, 15–15, 17–13
	Pts: Shengelia 18; Rebs: Shields 6 Asts: Shields 5 PIR: Shields 23	Boxscore	Pts: Štimac 13; Rebs: Štimac 7 Asts: Baron 4 PIR: Štimac 16	Arena: Buesa Arena; Attendance: 9,445; Referees: Luigi Lamonica, Anne Panther, Marcin Kowalski

4 March 2020 27	Bayern Munich (Germany)	71–80	(Spain) Kirolbet Baskonia	Munich
20:30	Scoring by quarter: 25–21, 16–23, 13–16, 17–20
	Pts: Monroe 18; Rebs: Monroe 6 Asts: Lô 4 PIR: Monroe 29	Boxscore	Pts: Eric 16; Rebs: Three players 4 Asts: Shengelia 5 PIR: Shengelia 18	Arena: Audi Dome; Attendance: 4,345 (tentative); Referees: Jakub Zamojski, Mehdi Difallah, Vasiliki Tsaroucha

6 March 2020 28	Kirolbet Baskonia (Spain)	73–72	(Germany) ALBA Berlin	Vitoria-Gasteiz
21:00	Scoring by quarter: 15–15, 14–24, 19–20, 25–13
	Pts: Shengelia 24; Rebs: Shengelia 7 Asts: Henry 6 PIR: Shengelia 28	Boxscore	Pts: Eriksson 16; Rebs: Cavanaugh 8 Asts: Hermannsson, Sikma 6 PIR: Eriksson, Sikma 14	Arena: Buesa Arena; Attendance: 8,725; Referees: Christos Christodoulou, Sašo Petek, Sebastien Clivaz

29	Maccabi Tel Aviv (Israel)	vs.	(Spain) Kirolbet Baskonia	Tel Aviv
		Boxscore		Arena: Menora Mivtachim Arena

30	Anadolu Efes (Turkey)	vs.	(Spain) Kirolbet Baskonia	Istanbul
		Boxscore		Arena: Sinan Erdem Dome

31	Kirolbet Baskonia (Spain)	vs.	(Italy) A|X Armani Exchange Milan	Vitoria-Gasteiz
		Boxscore		Arena: Buesa Arena

32	Barcelona (Spain)	vs.	(Spain) Kirolbet Baskonia	Barcelona
		Boxscore		Arena: Palau Blaugrana

33	Kirolbet Baskonia (Spain)	vs.	(Spain) Valencia Basket	Vitoria-Gasteiz
		Boxscore		Arena: Buesa Arena

34	Kirolbet Baskonia (Spain)	vs.	(Greece) Panathinaikos OPAP	Vitoria-Gasteiz
		Boxscore		Arena: Buesa Arena

== Statistics ==
Legend
GP	Games played	GS	Games started	MPG	Minutes per game
FG%	Field-goal percentage	3FG%	3-point field-goal percentage	FT%	Free-throw percentage
RPG	Rebounds per game	APG	Assists per game	SPG	Steals per game
BPG	Blocks per game	PPG	Points per game	PIR	PIR per game

=== Liga ACB ===
Player	GP	GS	MPG	2FG%	3FG%	FT%	RPG	APG	SPG	BPG	PPG	PIR
Semaj Christon	4	4	24:11	.611	.333	.625	3.3	2.8	1.3	0.0	9.0	8.3
Ilimane Diop	28	4	14:07	.506	.312	.858	3.4	0.2	0.5	0.9	5.7	7.6
Zoran Dragić	11	1	16:26	.643	.264	.752	1.4	1.4	0.4	0.0	7.1	5.6
Micheal Eric	28	20	15:35	.601	.000	.553	3.6	0.3	0.4	0.7	7.0	6.1
Youssoupha Fall	24	6	12:36	.701	.000	.597	3.9	0.1	0.3	0.6	5.4	6.5
Sergi García	12	1	11:36	.493	.172	.500	1.4	1.8	0.9	0.1	1.9	2.9
Patricio Garino	8	6	25:52	.595	.394	.847	2.6	1.5	0.8	0.9	10.3	10.4
Miguel González	11	1	5:35	.333	.000	1.000	0.3	0.1	0.0	0.2	0.6	–0.1
Jayson Granger	8	2	12:03	.315	.457	1.000	1.3	2.4	0.5	0.0	3.4	3.5
Pierriá Henry	25	19	25:33	.539	.417	.745	3.4	3.9	1.6	0.0	10.6	12.8
Matt Janning	30	18	21:59	.469	.386	.787	1.3	1.6	0.6	0.1	7.8	5.4
Artūrs Kurucs	1	0	15:15	1.000	.500	1.000	0.0	2.0	0.0	1.0	6.0	8.0
Achille Polonara	30	1	12:55	.631	.392	.748	2.9	0.5	0.5	0.3	5.3	6.6
Tadas Sedekerskis	1	0	30:45	.250	.500	.000	5.0	3.0	0.0	1.0	5.0	8.0
Tornike Shengelia	29	29	32:09	.543	.296	.718	6.1	2.8	1.2	0.3	15.9	18.3
Shavon Shields	28	22	27:06	.550	.361	.807	4.0	1.1	1.1	0.2	11.5	12.3
Nik Stauskas	18	7	17:36	.474	.315	.847	1.5	1.4	0.4	0.2	7.2	5.0
Luca Vildoza	19	9	23:16	.448	.315	.868	2.8	2.7	1.3	0.3	8.0	7.5

Source: ACB

=== EuroLeague ===
Player	GP	GS	MPG	2FG%	3FG%	FT%	RPG	APG	SPG	BPG	PPG	PIR
Semaj Christon	7	5	25:14	.543	.286	.727	1.1	3.7	0.3	0.0	9.1	8.0
Ilimane Diop	27	0	10:37	.609	.286	.758	2.0	0.3	0.3	0.5	3.7	3.7
Zoran Dragić	5	1	17:23	.375	.357	.706	2.0	0.4	0.6	0.0	7.8	6.0
Micheal Eric	28	22	14:58	.552	.000	.457	2.7	0.3	0.8	0.6	5.7	4.4
Youssoupha Fall	28	6	13:33	.615	.000	.452	4.8	0.1	0.2	0.6	5.8	7.3
Sergi García	15	1	7:01	.286	.273	.000	0.7	0.5	0.2	0.0	0.9	0.3
Patricio Garino	10	4	18:58	.320	.320	.931	3.5	0.6	0.5	0.1	6.7	5.9
Miguel González	6	2	5:03	1.000	.333	.000	0.5	0.2	0.0	0.0	0.8	1.5
Pierriá Henry	25	18	24:39	.481	.295	.729	3.6	3.4	1.6	0.0	7.9	10.4
Matt Janning	28	13	22:41	.338	.285	.909	2.0	1.5	0.8	0.0	6.0	3.9
Lautaro López	1	0	3:10	.000	.000	.000	0.0	2.0	0.0	0.0	0.0	–1.0
Achille Polonara	27	0	12:31	.408	.225	.643	2.8	0.2	0.6	0.4	3.1	4.2
Tornike Shengelia	28	28	30:24	.586	.391	.769	5.6	2.9	1.0	0.5	15.9	18.5
Shavon Shields	26	21	25:21	.512	.346	.857	3.4	1.0	0.4	0.2	9.5	8.5
Nik Stauskas	22	12	20:31	.408	.422	.781	2.1	1.6	0.5	0.2	9.0	6.8
Luca Vildoza	16	7	23:08	.490	.288	1.000	1.9	3.2	1.1	0.4	7.1	6.9

Source: EuroLeague
