= 2019–20 Fenerbahçe S.K. (basketball) season =

Turkish professional basketball team season

Fenerbahçe
2019–20 season
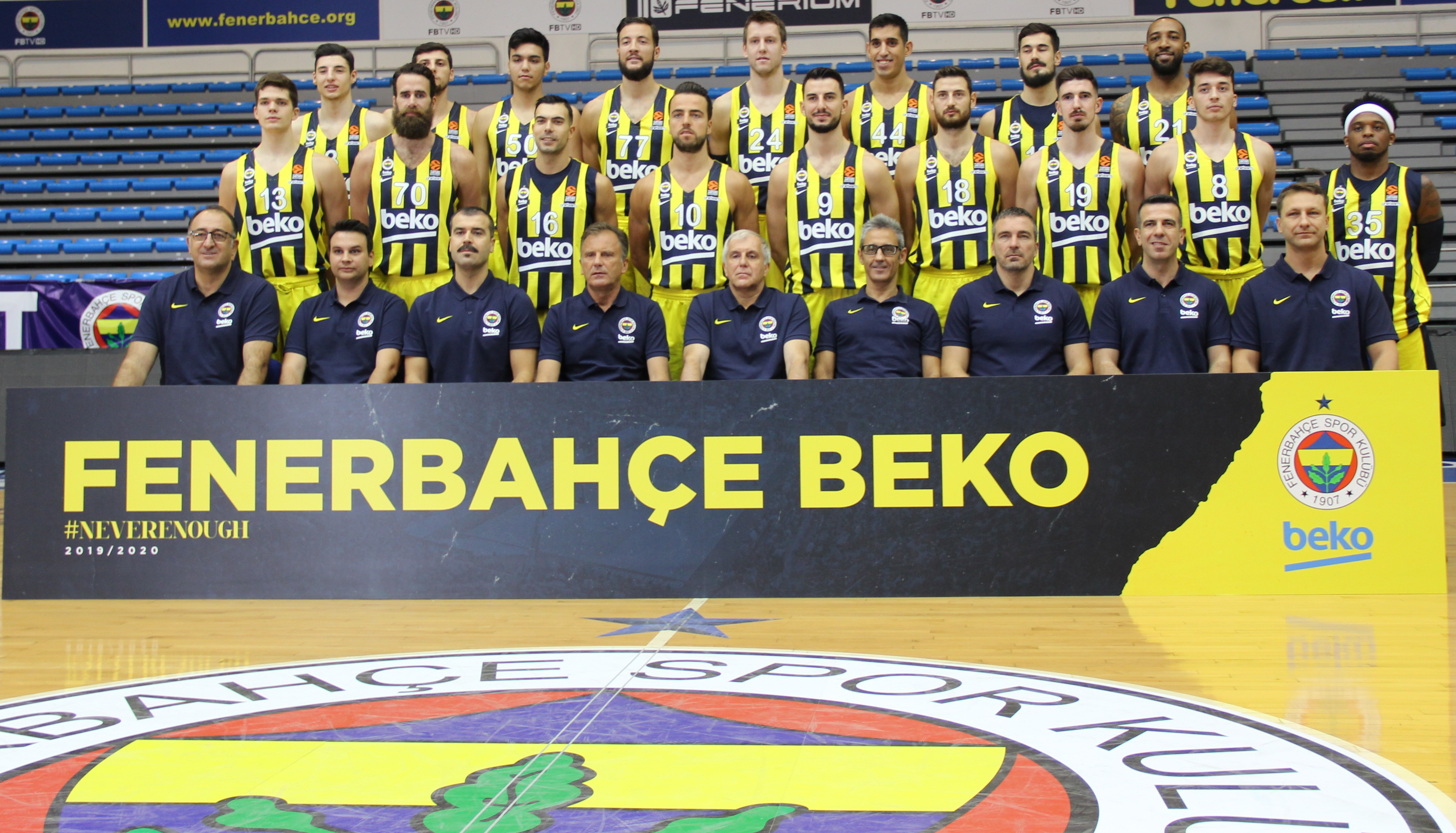
- President: Ali Koç
- Head coach: Željko Obradović
- Arena: Ülker Sports and Event Hall
- Basketball Super League: 4th seed (cancelled)
- EuroLeague: 8th seed (cancelled)
- Turkish Basketball Cup: Champion
- Turkish Basketball Presidential Cup: Runners-up
- PIR leader: (France) de Colo 17.2
- Scoring leader: (France) de Colo 17.3
- Rebounding leader: (France) Lauvergne 6.7
- Assists leader: (Greece) Sloukas 6.9
Home	Away

The 2019–20 season was Fenerbahçe's 106th season in the existence of the club. The team played in the Basketball Super League and in the Euroleague. In May 2020, the 2019–20 season was canceled due to the COVID-19 pandemic in the Basketball Super League and the EuroLeague.

== Players ==
=== Squad information ===
Note: Flags indicate national team eligibility at FIBA-sanctioned events. Players may hold other non-FIBA nationalities not displayed.

Fenerbahçe roster
Players
Coaches

Pos.	No.	Nat.	Name	Ht.	Wt.	Age
G/F	2	(United States)	Nunnally, James	2.01 m (6 ft 7 in)	95 kg (209 lb)	29 – 14 July 1990
SF	3	(Turkey)	Tırpancı, Ergi	2.03 m (6 ft 8 in)	93 kg (205 lb)	20 – 1 January 2000
SG	8	(Turkey)	Sancaklı, Ekrem	2 m (6 ft 7 in)	87 kg (192 lb)	18 – 26 April 2001
G	9	(France)	Westermann, Léo	1.98 m (6 ft 6 in)	90 kg (198 lb)	27 – 24 July 1992
G	10	(Turkey)	Mahmutoğlu, Melih (C)	1.91 m (6 ft 3 in)	85 kg (187 lb)	29 – 12 May 1990
F	12	(Serbia)	Kalinić, Nikola	2.03 m (6 ft 8 in)	101 kg (223 lb)	28 – 8 November 1991
F	13	(Turkey)	Biberovic, Tarık	2.01 m (6 ft 7 in)	100 kg (220 lb)	19 – 28 January 2001
G	16	(Greece)	Sloukas, Kostas	1.90 m (6 ft 3 in)	95 kg (209 lb)	30 – 15 January 1990
SF	18	(Turkey)	Arna, Egehan	2.03 m (6 ft 8 in)	93 kg (205 lb)	23 – 5 January 1997
SG	19	(France)	de Colo, Nando	1.96 m (6 ft 5 in)	91 kg (201 lb)	32 – 23 June 1987
PF	21	(United States)	Williams, Derrick	2.03 m (6 ft 8 in)	109 kg (240 lb)	28 – 25 May 1991
F	23	(United States)	Thomas, Malcolm	2.06 m (6 ft 9 in)	102 kg (225 lb)	31 – 8 November 1988
F/C	24	(Czech Republic)	Veselý, Jan	2.13 m (7 ft 0 in)	110 kg (243 lb)	29 – 24 April 1990
F	32	(Turkey)	Candan, Berkay	2.06 m (6 ft 9 in)	101 kg (223 lb)	26 – 22 May 1993
PG	35	(Turkey)	Muhammed, Ali (DC)	1.78 m (5 ft 10 in)	73 kg (161 lb)	36 – 10 April 1983
C	44	(Jordan)	Düverioğlu, Ahmet (DC)	2.13 m (7 ft 0 in)	121 kg (267 lb)	27 – 4 March 1993
SF	70	(Italy)	Datome, Luigi	2.03 m (6 ft 8 in)	98 kg (216 lb)	32 – 27 November 1987
C	77	(France)	Lauvergne, Joffrey	2.13 m (7 ft 0 in)	118 kg (260 lb)	28 – 30 September 1991

Head coach

- (Serbia) Željko Obradović

Assistant coach(es)

- (Serbia) Vladimir Androić
- (Turkey) Erdem Can
- (Spain) Josep Maria Izquierdo
- (Turkey) Berkay Oğuz

Athletic trainer(s)

- (Turkey) İlker Belgutay
- (Serbia) Predrag Zimonjić

Physiotherapist(s)

- (Turkey) Rıza Özdemir

Team manager

- (Italy) Maurizio Gherardini
- (Turkey) Cenk Renda

Legend

- (C) Team captain
- Injured

- Roster
Updated: December 25, 2019

=== Depth chart ===
Pos.	Starting 5	Bench 1	Bench 2	Bench 3	Inactive
C	Jan Veselý	Joffrey Lauvergne		Ahmet Düverioğlu
PF	Derrick Williams	Malcolm Thomas		Berkay Candan
SF	Luigi Datome	Nikola Kalinić		Egehan Arna
SG	Nando de Colo	James Nunnally	Melih Mahmutoğlu
PG	Kostas Sloukas	Léo Westermann	Ali Muhammed		Ekrem Sancaklı

=== Transactions ===
==== In ====
No.	Pos.	Nat.	Name	Age	Moving from		Ends	Date	Source
19	SG	(France)	Nando de Colo	32	CSKA Moscow	(Russia)	June 2021	6 July 2019	
9	PG	(France)	Léo Westermann	26	Žalgiris	(Lithuania)	June 2021	12 July 2019	
9	PG	(Turkey)	Berkay Candan	26	Büyükçekmece Basketbol	(Turkey)	June 2021	16 July 2019	
21	PF	(United States)	Derrick Williams	28	Bayern Munich	(Germany)	June 2020	18 July 2019	
91	PF	(Serbia)	Vladimir Štimac	32	Türk Telekom	(Turkey)	December 2019	25 September 2019	
23	PF	(United States)	Malcolm Thomas	31	Shanxi Loongs	(China)	June 2020	23 December 2019	
2	SF	(United States)	James Nunnally	29	Shanghai Sharks	(China)	June 2020	3 January 2020	

==== Out ====
No.	Pos.	Nat.	Name	Age	Moving to		Date	Source
23	SG	(Serbia)	Marko Gudurić	24	Memphis Grizzlies	(United States)	31 July 2019	
11	PG	(Canada)	Tyler Ennis	24	Raptors 905	(Canada)	7 July 2019	
1	PG	(United States)	Erick Green	28	Fujian Sturgeons	(China)	10 July 2019	
5	PF	(Turkey)	Barış Hersek	31	Free agent		10 July 2019	
22	SG	(Bulgaria)	Yordan Minchev	20	Levski Sofia	(Bulgaria)	10 July 2019	
9	C	(Turkey)	Ahmet Can Duran	20	Free agent		10 July 2019	
4	PF	(Italy)	Nicolò Melli	28	New Orleans Pelicans	(United States)	26 July 2019	
32	SG	(Turkey)	Sinan Güler	35	Darüşşafaka	(Turkey)	6 August 2019	
91	PF	(Serbia)	Vladimir Štimac	32	Crvena zvezda	(Serbia)	25 December 2019	

== Pre-season and friendlies ==
=== Friendly match ===
14 September 2019	U-BT Cluj-Napoca (Romania)	66–67	(Turkey) Fenerbahçe Beko
20:25	Scoring by quarter: 15–13, 19–25, 16–15, 16–14

15 September 2019	Fenerbahçe Beko (Turkey)	64–69	(Serbia) Partizan
20:00	Scoring by quarter: 20–17, 11–17, 20–19, 13–16

19 September 2019	Universo Treviso Basket (Italy)	58–71	(Turkey) Fenerbahçe Beko
21:30	Scoring by quarter: 16–20, 14–18, 11–16, 17-17

20 September 2019	Virtus Bologna (Italy)	94–68	(Turkey) Fenerbahçe Beko
21:30	Scoring by quarter: 31–7, 21–24, 20–24, 22–13

21 September 2019	Fenerbahçe Beko (Turkey)	75–79	(Italy) Olimpia Milano
16:45	Scoring by quarter: 21–14, 13–23, 22–17, 19–25

22 September 2019	Panathinaikos (Greece)	84–74	(Turkey) Fenerbahçe Beko
15:45	Scoring by quarter: 24–21, 24–12, 15–16, 21–25

== Competitions ==
=== Overview ===
Competition	First match	Last match	Starting round	Final position	Record							
Competition	First match	Last match	Starting round	Final position	Pld	W	D	L	PF	PA	PD	Win %
Basketball Super League	29 September 2019	15 March 2020	Round 1	Cancelled	22	17	0	5	1,785	1,612	+173	77.27
EuroLeague	3 October 2019	6 March 2020	Round 1	Cancelled	28	13	0	15	2,153	2,188	−35	46.43
Turkish Basketball Cup	12 February 2020	16 February 2020	Quarterfinals	Winner	3	3	0	0	257	222	+35	100.00
Turkish Basketball Presidential Cup	26 September 2019		Final	Runners-up	1	0	0	1	74	79	−5	0.00
Total					54	33	0	21	4,269	4,101	+168	61.11

Last updated: 15 March 2020
Source: Competitions

=== Basketball Super League ===
==== League table ====
Pos	Team	Pld	W	L	PF	PA	PD	Pts	Qualification (Note: There is no promotion/relegation, since the season was cancelled.)
2	Pınar Karşıyaka	23	20	3	1924	1587	+337	43	Qualification for Champions League
3	Galatasaray Doğa Sigorta	23	16	7	1868	1804	+64	39	Qualification for Champions League
4	Fenerbahçe Beko	22	17	5	1785	1612	+173	39	Qualification for EuroLeague (Note: Anadolu Efes and Fenerbahçe are qualified for the EuroLeague each year as they have long-term licenses.)
5	Tofaş	23	15	8	2003	1790	+213	38	Qualification for Champions League
6	Darüşşafaka Tekfen	23	13	10	1884	1763	+121	36	Qualification for Champions League

Source: Basketbol Süper Ligi

==== Results summary ====
Overall						Home					Away				
Pld	W	L	PF	PA	PD	W	L	PF	PA	PD	W	L	PF	PA	PD
22	17	5	1785	1612	+173	11	1	1015	889	+126	6	4	770	723	+47

Last updated: 15 March 2020.
Source: bsl.org.tr

==== Results by round ====
Round	1	2	3	4	5	6	7	8	9	10	11	12	13	14	15	16	17	18	19	20	21	22	23	24	25	26	27	28	29	30
Ground	A	H	A	H	A	H	H	A	H	A	H	A	H	A	H	H	A	H	A	H	A	A	H	A	H	A	H	A	H	D
Result	W	W	W	W	L	W	W	W	W	L	W	L	W	W	W	W	L	W	W	L	W	W	W	C	C	C	C	C	C	C
Position	1	2	2	2	4	4	4	3	3	4	3	4	3	3	3	3	3	3	3	3	5	5	4	4	4	4	4	4	4	4

Updated to match(es) played on 15 March 2020. Source: TBF.org.tr
A = Away; H = Home; W = Win; L = Loss; C = Cancelled

==== Matches ====
29 September 2019 1	Sigortam.net İTÜ	57–90	Fenerbahçe Beko	Istanbul
20:00	Scoring by quarter: 15–19, 10–22, 16–19, 16–30
	Pts: Akçay 18; Rebs: Williams 9 Asts: Akçay, Akyol 4 PIR: Akçay 68	Report	Pts: de Colo 21; Rebs: Düverioğlu 9 Asts: de Colo, Westermann 6 PIR: de Colo 20	Arena: Ayhan Şahenk Sports Hall; Attendance: 700; Referees: Mehmet Karabilecen, Semih Vural, Orhan Çağrı Hekimoğlu

6 October 2019 2	Fenerbahçe Beko	84–75	Gaziantep Basketbol	Istanbul
20:00	Scoring by quarter: 23–17, 16–24, 21–20, 24–14
	Pts: de Colo 21; Rebs: Williams, Düverioğlu 7 Asts: Sloukas 8 PIR: de Colo, Sloukas 19	Report	Pts: Hagins 20; Rebs: Sanders 5 Asts: Ulusoy 6 PIR: Sanders 18	Arena: Ülker Sports and Event Hall; Referees: Alper Altuğ Köselerli, Can Mavisu, Musa Kazım Çetin

12 October 2019 3	Türk Telekom	59–75	Fenerbahçe Beko	Ankara
20:00	Scoring by quarter: 14–21, 15–18, 16–17, 14–19
	Pts: Campbell 16; Rebs: Fall 6 Asts: Johnson, Hunter 3 PIR: Campbell 15	Report	Pts: Sloukas 18; Rebs: Štimac 9 Asts: Sloukas 7 PIR: Sloukas 25	Arena: Ankara Arena; Attendance: 6,500; Referees: Mehmet Şahin, Kaan Büyükçil, Ahmet Tatlıcı

20 October 2019 4	Fenerbahçe Beko	74–60	Bahçeşehir Koleji	Istanbul
13:00	Scoring by quarter: 13–7, 20–19, 25–15, 16–19
	Pts: Lauvergne 13; Rebs: Düverioğlu 7 Asts: Sloukas 7 PIR: Sloukas 16	Report	Pts: Johnson 19; Rebs: Johnson 9 Asts: Golden, Armand 5 PIR: Johnson 21	Arena: Ülker Sports and Event Hall; Attendance: 4,000; Referees: Erşan Kartal, Osman Sinan İşgüder, Sinem Tetik

27 October 2019 5	Galatasaray Doğa Sigorta	83–64	Fenerbahçe Beko	Istanbul
15:15	Scoring by quarter: 17–21, 18–16, 23–18, 25–9
	Pts: Whittington 20; Rebs: Whittington, Arslan 9 Asts: Harrison 8 PIR: Whittington 25	Report	Pts: de Colo 16; Rebs: de Colo 7 Asts: Sloukas 6 PIR: de Colo 19	Arena: Sinan Erdem Dome; Referees: Emin Moğulkoç, Mehmet Serdar Ünal, Seher Ayşe Nur Yazıcıoğlu

3 November 2019 6	Fenerbahçe Beko	86–80	Afyon Belediyespor	Istanbul
13:00	Scoring by quarter: 20–18, 16–17, 27–24, 23–21
	Pts: Sloukas 20; Rebs: Lauvergne 10; Asts: Sloukas 6 PIR: Sloukas 27	Report	Pts: Zanna 24; Rebs: Zanna 8 Asts: Gülaslan 5 PIR: Zanna 24	Arena: Ülker Sports and Event Hall; Attendance: 1,000; Referees: Ali Serkan Emlek, Halil Baldemir, Hüseyin Çelik

10 November 2019 7	Fenerbahçe Beko	84–80	Beşiktaş Sompo Sigorta	Istanbul
15:15	Scoring by quarter: 20–17, 16–21, 16–20, 32–22
	Pts: Sloukas, Düverioğlu 17; Rebs: Lauvergne 6 Asts: Sloukas, Lauvergne 6 PIR: Düverioğlu 21	Report	Pts: McAdoo 24; Rebs: Đurišić 7 Asts: Theodore 10; PIR: Theodore 29	Arena: Ülker Sports and Event Hall; Attendance: 4,000; Referees: Yener Yılmaz, Alper Ertuğ Köselerli, Polat Parlak

17 November 2019 8	Tofaş	76–82	Fenerbahçe Beko	Bursa
15:15	Scoring by quarter: 13–25, 19–13, 14–30, 30–14
	Pts: Phillip 18; Rebs: Mejia 6 Asts: Ermiş 5 PIR: Phillip 20	Report	Pts: Mahmutoğlu 29; Rebs: Düverioğlu 9 Asts: Sloukas 8 PIR: Mahmutoğlu 26	Arena: Tofaş Nilüfer Spor Salonu; Referees: Mehmet Keseratar, Semih Vural, Serhat Büker

24 November 2019 9	Fenerbahçe Beko	83–75	Darüşşafaka	Istanbul
20:00	Scoring by quarter: 20–17, 21–20, 21–17, 21-21
	Pts: Nikola Kalinić 14; Rebs: Lauvergne 9 Asts: Nikola Kalinić 6 PIR: Nikola Kalinić, Lauvergne 17	Report	Pts: Colson 23; Rebs: Ağya 7 Asts: Güler 6 PIR: Colson 33	Arena: Ülker Sports and Event Hall; Attendance: 3,500; Referees: Kerem Baki, Ozan Çakar, Alper Özgök

1 December 2019 10	Pınar Karşıyaka	68–57	Fenerbahçe Beko	İzmir
17:30	Scoring by quarter: 17–15, 18–10, 18–20
	Pts: Morgan 19; Rebs: Birsen 10; Asts: M'Baye 4 PIR: Morgan 24	Report	Pts: Mahmutoğlu 16; Rebs: Sloukas 7 Asts: Sloukas 5 PIR: Sloukas 15	Arena: Mustafa Kemal Atatürk Karşıyaka Sports Hall; Attendance: 5,000; Referees: Emin Moğulkoç, Can Mavisu, Ahmet Tatlıcı

8 December 2019 11	Fenerbahçe Beko	85–52	OGM Ormanspor	Istanbul
13:00	Scoring by quarter: 24–11, 17–8, 23–11, 21–22
	Pts: Arna 16; Rebs: Lauvergne 10; Asts: Westermann 6 PIR: Westermann 15	Report	Pts: Kikanović 16; Rebs: Kikanović 5 Asts: Babić 3 PIR: Kikanović 11	Arena: Ülker Sports and Event Hall; Attendance: 5,000; Referees: Mehmet Karabilecen, Duhan Köyiçi, Ali Köseoğlu

14 December 2019 12	Anadolu Efes	79–66	Fenerbahçe Beko	Istanbul
17:30	Scoring by quarter: 17–14, 18–20, 26–10, 18–22
	Pts: Simon 16; Rebs: Pleiß 7 Asts: Larkin 6 PIR: Simon 21	Report	Pts: de Colo 17; Rebs: de Colo 5 Asts: Sloukas 7 PIR: de Colo 18	Arena: Sinan Erdem Dome; Attendance: 7,267; Referees: Ali Serkan Emlek, Yener Yılmaz, Özlem Yalman

22 December 2019 13	Fenerbahçe Beko	89–79	Teksüt Bandırma	Istanbul
13:00	Scoring by quarter: 21–16, 23–18, 22–26, 23–19
	Pts: Datome 18; Rebs: Lauvergne 11; Asts: Sloukas 9 PIR: Lauvergne, de Colo 20	Report	Pts: Terry 21; Rebs: Terry 10; Asts: Smith 6 PIR: Terry 30	Arena: Ülker Sports and Event Hall; Attendance: 5,000; Referees: Aytuğ Ekti, Ziya Özorhon, Orhan Çağrı Hekimoğlu

30 December 2019 14	Arel Üniversitesi Büyükçekmece	68–92	Fenerbahçe Beko	Istanbul
20:00	Scoring by quarter: 21–12, 19–20, 15–29, 13–31
	Pts: Andrews 19; Rebs: Upshaw 17; Asts: Eldridge 7 PIR: Upshaw 21	Report	Pts: Mahmutoğlu 23; Rebs: üç oyuncu 6 Asts: Sloukas 14; PIR: Sloukas 30	Arena: Gazanfer Bilge Sports Hall; Attendance: 1,849; Referees: Erşan Kartal, Osman Sinan İşgüder, Özge Şentürk

5 January 2020 15	Fenerbahçe Beko	86–83	Frutti Extra Bursaspor	Istanbul
13:00	Scoring by quarter: 17–23, 22–16, 28–25, 19-19
	Pts: de Colo 29; Rebs: Kalinić, Thomas 4 Asts: Westermann 5 PIR: de Colo 23	Report	Pts: Jones 25; Rebs: Riley 8 Asts: Jones 10; PIR: Jones 27	Arena: Ülker Sports and Event Hall; Attendance: 6,000; Referees: Kaan Büyükçil, Alper Özgök, Musa Kazım Çetin

11 January 2020 16	Fenerbahçe Beko	94–83	Sigortam.net İTÜ	Istanbul
20:00	Scoring by quarter: 35–19, 17–20, 20–19, 22–25
	Pts: Mahmutoğlu 23; Rebs: Lauvergne 9 Asts: Veselý 7 PIR: Lauvergne 21	Report	Pts: Mobley 25; Rebs: Coleby 6 Asts: Yağmur 7 PIR: Mobley, Goodwin 20	Arena: Ülker Sports and Event Hall; Attendance: 3,000; Referees: Kerem Baki, Mehmet Serdar Ünal, Serhat Büker

26 January 2020 17	Gaziantep Basketbol	81–70	Fenerbahçe Beko	Gaziantep
15:15	Scoring by quarter: 19–17, 18–21, 23–14, 21–18
	Pts: Jelovac 17; Rebs: Jelovac 10; Asts: Ulusoy 7 PIR: Jelovac 27	Report	Pts: Dixon 16; Rebs: Lauvergne 9 Asts: Dixon, Westermann 5 PIR: Dixon 21	Arena: Karataş Şahinbey Sport Hall; Attendance: 6,050; Referees: Emin Moğulkoç, Mehmet Şahin, Ahmet Tatlıcı

2 February 2020 18	Fenerbahçe Beko	91–67	Türk Telekom	Istanbul
15:15	Scoring by quarter: 21–14, 33–16, 22–24, 15–13
	Pts: Williams 31; Rebs: Williams, Thomas 5 Asts: Kalinić 9 PIR: Williams 29	Report	Pts: Wiltjer 15; Rebs: Wiltjer 6 Asts: Harris 6 PIR: Harris 16	Arena: Ülker Sports and Event Hall; Attendance: 2,225; Referees: Mehmet Karabilecen, Alper Altuğ Köselerli, Seher Ayşe Nur Yazıcıoğlu

9 February 2020 19	Bahçeşehir Koleji	79–100	Fenerbahçe Beko	Istanbul
17:30	Scoring by quarter: 19–24, 18–24, 23–24, 19–28
	Pts: Golden 28; Rebs: Jones 8 Asts: Golden 14; PIR: Golden 33	Report	Pts: Mahmutoğlu, de Colo 26; Rebs: Westermann 8 Asts: Westermann 8 PIR: de Colo 28	Arena: Akatlar Arena; Referees: Aytuğ Ekti, Can Mavisu, Polat Parlak

26 February 2020 20	Fenerbahçe Beko	75–80	Galatasaray Doğa Sigorta	Istanbul
20:15	Scoring by quarter: 22–19, 17–19, 14–19 9, 22–23
	Pts: de Colo 15; Rebs: Veselý 9 Asts: de Colo 8 PIR: de Colo 20	Report	Pts: Auguste 17; Rebs: Auguste 15; Asts: Webster 5 PIR: Auguste 27	Arena: Ülker Sports and Event Hall; Attendance: 8,000; Referees: Mehmet Keseratar, Ziya Özorhon, Hüseyin Çelik

1 March 2020 21	Afyon Belediyespor	62–64	Fenerbahçe Beko	Afyonkarahisar
17:30	Scoring by quarter: 17–20, 15–12, 19–12, 11–20
	Pts: Aldridge 17; Rebs: Zanna 9 Asts: Hrovat 8 PIR: Aldridge 18	Report	Pts: Williams 15; Rebs: three players 6 Asts: Westermann 6 PIR: Thomas 12	Arena: Prof. Dr. Veysel Eroğlu Spor Salonu; Attendance: 2,510; Referees: Zafer Yılmaz, Kaan Büyükçil, Serhat Büker
Note: Turkish Basketball Federation announced that the match, which actually Fenerbahçe won, would be re-played, due to a referee error in the third quarter.

8 March 2020 22	Beşiktaş Sompo Sigorta	73–74	Fenerbahçe Beko	Istanbul
15:15	Scoring by quarter: 10–25, 19–21, 18–15, 26–13
	Pts: Đurišić, Yıldızlı 16; Rebs: Gotcher, Savaş 8 Asts: Gotcher 7 PIR: Gotcher 23	Report	Pts: de Colo 20; Rebs: Düverioğlu 8 Asts: Westerkann 7 PIR: de Colo 18	Arena: Akatlar Arena; Attendance: 1,631; Referees: Ali Serkan Emlek, Ali Şakacı, Duhan Köyiçi

15 March 2020 23	Fenerbahçe Beko	84–75	Tofaş	Istanbul
13:00	Scoring by quarter: 19–20, 25–17, 22–17, 18–21
	Pts: de Colo 19; Rebs: Düverioğlu 6 Asts: de Colo 9 PIR: de Colo 33	Report	Pts: Ermiş 14; Rebs: Brown 7 Asts: White, Brown 4 PIR: Ermiş 22	Arena: Ülker Sports and Event Hall; Attendance: 0 (Note: It was concluded that matches would be played behind closed doors in the arenas in Basketball Super League until the end of April due to the coronavirus pandemic.); Referees: Mehmet Karabilecen, Mehmet Şahin, Alper Özgök

22 March 2020 24	Darüşşafaka	Cancelled	Fenerbahçe Beko	Istanbul
20:00
		Report		Arena: Ayhan Şahenk Sports Hall
Note: Postponed due to the coronavirus pandemic. Cancelled on 11 May.

29 March 2020 25	Fenerbahçe Beko	Cancelled	Pınar Karşıyaka	Istanbul
13:00
		Report		Arena: Ülker Sports and Event Hall
Note: Postponed due to the coronavirus pandemic. Cancelled on 11 May.

4 April 2020 26	OGM Ormanspor	Cancelled	Fenerbahçe Beko	Ankara
15:15
		Report		Arena: Ankara Arena
Note: Postponed due to the coronavirus pandemic. Cancelled on 11 May.

13 April 2020 27	Fenerbahçe Beko	Cancelled	Anadolu Efes	Istanbul
20:00
		Report		Arena: Ülker Sports and Event Hall
Note: Postponed due to the coronavirus pandemic. Cancelled on 11 May.

18 April 2020 28	Teksüt Bandırma	Cancelled	Fenerbahçe Beko	Balıkesir
17:30
		Report		Arena: Kara Ali Acar Sport Hall
Note: Postponed due to the coronavirus pandemic. Cancelled on 11 May.

26 April 2020 29	Fenerbahçe Beko	Cancelled	Arel Üniversitesi Büyükçekmece	Istanbul
13:00
		Report		Arena: Ülker Sports and Event Hall
Note: Postponed due to the coronavirus pandemic. Cancelled on 11 May.

3 May 2020 30	Frutti Extra Bursaspor	Cancelled	Fenerbahçe Beko	Bursa
15:15
		Report		Arena: Tofaş Nilüfer Spor Salonu
Note: Postponed due to the coronavirus pandemic. Cancelled on 11 May.

=== EuroLeague ===
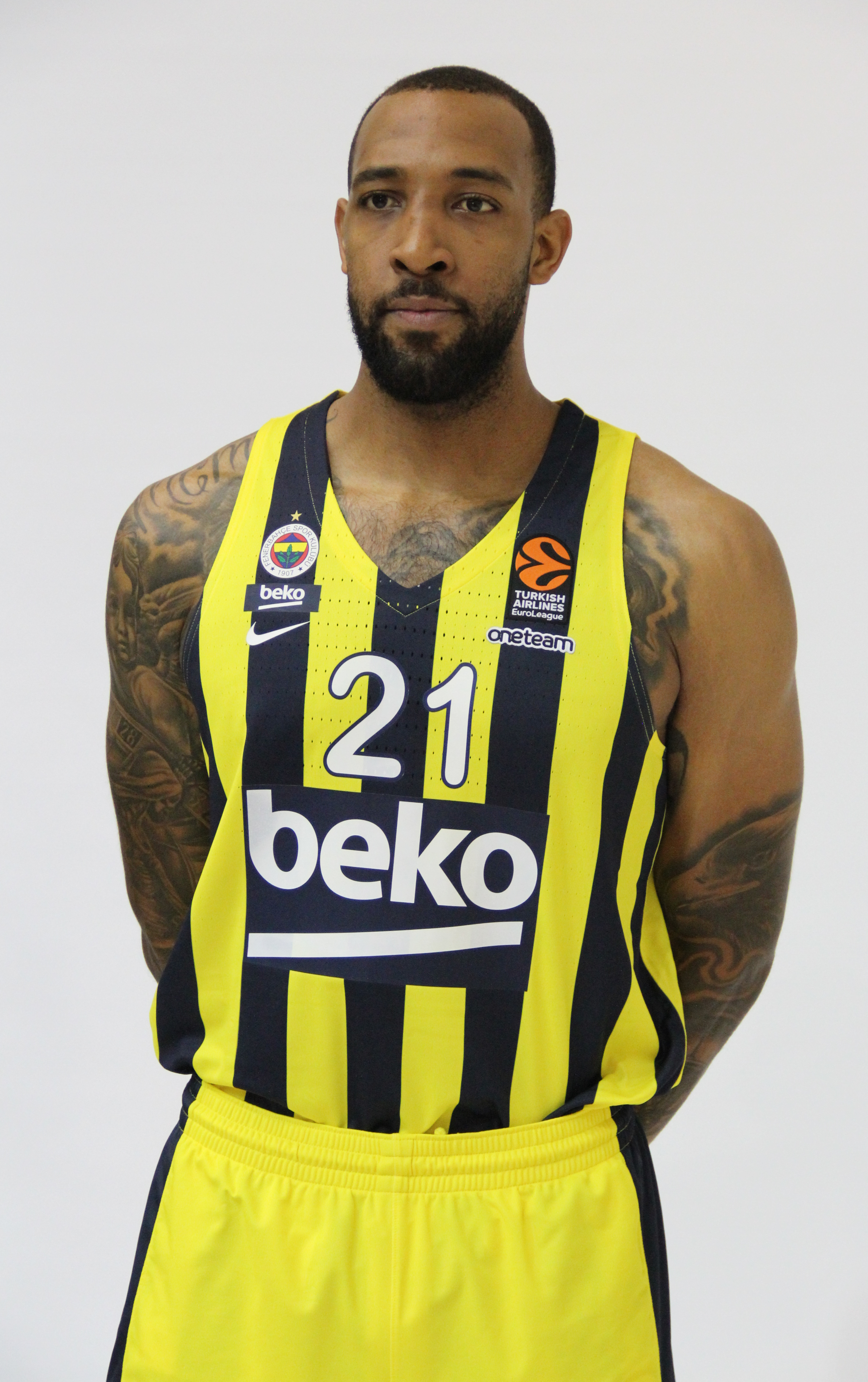
Derrick Williams

==== League table ====
Pos	Team	Pld	W	L	PF	PA	PD
6	(Greece) Panathinaikos OPAP	28	14	14	2392	2394	−2
7	(Russia) Khimki	28	13	15	2393	2380	+13
8	(Turkey) Fenerbahçe Beko	28	13	15	2153	2188	−35
9	(Lithuania) Žalgiris	28	12	16	2213	2142	+71
10	(Spain) Valencia Basket	28	12	16	2252	2273	−21

Source: EuroLeague
Rules for classification: All points scored in extra period(s) were not counted in the standings, nor for any tie-break situation.

==== Results summary ====
Overall						Home					Away				
Pld	W	L	PF	PA	PD	W	L	PF	PA	PD	W	L	PF	PA	PD
28	13	15	2153	2188	−35	7	7	1109	1097	+12	6	8	1044	1091	−47

Last updated: 6 March 2020.
Source: EuroLeague

==== Results by round ====
Round	1	2	3	4	5	6	7	8	9	10	11	12	13	14	15	16	17	18	19	20	21	22	23	24	25	26	27	28	29	30	31	32	33	34
Ground	A	A	H	A	A	H	H	A	A	A	H	H	H	A	H	H	A	A	H	H	H	A	A	H	H	A	H	A	H	A	A	H	H	E
Result	L	L	W	L	L	L	W	L	L	W	W	W	L	L	L	L	W	W	W	L	W	W	W	L	L	W	W	L	C	C	C	C	C	C
Position	10	15	16	16	17	17	14	15	17	16	13	12	13	15	15	15	14	12	10	11	9	9	7	9	10	9	7	8	8⁣	8⁣	8⁣	8⁣	8⁣	8⁣

Source: EuroLeague.net
A = Away; H = Home; W = Win; L = Loss; C = Cancelled

==== Matches ====
3 October 2019 1	Real Madrid (Spain)	81–77	(Turkey) Fenerbahçe Beko	Madrid
21:00	Scoring by quarter: 30–21, 13–21, 21–13, 17–22
	Pts: Taylor 19; Rebs: Randolph, Tavares 5 Asts: Campazzo 8 PIR: Campazzo 24	Boxscore	Pts: de Colo 22; Rebs: Williams 10; Asts: Sloukas 5 PIR: de Colo, Williams 20	Arena: WiZink Center; Attendance: 10,434; Referees: Robert Lottermoser, Oļegs Latiševs, Mehdi Difallah

10 October 2019 2	Crvena zvezda mts (Serbia)	68–56	(Turkey) Fenerbahçe Beko	Belgrade
19:00	Scoring by quarter: 15–16, 20–14, 16–13, 17–13
	Pts: L. Brown 13; Rebs: D. Brown, Gist 8 Asts: L. Brown 6 PIR: L. Brown 17	Boxscore	Pts: de Colo 19; Rebs: Williams 7 Asts: de Colo 4 PIR: de Colo 19	Arena: Štark Arena; Attendance: 16,879 (tentative); Referees: Luigi Lamonica, Piotr Pastusiak, Rain Peerandi

17 October 2019 3	Fenerbahçe Beko (Turkey)	87–80	(Spain) Kirolbet Baskonia	Istanbul
19:45	Scoring by quarter: 22–22, 17–14, 24–22, 24–22
	Pts: de Colo 39; Rebs: Veselý 7 Asts: Sloukas, Veselý 5 PIR: de Colo 44	Boxscore	Pts: Shengelia 18; Rebs: Polonara, Shengelia 4 Asts: Vildoza 4 PIR: Shengelia 23	Arena: Ülker Sports and Event Hall; Attendance: 10,104; Referees: Matej Boltauzer, Carmelo Paternicò, Gytis Vilius

25 October 2019 4	A|X Armani Exchange Milan (Italy)	87–74	(Turkey) Fenerbahçe Beko	Assago
20:45	Scoring by quarter: 20–11, 21–18, 25–26, 21–19
	Pts: Rodríguez 22; Rebs: Tarczewski 9 Asts: Micov 7 PIR: Gudaitis 25	Boxscore	Pts: Lauvergne, Veselý 14; Rebs: Lauvergne 8 Asts: Sloukas 7 PIR: Veselý 21	Arena: Mediolanum Forum; Attendance: 9,486; Referees: Christos Christodoulou, Saša Pukl, Uroš Nikolić

30 October 2019 5	Maccabi Tel Aviv (Israel)	67–55	(Turkey) Fenerbahçe Beko	Tel Aviv
20:05	Scoring by quarter: 12–6, 29–15, 11–20, 15–14
	Pts: Casspi 13; Rebs: Black 15; Asts: Casspi 4 PIR: Black 21	Boxscore	Pts: de Colo 18; Rebs: Datome 8 Asts: Dixon 4 PIR: Dixon 18	Arena: Menora Mivtachim Arena; Attendance: 10,682; Referees: Daniel Hierrezuelo, Anne Panther, Sérgio Silva

1 November 2019 6	Fenerbahçe Beko (Turkey)	76–79	(Lithuania) Žalgiris	Istanbul
18:45	Scoring by quarter: 17–17, 23–16, 19–19, 17–27
	Pts: de Colo 29; Rebs: Veselý 6 Asts: Sloukas 9 PIR: de Colo 28	Boxscore	Pts: Grigonis 19; Rebs: Jankūnas 6 Asts: Walkup 5 PIR: Grigonis 23	Arena: Ülker Sports and Event Hall; Attendance: 10,378; Referees: Robert Lottermoser, Juan Carlos García González, Milivoje Jovčić

8 November 2019 7	Fenerbahçe Beko (Turkey)	90–82	(Germany) Bayern Munich	Istanbul
18:45	Scoring by quarter: 18–15, 22–24, 21–23, 29–20
	Pts: Williams 19; Rebs: Veselý 4 Asts: Kalinić 5 PIR: de Colo 24	Boxscore	Pts: Monroe 19; Rebs: Lučić, Monroe 7 Asts: Lô 6 PIR: Monroe 26	Arena: Ülker Sports and Event Hall; Attendance: 8,871; Referees: Sreten Radović, Ioannis Foufis, Carlos Peruga

15 November 2019 8	CSKA Moscow (Russia)	88–70	(Turkey) Fenerbahçe Beko	Moscow
18:00	Scoring by quarter: 21–17, 18–17, 25–15, 24–21
	Pts: James 31; Rebs: Vorontsevich 10; Asts: Hackett, James 4 PIR: James 38	Boxscore	Pts: Sloukas 20; Rebs: Kalinić 10; Asts: Sloukas 6 PIR: Sloukas 22	Arena: Universal Sports Hall CSKA; Attendance: 5,112; Referees: Miguel Ángel Pérez Pérez, Fernando Rocha, Mehdi Difallah

20 November 2019 9	Barcelona (Spain)	89–63	(Turkey) Fenerbahçe Beko	Barcelona
21:00	Scoring by quarter: 25–15, 19–15, 23–10, 22–23
	Pts: Higgins 22; Rebs: Mirotić 10; Asts: Delaney 9 PIR: Higgins 22	Boxscore	Pts: Lauvergne 12; Rebs: Štimac 6 Asts: Sloukas 5 PIR: Lauvergne, Sloukas 11	Arena: Palau Blaugrana; Attendance: 6,287; Referees: Christos Christodoulou, Matej Boltauzer, Oļegs Latiševs

22 November 2019 10	LDLC ASVEL (France)	72–88	(Turkey) Fenerbahçe Beko	Villeurbanne
20:45	Scoring by quarter: 16–19, 20–29, 16–19, 20–21
	Pts: Lighty 18; Rebs: Kahudi, Lighty 4 Asts: Maledon 5 PIR: Jean-Charles 16	Boxscore	Pts: Štimac 21; Rebs: Štimac 8 Asts: Sloukas 8 PIR: Štimac 27	Arena: Astroballe; Attendance: 5,542; Referees: Damir Javor, Spiros Gkontas, Jordi Aliaga

28 November 2019 11	Fenerbahçe Beko (Turkey)	89–76	(Russia) Khimki	Istanbul
18:45	Scoring by quarter: 28–24, 16–25, 21–6, 24–21
	Pts: Datome 20; Rebs: Williams 8 Asts: Sloukas 9 PIR: Sloukas 23	Boxscore	Pts: Timma 26; Rebs: Gill 9 Asts: Jović 6 PIR: Gill 26	Arena: Ülker Sports and Event Hall; Attendance: 9,158; Referees: Ilija Belošević, Carmelo Paternicò, Carlos Cortés

6 December 2019 12	Fenerbahçe Beko (Turkey)	107–102(OT)	(Germany) ALBA Berlin	Istanbul
18:45	Scoring by quarter: 30–16, 11–24, 24–22, 23–26, Overtime: 19–14
	Pts: Sloukas 23; Rebs: Datome 7 Asts: Sloukas 10; PIR: Sloukas 39	Boxscore	Pts: Giedraitis 19; Rebs: Sikma 8 Asts: Siva 6 PIR: Sikma 26	Arena: Ülker Sports and Event Hall; Attendance: 8,282; Referees: Milivoje Jovčić, Sašo Petek, Amit Balak

12 December 2019 13	Fenerbahçe Beko (Turkey)	73–81	(Turkey) Anadolu Efes	Istanbul
18:45	Scoring by quarter: 22–20, 16–18, 11–21, 24–22
	Pts: Williams 16; Rebs: Datome 8 Asts: Sloukas 7 PIR: Datome, Sloukas 15	Boxscore	Pts: Simon 22; Rebs: Simon 9 Asts: Micić 5 PIR: Simon 31	Arena: Ülker Sports and Event Hall; Attendance: 12,278; Referees: Daniel Hierrezuelo, Saša Pukl, Mehdi Difallah

17 December 2019 14	Panathinaikos OPAP (Greece)	81–78	(Turkey) Fenerbahçe Beko	Athens
20:00	Scoring by quarter: 22–21, 20–25, 23–11, 16–21
	Pts: Fredette 22; Rebs: Mitoglou 7 Asts: Calathes 8 PIR: Fredette 26	Boxscore	Pts: Sloukas 15; Rebs: Datome 6 Asts: Sloukas 8 PIR: Sloukas 24	Arena: O.A.K.A. Attendance: 0 Referees: Juan Carlos García González, Fernando Rocha, Tomislav Hordov

19 December 2019 15	Fenerbahçe Beko (Turkey)	81–84	(Russia) Zenit Saint Petersburg	Istanbul
18:45	Scoring by quarter: 22–18, 21–20, 16–22, 22–24
	Pts: Lauvergne 18; Rebs: Düverioğlu 7 Asts: de Colo, Sloukas 6 PIR: Kalinić 21	Boxscore	Pts: Ponitka 16; Rebs: Abromaitis 7 Asts: Ponitka 8 PIR: Ponitka 29	Arena: Ülker Sports and Event Hall; Attendance: 8,153; Referees: Sreten Radović, Jakub Zamojski, Mario Majkić

27 December 2019 16	Fenerbahçe Beko (Turkey)	98–100(OT)	(Spain) Valencia Basket	Istanbul
18:45	Scoring by quarter: 24–22, 24–18, 22–19, 14–25, Overtime: 14–16
	Pts: de Colo 31; Rebs: de Colo 7 Asts: Sloukas 9 PIR: de Colo 37	Boxscore	Pts: Dubljević 30; Rebs: Dubljević 12; Asts: Abalde, Van Rossom 5 PIR: Dubljević 42	Arena: Ülker Sports and Event Hall; Attendance: 8,211; Referees: Luigi Lamonica, Elias Koromilas, Saulius Racys

2 January 2020 17	Olympiacos (Greece)	87–96	(Turkey) Fenerbahçe Beko	Piraeus
20:00	Scoring by quarter: 20–22, 20–30, 21–22, 26–22
	Pts: Printezis, Spanoulis 14; Rebs: Milutinov 7 Asts: Spanoulis 8 PIR: Milutinov, Printezis 19	Boxscore	Pts: de Colo 32; Rebs: Williams 5 Asts: Sloukas 9 PIR: de Colo 31	Arena: Peace and Friendship Stadium; Attendance: 10,234; Referees: Miguel Ángel Pérez Pérez, Oļegs Latiševs, Robert Vyklický

9 January 2020 18	Kirolbet Baskonia (Spain)	65–79	(Turkey) Fenerbahçe Beko	Vitoria-Gasteiz
21:00	Scoring by quarter: 11–20, 17–22, 17–20, 20–17
	Pts: Shengelia 21; Rebs: Shengelia 7 Asts: Henry 5 PIR: Shengelia 37	Boxscore	Pts: Westermann 21; Rebs: Thomas 8 Asts: Williams 5 PIR: Williams 24	Arena: Buesa Arena; Attendance: 10,613; Referees: Matej Boltauzer, Carmelo Paternicò, Petri Mäntylä

14 January 2020 19	Fenerbahçe Beko (Turkey)	86–64	(France) LDLC ASVEL	Istanbul
18:45	Scoring by quarter: 23–15, 26–13, 13–15, 24–21
	Pts: de Colo, Williams 16; Rebs: Datome, Sloukas 6 Asts: Sloukas 10; PIR: Sloukas 24	Boxscore	Pts: Noua 12; Rebs: Noua 6 Asts: Maledon 4 PIR: Jean-Charles, Noua 12	Arena: Ülker Sports and Event Hall; Attendance: 7,808; Referees: Robert Lottermoser, Piotr Pastusiak, Michele Rossi

16 January 2020 20	Fenerbahçe Beko (Turkey)	74–80	(Spain) Barcelona	Istanbul
18:45	Scoring by quarter: 12–24, 27–18, 17–19, 18–19
	Pts: Sloukas 14; Rebs: Sloukas 7 Asts: Sloukas 11; PIR: Sloukas 26	Boxscore	Pts: Claver 17; Rebs: Mirotić 11; Asts: Davies 4 PIR: Mirotić 24	Arena: Ülker Sports and Event Hall; Attendance: 12,792 (tentative); Referees: Damir Javor, Joseph Bissang, Ioannis Foufis

24 January 2020 21	Fenerbahçe Beko (Turkey)	73–64	(Italy) A|X Armani Exchange Milan	Istanbul
18:45	Scoring by quarter: 24–15, 17–16, 15–16, 17–17
	Pts: Datome 14; Rebs: Datome 6 Asts: Sloukas 7 PIR: Veselý 18	Boxscore	Pts: Tarczewski 19; Rebs: Tarczewski 9 Asts: Rodríguez 6 PIR: Tarczewski 27	Arena: Ülker Sports and Event Hall; Attendance: 11,697; Referees: Christos Christodoulou, Carlos Peruga, Sašo Petek

30 January 2020 22	ALBA Berlin (Germany)	70–74	(Turkey) Fenerbahçe Beko	Berlin
20:00	Scoring by quarter: 22–17, 19–16, 15–17, 14–24
	Pts: Giedraitis 14; Rebs: Nnoko 6 Asts: Sikma 8 PIR: Giedraitis 18	Boxscore	Pts: Sloukas 16; Rebs: Veselý 6 Asts: Sloukas 5 PIR: Veselý 23	Arena: Mercedes-Benz Arena; Attendance: 12,122; Referees: Saša Pukl, Tomasz Trawicki, Aare Halliko

5 February 2020 23	Zenit Saint Petersburg (Russia)	68–73	(Turkey) Fenerbahçe Beko	Saint Petersburg
18:00	Scoring by quarter: 15–19, 17–22, 18–13, 18–19
	Pts: Hollins, Ayón 16; Rebs: three players 5 Asts: Albicy 5 PIR: Ayón 20	Boxscore	Pts: Westermann 13; Rebs: Thomas 5 Asts: Westermann, Sloukas 4 PIR: Veselý 19	Arena: Sibur Arena; Attendance: 4,196; Referees: Daniel Hierrezuelo, Milan Nedović, Uroš Nikolić

7 February 2020 24	Fenerbahçe Beko (Turkey)	77–78	(Israel) Maccabi Tel Aviv	Istanbul
18:45	Scoring by quarter: 23–20, 17–21, 23–23, 14–14
	Pts: Williams 22; Rebs: Veselý 8 Asts: Veselý, Sloukas 4 PIR: Williams 29	Boxscore	Pts: Hunter, Avdija 13; Rebs: three players 3 Asts: Bryant, Caloiaro 4 PIR: Caloiaro 17	Arena: Ülker Sports and Event Hall; Attendance: 10,527; Referees: Robert Lottermoser, Matej Boltauzer, Emilio Pérez Pizarro

20 February 2020 25	Fenerbahçe Beko (Turkey)	65–94	(Spain) Real Madrid	Istanbul
18:45	Scoring by quarter: 15–22, 16–25, 20–24, 14–23
	Pts: de Colo 21; Rebs: Kalinić 4 Asts: de Colo 6 PIR: de Colo 23	Boxscore	Pts: Carroll 20; Rebs: Tavares 8 Asts: Campazzo 8 PIR: Carroll, Tavares 19	Arena: Ülker Sports and Event Hall; Attendance: 12,705; Referees: Ilija Belošević, Borys Ryzhyk, Carmelo Paternicò

28 February 2020 26	Valencia Basket (Spain)	86–93	(Turkey) Fenerbahçe Beko	Valencia
21:00	Scoring by quarter: 14−21, 27−26, 19−18, 26−28
	Pts: Marinković 22; Rebs: Tobey 6 Asts: Colom 5 PIR: Marinković 23	Boxscore	Pts: Williams 22; Rebs: Thomas 5 Asts: de Colo 5 PIR: Williams 24	Arena: La Fonteta; Attendance: 7,378; Referees: Oļegs Latiševs, Piotr Pastusiak, Mario Majkić

4 March 2020 27	Fenerbahçe Beko (Turkey)	66–63	(Serbia) Crvena zvezda mts	Istanbul
18:45	Scoring by quarter: 22−20, 19−17, 10−14, 15−12
	Pts: Kalinić 10; Rebs: Williams, Thomas 6 Asts: Westermann 4 PIR: Williams 19	Boxscore	Pts: Punter, Brown 14; Rebs: Štimac 7 Asts: Brown 3 PIR: Brown 15	Arena: Ülker Sports and Event Hall; Attendance: 7,315; Referees: Juan Carlos García González, Spiros Gkontas, Gytis Vilius

6 March 2020 28	Khimki (Russia)	82–68	(Turkey) Fenerbahçe Beko	Mytishchi
18:00	Scoring by quarter: 26−18, 15−22, 23−14, 18−14
	Pts: Shved 23; Rebs: Jonas Jerebko 9 Asts: Jović 7 PIR: Jerebko 27	Boxscore	Pts: Dixon 13; Rebs: Veselý 5 Asts: Westermann, de Colo 3 PIR: Dixon 15	Arena: Mytishchi Arena; Attendance: 4,873; Referees: Daniel Hierrezuelo, Mehdi Difallah, Tomasz Trawicki

13 March 2020 29	Fenerbahçe Beko (Turkey)	Cancelled	(Greece) Panathinaikos OPAP	Istanbul
18:45
		Boxscore		Arena: Ülker Sports and Event Hall
Note: Postponed due to the coronavirus pandemic. Cancelled on 25 May.

20 March 2020 30	Bayern Munich (Germany)	Cancelled	(Turkey) Fenerbahçe Beko	Munich
20:30
		Boxscore		Arena: Audi Dome
Note: Postponed due to the coronavirus pandemic. Cancelled on 25 May.

24 March 2020 31	Žalgiris (Lithuania)	Cancelled	(Turkey) Fenerbahçe Beko	Kaunas
19:00
		Boxscore		Arena: Žalgirio Arena
Note: Postponed due to the coronavirus pandemic. Cancelled on 25 May.

26 March 2020 32	Fenerbahçe Beko (Turkey)	Cancelled	(Russia) CSKA Moscow	Istanbul
18:45
		Boxscore		Arena: Ülker Sports and Event Hall
Note: Postponed due to the coronavirus pandemic. Cancelled on 25 May.

2 April 2020 33	Fenerbahçe Beko (Turkey)	Cancelled	(Greece) Olympiacos	Istanbul
19:45
		Boxscore		Arena: Ülker Sports and Event Hall
Note: Postponed due to the coronavirus pandemic. Cancelled on 25 May.

10 April 2020 34	Anadolu Efes (Turkey)	Cancelled	(Turkey) Fenerbahçe Beko	Istanbul
19:30
		Boxscore		Arena: Sinan Erdem Dome
Note: Postponed due to the coronavirus pandemic. Cancelled on 25 May.

==== Individual awards ====
EuroLeague MVP of the Round

- (France) Nando de Colo – Regular Season, Round 3
- (Greece) Kostas Sloukas – Regular Season, Round 12

=== Turkish Basketball Cup ===
==== Quarterfinals ====
12 February 2020	Fenerbahçe Beko	100–70	Teksüt Bandırma	Istanbul
21:00	Scoring by quarter: 22–22, 24–10, 33–10, 21–18
	Pts: Mahmutoğlu 18; Rebs: Veselý 11; Asts: Sloukas 11; PIR: Veselý 24	Report	Pts: Terry 15; Rebs: Haltalı 6 Asts: Hummer, Kalinoski 3 PIR: Terry 19	Arena: Ülker Sports and Event Hall; Referees: Mehmet Keseratar, Mehmet Serdar Ünal, Kerem Baki

==== Semifinals ====
14 February 2020	Türk Telekom	81–83	Fenerbahçe Beko	Ankara
20:30	Scoring by quarter: 23–21, 25–24, 21–24, 12–14
	Pts: Campbell 19; Rebs: Türen 10; Asts: Campbell, Baygül 4 PIR: Campbell 19	Report	Pts: de Colo 19; Rebs: Kalinić, Veselý 8 Asts: Kalinić, Sloukas 4 PIR: Kalinić 25	Arena: Ankara Arena; Referees: Emin Moğulkoç, Mehmet Karabilecen, Semih Vural

==== Final ====
16 February 2020	Darüşşafaka Tekfen	71–74	Fenerbahçe Beko	Ankara
17:00	Scoring by quarter: 11–13, 19–17, 18–17, 23–27
	Pts: Hamilton 20; Rebs: Hamilton 10; Asts: Colson 5 PIR: Hamilton 19	Report	Pts: three players 15; Rebs: three players 5 Asts: Sloukas, Dixon 4 PIR: Datome 18	Arena: Ankara Arena; Referees: Erşan Kartal, Osman Sinan İşgüder, Seher Ayşe Nur Yazıcıoğlu

=== Turkish Basketball Presidential Cup ===
26 September 2019	Anadolu Efes	79–74	Fenerbahçe Beko	Gaziantep
19:00	Scoring by quarter: 19–20, 20–17, 25–15, 15–22
	Pts: Simon 22; Rebs: Peters 8 Asts: Micić 9	Report	Pts: Williams 16; Rebs: Düverioğlu 7 Asts: Sloukas 9	Arena: Karataş Şahinbey Sport Hall; Referees: Emin Moğulkoç, Mehmet Karabilecen, Kerem Baki

== Statistics ==
Legend
GP	Games played	GS	Games started	MPG	Minutes per game
FG%	Field-goal percentage	3FG%	3-point field-goal percentage	FT%	Free-throw percentage
RPG	Rebounds per game	APG	Assists per game	SPG	Steals per game
BPG	Blocks per game	PPG	Points per game	PIR	PIR per game

Player	Left during season

=== EuroLeague ===
Player	GP	GS	MPG	2FG%	3FG%	FT%	RPG	APG	SPG	BPG	PPG	PIR
Tarik Biberovic	6	1	10:42	.389	.000	.000	1.7	1	0	0.2	2.3	0.7
Berkay Candan	1	0	1:56	.000	.000	.000	0	0	0	0	0	0
Luigi Datome	28	15	22:25	.537	.431	.929	3.4	1.3	0.8	0.3	8.3	7.4
Nando de Colo	24	17	28:41	.575	.400	.956	3	3	0.6	0	15.9	16.5
Ahmet Düverioğlu	17	8	9:42	.571	.000	.625	2.5	0.4	0.3	0.3	2.9	3.5
Nikola Kalinić	26	12	22:54	.494	.314	.870	2.5	1.7	0.8	0.1	6.6	6.2
Joffrey Lauvergne	19	9	13:52	.563	.286	.441	2.7	0.8	0.2	0.2	6.3	6.6
Melih Mahmutoğlu	21	9	17:14	.395	.508	.800	0.8	0.5	0.3	0	6.5	3.4
Ali Muhammed	22	2	14:31	.577	.364	.947	1.3	1.3	0.5	0	5.5	5
James Nunnally	9	1	13:22	.500	.417	1.000	1.4	0.7	0.2	0.1	4.2	4.1
Ekrem Sancaklı	1	0	6:05	1.000	1.000	.000	1	0	0	0	5	5
Kostas Sloukas	25	19	29:03	.482	.422	.938	2.8	6.1	0.9	0	11.6	15.5
Malcolm Thomas	12	7	14:54	.419	.000	.900	3.6	1.1	0.8	0.1	2.9	4.8
Jan Veselý	18	10	25:22	.602	.000	.521	4.2	1.6	1.3	0.7	8.6	12.1
Léo Westermann	22	10	11:55	.364	.477	.714	1.6	1.8	0.4	0	3.8	3.4
Derrick Williams	28	20	26:05	.605	.373	.667	3.9	1.2	1.1	0.3	11.3	12.5
Vladimir Štimac	8	0	9:56	.700	.000	.962	2.5	0.4	0	0	4.6	5.4

Last updated: 6 March 2020.
Source: EuroLeague
