= İsmail Cem Ulusoy =

Turkish basketball player

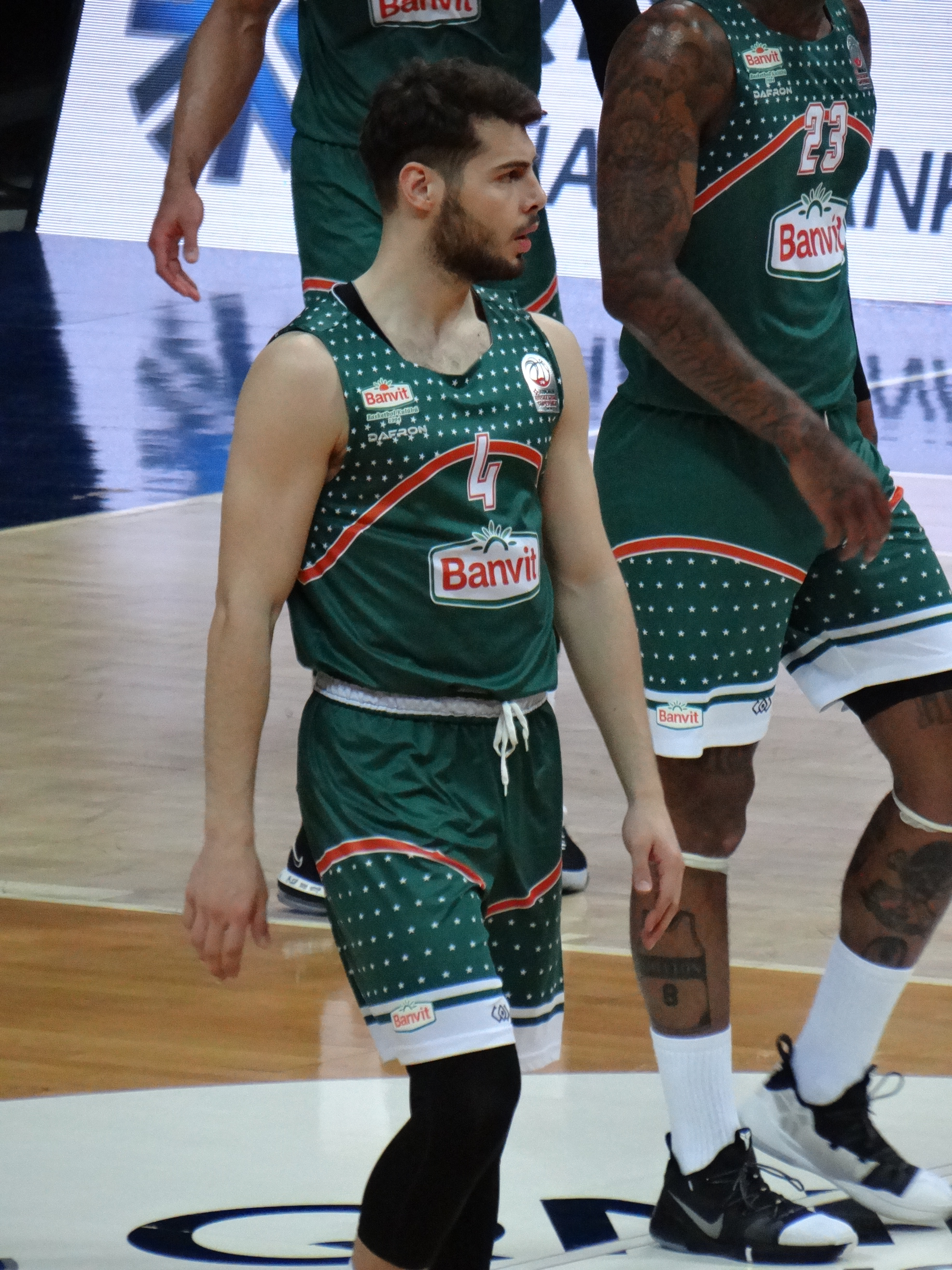
- Ulusoy with Banvit in 2019

No. 5 – Trabzonspor
- Position: Point guard
- League: Türkiye Basketbol Ligi

Personal information
- Born: 4 October 1996 (age 30) Antalya, Turkey
- Listed height: 6 ft 0 in (1.83 m)
- Listed weight: 165 lb (75 kg)

Career information
- Playing career: 2012–present

Career history
- 2012–2014: Bandırma Kırmızı
- 2014–2019: Banvit
- 2019–2022: Gaziantep Basketbol
- 2022–2023: Petkim Spor
- 2023–2024: Türk Telekom
- 2024–present: Trabzonspor

Career highlights
- Türkiye Basketbol Ligi champion (2025); All-Champions League Defensive Team (2019)

İsmail Cem Ulusoy (born 4 October 1996) is a Turkish professional basketball player for Trabzonspor of the Türkiye Basketbol Ligi (TBL). He plays as a point guard.
