= Lautaro López =

Lautaro López may refer to:

- Lautaro López (basketball) (born 1999), Argentine basketball player
- Lautaro López (footballer) (born 2005), Argentine footballer
