= Vladimir Štimac =

Serbian basketball player

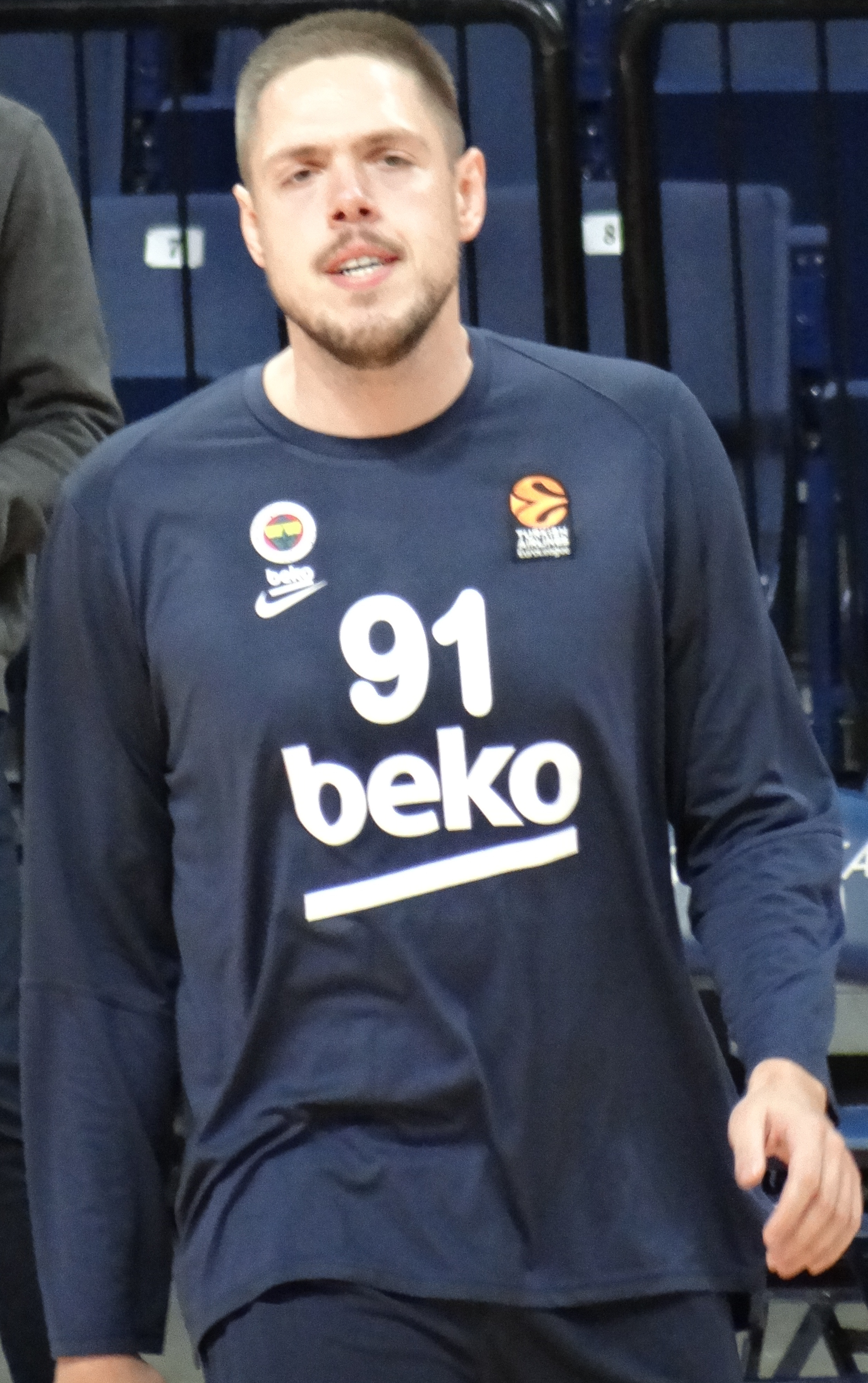
- Štimac with Fenerbahçe in 2019

Personal information
- Born: 25 August 1987 (age 39) Belgrade, SR Serbia, SFR Yugoslavia
- Listed height: 2.11 m (6 ft 11 in)
- Listed weight: 116 kg (256 lb)

Career information
- NBA draft: 2009: undrafted
- Playing career: 2004–2023
- Position: Center
- Number: 15, 51, 91

Career history
- 2004–2005: Beovuk 72
- 2005–2008: Žalgiris
- 2005–2007: →Žalgiris-Arvydas Sabonis school
- 2007–2008: →Valmiera
- 2008–2010: Crvena zvezda
- 2010–2011: Ventspils
- 2011: Nymburk
- 2011–2012: Olin Edirne
- 2012–2013: Banvit
- 2013–2014: Málaga
- 2014–2015: Bayern Munich
- 2015: Estudiantes
- 2015–2016: Crvena zvezda
- 2016–2017: Beşiktaş
- 2017–2018: Anadolu Efes
- 2018–2019: Türk Telekom
- 2019: Fenerbahçe
- 2019–2020: Crvena zvezda
- 2020: Qingdao Eagles
- 2021: Bahçeşehir Koleji
- 2021–2022: Ningbo Rockets
- 2023: Sigortam.net İTÜ BB
- 2023: Guangxi Rhinos

Career highlights
- CBA rebounding champion (2022); BCL Star Lineup Second Best Team (2017); ABA League champion (2016); Serbian League champion (2016); Czech League champion (2011); Czech Cup winner (2011); Turkish Cup winner (2018); BBL Most Valuable Player (2008); 2x BSL All-Star (2017, 2018); 2x BSL rebounding leader (2017, 2018)
Medals
Men's basketball
Representing Serbia
Summer Olympics
Silver medal – second place	2016 Rio de Janeiro	Team
World Cup
Silver medal – second place	2014 Spain	Team
EuroBasket
Silver medal – second place	2017 Finland–Israel–Romania–Turkey	Team
Universiade
Gold medal – first place	2011 Shenzhen	Team
Gold medal – first place	2009 Belgrade	Team
U20 European Championship
Gold medal – first place	2007 Slovenia	Team
Representing Serbia and Montenegro
U18 European Championship
Gold medal – first place	2005 Serbia and Montenegro	Team

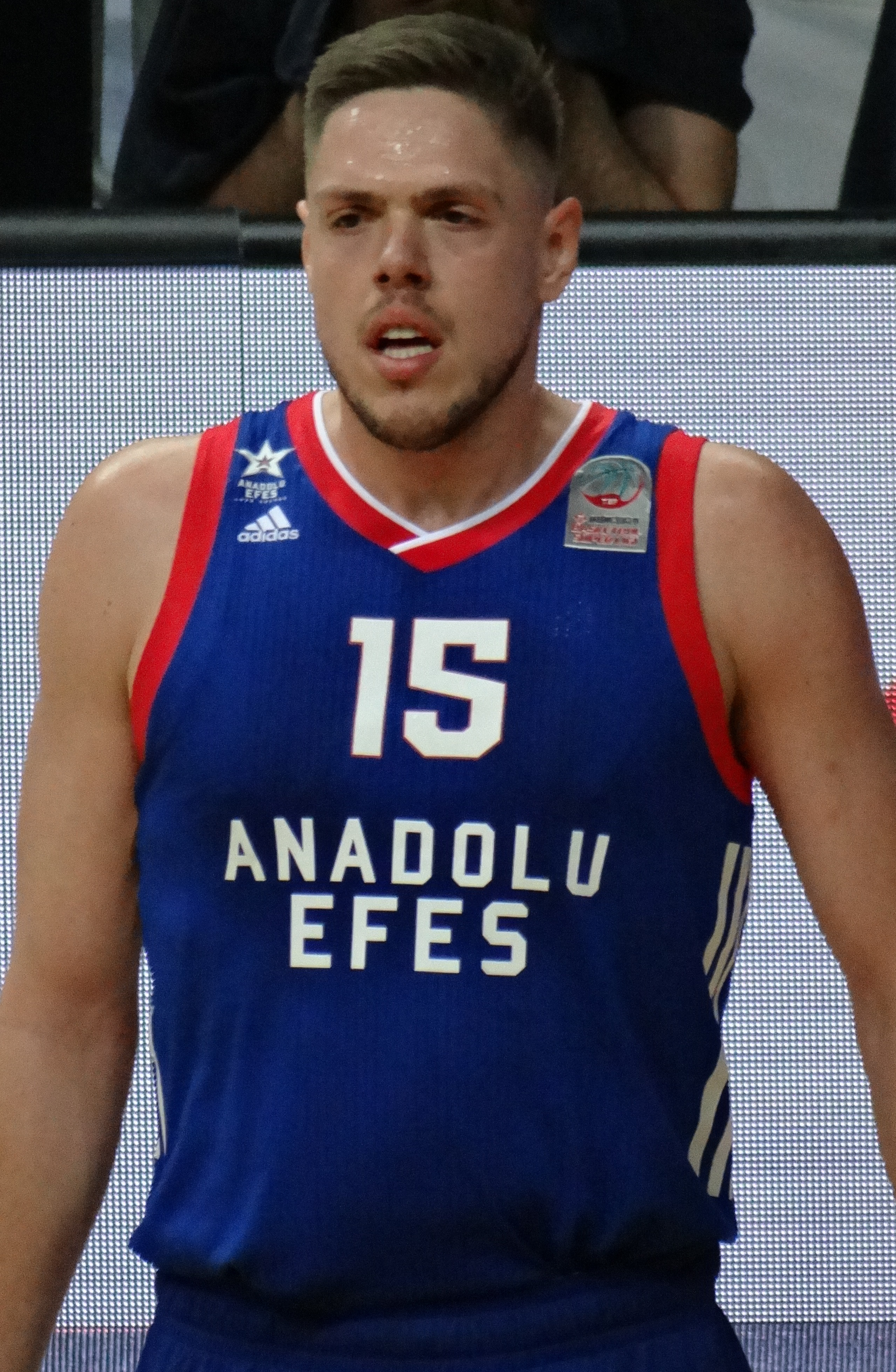
Štimac in 2018

Vladimir Štimac (Serbian: Владимир Штимац, born 25 August 1987) is a Serbian former professional basketball player, politician and activist. He also represented the Serbian national team internationally. Standing at 2.11 m (6 ft 11 in), he played at the center position. Štimac was affiliated with the New Democratic Party of Serbia (NDSS) and the National Democratic Alternative (NADA) coalition, now he is leader of his own movement called National Strength.

== Professional career ==
Štimac grew up with Beovuk 72 youth team, and later spent two years in Lithuania and one in Latvia before returning to Serbia. During his first season abroad, he played for the Lithuanian Žalgiris reserves team and earned his way into the first team for the following season. In order to get a chance to play as a first-team regular, he was allowed to spend his third SEB BBL year with Latvian side Valmiera, where he was unanimously chosen as the best player for the 2007–08 season.

He played for the Orlando Magic in the Orlando Pro Summer League in 2010. In September 2010, he signed with the Latvian team Ventspils but was released two months later. In November 2010, he signed a contract for the remainder of the season with Nymburk.

In July 2011, he signed a one-year contract with Olin Edirne Basket. In 30 games of Turkish League, he averaged 14.8 points and 9.9 rebounds per game. For the 2012–13 season he moved to Banvit.

In September 2013, he signed a 1+1 contract with the Spanish club Unicaja Málaga. In June 2014, he left Unicaja.

In August 2014, he signed a one-year deal with Bayern Munich.

On 2 October 2015, he signed a preliminary agreement with the Spanish team Estudiantes. On 27 October 2015, he returned to Crvena zvezda signing a contract for the rest of the season.

On 31 August 2016, Štimac signed with the Turkish club Beşiktaş for the 2016–17 season.

On 22 August 2017, Štimac signed a one-year deal, with an option for another, with Turkish club Anadolu Efes.

On 12 July 2018, Štimac signed with Türk Telekom for the 2018–19 season.

On 25 September 2019, he signed a three-month contract with Turkish EuroLeague team Fenerbahçe. He appeared in 8 EuroLeague games, averaging 4.6 points per game. In the midseason, on 25 December, he returned to Crvena zvezda. In 13 EuroLeague games with Crvena zvezda until the end of the season, which was cut short due to the COVID-19 pandemic, he averaged 11.1 points and 6.2 rebounds per game.

On 22 August 2020, Štimac signed with the French team AS Monaco. However on 12 September, his contract was bought out by the Qingdao Eagles in China. On 2 February 2021, he has signed with Bahçeşehir Koleji of the Turkish Basketball Super League (BSL).

In December 2021, Štimac returned to China and signed with Ningbo Rockets. On 26 December 2021, he recorded career-high 40 points, 17 rebounds and 7 assists in a game against the Sichuan Blue Whales.

== Serbian national team ==
He managed to win a 2007 U20 European Championship gold medal as a member of the Serbian U20 National Team 2007.

Štimac represented the Serbian national basketball team at the EuroBasket 2013. He was a member of the Serbian national basketball team that won the silver medal at the 2014 FIBA Basketball World Cup and at the 2016 Summer Olympics.

Štimac also represented Serbia at the 2016 Summer Olympics where they won the silver medal, after losing to the United States in the final game with 96–66.

Štimac also represented Serbia at the EuroBasket 2017 where they won the silver medal, after losing in the final game to Slovenia.

== Career statistics ==
Legend
GP	Games played	GS	Games started	MPG	Minutes per game
FG%	Field-goal percentage	3P%	3-point field-goal percentage	FT%	Free-throw percentage
RPG	Rebounds per game	APG	Assists per game	SPG	Steals per game
BPG	Blocks per game	PPG	Points per game	PIR	Performance index rating
**Bold**	Career high

=== EuroLeague ===
Year	Team	GP	GS	MPG	FG%	3P%	FT%	RPG	APG	SPG	BPG	PPG	PIR
2006–07	Žalgiris	2	1	18.0	.600	.000	.333	4.0	.5	.0	.0	4.0	6.5
2013–14	Unicaja	23	4	17.2	.603	.000	.524	5.1	.6	.3	.4	7.6	9.9
2014–15	Bayern	10	2	15.3	.542	.333	.667	4.1	.6	.2	.2	6.9	7.8
2015–16	Crvena zvezda	25	0	14.6	.550	.000	.594	5.0	.5	.3	.2	6.9	9.2
2017–18	Anadolu Efes	**30**	**11**	18.3	.583	.000	**.694**	5.8	1.0	**.6**	.3	9.4	13.9
2019–20	Fenerbahçe	8	0	10.1	**.700**	.000	.692	.4	.0	.0	.0	4.6	5.6
2019–20	Crvena zvezda	13	4	**22.9**	.596	**.375**	.659	**6.2**	**1.1**	.5	**.5**	**11.2**	**14.0**
**Career**		111	22	16.6	.590	.250	.629	5.1	.7	.4	.3	8.0	10.7

== Political activities ==
In October 2023, Štimac stated he's considering taking part in the upcoming Belgrade City Assembly election. A supporter of cryptocurrency and anti-discrimination politics, Štimac was also previously involved in a conflict with the "Milenijum tim" company which retains close relations with the ruling Serbian Progressive Party (SNS). Štimac confirmed his candidacy once the election was called. Štimac signed an agreement with the right-wing National Democratic Alternative (NADA) on 3 November, announcing that he would run on their electoral list. He was elected to the City Assembly of Belgrade.

Štimac has been active during the 2024 Serbian environmental protests against Rio Tinto lithium mine. Not long after, Štimac was branded an "eco-terrorist" by a pro-government and pro-Rio Tinto anonymous political organization "Kopaćemo". Štimac filed a criminal complaint against the group.

On 8 November 2024, Štimac announced that he is filing a request to establish a citizens' association called "Nacionalna Snaga". On 30 November, Štimac began a 24-hour protest in front of the Presidency of Serbia, with a request to assume political responsibility for the Novi Sad railway station canopy collapse and the death of 16 people.

== See also ==
- List of Olympic medalists in basketball
