= Youssoupha Fall =

Senegalese basketball player

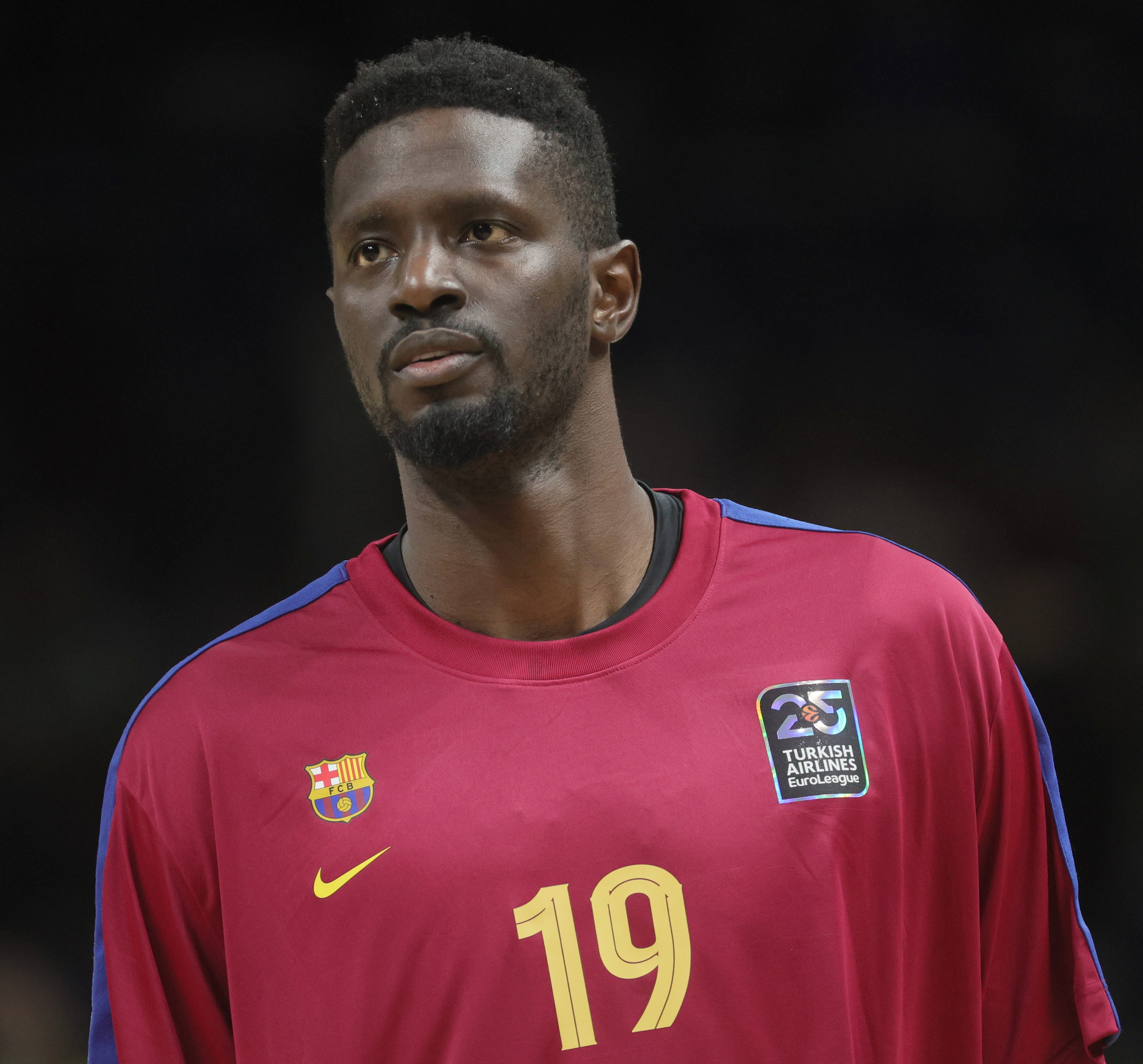
- Fall with FC Barcelona in 2025

No. 19 – Nanjing Monkey Kings
- Position: Center
- League: CBA

Personal information
- Born: January 12, 1995 (age 31) Dakar, Senegal
- Listed height: 7 ft 3 in (2.21 m)
- Listed weight: 275 lb (125 kg)

Career information
- Playing career: 2014–present

Career history
- 2014–2018: Le Mans Sarthe
- 2016–2017: →Poitiers 86
- 2018–2021: Baskonia
- 2018–2019: →SIG Strasbourg
- 2021–2024: ASVEL
- 2024–2026: FC Barcelona
- 2026–present: Nanjing Monkey Kings

Career highlights
- Champions League All-Defensive Team (2019); All-LNB Élite Second Team (2024); 2x Pro A champion (2018, 2022); Liga ACB champion (2020); Leaders Cup winner (2019)

Youssoupha Birima Fall (born January 12, 1995) is a Senegalese professional basketball player for the Nanjing Monkey Kings of the Chinese Basketball Association (CBA).

== Professional career ==
Fall attended the Seeds Academy in Thiès, Senegal, before joining the youth ranks of French team Le Mans Sarthe Basket in 2012.

=== Le Mans Sarthe (2014–2018) ===
He made his debut on Le Mans’ men's team during the 2014-15 season. In 2015, he was named to the "Cinq All Star Espoirs", the all-first team of the French development league, after averaging 12.6 points, 12.0 rebounds and 2.1 blocks per contest during the 2014-15 campaign.

An early entry candidate for the 2016 NBA draft, he later withdrew his name from the list. He was sent on loan to LNB Pro B side Poitiers Baskets 86 for the 2016–17 season. In his last year with Le Mans, the 2017-18 season, Fall won his first French championship.

=== Baskonia (2018–2021) ===
On July 17, 2018, he signed a four-year deal with Kirolbet Baskonia of the Spanish Liga ACB and the EuroLeague. On August 9, 2018, Baskonia loaned him to SIG Strasbourg for the 2018–19 season. Fall was part of Baskonia's championship winning team in the 2019-20 ACB season, but he would miss the Final Four due to injury. On August 15, 2021, Fall officially parted ways with the Basque club.

=== ASVEL Basket (2021–2024) ===
Fall signed with ASVEL Basket on August 16, 2021. Fall's contract with ASVEL was extended with two more years on July 19, 2022, after having helped the Lyon-based team win the 2021-22 LNB Pro A.

=== FC Barcelona (2024–2026) ===
On July 31, 2024, Fall was announced as a new FC Barcelona player, signing a one year deal with the Catalans. During the 2024-25 season, his role in the team grew as the Barcelona roster was plagued with injuries. Barcelona announced Fall would be leaving the team as his contract expired on June 30, 2025. However, the board reversed the decision and Fall signed a one season contract extension on August 19, 2025.

=== Nanjing Monkey Kings (2026–present) ===
On August 5, 2026, he signed with the Nanjing Monkey Kings of the Chinese Basketball Association.

== National team ==
Fall was invited to play both for Senegal and for France, but has not been active in national team competition thus far. In September 2022, he expressed his will to represent Senegal's national team.

== Career statistics ==
Legend
| GP | Games played | GS | Games started | MPG | Minutes per game |
| FG% | Field-goal percentage | 3P% | 3-point field-goal percentage | FT% | Free-throw percentage |
| RPG | Rebounds per game | APG | Assists per game | SPG | Steals per game |
| BPG | Blocks per game | PPG | Points per game | PIR | Performance index rating |
| **Bold** | Career high |

=== EuroLeague ===
| * | Led the league |

| Year | Team | GP | GS | MPG | FG% | 3P% | FT% | RPG | APG | SPG | BPG | PPG | PIR |
|---|---|---|---|---|---|---|---|---|---|---|---|---|---|
| 2019–20 | Baskonia | 28* | 6 | 13.5 | .615 | — | .452 | 4.8 | .1 | .2 | .6 | 5.8 | 7.3 |
| 2020–21 | Baskonia | 32 | 16 | 11.7 | .628 | — | **.757** | 3.2 | **.5** | **.5** | **.7** | 7.0 | 8.1 |
| 2021–22 | ASVEL | 28 | 9 | 12.6 | **.705** | — | .725 | 3.6 | .1 | .3 | .1 | 5.8 | 7.6 |
| 2022–23 | ASVEL | **34** | 27 | **19.9** | .685 | — | .697 | 6.1 | .3 | .3 | .3 | **9.3** | 12.5 |
| 2023–24 | ASVEL | 31 | **29** | 19.7 | .613 | — | .592 | **6.6** | .3 | .3 | .6 | 8.8 | **12.8** |
| 2024–25 | Barcelona | 29 | 18 | 10.2 | .701 | — | .667 | 3.3 | .0 | .1 | .2 | 4.4 | 5.2 |
| Career | | 182 | 105 | 14.5 | .652 | — | .647 | 4.7 | .2 | .3 | .4 | 7.0 | 9.0 |

=== EuroCup ===
| Year | Team | GP | GS | MPG | FG% | 3P% | FT% | RPG | APG | SPG | BPG | PPG | PIR |
|---|---|---|---|---|---|---|---|---|---|---|---|---|---|
| 2015–16 | Le Mans | 6 | 0 | 6.3 | .000 | — | 1.000 | .8 | .2 | — | .5 | 0.3 | 0.5 |
| Career | | 6 | 0 | 6.3 | .000 | — | 1.000 | .8 | .2 | — | .5 | 0.3 | 0.5 |

=== Basketball Champions League ===
| Year | Team | GP | GS | MPG | FG% | 3P% | FT% | RPG | APG | SPG | BPG | PPG |
|---|---|---|---|---|---|---|---|---|---|---|---|---|
| 2018–19 | SIG Strasbourg | 12 | 11 | 22.0 | .627 | — | .667 | 7.5 | .5 | .2 | 1.7 | 11.5 |
| Career | | 12 | 11 | 22.0 | .627 | — | .667 | 7.5 | .5 | .2 | 1.7 | 11.5 |

=== FIBA EuroChallenge ===
| Year | Team | GP | GS | MPG | FG% | 3P% | FT% | RPG | APG | SPG | BPG | PPG |
|---|---|---|---|---|---|---|---|---|---|---|---|---|
| 2014–15 | Le Mans | 1 | 0 | 1.0 | — | — | — | 1.0 | — | — | — | 0.0 |
| Career | | 1 | 0 | 1.0 | — | — | — | 1.0 | — | — | — | 0.0 |

=== Domestic leagues ===
| Year | Team | League | GP | MPG | FG% | 3P% | FT% | RPG | APG | SPG | BPG | PPG |
|---|---|---|---|---|---|---|---|---|---|---|---|---|
| 2015–16 | (France) Le Mans | Pro A | 17 | 5.1 | .423 | — | .500 | 1.6 | .1 | — | .3 | 1.3 |
| 2016–17 | (France) Poitiers | Pro B | 33 | 21.2 | .664 | — | .574 | 7.0 | .8 | .3 | 1.5 | 10.4 |
| 2017–18 | (France) Le Mans | Pro A | 47 | 20.7 | .674 | .000 | .431 | 6.5 | .4 | .3 | .9 | 10.2 |
| 2018–19 | (France) SIG Strasbourg | LNB Élite | 32 | 23.0 | .687 | — | .621 | 8.2 | .6 | .7 | 1.4 | 14.3 |
| 2019–20 | (Spain) Baskonia | ACB | 24 | 12.6 | .699 | — | .596 | 3.9 | .1 | .2 | .6 | 5.4 |
| 2020–21 | (Spain) Baskonia | ACB | 31 | 11.7 | .598 | — | .681 | 3.8 | .3 | .1 | .7 | 5.8 |
| 2021–22 | (France) ASVEL | LNB Élite | 42 | 18.1 | .725 | — | .667 | 5.5 | .3 | .2 | .9 | 9.6 |
| 2022–23 | (France) ASVEL | LNB Élite | 38 | 19.7 | .779 | — | .634 | 6.8 | .3 | .4 | .7 | 11.4 |
| 2023–24 | (France) ASVEL | LNB Élite | 41 | 19.0 | .713 | — | .655 | 7.7 | .3 | .3 | .6 | 10.8 |

== Personal life ==
Fall was granted French citizenship in March 2017.
