= 2021–22 EuroLeague regular season =

Men's basketball season

The 2021–22 EuroLeague Regular Season is the premier European competition for men's basketball clubs. A total of 18 teams compete in the regular season to decide the eight places of the playoffs.

== Format ==
In the regular season, teams play against each other home-and-away in a round-robin format. The eight first qualified teams will advance to the Playoffs, while the last ten qualified teams will be eliminated. The matchdays are from 30 September 2021 to 8 April 2022.

=== Tiebreakers ===
When all teams have played each other twice:

1. Best record in head-to-head games between all tied teams.
2. Higher cumulative score difference in head-to-head games between all tied teams.
3. Higher cumulative score difference for the entire regular season.
4. Higher total of points scored for the entire regular season.
5. Higher sum of quotients of points in favor and points against of each match played in the regular season.

If a tiebreaker does not resolve a tie completely, a new tiebreak process is initiated with only those teams that remain tied. All points scored in extra periods will not be counted in the standings, nor for any tie-break situation.

== League table ==
Pos	Team	Pld	W	L	PF	PA	PD	Qualification
1	(Spain) Barcelona	28	21	7	2275	2101	+174	Qualification to playoffs
2	(Greece) Olympiacos	28	19	9	2222	2045	+177	Qualification to playoffs
3	(Italy) A|X Armani Exchange Milan	28	19	9	2069	1992	+77	Qualification to playoffs
4	(Spain) Real Madrid	28	18	10	2181	2079	+102	Qualification to playoffs
5	(Israel) Maccabi Tel Aviv	28	17	11	2272	2209	+63	Qualification to playoffs
6	(Turkey) Anadolu Efes	28	16	12	2322	2221	+101	Qualification to playoffs
7	(France) AS Monaco	28	15	13	2311	2225	+86	Qualification to playoffs
8	(Germany) Bayern Munich	28	14	14	2123	2105	+18	Qualification to playoffs
9	(Spain) Bitci Baskonia	28	12	16	2116	2186	−70	
10	(Germany) ALBA Berlin	28	12	16	2121	2239	−118	
11	(Serbia) Crvena zvezda mts	28	12	16	2041	2089	−48	
12	(Turkey) Fenerbahçe Beko	28	10	18	2051	2099	−48	
13	(Greece) Panathinaikos OPAP	28	9	19	2089	2235	−146	
14	(France) LDLC ASVEL	28	8	20	2036	2239	−203	
15	(Lithuania) Žalgiris	28	8	20	2084	2249	−165	
16	(Russia) Zenit Saint Petersburg	0	0	0	0	0	0	Excluded
17	(Russia) CSKA Moscow	0	0	0	0	0	0	Excluded
18	(Russia) UNICS	0	0	0	0	0	0	Excluded

Source: EuroLeague
Rules for classification: All points scored in extra period(s) were not counted in the standings, nor for any tie-break situation.

== Results by round ==
The table lists the results of teams in each round.

Win	Loss	Postponed

Team ╲ Round	1	2	3	4	5	6	7	8	9	10	11	12	13	14	15	16	17	18	19	20	21	22	23	24	25	26	27	28	29	30	31	32	33	34
Real Madrid	W	L	W	W	W	W	L	W	W	W	W	W	W	L	W	W	W	L	W	L	W	W	W	W	W	L	L	P	W	W	L	L	L	L
Barcelona	W	W	W	W	W	W	L	L	W	W	W	W	W	W	W	W	W	L	P	L	W	L	W	W	W	W	P	W	L	W	W	W	L	L
A|X Armani Exchange Milan	W	W	W	W	W	L	W	W	W	L	L	L	L	W	W	L	W	W	P	W	P	W	W	W	L	W	L	W	L	W	L	W	L	W
Zenit Saint Petersburg	W	W	L	W	L	L	W	W	W	W	W	L	L	L	W	W	W	W	P	P	P	L	W	W	L	P	P	P	P	P	P	P	P	P
CSKA Moscow	L	W	W	W	W	L	L	L	W	L	W	W	W	W	L	W	L	P	P	W	W	L	W	L	W	P	P	P	P	P	P	P	P	P
Olympiacos	W	W	L	W	L	W	W	W	L	L	W	W	W	L	W	W	W	P	L	L	P	L	L	L	W	W	W	W	L	W	L	W	W	P
UNICS	L	L	W	L	L	W	W	L	W	W	W	W	L	W	W	W	L	W	L	P	P	W	L	L	W	P	P	P	P	P	P	P	P	P
Anadolu Efes	L	L	L	L	W	L	W	L	W	W	W	W	L	L	W	W	W	L	W	L	L	W	L	W	W	L	W	W	L	W	W	L	W	L
AS Monaco	W	W	L	L	L	W	W	L	W	L	L	L	L	L	W	L	L	W	W	P	W	W	L	W	W	L	W	L	W	P	W	W	W	W
Bayern Munich	L	L	L	L	W	W	W	L	L	W	W	L	W	W	L	L	L	W	L	W	L	W	W	L	W	L	P	L	P	L	L	P	W	W
Fenerbahçe Beko	W	L	L	W	L	L	L	W	L	L	L	L	W	W	W	W	L	W	L	W	L	W	L	W	W	W	L	L	P	P	L	L	P	L
Maccabi Tel Aviv	W	L	L	W	W	W	W	W	L	W	L	L	L	L	L	L	L	L	W	W	W	W	W	W	L	P	L	P	L	P	W	W	W	W
LDLC ASVEL	W	W	W	L	L	W	W	W	L	L	L	W	L	L	L	L	W	L	L	P	L	W	L	L	L	L	L	P	L	L	W	L	L	L
Crvena zvezda mts	L	W	W	L	L	L	L	W	W	L	L	L	W	W	L	W	L	L	W	W	L	L	W	L	L	P	L	W	W	L	P	L	L	W
ALBA Berlin	L	L	W	L	W	L	L	W	L	L	L	W	W	L	L	L	W	L	W	L	W	L	L	W	L	P	W	W	W	L	L	W	L	L
Bitci Baskonia	L	L	W	W	W	L	L	L	L	W	L	L	L	W	L	L	W	W	L	W	L	L	L	L	L	L	P	L	W	W	W	L	W	P
Panathinaikos OPAP	L	W	L	L	L	W	L	L	L	L	L	W	L	W	L	L	L	L	L	L	L	L	W	L	L	W	W	L	P	L	W	P	W	W
Žalgiris	L	L	L	L	L	L	L	L	L	W	W	L	W	L	L	L	L	W	W	L	W	L	L	L	L	W	W	L	W	L	L	P	L	P

Source: EuroLeague

== Matches ==
=== Round 1 ===
30 September 2021	AS Monaco (France)	75–63	(Greece) Panathinaikos OPAP	Fontvieille
19:00 (CET)	Scoring by quarter: 22–15, 16–13, 18–16, 19–19
	Pts: Anđušić 17; Rebs: James 6 Asts: Lee 5 PIR: Anđušić 17	Boxscore	Pts: Papapetrou 16; Rebs: Papagiannis 11; Asts: Macon 3 PIR: Papapetrou 15	Arena: Salle Gaston Médecin; Attendance: 2,151; Referees: Daniel Hierrezuelo, Milivoje Jovčić, Sébastien Clivaz

30 September 2021	Maccabi Tel Aviv (Israel)	69–68	(Germany) Bayern Munich	Tel Aviv
20:05 (CET)	Scoring by quarter: 25–18, 15–14, 14–26, 15–10
	Pts: Wilbekin 28; Rebs: Reynolds 6 Asts: Wilbekin 3 PIR: Wilbekin 32	Boxscore	Pts: Thomas 15; Rebs: Thomas 7 Asts: Hilliard 6 PIR: Walden 18	Arena: Menora Mivtachim Arena; Attendance: 10,090; Referees: Luigi Lamonica, Benjamín Jiménez, Luka Kardum

30 September 2021	A|X Armani Exchange Milan (Italy)	84–74	(Russia) CSKA Moscow	Assago
20:30 (CET)	Scoring by quarter: 21–29, 23–16, 18–14, 22–15
	Pts: Rodríguez, Shields 17; Rebs: Shields 7 Asts: Shields 5 PIR: Melli 24	Boxscore	Pts: Lundberg 13; Rebs: Lundberg, Voigtmann 7 Asts: Lundberg 6 PIR: Lundberg 23	Arena: Mediolanum Forum; Attendance: 3,120; Referees: Miguel Ángel Pérez, Damir Javor, Mehdi Difallah

30 September 2021	Real Madrid (Spain)	82–69	(Turkey) Anadolu Efes	Madrid
20:45 (CET)	Scoring by quarter: 32–15, 18–20, 18–13, 14–21
	Pts: Heurtel, Yabusele 15; Rebs: Tavares 12; Asts: Yabusele 4 PIR: Tavares 24	Boxscore	Pts: Larkin 21; Rebs: Larkin 4 Asts: Larkin 6 PIR: Larkin 35	Arena: WiZink Center; Attendance: 4,050; Referees: Robert Lottermoser, Oļegs Latiševs, Carmelo Paternicò

1 October 2021	UNICS (Russia)	69–70	(Russia) Zenit Saint Petersburg	Kazan
18:00 (CET)	Scoring by quarter: 22–18, 11–15, 16–18, 20–19
	Pts: Canaan 18; Rebs: Hezonja, J. Brown 4 Asts: L. Brown 6 PIR: J. Brown 15	Boxscore	Pts: Frankamp 18; Rebs: Zubkov 7 Asts: Ponitka 4 PIR: Frankamp 16	Arena: Basket-Hall Kazan; Attendance: 3,021; Referees: Sreten Radović, Emin Moğulkoç, Kristaps Konstantinovs

1 October 2021	Fenerbahçe Beko (Turkey)	61–57	(Serbia) Crvena zvezda mts	Istanbul
19:45 (CET)	Scoring by quarter: 18–15, 10–11, 17–11, 16–20
	Pts: Pierre 13; Rebs: Booker 9 Asts: Henry 6 PIR: Pierre 19	Boxscore	Pts: Ivanović 16; Rebs: Kalinić 9 Asts: Ivanović 6 PIR: Ivanović 20	Arena: Ülker Sports and Event Hall; Attendance: 1,892; Referees: Fernando Rocha, Elias Koromilas, Joseph Bissang

1 October 2021	LDLC ASVEL (France)	88–76	(Lithuania) Žalgiris	Villeurbanne
20:00 (CET)	Scoring by quarter: 19–16, 25–20, 19–19, 25–21
	Pts: Okobo 23; Rebs: Fall 9 Asts: Jones 6 PIR: Okobo 24	Boxscore	Pts: Strēlnieks 21; Rebs: Giffey 7 Asts: Cavanaugh 3 PIR: Strēlnieks 23	Arena: Astroballe; Attendance: 4,215; Referees: Saša Pukl, Anne Panther, Carlos Cortés

1 October 2021	Olympiacos (Greece)	75–50	(Spain) Bitci Baskonia	Piraeus
20:00 (CET)	Scoring by quarter: 28–13, 19–9, 16–20, 12–8
	Pts: Vezenkov 16; Rebs: Jean-Charles 7 Asts: Sloukas 5 PIR: Fall, Vezenkov 16	Boxscore	Pts: Giedraitis 15; Rebs: Costello 9 Asts: Kurucs 5 PIR: Giedraitis 16	Arena: Peace and Friendship Stadium; Attendance: 5,780; Referees: Matej Boltauzer, Tomislav Hordov, Rain Peerandi

1 October 2021	Barcelona (Spain)	96–64	(Germany) ALBA Berlin	Barcelona
21:00 (CET)	Scoring by quarter: 28–15, 22–14, 13–17, 33–18
	Pts: Mirotić 22; Rebs: three players 5 Asts: Laprovíttola 7 PIR: Mirotić 31	Boxscore	Pts: Sikma 16; Rebs: Sikma 11; Asts: Sikma 4 PIR: Sikma 23	Arena: Palau Blaugrana; Attendance: 3,049; Referees: Ilija Beloševic, Milan Nedović, Hugues Thépénier

=== Round 2 ===
7 October 2021	Žalgiris (Lithuania)	64–70	(Russia) Zenit Saint Petersburg	Kaunas
19:00 (CET)	Scoring by quarter: 16–21, 18–19, 17–15, 13–15
	Pts: Strēlnieks 14; Rebs: Jankūnas 7 Asts: Lekavičius 6 PIR: Nebo 14	Boxscore	Pts: Loyd 19; Rebs: Ponitka, Mickey 6 Asts: Ponitka 6 PIR: Loyd 19	Arena: Žalgirio arena Attendance: 10,153; Referees: Damir Javor, Elias Koromilas, Gentian Cici

7 October 2021	Panathinaikos OPAP (Greece)	91–87	(Turkey) Fenerbahçe Beko	Athens
20:00 (CET)	Scoring by quarter: 20–21, 25–25, 19–21, 27–20
	Pts: Nedović 20; Rebs: White 9 Asts: Macon, Papapetrou 4 PIR: Nedović 20	Boxscore	Pts: Veselý 18; Rebs: Veselý 10; Asts: Veselý, Gudurić 5 PIR: Veselý 24	Arena: OAKA Altion; Attendance: 5,300; Referees: Miguel Ángel Pérez, Gytis Vilius, Miloš Koljenšić

7 October 2021	Maccabi Tel Aviv (Israel)	63–75	(Serbia) Crvena zvezda mts	Tel Aviv
20:05 (CET)	Scoring by quarter: 10–20, 17–15, 10–19, 26–21
	Pts: Wilbekin 18; Rebs: Nunnally 5 Asts: Wilbekin 4 PIR: Lessort 21	Boxscore	Pts: Kalinić 19; Rebs: Mitrović 11; Asts: Kalinić 5 PIR: Kalinić 22	Arena: Menora Mivtachim Arena; Attendance: 9,891; Referees: Matej Boltauzer, Michele Rossi, Ioannis Foufis

7 October 2021	Bayern Munich (Germany)	72–80	(Spain) Barcelona	Munich
20:30 (CET)	Scoring by quarter: 15–16, 18–28, 14–19, 25–17
	Pts: Hilliard 18; Rebs: Thomas 4 Asts: Šiško 4 PIR: Hilliard 16	Boxscore	Pts: Higgins 16; Rebs: Mirotić 4 Asts: Higgins 5 PIR: Higgins 25	Arena: Audi Dome; Attendance: 3,152; Referees: Oļegs Latiševs, Milivoje Jovčić, Saulius Račys

8 October 2021	UNICS (Russia)	80–88(OT)	(France) AS Monaco	Kazan
18:00 (CET)	Scoring by quarter: 15–18, 20–21, 23–11, 16–24, Overtime: 6–14
	Pts: Hezonja 17; Rebs: J. Brown, Jekiri 7 Asts: Zaytsev 5 PIR: L. Brown 14	Boxscore	Pts: Hall 16; Rebs: Hall, Motiejūnas 8 Asts: Westermann 6 PIR: Hall 21	Arena: Basket-Hall Kazan; Attendance: 3,323; Referees: Ilija Beloševic, Amit Balak, Igor Dragojević

8 October 2021	Anadolu Efes (Turkey)	96–100	(Russia) CSKA Moscow	Istanbul
19:30 (CET)	Scoring by quarter: 21–26, 25–25, 22–28, 28–21
	Pts: Micić 32; Rebs: Anderson 7 Asts: Larkin 7 PIR: Micić 23	Boxscore	Pts: Shengelia 23; Rebs: Voigtmann 9 Asts: Voigtmann 7 PIR: Shengelia 29	Arena: Sinan Erdem Dome; Attendance: 7,412; Referees: Juan Carlos García, Sašo Petek, Uroš Nikolić

8 October 2021	ALBA Berlin (Germany)	67–71	(France) LDLC ASVEL	Berlin
20:00 (CET)	Scoring by quarter: 18–13, 13–21, 12–15, 24–22
	Pts: Lô 22; Rebs: Sikma 7 Asts: Sikma, Lô 3 PIR: Lô 20	Boxscore	Pts: Jones 24; Rebs: Okobo 7 Asts: Okobo 3 PIR: Jones 20	Arena: Mercedes-Benz Arena; Attendance: 3,277; Referees: Oļegs Latiševs, Leandro Lezcano, Jordi Aliaga

8 October 2021	Olympiacos (Greece)	74–68	(Spain) Real Madrid	Piraeus
20:00 (CET)	Scoring by quarter: 13–10, 22–26, 19–16, 20–16
	Pts: Vezenkov 16; Rebs: Vezenkov 10; Asts: Walkup 5 PIR: Vezenkov 18	Boxscore	Pts: Williams-Goss 16; Rebs: Yabusele 7 Asts: Heurtel 5 PIR: Tavares 24	Arena: Peace and Friendship Stadium; Attendance: 7,235; Referees: Borys Ryzhyk, Fernando Rocha, Piotr Pastusiak

8 October 2021	Bitci Baskonia (Spain)	64–78	(Italy) A|X Armani Exchange Milan	Vitoria-Gasteiz
20:30 (CET)	Scoring by quarter: 17–19, 13–19, 17–19, 17–21
	Pts: Fontecchio 16; Rebs: three players 6 Asts: Baldwin 4 PIR: Giedraitis 20	Boxscore	Pts: Delaney 13; Rebs: Shields 10; Asts: Rodríguez 6 PIR: Melli 16	Arena: Buesa Arena; Attendance: 7,487; Referees: Robert Lottermoser, Mario Majkić, Luka Kardum

=== Round 3 ===
12 October 2021	UNICS (Russia)	73–70	(Germany) Bayern Munich	Kazan
18:00 (CET)	Scoring by quarter: 12–19, 14–18, 19–13, 28–20
	Pts: Canaan 21; Rebs: Jekiri 10; Asts: L. Brown 5 PIR: Hezonja 21	Boxscore	Pts: Hilliard 17; Rebs: Hilliard 7 Asts: Hilliard, Weiler-Babb 3 PIR: Walden 18	Arena: Basket-Hall Kazan; Attendance: 1,033; Referees: Damir Javor, Piotr Pastusiak, Jurgis Laurinavičius

12 October 2021	CSKA Moscow (Russia)	77–67	(Russia) Zenit Saint Petersburg	Moscow
19:00 (CET)	Scoring by quarter: 21–14, 15–17, 23–21, 18–15
	Pts: Shengelia 33; Rebs: Shengelia 8 Asts: Hackett 5 PIR: Shengelia 36	Boxscore	Pts: Loyd 19; Rebs: Gudaitis 6 Asts: Loyd, Ponitka 4 PIR: Loyd 20	Arena: Megasport Arena; Attendance: 2,027; Referees: Ilija Belošević, Milan Nedović, Joseph Bissang

12 October 2021	ALBA Berlin (Germany)	84–70	(Turkey) Fenerbahçe Beko	Berlin
20:00 (CET)	Scoring by quarter: 18–19, 9–16, 30–18, 27–17
	Pts: da Silva 22; Rebs: Sikma 9 Asts: Smith 7 PIR: Lô 27	Boxscore	Pts: de Colo 15; Rebs: Veselý 11; Asts: de Colo 8 PIR: de Colo 26	Arena: Mercedes-Benz Arena; Attendance: 6,176; Referees: Daniel Hierrezuelo, Jakub Zamojski, Ioannis Foufis

12 October 2021	LDLC ASVEL (France)	75–73	(Turkey) Anadolu Efes	Villeurbanne
20:00 (CET)	Scoring by quarter: 20–25, 15–24, 18–13, 22–11
	Pts: Jones 16; Rebs: Okobo, Jones 6 Asts: Okobo 10; PIR: Okobo 17	Boxscore	Pts: Micić 24; Rebs: Pleiß 11; Asts: Larkin 6 PIR: Micić 21	Arena: Astroballe; Attendance: 4,677; Referees: Sreten Radović, Tomasz Trawicki, Benjamin Barth

12 October 2021	A|X Armani Exchange Milan (Italy)	83–72	(Israel) Maccabi Tel Aviv	Assago
20:30 (CET)	Scoring by quarter: 26–15, 26–15, 11–19, 20–23
	Pts: Hall 17; Rebs: Mitoglou 6 Asts: Rodríguez 6 PIR: Mitoglou 20	Boxscore	Pts: Williams 16; Rebs: Nunnally 7 Asts: Nunnally 5 PIR: Nunnally 20	Arena: Mediolanum Forum; Attendance: 3,012; Referees: Saša Pukl, Emilio Pérez, Tomislav Hordov

12 October 2021	Bitci Baskonia (Spain)	81–79	(Greece) Panathinaikos OPAP	Vitoria-Gasteiz
20:30 (CET)	Scoring by quarter: 15–17, 25–18, 21–24, 20–20
	Pts: Fontecchio, Giedraitis 16; Rebs: Nnoko 9 Asts: Granger 9 PIR: Sedekerskis, Granger 22	Boxscore	Pts: Papapetrou 22; Rebs: Papagiannis 8 Asts: Papapetrou 4 PIR: Papapetrou 24	Arena: Buesa Arena; Attendance: 7,602; Referees: Borys Ryzhyk, Fernando Rocha, Anne Panther

13 October 2021	Crvena zvezda mts (Serbia)	73–61	(Lithuania) Žalgiris	Belgrade
19:00 (CET)	Scoring by quarter: 13–14, 16–13, 17–15, 27–19
	Pts: Kalinić 15; Rebs: Mitrović 7 Asts: Wolters 7 PIR: Kalinić 19	Boxscore	Pts: Nebo 14; Rebs: Nebo 10; Asts: Strēlnieks 4 PIR: Nebo 24	Arena: Štark Arena; Attendance: 7,893; Referees: Juan Carlos García, Emin Moğulkoç, Robert Vyklický

13 October 2021	Real Madrid (Spain)	94–86	(France) AS Monaco	Madrid
20:45 (CET)	Scoring by quarter: 30–12, 21–27, 21–26, 22–21
	Pts: Yabusele 18; Rebs: Tavares 6 Asts: Heurtel 7 PIR: Yabusele 25	Boxscore	Pts: James 24; Rebs: Hall 7 Asts: James 10; PIR: James 34	Arena: WiZink Center; Attendance: 3,087; Referees: Luigi Lamonica, Marcin Kowalski, Mykola Ambrosov

13 October 2021	Barcelona (Spain)	79–78(OT)	(Greece) Olympiacos	Barcelona
21:00 (CET)	Scoring by quarter: 10–17, 17–15, 28–15, 12–20, Overtime: 12–11
	Pts: Mirotić 22; Rebs: Calathes 13; Asts: Calathes 7 PIR: Mirotić 24	Boxscore	Pts: Sloukas 14; Rebs: Fall 8 Asts: four players 2 PIR: Vezenkov 14	Arena: Palau Blaugrana; Attendance: 3,086; Referees: Mehdi Difallah, Carmelo Paternicò, Gytis Vilius

=== Round 4 ===
14 October 2021	Zenit Saint Petersburg (Russia)	79–71	(Germany) Bayern Munich	Saint Petersburg
19:00 (CET)	Scoring by quarter: 31–16, 12–19, 11–25, 25–11
	Pts: Mickey 18; Rebs: Ponitka 7 Asts: Loyd 11; PIR: Poythress 20	Boxscore	Pts: Hilliard 24; Rebs: Šiško, Thomas 4 Asts: Walden 7 PIR: Walden 24	Arena: Sibur Arena; Attendance: 1,682; Referees: Miguel Ángel Pérez, Matej Boltauzer, Marko Juras

14 October 2021	Fenerbahçe Beko (Turkey)	80–41	(Russia) UNICS	Istanbul
19:45 (CET)	Scoring by quarter: 21–8, 23–14, 17–5, 19–14
	Pts: Shayok 17; Rebs: Düverioğlu, Polonara 8 Asts: Shayok 5 PIR: Booker 22	Boxscore	Pts: Canaan 10; Rebs: J. Brown, Jekiri 6 Asts: L. Brown, Spissu 2 PIR: L. Brown, Jekiri 9	Arena: Ülker Sports and Event Hall; Attendance: 2,639; Referees: Saša Pukl, Benjamín Jiménez, Vassilis Pitsilkas

14 October 2021	ALBA Berlin (Germany)	76–80	(Spain) Bitci Baskonia	Berlin
20:00 (CET)	Scoring by quarter: 15–21, 14–31, 18–10, 29–18
	Pts: Sikma 19; Rebs: Sikma 8 Asts: Smith 5 PIR: Sikma 29	Boxscore	Pts: Fontecchio 17; Rebs: Nnoko, Sedekerskis 6 Asts: Granger 6 PIR: Fontecchio 18	Arena: Mercedes-Benz Arena; Attendance: 3,145; Referees: Michele Rossi, Uroš Nikolić, Sébastien Clivaz

14 October 2021	LDLC ASVEL (France)	85–93	(Israel) Maccabi Tel Aviv	Villeurbanne
20:00 (CET)	Scoring by quarter: 21–25, 21–24, 20–26, 23–18
	Pts: Okobo 23; Rebs: three players 4 Asts: Okobo 4 PIR: Okobo 21	Boxscore	Pts: Nunnally 25; Rebs: Lessort, Reynolds 5 Asts: Wilbekin 4 PIR: Nunnally 24	Arena: Astroballe; Attendance: 4,197; Referees: Daniel Hierrezuelo, Sérgio Silva, Gentian Cici

15 October 2021	CSKA Moscow (Russia)	78–76	(Serbia) Crvena zvezda mts	Moscow
19:00 (CET)	Scoring by quarter: 17–21, 25–21, 15–15, 21–19
	Pts: Clyburn 18; Rebs: Bolomboy, Voigtmann 5 Asts: Shved 5 PIR: Shved 25	Boxscore	Pts: Wolters 16; Rebs: Kuzmić 7 Asts: three players 3 PIR: Kuzmić 22	Arena: Megasport Arena; Attendance: 2,573; Referees: Robert Lottermoser, Amit Balak, Aare Halliko

15 October 2021	AS Monaco (France)	81–85(OT)	(Spain) Barcelona	Fontvieille
19:00 (CET)	Scoring by quarter: 22–12, 13–19, 19–25, 21–19, Overtime: 6–10
	Pts: James 16; Rebs: Thomas 9 Asts: Lee 5 PIR: Thomas 28	Boxscore	Pts: Davies 27; Rebs: Calathes 11; Asts: Calathes 5 PIR: Davies 38	Arena: Salle Gaston Médecin; Attendance: 3,914; Referees: Damir Javor, Elias Koromilas, Josip Radojković

15 October 2021	Olympiacos (Greece)	83–68	(Lithuania) Žalgiris	Piraeus
20:00 (CET)	Scoring by quarter: 12–23, 24–16, 27–10, 20–19
	Pts: Sloukas 17; Rebs: Printezis 7 Asts: Walkup 4 PIR: Sloukas 19	Boxscore	Pts: Mudiay 19; Rebs: Blaževič 8 Asts: Kalnietis 7 PIR: Mudiay 16	Arena: Peace and Friendship Stadium; Attendance: 6,835; Referees: Luigi Lamonica, Uroš Obrknežević, Seffi Shemmesh

15 October 2021	A|X Armani Exchange Milan (Italy)	75–71	(Turkey) Anadolu Efes	Assago
20:30 (CET)	Scoring by quarter: 16–21, 26–15, 21–13, 12–22
	Pts: Delaney 16; Rebs: Mitoglou 7 Asts: Delaney, Mitoglou 5 PIR: Hines, Mitoglou 15	Boxscore	Pts: Micić 17; Rebs: Larkin 9 Asts: Micić 5 PIR: Larkin 20	Arena: Mediolanum Forum; Attendance: 4,516; Referees: Borys Ryzhyk, Ilija Belošević, Leandro Lezcano

15 October 2021	Real Madrid (Spain)	88–65	(Greece) Panathinaikos OPAP	Madrid
21:00 (CET)	Scoring by quarter: 30–18, 12–12, 20–20, 26–15
	Pts: Tavares 17; Rebs: Tavares 9 Asts: Heurtel 7 PIR: Tavares 31	Boxscore	Pts: Macon 18; Rebs: Papagiannis 6 Asts: Perry 5 PIR: Perry 16	Arena: WiZink Center; Attendance: 4,326; Referees: Sreten Radović, Saša Pukl, Hugues Thépénier

=== Round 5 ===
21 October 2021	Anadolu Efes (Turkey)	71–68	(Russia) UNICS	Istanbul
19:00 (CET)	Scoring by quarter: 18–22, 14–15, 15–14, 24–17
	Pts: Beaubois, Bryant 14; Rebs: Moerman 9 Asts: Larkin 5 PIR: Moerman 21	Boxscore	Pts: L. Brown, Canaan 16; Rebs: Hezonja 7 Asts: Hezonja 5 PIR: L. Brown 23	Arena: Sinan Erdem Dome; Attendance: 4,792; Referees: Robert Lottermoser, Emilio Pérez, Marcin Kowalski

21 October 2021	Žalgiris (Lithuania)	73–75	(Germany) Bayern Munich	Kaunas
19:00 (CET)	Scoring by quarter: 24–13, 15–14, 16–25, 18–23
	Pts: Lekavičius 17; Rebs: Nebo 13; Asts: Kalnietis 6 PIR: Nebo 21	Boxscore	Pts: Lučić 17; Rebs: Rubit 7 Asts: Walden 5 PIR: Lučić 20	Arena: Žalgirio arena Attendance: 9,057; Referees: Ilija Belošević, Leandro Lezcano, Josip Radojković

21 October 2021	Maccabi Tel Aviv (Israel)	77–73	(Greece) Panathinaikos OPAP	Tel Aviv
20:05 (CET)	Scoring by quarter: 19–13, 14–10, 22–17, 22–33
	Pts: Nunnally 18; Rebs: Reynolds 9 Asts: Wilbekin, Reynolds 4 PIR: Nunnally 25	Boxscore	Pts: Macon 17; Rebs: Papagiannis 12; Asts: Nedović 4 PIR: Papapetrou 19	Arena: Menora Mivtachim Arena; Attendance: 9,883; Referees: Juan Carlos García, Saulius Račys, Carmelo Paternicò

21 October 2021	A|X Armani Exchange Milan (Italy)	73–72	(France) LDLC ASVEL	Assago
20:30 (CET)	Scoring by quarter: 14–17, 12–23, 25–11, 22–21
	Pts: Shields 15; Rebs: Hines 8 Asts: Shields 5 PIR: Melli 18	Boxscore	Pts: Okobo 25; Rebs: Kahudi 6 Asts: Okobo 3 PIR: Okobo 19	Arena: Mediolanum Forum; Attendance: 3,172; Referees: Benjamín Jiménez, Uroš Nikolić, Sašo Petek

21 October 2021	Real Madrid (Spain)	70–69	(Turkey) Fenerbahçe Beko	Madrid
21:00 (CET)	Scoring by quarter: 10–15, 25–26, 15–11, 20–17
	Pts: Causeur 16; Rebs: Poirier 17; Asts: Fernández 3 PIR: Poirier, Causeur 15	Boxscore	Pts: de Colo 11; Rebs: Polonara 5 Asts: de Colo 6 PIR: de Colo 18	Arena: WiZink Center; Attendance: 6,595; Referees: Damir Javor, Anne Panther, Milan Nedović

22 October 2021	CSKA Moscow (Russia)	88–82	(Greece) Olympiacos	Moscow
19:00 (CET)	Scoring by quarter: 20–25, 28–13, 18–21, 22–23
	Pts: Clyburn 29; Rebs: Bolomboy 5 Asts: Clyburn 4 PIR: Clyburn 32	Boxscore	Pts: Dorsey 32; Rebs: Jean-Charles 6 Asts: Walkup 6 PIR: Dorsey 34	Arena: Megasport Arena; Attendance: 3,018; Referees: Daniel Hierrezuelo, Tomislav Hordov, Jakub Zamojski

22 October 2021	Crvena zvezda mts (Serbia)	63–78	(Germany) ALBA Berlin	Belgrade
19:00 (CET)	Scoring by quarter: 10–12, 15–26, 21–20, 17–20
	Pts: Kuzmić 16; Rebs: Mitrović 9 Asts: Wolters 5 PIR: Kuzmić 22	Boxscore	Pts: Lô 17; Rebs: Sikma 7 Asts: three players 3 PIR: Lô, Blatt 19	Arena: Aleksandar Nikolić Hall; Attendance: 4,658; Referees: Miguel Ángel Pérez, Rain Peerandi, Sérgio Silva

22 October 2021	Bitci Baskonia (Spain)	78–66	(France) AS Monaco	Vitoria-Gasteiz
20:30 (CET)	Scoring by quarter: 21–20, 17–15, 22–11, 18–20
	Pts: Fontecchio 20; Rebs: Sedekerskis 11; Asts: Granger 6 PIR: Fontecchio 30	Boxscore	Pts: James 18; Rebs: Boutsiele 10; Asts: Westermann 6 PIR: Boutsiele 18	Arena: Buesa Arena; Attendance: 7,423; Referees: Matej Boltauzer, Milivoje Jovčić, Robert Vyklický

22 October 2021	Barcelona (Spain)	84–58	(Russia) Zenit Saint Petersburg	Barcelona
21:00 (CET)	Scoring by quarter: 20–19, 24–8, 22–14, 18–17
	Pts: Mirotić 20; Rebs: Jokubaitis 5 Asts: Calathes 4 PIR: Mirotić 28	Boxscore	Pts: four players 8 Rebs: Ponitka 6 Asts: Kulagin, Loyd 2 PIR: Ponitka 11	Arena: Palau Blaugrana; Attendance: 4,481; Referees: Luigi Lamonica, Emin Moğulkoç, Mario Majkić

=== Round 6 ===
26 October 2021	AS Monaco (France)	70–62	(Serbia) Crvena zvezda mts	Fontvieille
19:00 (CET)	Scoring by quarter: 21–12, 20–24, 15–17, 14–9
	Pts: Diallo 19; Rebs: Motiejūnas 8 Asts: James 4 PIR: Diallo 28	Boxscore	Pts: Wolters 18; Rebs: Kuzmić 7 Asts: Wolters 5 PIR: Kalinić 19	Arena: Salle Gaston Médecin; Attendance: 3,119; Referees: Saša Pukl, Emilio Pérez, Michele Rossi

26 October 2021	Fenerbahçe Beko (Turkey)	74–76	(Spain) Barcelona	Istanbul
19:45 (CET)	Scoring by quarter: 20–15, 9–20, 19–14, 26–27
	Pts: Veselý 24; Rebs: Veselý 8 Asts: Henry 6 PIR: Veselý 29	Boxscore	Pts: Higgins 18; Rebs: Šmits 8 Asts: Calathes 7 PIR: Davies 20	Arena: Ülker Sports and Event Hall; Attendance: 5,132; Referees: Robert Lottermoser, Tomislav Hordov, Sašo Petek

26 October 2021	Olympiacos (Greece)	87–83	(Germany) ALBA Berlin	Piraeus
20:00 (CET)	Scoring by quarter: 27–19, 25–23, 19–17, 16–24
	Pts: Dorsey 13; Rebs: Walkup 5 Asts: Sloukas 6 PIR: Dorsey 17	Boxscore	Pts: da Silva 17; Rebs: Sikma 10; Asts: Sikma 8 PIR: Sikma 22	Arena: Peace and Friendship Stadium; Attendance: 6,756; Referees: Matej Boltauzer, Tomasz Trawicki, Josip Radojković

26 October 2021	Maccabi Tel Aviv (Israel)	76–62	(Lithuania) Žalgiris	Tel Aviv
20:05 (CET)	Scoring by quarter: 16–20, 23–10, 19–16, 18–16
	Pts: Williams 17; Rebs: Žižić 9 Asts: Wilbekin 6 PIR: Williams 23	Boxscore	Pts: Milaknis 17; Rebs: Nebo 9 Asts: Lekavičius, Mudiay 5 PIR: Nebo 16	Arena: Menora Mivtachim Arena; Attendance: 9,745; Referees: Damir Javor, Jordi Aliaga, Kristaps Konstantinovs

26 October 2021	Bayern Munich (Germany)	83–77	(Italy) A|X Armani Exchange Milan	Munich
20:45 (CET)	Scoring by quarter: 21–24, 18–15, 20–15, 24–23
	Pts: Lučić 20; Rebs: Hunter 10; Asts: Walden, Lučić 3 PIR: Hunter 20	Boxscore	Pts: Melli 16; Rebs: Melli, Mitoglou 8 Asts: Hall 6 PIR: Mitoglou 22	Arena: Audi Dome; Attendance: 3,677; Referees: Sreten Radović, Juan Carlos García, Saulius Račys

27 October 2021	UNICS (Russia)	83–69	(Spain) Bitci Baskonia	Kazan
18:00 (CET)	Scoring by quarter: 24–17, 24–6, 18–21, 17–25
	Pts: J. Brown, Vorontsevich 14; Rebs: Jekiri, Vorontsevich 7 Asts: Spissu 8 PIR: Vorontsevich 21	Boxscore	Pts: Baldwin 23; Rebs: Sedekerskis 12; Asts: Sedekerskis, Fontecchio 3 PIR: Costello 24	Arena: Basket-Hall Kazan; Attendance: 1,023; Referees: Ilija Belošević, Jakub Zamojski, Miloš Koljenšić

27 October 2021	Zenit Saint Petersburg (Russia)	68–75	(Spain) Real Madrid	Saint Petersburg
19:00 (CET)	Scoring by quarter: 13–22, 27–17, 17–20, 11–16
	Pts: Baron 14; Rebs: Gudaitis 5 Asts: Loyd 5 PIR: three players 3	Boxscore	Pts: Heurtel 15; Rebs: three players 4 Asts: Heurtel 6 PIR: Heurtel 22	Arena: Yubileyny Sports Palace; Attendance: 1,911; Referees: Milivoje Jovčić, Carmelo Paternicò, Elias Koromilas

27 October 2021	LDLC ASVEL (France)	70–68	(Russia) CSKA Moscow	Villeurbanne
20:00 (CET)	Scoring by quarter: 26–13, 13–17, 14–26, 17–12
	Pts: Okobo 14; Rebs: Fall 10; Asts: Jones, Okobo 3 PIR: Fall 19	Boxscore	Pts: Hackett 16; Rebs: Clyburn 9 Asts: Shved 5 PIR: Hackett 15	Arena: Astroballe; Attendance: 5,560; Referees: Anne Panther, Emin Moğulkoç, Mario Majkić

27 October 2021	Panathinaikos OPAP (Greece)	95–69	(Turkey) Anadolu Efes	Athens
21:00 (CET)	Scoring by quarter: 22–13, 30–22, 26–20, 17–14
	Pts: Macon 34; Rebs: Papagiannis 10; Asts: Perry 6 PIR: Macon 38	Boxscore	Pts: Beaubois 16; Rebs: Moerman 7 Asts: Simon 9 PIR: Beaubois, Bryant 12	Arena: OAKA Altion; Attendance: 6,198; Referees: Oļegs Latiševs, Benjamín Jiménez, Luka Kardum

=== Round 7 ===
28 October 2021	ALBA Berlin (Germany)	69–82	(Germany) Bayern Munich	Berlin
20:00 (CET)	Scoring by quarter: 18–19, 18–18, 19–20, 14–25
	Pts: Lô 23; Rebs: Olinde 9 Asts: Sikma 4 PIR: Lô 25	Boxscore	Pts: Hilliard 25; Rebs: Hunter 8 Asts: Hilliard 3 PIR: Hilliard 29	Arena: Mercedes-Benz Arena; Attendance: 4,658; Referees: Saša Pukl, Carlos Cortés, Jurgis Laurinavičius

28 October 2021	Olympiacos (Greece)	67–65	(Turkey) Fenerbahçe Beko	Piraeus
20:00 (CET)	Scoring by quarter: 19–14, 26–20, 10–19, 12–12
	Pts: Sloukas 14; Rebs: Fall 9 Asts: Sloukas 5 PIR: Fall 21	Boxscore	Pts: Veselý 14; Rebs: Veselý 9 Asts: Gudurić 4 PIR: Veselý 16	Arena: Peace and Friendship Stadium; Attendance: 9,459; Referees: Oļegs Latiševs, Gytis Vilius, Rain Peerandi

28 October 2021	Maccabi Tel Aviv (Israel)	85–68	(Spain) Barcelona	Tel Aviv
20:05 (CET)	Scoring by quarter: 31–18, 25–18, 9–18, 20–14
	Pts: Nunnally 17; Rebs: Caloiaro 5 Asts: Wilbekin 5 PIR: Nunnally 21	Boxscore	Pts: Higgins 20; Rebs: Davies 7 Asts: Calathes 6 PIR: Higgins 26	Arena: Menora Mivtachim Arena; Attendance: 10,005; Referees: Matej Boltauzer, Sreten Radović, Fernando Rocha

28 October 2021	A|X Armani Exchange Milan (Italy)	79–62	(Serbia) Crvena zvezda mts	Assago
20:30 (CET)	Scoring by quarter: 24–6, 19–21, 19–23, 17–12
	Pts: Shields 18; Rebs: Hines 9 Asts: Rodríguez 8 PIR: Shields 16	Boxscore	Pts: Mitrović 17; Rebs: Mitrović 7 Asts: Uskoković, Wolters 5 PIR: Mitrović 27	Arena: Mediolanum Forum; Attendance: 3,384; Referees: Damir Javor, Mehdi Difallah, Vassilis Pitsilkas

29 October 2021	UNICS (Russia)	65–58	(Spain) Real Madrid	Kazan
18:00 (CET)	Scoring by quarter: 14–11, 21–23, 14–17, 16–7
	Pts: Hezonja, Vorontsevich 13; Rebs: Jekiri 10; Asts: Spissu 9 PIR: J. Brown 14	Boxscore	Pts: Tavares 15; Rebs: Poirier 8 Asts: Heurtel 6 PIR: Tavares 28	Arena: Basket-Hall Kazan; Attendance: 2,741; Referees: Luigi Lamonica, Joseph Bissang, Seffi Shemmesh

29 October 2021	Zenit Saint Petersburg (Russia)	83–54	(Spain) Bitci Baskonia	Saint Petersburg
19:00 (CET)	Scoring by quarter: 21–23, 24–7, 20–7, 18–17
	Pts: Loyd 20; Rebs: Poythress 9 Asts: Ponitka 5 PIR: Loyd 25	Boxscore	Pts: Granger 13; Rebs: Costello 5 Asts: Fontecchio 4 PIR: Granger 11	Arena: Yubileyny Sports Palace; Attendance: 1,487; Referees: Robert Lottermoser, Tomislav Hordov, Uroš Obrknežević

29 October 2021	Anadolu Efes (Turkey)	94–60	(Lithuania) Žalgiris	Istanbul
19:30 (CET)	Scoring by quarter: 24–17, 20–12, 25–17, 25–14
	Pts: Pleiß 17; Rebs: three players 7 Asts: four players 4 PIR: Pleiß 22	Boxscore	Pts: Milaknis, Lekavičius 14; Rebs: three players 4 Asts: Kalnietis 5 PIR: Milaknis 12	Arena: Sinan Erdem Dome; Attendance: 5,218; Referees: Daniel Hierrezuelo, Milivoje Jovčić, Elias Koromilas

29 October 2021	AS Monaco (France)	97–80	(Russia) CSKA Moscow	Fontvieille
20:00 (CET)	Scoring by quarter: 13–25, 26–27, 28–12, 30–16
	Pts: Hall 17; Rebs: Hall 10; Asts: James 8 PIR: Hall 26	Boxscore	Pts: Clyburn 19; Rebs: Voigtmann 7 Asts: Shved 5 PIR: Clyburn 18	Arena: Salle Gaston Médecin; Attendance: 3,976; Referees: Miguel Ángel Pérez, Leandro Lezcano, Gentian Cici

29 October 2021	Panathinaikos OPAP (Greece)	70–84	(France) LDLC ASVEL	Athens
20:00 (CET)	Scoring by quarter: 18–24, 20–19, 16–15, 16–26
	Pts: Macon, Papapetrou 16; Rebs: Evans, Papapetrou 6 Asts: Nedović 3 PIR: Evans 19	Boxscore	Pts: Okobo 35; Rebs: Antetokounmpo 6 Asts: Jones, Strazel 3 PIR: Okobo 37	Arena: OAKA Altion; Attendance: 6,151; Referees: Borys Ryzhyk, Tomasz Trawicki, Robert Vyklický

=== Round 8 ===
4 November 2021	CSKA Moscow (Russia)	82–91	(Turkey) Fenerbahçe Beko	Moscow
18:00 (CET)	Scoring by quarter: 21–25, 23–24, 18–20, 20–22
	Pts: Clyburn 26; Rebs: Clyburn 9 Asts: Hackett 5 PIR: Clyburn 34	Boxscore	Pts: de Colo 18; Rebs: Veselý 7 Asts: Booker 5 PIR: Veselý 23	Arena: Megasport Arena; Attendance: 3,031; Referees: Borys Ryzhyk, Saulius Račys, Uroš Nikolić

4 November 2021	Crvena zvezda mts (Serbia)	81–48	(Greece) Panathinaikos OPAP	Belgrade
18:00 (CET)	Scoring by quarter: 21–8, 18–18, 18–10, 24–12
	Pts: Wolters 18; Rebs: Kuzmić 8 Asts: three players 3 PIR: Kuzmić 18	Boxscore	Pts: Macon 15; Rebs: four players 3 Asts: Papapetrou 3 PIR: Macon 13	Arena: Aleksandar Nikolić Hall; Attendance: 6,753; Referees: Luigi Lamonica, Leandro Lezcano, Jordi Aliaga

4 November 2021	LDLC ASVEL (France)	85–82	(Russia) UNICS	Villeurbanne
20:00 (CET)	Scoring by quarter: 21–24, 18–12, 26–21, 20–25
	Pts: Jones 25; Rebs: Okobo 6 Asts: Jones 3 PIR: Jones 27	Boxscore	Pts: Hezonja 27; Rebs: three players 6 Asts: L. Brown 7 PIR: Hezonja 29	Arena: Astroballe; Attendance: 4,770; Referees: Matej Boltauzer, Carlos Peruga, Sérgio Silva

4 November 2021	A|X Armani Exchange Milan (Italy)	75–70	(Spain) Barcelona	Assago
20:30 (CET)	Scoring by quarter: 28–21, 14–13, 19–15, 14–21
	Pts: Datome 17; Rebs: Melli 8 Asts: Shields 6 PIR: Datome 16	Boxscore	Pts: Davies 12; Rebs: Calathes 7 Asts: Calathes 5 PIR: Calathes, Davies 14	Arena: Mediolanum Forum; Attendance: 7,324; Referees: Ilija Belošević, Milan Nedović, Tomasz Trawicki

5 November 2021	Anadolu Efes (Turkey)	79–90	(Russia) Zenit Saint Petersburg	Istanbul
18:30 (CET)	Scoring by quarter: 20–22, 13–25, 18–26, 28–17
	Pts: Larkin 14; Rebs: three players 5 Asts: Larkin 5 PIR: Larkin 20	Boxscore	Pts: Frankamp 18; Rebs: Kuzminskas, Mickey 5 Asts: Baron 5 PIR: Kuzminskas 22	Arena: Sinan Erdem Dome; Attendance: 6,538; Referees: Sreten Radović, Joseph Bissang, Kristaps Konstantinovs

5 November 2021	Žalgiris (Lithuania)	71–79	(Germany) ALBA Berlin	Kaunas
19:00 (CET)	Scoring by quarter: 10–22, 27–19, 15–21, 19–17
	Pts: Cavanaugh 17; Rebs: Nebo, Cavanaugh 6 Asts: Lekavičius, Strēlnieks 4 PIR: Cavanaugh 14	Boxscore	Pts: Eriksson 16; Rebs: Sikma 6 Asts: Blatt, Lô 6 PIR: Sikma 23	Arena: Žalgirio arena Attendance: 8,170; Referees: Mehdi Difallah, Emin Moğulkoç, Sébastien Clivaz

5 November 2021	Olympiacos (Greece)	86–65	(France) AS Monaco	Piraeus
20:00 (CET)	Scoring by quarter: 17–27, 18–11, 24–14, 27–13
	Pts: Dorsey, Jean-Charles 18; Rebs: Vezenkov 10; Asts: Sloukas 6 PIR: Dorsey 23	Boxscore	Pts: Diallo 12; Rebs: Hall 9 Asts: James 8 PIR: Hall 15	Arena: Peace and Friendship Stadium; Attendance: 6,845; Referees: Robert Lottermoser, Piotr Pastusiak, Guido Giovannetti

5 November 2021	Bitci Baskonia (Spain)	69–87	(Israel) Maccabi Tel Aviv	Vitoria-Gasteiz
20:30 (CET)	Scoring by quarter: 14–21, 21–23, 19–19, 15–24
	Pts: Baldwin 15; Rebs: Fontecchio 7 Asts: Baldwin 5 PIR: Baldwin 18	Boxscore	Pts: Williams 21; Rebs: Williams 7 Asts: Evans 8 PIR: Evans 22	Arena: Buesa Arena; Attendance: 7,284; Referees: Saša Pukl, Oļegs Latiševs, Gytis Vilius

5 November 2021	Bayern Munich (Germany)	76–80	(Spain) Real Madrid	Munich
20:45 (CET)	Scoring by quarter: 13–13, 19–30, 26–17, 18–20
	Pts: Rubit 20; Rebs: Hunter 6 Asts: Rubit 5 PIR: Rubit 21	Boxscore	Pts: Yabusele 21; Rebs: Tavares 9 Asts: Heurtel, Llull 3 PIR: Yabusele 23	Arena: Audi Dome; Attendance: 4,982; Referees: Borys Ryzhyk, Mario Majkić, Robert Vyklický

=== Round 9 ===
11 November 2021	CSKA Moscow (Russia)	74–73	(Israel) Maccabi Tel Aviv	Moscow
18:00 (CET)	Scoring by quarter: 17–19, 22–19, 19–21, 16–14
	Pts: Lundberg 14; Rebs: Bolomboy 6 Asts: Shved 6 PIR: Bolomboy, Lundberg 14	Boxscore	Pts: Williams 20; Rebs: Žižić 6 Asts: Evans 4 PIR: Žižić 26	Arena: Megasport Arena; Attendance: 2,703; Referees: Luigi Lamonica, Emilio Pérez, Tomasz Trawicki

11 November 2021	Crvena zvezda mts (Serbia)	73–67	(France) LDLC ASVEL	Belgrade
19:00 (CET)	Scoring by quarter: 18–9, 15–23, 17–13, 23–22
	Pts: Kalinić 22; Rebs: Kuzmić 9 Asts: Ivanović 5 PIR: Kalinić 27	Boxscore	Pts: Okobo 16; Rebs: Fall 10; Asts: Strazel 5 PIR: Jones 17	Arena: Aleksandar Nikolić Hall; Attendance: 7,187; Referees: Juan Carlos García, Oļegs Latiševs, Eduard Udyanskyy

11 November 2021	ALBA Berlin (Germany)	63–90	(Turkey) Anadolu Efes	Berlin
20:00 (CET)	Scoring by quarter: 21–20, 14–31, 12–19, 16–20
	Pts: da Silva 13; Rebs: Eriksson, Sikma 4 Asts: Blatt, Lô 5 PIR: da Silva 15	Boxscore	Pts: Micić 19; Rebs: Pleiß 8 Asts: Micić 9 PIR: Micić 28	Arena: Mercedes-Benz Arena; Attendance: 5,266; Referees: Ilija Belošević, Carmelo Paternicò, Igor Dragojević

11 November 2021	Panathinaikos OPAP (Greece)	72–74	(Russia) UNICS	Athens
20:00 (CET)	Scoring by quarter: 15–15, 21–20, 18–19, 18–20
	Pts: Macon, Papagiannis 14; Rebs: Papagiannis 17; Asts: Bochoridis, Macon 3 PIR: Papagiannis 24	Boxscore	Pts: Canaan, Vorontsevich 15; Rebs: Jekiri 9 Asts: Canaan 5 PIR: L. Brown 16	Arena: OAKA Altion; Attendance: 4,521; Referees: Miguel Ángel Pérez, Anne Panther, Uroš Obrknežević

11 November 2021	Barcelona (Spain)	93–67	(Spain) Bitci Baskonia	Barcelona
21:00 (CET)	Scoring by quarter: 32–15, 23–16, 26–10, 12–26
	Pts: Mirotić 25; Rebs: Mirotić 8 Asts: Calathes 7 PIR: Mirotić 37	Boxscore	Pts: Enoch 22; Rebs: Enoch 8 Asts: L. Peters 5 PIR: Enoch 35	Arena: Palau Blaugrana; Attendance: 4,398; Referees: Damir Javor, Mehdi Difallah, Uroš Nikolić

12 November 2021	Zenit Saint Petersburg (Russia)	84–78	(Greece) Olympiacos	Saint Petersburg
18:00 (CET)	Scoring by quarter: 25–22, 24–21, 9–14, 26–21
	Pts: Frankamp 16; Rebs: three players 5 Asts: Baron 4 PIR: Kuzminskas, Ponitka 13	Boxscore	Pts: Walkup 17; Rebs: Fall 6 Asts: Dorsey, Sloukas 3 PIR: Fall, Sloukas 19	Arena: Sibur Arena; Attendance: 1,929; Referees: Luigi Lamonica, Miloš Koljenšić, Sinan Isguder

12 November 2021	Fenerbahçe Beko (Turkey)	43–68	(Italy) A|X Armani Exchange Milan	Istanbul
18:45 (CET)	Scoring by quarter: 3–22, 17–15, 9–25, 14–6
	Pts: Henry 12; Rebs: Veselý 6 Asts: de Colo, Pierre 3 PIR: Veselý 21	Boxscore	Pts: Shields 13; Rebs: four players 6 Asts: Rodríguez 7 PIR: Shields, Melli 17	Arena: Ülker Sports and Event Hall; Attendance: 8,601; Referees: Saša Pukl, Fernando Rocha, Jakub Zamojski

12 November 2021	AS Monaco (France)	94–71	(Germany) Bayern Munich	Fontvieille
20:00 (CET)	Scoring by quarter: 27–20, 28–23, 17–17, 22–11
	Pts: James 18; Rebs: Hall 8 Asts: Lee 5 PIR: James 18	Boxscore	Pts: Lučić 15; Rebs: Hilliard, Thomas 5 Asts: Walden 3 PIR: Lučić 23	Arena: Salle Gaston Médecin; Attendance: 3,813; Referees: Matej Boltauzer, Jordi Aliaga, Ioannis Foufis

12 November 2021	Real Madrid (Spain)	95–82	(Lithuania) Žalgiris	Madrid
20:45 (CET)	Scoring by quarter: 20–11, 31–34, 24–25, 20–12
	Pts: Yabusele 15; Rebs: Tavares, Yabusele 6 Asts: Heurtel 5 PIR: Poirier 23	Boxscore	Pts: Cavanaugh 14; Rebs: three players 4 Asts: Lekavičius 10; PIR: Lekavičius 17	Arena: WiZink Center; Attendance: 6,798; Referees: Robert Lottermoser, Michele Rossi, Sérgio Silva

=== Round 10 ===
16 November 2021	Žalgiris (Lithuania)	76–69	(Greece) Panathinaikos OPAP	Kaunas
19:00 (CET)	Scoring by quarter: 20–12, 23–25, 17–15, 16–17
	Pts: Milaknis 13; Rebs: Cavanaugh 9 Asts: Kalnietis 5 PIR: Ulanovas 23	Boxscore	Pts: Macon 21; Rebs: three players 6 Asts: three players 3 PIR: Macon 23	Arena: Žalgirio arena Attendance: 6,383; Referees: Sreten Radović, Emilio Pérez, Eduard Udyanskyy

16 November 2021	LDLC ASVEL (France)	74–87	(Spain) Real Madrid	Villeurbanne
20:00 (CET)	Scoring by quarter: 24–33, 19–18, 11–16, 20–20
	Pts: Okobo 26; Rebs: Jones 6 Asts: Okobo 6 PIR: Okobo 26	Boxscore	Pts: Causeur 25; Rebs: Tavares 10; Asts: Hanga 6 PIR: Tavares 25	Arena: Astroballe; Attendance: 5,116; Referees: Saša Pukl, Fernando Rocha, Uroš Nikolić

16 November 2021	Bitci Baskonia (Spain)	93–74	(Serbia) Crvena zvezda mts	Vitoria-Gasteiz
20:30 (CET)	Scoring by quarter: 25–22, 30–10, 13–21, 25–21
	Pts: Enoch 23; Rebs: Enoch 11; Asts: L. Peters, Fontecchio 7 PIR: Enoch 32	Boxscore	Pts: Ivanović 21; Rebs: Kuzmić 8 Asts: Ivanović 7 PIR: Ivanović 27	Arena: Buesa Arena; Attendance: 6,091; Referees: Matej Boltauzer, Emin Moğulkoç, Amit Balak

16 November 2021	Bayern Munich (Germany)	71–63	(Turkey) Fenerbahçe Beko	Munich
20:30 (CET)	Scoring by quarter: 22–12, 13–18, 14–16, 22–17
	Pts: Lučić 22; Rebs: Lučić 7 Asts: Lučić 3 PIR: Lučić 28	Boxscore	Pts: Gudurić 16; Rebs: Veselý 7 Asts: Veselý 3 PIR: Veselý 23	Arena: Audi Dome; Attendance: 3,733; Referees: Daniel Hierrezuelo, Mehdi Difallah, Tomislav Hordov

17 November 2021	Zenit Saint Petersburg (Russia)	75–66	(Germany) ALBA Berlin	Saint Petersburg
17:00 (CET)	Scoring by quarter: 20–14, 22–16, 17–20, 16–16
	Pts: Loyd 25; Rebs: Gudaitis, Mickey 7 Asts: three players 3 PIR: Loyd 33	Boxscore	Pts: Eriksson 20; Rebs: Sikma 8 Asts: Sikma, Blatt 3 PIR: Eriksson 19	Arena: Sibur Arena; Attendance: 1,416; Referees: Damir Javor, Gytis Vilius, Jakub Zamojski

17 November 2021	UNICS (Russia)	97–71	(Italy) A|X Armani Exchange Milan	Kazan
18:00 (CET)	Scoring by quarter: 19–17, 25–16, 27–16, 26–22
	Pts: Canaan 22; Rebs: Jekiri 7 Asts: Spissu 6 PIR: J. Brown 27	Boxscore	Pts: three players 10; Rebs: Melli 3 Asts: Ricci, Rodríguez 3 PIR: Melli 18	Arena: Basket-Hall Kazan; Attendance: 2,021; Referees: Borys Ryzhyk, Milivoje Jovčić, Miloš Koljenšić

17 November 2021	Anadolu Efes (Turkey)	88–69	(Greece) Olympiacos	Istanbul
18:30 (CET)	Scoring by quarter: 23–25, 21–19, 24–22, 20–3
	Pts: Beaubois 29; Rebs: Moerman 8 Asts: Larkin 6 PIR: Beaubois 33	Boxscore	Pts: Vezenkov 17; Rebs: Vezenkov 8 Asts: Sloukas 4 PIR: Vezenkov 26	Arena: Sinan Erdem Dome; Attendance: 9,377; Referees: Juan Carlos García, Milan Nedović, Uroš Obrknežević

17 November 2021	Maccabi Tel Aviv (Israel)	95–84	(France) AS Monaco	Tel Aviv
20:05 (CET)	Scoring by quarter: 26–19, 15–25, 21–17, 33–23
	Pts: Wilbekin 37; Rebs: Žižić 11; Asts: Wilbekin 8 PIR: Wilbekin 37	Boxscore	Pts: Hall 18; Rebs: Hall 9 Asts: James 6 PIR: Hall 29	Arena: Menora Mivtachim Arena; Attendance: 10,299; Referees: Ilija Belošević, Carlos Cortés, Rain Peerandi

17 November 2021	Barcelona (Spain)	81–73	(Russia) CSKA Moscow	Barcelona
21:00 (CET)	Scoring by quarter: 13–13, 25–14, 13–33, 30–13
	Pts: Mirotić 21; Rebs: Mirotić 8 Asts: Calathes 7 PIR: Mirotić 27	Boxscore	Pts: Voigtmann 21; Rebs: Voigtmann, Shengelia 6 Asts: Shved 4 PIR: Shengelia 24	Arena: Palau Blaugrana; Attendance: 5,028; Referees: Robert Lottermoser, Oļegs Latiševs, Sašo Petek

=== Round 11 ===
18 November 2021	Bayern Munich (Germany)	81–78	(Greece) Panathinaikos OPAP	Munich
20:30 (CET)	Scoring by quarter: 22–22, 15–22, 22–16, 22–18
	Pts: Hilliard 20; Rebs: Weiler-Babb 7 Asts: Walden 5 PIR: Hilliard 20	Boxscore	Pts: Papapetrou 17; Rebs: Papagiannis 5 Asts: Macon 6 PIR: Macon 18	Arena: Audi Dome; Attendance: 2,114; Referees: Benjamin Jiménez, Fernando Rocha, Michele Rossi

18 November 2021	Real Madrid (Spain)	79–67	(Serbia) Crvena zvezda mts	Madrid
20:45 (CET)	Scoring by quarter: 16–13, 16–19, 25–14, 22–21
	Pts: Tavares 15; Rebs: Poirier 8 Asts: Fernández 6 PIR: Poirier, Tavares 23	Boxscore	Pts: Hollins 16; Rebs: Davidovac 9 Asts: Ivanović 5 PIR: Hollins 17	Arena: WiZink Center; Attendance: 5,825; Referees: Mehdi Difallah, Carmelo Paternicò, Elias Koromilas

19 November 2021	UNICS (Russia)	85–71	(Germany) ALBA Berlin	Kazan
17:00 (CET)	Scoring by quarter: 13–26, 27–22, 19–12, 26–11
	Pts: Hezonja 22; Rebs: Hezonja 7 Asts: L. Brown 9 PIR: L. Brown 31	Boxscore	Pts: Koumadje, Smith 12; Rebs: Koumadje 12; Asts: Blatt 4 PIR: Koumadje 21	Arena: Basket-Hall Kazan; Attendance: 1,624; Referees: Oļegs Latiševs, Joseph Bissang, Saulius Račys

19 November 2021	Anadolu Efes (Turkey)	98–77	(France) AS Monaco	Istanbul
18:15 (CET)	Scoring by quarter: 24–20, 34–20, 15–21, 25–16
	Pts: Beaubois 17; Rebs: Moerman 7 Asts: Beaubois 7 PIR: Beaubois 24	Boxscore	Pts: Motiejūnas 21; Rebs: three players 5 Asts: James 4 PIR: Motiejūnas 22	Arena: Sinan Erdem Dome; Attendance: 6,502; Referees: Saša Pukl, Emilio Pérez, Seffi Shemmesh

19 November 2021	Zenit Saint Petersburg (Russia)	74–70	(Italy) A|X Armani Exchange Milan	Saint Petersburg
18:45 (CET)	Scoring by quarter: 19–19, 16–20, 25–21, 14–10
	Pts: Mickey 17; Rebs: Ponitka 9 Asts: Loyd 7 PIR: Gudaitis 19	Boxscore	Pts: Rodríguez 20; Rebs: Hines 8 Asts: Rodríguez 6 PIR: Rodríguez 22	Arena: Sibur Arena; Attendance: 2,072; Referees: Robert Lottermoser, Juan Carlos García, Robert Vyklický

19 November 2021	Žalgiris (Lithuania)	86–75	(Turkey) Fenerbahçe Beko	Kaunas
19:45 (CET)	Scoring by quarter: 16–18, 22–11, 26–30, 22–16
	Pts: Ulanovas 18; Rebs: Nebo 7 Asts: Kalnietis 11; PIR: Ulanovas 21	Boxscore	Pts: de Colo 17; Rebs: Henry 5 Asts: de Colo 5 PIR: de Colo 26	Arena: Žalgirio arena Attendance: 10,067; Referees: Luigi Lamonica, Piotr Pastusiak, Gentian Cici

19 November 2021	Olympiacos (Greece)	90–73	(Israel) Maccabi Tel Aviv	Piraeus
20:00 (CET)	Scoring by quarter: 35–8, 16–18, 20–19, 19–28
	Pts: Sloukas 18; Rebs: Fall 11; Asts: Vezenkov 6 PIR: Sloukas 29	Boxscore	Pts: Nunnally 14; Rebs: Nunnally, Sorkin 8 Asts: Nunnally 5 PIR: Nunnally, Sorkin 14	Arena: Peace and Friendship Stadium; Attendance: 6,854; Referees: Daniel Hierrezuelo, Tomislav Hordov, Uroš Nikolić

19 November 2021	Bitci Baskonia (Spain)	74–80	(Russia) CSKA Moscow	Vitoria-Gasteiz
20:30 (CET)	Scoring by quarter: 8–23, 18–12, 15–19, 33–26
	Pts: Baldwin 18; Rebs: Enoch 10; Asts: L. Peters 4 PIR: Enoch 19	Boxscore	Pts: Voigtmann, Clyburn 16; Rebs: Shved, Bolomboy 5 Asts: Shved 6 PIR: Voigtmann, Clyburn 18	Arena: Buesa Arena; Attendance: 8,104; Referees: Ilija Belošević, Sreten Radović, Sérgio Silva

19 November 2021	LDLC ASVEL (France)	60–80	(Spain) Barcelona	Villeurbanne
21:00 (CET)	Scoring by quarter: 9–19, 19–12, 19–31, 13–18
	Pts: Okobo 17; Rebs: Howard, Jones 6 Asts: Jones 4 PIR: Jones 15	Boxscore	Pts: Laprovíttola 25; Rebs: Laprovíttola 7 Asts: Jokubaitis 5 PIR: Laprovíttola 28	Arena: Astroballe; Attendance: 5,461; Referees: Borys Ryzhyk, Milivoje Jovčić, Miloš Koljenšić

=== Round 12 ===
25 November 2021	CSKA Moscow (Russia)	77–74	(Germany) Bayern Munich	Moscow
18:00 (CET)	Scoring by quarter: 18–24, 14–17, 24–16, 21–17
	Pts: Clyburn 17; Rebs: Shengelia, Clyburn 5 Asts: Shengelia 4 PIR: Clyburn 22	Boxscore	Pts: Hilliard 28; Rebs: Hunter 6 Asts: Weiler-Babb 5 PIR: Hilliard 30	Arena: Megasport Arena; Attendance: 3,352; Referees: Saša Pukl, Carlos Peruga, Saulius Račys

25 November 2021	Fenerbahçe Beko (Turkey)	84–89	(Turkey) Anadolu Efes	Istanbul
18:45 (CET)	Scoring by quarter: 18–20, 23–16, 26–20, 17–33
	Pts: Shayok 18; Rebs: Polonara 8 Asts: de Colo 5 PIR: de Colo 19	Boxscore	Pts: Larkin 25; Rebs: Beaubois 5 Asts: Larkin 7 PIR: Larkin 29	Arena: Ülker Sports and Event Hall; Attendance: 6,286; Referees: Miguel Ángel Pérez, Sreten Radović, Sašo Petek

25 November 2021	Bitci Baskonia (Spain)	60–88	(Spain) Real Madrid	Vitoria-Gasteiz
20:30 (CET)	Scoring by quarter: 14–25, 20–28, 13–18, 13–17
	Pts: Enoch, Fontecchio 14; Rebs: Fontecchio 7 Asts: Granger 4 PIR: Fontecchio 16	Boxscore	Pts: Causeur 13; Rebs: Abalde 11; Asts: Heurtel 9 PIR: Heurtel 18	Arena: Buesa Arena; Attendance: 8,218; Referees: Oļegs Latiševs, Tomislav Hordov, Rain Peerandi

25 November 2021	ALBA Berlin (Germany)	91–86	(Israel) Maccabi Tel Aviv	Berlin
20:30 (CET)	Scoring by quarter: 21–17, 24–18, 20–23, 26–28
	Pts: Eriksson 19; Rebs: Lô, Koumadje 5 Asts: Blatt 5 PIR: Koumadje 18	Boxscore	Pts: Wilbekin 22; Rebs: Žižić 6 Asts: Wilbekin, Nunnally 5 PIR: Wilbekin 28	Arena: Mercedes-Benz Arena; Attendance: 4,099; Referees: Milan Nedović, Milivoje Jovčić, Hugues Thépénier

25 November 2021	Panathinaikos OPAP (Greece)	70–64	(Russia) Zenit Saint Petersburg	Athens
20:30 (CET)	Scoring by quarter: 15–23, 18–15, 20–10, 17–16
	Pts: Nedović, Papagiannis 18; Rebs: Papagiannis 13; Asts: Nedović 5 PIR: Papagiannis 31	Boxscore	Pts: Loyd 15; Rebs: Kuzminskas 8 Asts: Frankamp 4 PIR: Kuzminskas 14	Arena: OAKA Altion; Attendance: 5,200; Referees: Borys Ryzhyk, Mehdi Difallah, Uroš Nikolić

26 November 2021	Crvena zvezda mts (Serbia)	78–98	(Russia) UNICS	Belgrade
19:00 (CET)	Scoring by quarter: 16–26, 23–21, 18–29, 21–22
	Pts: Hollins 15; Rebs: Kuzmić 9 Asts: Wolters, Kalinić 4 PIR: Hollins 15	Boxscore	Pts: J. Brown 18; Rebs: three players 5 Asts: L. Brown 9 PIR: Hezonja 25	Arena: Aleksandar Nikolić Hall; Attendance: 5,286; Referees: Luigi Lamonica, Leandro Lezcano, Mario Majkić

26 November 2021	AS Monaco (France)	84–85	(France) LDLC ASVEL	Fontvieille
20:00 (CET)	Scoring by quarter: 21–22, 19–26, 22–14, 22–23
	Pts: Lee 20; Rebs: Thomas 7 Asts: James 4 PIR: Hall, Lee 20	Boxscore	Pts: Howard 23; Rebs: Howard 10; Asts: Jones 5 PIR: Howard 31	Arena: Salle Gaston Médecin; Attendance: 4,013; Referees: Gytis Vilius, Carmelo Paternicò, Robert Vyklický

26 November 2021	A|X Armani Exchange Milan (Italy)	72–93	(Greece) Olympiacos	Assago
20:30 (CET)	Scoring by quarter: 25–30, 20–30, 12–12, 15–21
	Pts: Shields 26; Rebs: Melli 6 Asts: Rodríguez, Shields 3 PIR: Shields 28	Boxscore	Pts: Larentzakis 18; Rebs: three players 5 Asts: Dorsey, Sloukas 4 PIR: Larentzakis 16	Arena: Mediolanum Forum; Attendance: 7,256; Referees: Ilija Belošević, Damir Javor, Tomasz Trawicki

26 November 2021	Barcelona (Spain)	96–73	(Lithuania) Žalgiris	Barcelona
21:00 (CET)	Scoring by quarter: 24–17, 28–21, 23–20, 21–15
	Pts: Jokubaitis 15; Rebs: Oriola 9 Asts: Laprovíttola 8 PIR: Oriola 25	Boxscore	Pts: Webster 13; Rebs: Ulanovas 6 Asts: Webster, Kalnietis 4 PIR: Webster 14	Arena: Palau Blaugrana; Attendance: 4,808; Referees: Matej Boltauzer, Fernando Rocha, Luka Kardum

=== Round 13 ===
2 December 2021	CSKA Moscow (Russia)	97–77	(Greece) Panathinaikos OPAP	Moscow
18:00 (CET)	Scoring by quarter: 31–22, 22–16, 22–16, 22–23
	Pts: Shved 17; Rebs: Milutinov 13; Asts: Shved 13; PIR: Clyburn, Shved 21	Boxscore	Pts: White 19; Rebs: Papagiannis 9 Asts: Macon 8 PIR: Papagiannis 20	Arena: Megasport Arena; Attendance: 2,756; Referees: Miguel Ángel Pérez, Milivoje Jovčić, Milan Nedović

2 December 2021	Fenerbahçe Beko (Turkey)	96–86	(France) AS Monaco	Istanbul
18:45 (CET)	Scoring by quarter: 16–18, 24–24, 23–21, 33–23
	Pts: Veselý 20; Rebs: Veselý 10; Asts: Henry 6 PIR: Veselý 32	Boxscore	Pts: James 31; Rebs: Ouattara 6 Asts: Lee 5 PIR: James 33	Arena: Ülker Sports and Event Hall; Attendance: 3,307; Referees: Matej Boltauzer, Juan Carlos García, Saulius Račys

2 December 2021	Žalgiris (Lithuania)	72–68	(Spain) Bitci Baskonia	Kaunas
19:00 (CET)	Scoring by quarter: 21–19, 19–13, 11–14, 21–22
	Pts: Lekavičius 13; Rebs: Cavanaugh 9 Asts: Lekavičius 9 PIR: Lekavičius 23	Boxscore	Pts: Enoch 13; Rebs: Enoch 10; Asts: Granger 6 PIR: Enoch 23	Arena: Žalgirio arena Attendance: 7,335; Referees: Borys Ryzhyk, Elias Koromilas, Igor Dragojević

2 December 2021	Real Madrid (Spain)	72–70	(Israel) Maccabi Tel Aviv	Madrid
20:45 (CET)	Scoring by quarter: 20–18, 17–20, 13–21, 22–11
	Pts: Heurtel, Yabusele 15; Rebs: Tavares 8 Asts: Heurtel 5 PIR: Tavares, Yabusele 17	Boxscore	Pts: Wilbekin 14; Rebs: Sorkin 5 Asts: Wilbekin 5 PIR: Žižić 13	Arena: WiZink Center; Attendance: 6,941; Referees: Robert Lottermoser, Gytis Vilius, Emin Moğulkoç

2 December 2021	Bayern Munich (Germany)	73–65	(France) LDLC ASVEL	Munich
20:45 (CET)	Scoring by quarter: 12–20, 27–18, 19–16, 15–11
	Pts: Rubit 19; Rebs: Rubit 12; Asts: Weiler-Babb 3 PIR: Rubit 24	Boxscore	Pts: Okobo 14; Rebs: Jones 6 Asts: Jones, Okobo 5 PIR: Jones 18	Arena: Audi Dome; Attendance: 481; Referees: Sreten Radović, Jurgis Laurinavičius, Jordi Aliaga

3 December 2021	UNICS (Russia)	84–87(OT)	(Greece) Olympiacos	Kazan
17:00 (CET)	Scoring by quarter: 20–17, 20–25, 22–17, 15–18, Overtime: 7–10
	Pts: L. Brown 21; Rebs: Jekiri 9 Asts: Hezonja, L. Brown 4 PIR: Jekiri, L. Brown 18	Boxscore	Pts: Vezenkov 22; Rebs: Vezenkov 7 Asts: Sloukas 8 PIR: Vezenkov 36	Arena: Basket-Hall Kazan; Attendance: 2,153; Referees: Anne Panther, Carlos Cortés, Rain Peerandi

3 December 2021	Anadolu Efes (Turkey)	93–95(OT)	(Spain) Barcelona	Istanbul
18:30 (CET)	Scoring by quarter: 25–20, 22–17, 21–25, 12–18, Overtime: 13–15
	Pts: Micić 26; Rebs: Moerman 6 Asts: Larkin 6 PIR: Micić 31	Boxscore	Pts: Şanlı 24; Rebs: Mirotić 8 Asts: Laprovíttola 8 PIR: Şanlı 25	Arena: Sinan Erdem Dome; Attendance: 15,008; Referees: Luigi Lamonica, Ilija Belošević, Mehdi Difallah

3 December 2021	Zenit Saint Petersburg (Russia)	58–69	(Serbia) Crvena zvezda mts	Saint Petersburg
19:00 (CET)	Scoring by quarter: 16–23, 12–19, 12–16, 18–11
	Pts: Mickey 16; Rebs: Zubkov 8 Asts: Loyd 5 PIR: Zubkov 23	Boxscore	Pts: Wolters 14; Rebs: three players 5 Asts: Kalinić 4 PIR: Wolters 14	Arena: Sibur Arena; Attendance: 2,467; Referees: Oļegs Latiševs, Piotr Pastusiak, Vassilis Pitsilkas

3 December 2021	ALBA Berlin (Germany)	81–76	(Italy) A|X Armani Exchange Milan	Berlin
20:00 (CET)	Scoring by quarter: 19–15, 24–18, 24–23, 14–20
	Pts: Eriksson 21; Rebs: Olinde 8 Asts: Sikma 7 PIR: Eriksson 24	Boxscore	Pts: Delaney 12; Rebs: Melli 7 Asts: Rodríguez 6 PIR: Rodríguez, Shields 15	Arena: Mercedes-Benz Arena; Attendance: 2,483; Referees: Saša Pukl, Fernando Rocha, Amit Balak

=== Round 14 ===
9 December 2021	Zenit Saint Petersburg (Russia)	80–86	(Turkey) Fenerbahçe Beko	Saint Petersburg
18:00 (CET)	Scoring by quarter: 18–16, 23–24, 21–21, 18–25
	Pts: Loyd 19; Rebs: Gudaitis 7 Asts: Frankamp 4 PIR: Loyd 19	Boxscore	Pts: Veselý 32; Rebs: Veselý 5 Asts: de Colo 8 PIR: Veselý 35	Arena: Sibur Arena; Attendance: 2,283; Referees: Saša Pukl, Fernando Rocha, Gytis Vilius

9 December 2021	Crvena zvezda mts (Serbia)	81–76	(Greece) Olympiacos	Belgrade
19:00 (CET)	Scoring by quarter: 19–15, 17–23, 20–15, 25–23
	Pts: Kalinić 25; Rebs: Mitrović 8 Asts: Kalinić 6 PIR: Kalinić 27	Boxscore	Pts: Dorsey 18; Rebs: Martin 6 Asts: Sloukas 4 PIR: Dorsey 17	Arena: Aleksandar Nikolić Hall; Attendance: 4,336; Referees: Juan Carlos García, Emin Moğulkoç, Hugues Thépénier

9 December 2021	Bayern Munich (Germany)	83–71	(Turkey) Anadolu Efes	Munich
19:45 (CET)	Scoring by quarter: 27–23, 17–15, 22–26, 17–7
	Pts: three players 18; Rebs: Lučić 12; Asts: Šiško 6 PIR: Lučić 29	Boxscore	Pts: Larkin, Beaubois 18; Rebs: Dunston, Moerman 5 Asts: Larkin 4 PIR: Dunston 19	Arena: Audi Dome; Attendance: 0 Referees: Daniel Hierrezuelo, Damir Javor, Joseph Bissang
Note: The match was played behind closed doors due to the COVID-19 pandemic in Germany.

9 December 2021	Maccabi Tel Aviv (Israel)	74–85	(Russia) UNICS	Tel Aviv
20:05 (CET)	Scoring by quarter: 24–26, 19–17, 23–20, 8–22
	Pts: Wilbekin 18; Rebs: four players 5 Asts: Wilbekin 4 PIR: Wilbekin 17	Boxscore	Pts: L. Brown 26; Rebs: Jekiri 9 Asts: L. Brown 6 PIR: L. Brown 30	Arena: Menora Mivtachim Arena; Attendance: 10,353; Referees: Ilija Belošević, Carmelo Paternicò, Robert Vyklický

9 December 2021	Bitci Baskonia (Spain)	91–66	(France) LDLC ASVEL	Vitoria-Gasteiz
20:30 (CET)	Scoring by quarter: 19–19, 26–25, 24–11, 22–11
	Pts: Fontecchio, Giedraitis 15; Rebs: Sedekerskis 7 Asts: Granger 8 PIR: Baldwin 19	Boxscore	Pts: Jones 17; Rebs: Lacombe 7 Asts: Okobo 5 PIR: Jones 21	Arena: Buesa Arena; Attendance: 5,426; Referees: Matej Boltauzer, Michele Rossi, Uroš Obrknežević

10 December 2021	Žalgiris (Lithuania)	51–73	(Russia) CSKA Moscow	Kaunas
19:00 (CET)	Scoring by quarter: 18–19, 10–11, 11–27, 12–16
	Pts: Nebo 11; Rebs: Nebo 7 Asts: Lekavičius 5 PIR: Nebo 21	Boxscore	Pts: Milutinov 19; Rebs: Milutinov 12; Asts: Shengelia 4 PIR: Milutinov 36	Arena: Žalgirio arena Attendance: 12,345; Referees: Robert Lottermoser, Emilio Pérez, Tomasz Trawicki

10 December 2021	AS Monaco (France)	65–71	(Italy) A|X Armani Exchange Milan	Fontvieille
20:00 (CET)	Scoring by quarter: 14–26, 13–13, 17–18, 21–14
	Pts: Lee 19; Rebs: Motiejūnas 9 Asts: Lee 6 PIR: Lee 26	Boxscore	Pts: Rodríguez 13; Rebs: three players 6 Asts: Rodríguez 4 PIR: Hines 20	Arena: Salle Gaston Médecin; Attendance: 4,009; Referees: Borys Ryzhyk, Oļegs Latiševs, Aare Halliko

10 December 2021	Panathinaikos OPAP (Greece)	82–67	(Germany) ALBA Berlin	Athens
20:00 (CET)	Scoring by quarter: 30–25, 13–18, 14–9, 25–15
	Pts: Macon 20; Rebs: Papagiannis 10; Asts: Macon 11; PIR: Papagiannis, Macon 24	Boxscore	Pts: Eriksson 18; Rebs: Olinde, Thiemann 6 Asts: Blatt 7 PIR: da Silva 17	Arena: OAKA Altion; Attendance: 4,744; Referees: Luigi Lamonica, Carlos Peruga, Josip Radojković

10 December 2021	Barcelona (Spain)	93–80	(Spain) Real Madrid	Barcelona
21:00 (CET)	Scoring by quarter: 24–19, 27–23, 16–16, 26–22
	Pts: Mirotić 31; Rebs: Mirotić 10; Asts: Laprovíttola, Jokubaitis 4 PIR: Mirotić 39	Boxscore	Pts: Heurtel, Causeur 11; Rebs: Tavares 6 Asts: Heurtel 4 PIR: Tavares 13	Arena: Palau Blaugrana; Attendance: 7,079; Referees: Sreten Radović, Sašo Petek, Uroš Nikolić

=== Round 15 ===
14 December 2021	Anadolu Efes (Turkey)	87–72	(Spain) Bitci Baskonia	Istanbul
18:30 (CET)	Scoring by quarter: 13–21, 30–21, 23–20, 21–10
	Pts: Micić 24; Rebs: Larkin 7 Asts: Larkin, Micić 4 PIR: Micić 31	Boxscore	Pts: Granger, Fontecchio 17; Rebs: Enoch 9 Asts: three players 3 PIR: Granger 17	Arena: Sinan Erdem Dome; Attendance: 9,617; Referees: Saša Pukl, Anne Panther, Marcin Kowalski

14 December 2021	Fenerbahçe Beko (Turkey)	90–79	(Israel) Maccabi Tel Aviv	Istanbul
18:45 (CET)	Scoring by quarter: 23–18, 19–19, 28–14, 20–28
	Pts: Booker 22; Rebs: Veselý, Booker 6 Asts: de Colo 5 PIR: de Colo 25	Boxscore	Pts: Nunnally 18; Rebs: Žižić 11; Asts: Evans 7 PIR: Evans, Nunnally 17	Arena: Ülker Sports and Event Hall; Attendance: 5,130; Referees: Luigi Lamonica, Oļegs Latiševs, Uroš Nikolić

14 December 2021	Crvena zvezda mts (Serbia)	69–76	(Spain) Barcelona	Belgrade
19:00 (CET)	Scoring by quarter: 13–20, 18–14, 18–27, 20–15
	Pts: Kalinić, Mitrović 15; Rebs: Kuzmić 14; Asts: Davidovac 2 PIR: Davidovac 15	Boxscore	Pts: Hayes 14; Rebs: Hayes 8 Asts: Jokubaitis, Laprovíttola 5 PIR: Hayes 23	Arena: Aleksandar Nikolić Hall; Attendance: 6,849; Referees: Carmelo Paternicò, Gytis Vilius, Elias Koromilas

14 December 2021	A|X Armani Exchange Milan (Italy)	75–54	(Greece) Panathinaikos OPAP	Assago
20:30 (CET)	Scoring by quarter: 15–19, 18–10, 24–13, 18–12
	Pts: Hall 19; Rebs: Delaney, Ricci 6 Asts: Rodríguez 9 PIR: Hall 19	Boxscore	Pts: Macon 14; Rebs: Papagiannis 7 Asts: Sant-Roos 3 PIR: White 10	Arena: Mediolanum Forum; Attendance: 3,456; Referees: Sreten Radović, Juan Carlos García, Saulius Račys

14 December 2021	Real Madrid (Spain)	87–64	(Germany) ALBA Berlin	Madrid
20:45 (CET)	Scoring by quarter: 19–16, 24–10, 17–20, 27–18
	Pts: Tavares 17; Rebs: Poirier 9 Asts: Williams-Goss 5 PIR: Tavares 25	Boxscore	Pts: Thiemann 11; Rebs: Lammers 6 Asts: Blatt 5 PIR: Thiemann 12	Arena: WiZink Center; Attendance: 5,010; Referees: Mehdi Difallah, Seffi Shemmesh, Ioannis Foufis

15 December 2021	CSKA Moscow (Russia)	67–88	(Russia) UNICS	Moscow
18:00 (CET)	Scoring by quarter: 21–27, 7–19, 23–26, 16–16
	Pts: Shengelia 20; Rebs: three players 6 Asts: Lundberg 3 PIR: Shengelia 27	Boxscore	Pts: Hezonja 18; Rebs: Hezonja 10; Asts: L. Brown 8 PIR: Hezonja 26	Arena: Megasport Arena; Attendance: 3,211; Referees: Daniel Hierrezuelo, Emin Moğulkoç, Joseph Bissang

15 December 2021	Žalgiris (Lithuania)	98–107(OT)	(France) AS Monaco	Kaunas
19:00 (CET)	Scoring by quarter: 21–22, 22–26, 27–13, 25–34, Overtime: 3–12
	Pts: Strēlnieks 22; Rebs: Cavanaugh, Nebo 9 Asts: Lekavičius 6 PIR: Strēlnieks 21	Boxscore	Pts: James 20; Rebs: Hall 8 Asts: James 14; PIR: James 31	Arena: Žalgirio arena Attendance: 7,472; Referees: Milivoje Jovčić, Leandro Lezcano, Michele Rossi

15 December 2021	Olympiacos (Greece)	83–60	(Germany) Bayern Munich	Piraeus
20:00 (CET)	Scoring by quarter: 26–10, 23–14, 16–13, 18–23
	Pts: Vezenkov 16; Rebs: Vezenkov 9 Asts: Walkup, Sloukas 3 PIR: Vezenkov 24	Boxscore	Pts: Rubit 10; Rebs: Rubit, Hunter 5 Asts: three players 2 PIR: Lučić, Hunter 10	Arena: Peace and Friendship Stadium; Attendance: 4,638; Referees: Matej Boltauzer, Emilio Pérez, Robert Vyklický

15 December 2021	LDLC ASVEL (France)	61–71	(Russia) Zenit Saint Petersburg	Villeurbanne
21:00 (CET)	Scoring by quarter: 18–21, 14–12, 17–21, 12–17
	Pts: Howard 12; Rebs: Wembanyama, Osetkowski 5 Asts: Jones 4 PIR: Jones 15	Boxscore	Pts: Poythress 16; Rebs: Loyd, Mickey 7 Asts: Loyd, Kulagin 7 PIR: Loyd 19	Arena: Astroballe; Attendance: 5,315; Referees: Miguel Ángel Pérez, Damir Javor, Eduard Udyanskyy

=== Round 16 ===
16 December 2021	Fenerbahçe Beko (Turkey)	75–53	(Spain) Bitci Baskonia	Istanbul
18:45 (CET)	Scoring by quarter: 19–14, 24–14, 12–15, 20–10
	Pts: de Colo 17; Rebs: three players 5 Asts: de Colo 7 PIR: de Colo 26	Boxscore	Pts: Enoch 14; Rebs: Enoch, Costello 8 Asts: L. Peters 4 PIR: Enoch 16	Arena: Ülker Sports and Event Hall; Attendance: 5,217; Referees: Robert Lottermoser, Piotr Pastusiak, Miloš Koljenšić

16 December 2021	Panathinaikos OPAP (Greece)	82–85	(Spain) Barcelona	Athens
20:00 (CET)	Scoring by quarter: 26–26, 23–15, 15–27, 18–17
	Pts: Nedović 18; Rebs: Papagiannis 8 Asts: Nedović 4 PIR: Papagiannis 17	Boxscore	Pts: Mirotić 20; Rebs: Šmits 9 Asts: Jokubaitis 6 PIR: Mirotić 32	Arena: OAKA Altion; Attendance: 6,122; Referees: Borys Ryzhyk, Fernando Rocha, Tomislav Hordov

16 December 2021	Maccabi Tel Aviv (Israel)	78–92	(Turkey) Anadolu Efes	Tel Aviv
20:05 (CET)	Scoring by quarter: 27–20, 20–30, 16–20, 15–22
	Pts: Žižić 23; Rebs: Žižić 6 Asts: Evans 9 PIR: Žižić 31	Boxscore	Pts: Larkin 26; Rebs: Moerman 8 Asts: Simon 7 PIR: Larkin 37	Arena: Menora Mivtachim Arena; Attendance: 10,316; Referees: Benjamín Jiménez, Milan Nedović, Saulius Račys

16 December 2021	A|X Armani Exchange Milan (Italy)	73–75	(Spain) Real Madrid	Assago
20:30 (CET)	Scoring by quarter: 19–18, 8–17, 21–20, 25–20
	Pts: Shields 18; Rebs: Hines, Melli 9 Asts: Rodríguez 5 PIR: Shields 19	Boxscore	Pts: Causeur 17; Rebs: Tavares 8 Asts: Llull 5 PIR: Yabusele 22	Arena: Mediolanum Forum; Attendance: 6,974; Referees: Ilija Belošević, Elias Koromilas, Tomasz Trawicki

17 December 2021	UNICS (Russia)	66–53	(Lithuania) Žalgiris	Kazan
17:00 (CET)	Scoring by quarter: 13–12, 13–11, 16–19, 24–11
	Pts: Hezonja 20; Rebs: Jekiri 9 Asts: L. Brown 10; PIR: Hezonja 22	Boxscore	Pts: Blaževič, Strēlnieks 9 Rebs: Nebo 7 Asts: Webster 6 PIR: Nebo 17	Arena: Basket-Hall Kazan; Attendance: 1,831; Referees: Sreten Radović, Juan Carlos García, Uroš Nikolić

17 December 2021	ALBA Berlin (Germany)	90–93	(Russia) CSKA Moscow	Berlin
19:00 (CET)	Scoring by quarter: 21–23, 27–25, 25–21, 17–24
	Pts: Lô 26; Rebs: Lammers, Thiemann 6 Asts: Lô 7 PIR: Lô 34	Boxscore	Pts: Voigtmann 16; Rebs: Shengelia 10; Asts: Voigtmann 5 PIR: Voigtmann 22	Arena: Mercedes-Benz Arena; Attendance: 1,973; Referees: Damir Javor, Gytis Vilius, Uroš Obrknežević

17 December 2021	AS Monaco (France)	74–85	(Russia) Zenit Saint Petersburg	Fontvieille
19:00 (CET)	Scoring by quarter: 14–31, 29–14, 14–11, 17–29
	Pts: Bacon 21; Rebs: Hall, Motiejūnas 5 Asts: James 9 PIR: James, Bacon 13	Boxscore	Pts: Loyd 20; Rebs: Ponitka, Gudaitis 7 Asts: Ponitka 5 PIR: Gudaitis 23	Arena: Salle Gaston Médecin; Attendance: 3,120; Referees: Luigi Lamonica, Emilio Pérez, Vasiliki Tsaroucha

17 December 2021	Olympiacos (Greece)	89–54	(France) LDLC ASVEL	Piraeus
20:00 (CET)	Scoring by quarter: 20–10, 19–11, 26–17, 24–16
	Pts: Dorsey 19; Rebs: Papanikolaou 6 Asts: Sloukas 5 PIR: Dorsey 20	Boxscore	Pts: Osetkowski 13; Rebs: Fall 6 Asts: Strazel 4 PIR: Fall, Knight 12	Arena: Peace and Friendship Stadium; Attendance: 6,350; Referees: Borys Ryzhyk, Oļegs Latiševs, Carlos Peruga

17 December 2021	Crvena zvezda mts (Serbia)	81–78	(Germany) Bayern Munich	Belgrade
20:45 (CET)	Scoring by quarter: 20–21, 26–24, 19–22, 16–11
	Pts: Kalinić 20; Rebs: Kalinić 7 Asts: Mitrović 8 PIR: Kalinić 24	Boxscore	Pts: Lučić 21; Rebs: Hunter 10; Asts: Weiler-Babb 5 PIR: Lučić 25	Arena: Aleksandar Nikolić Hall; Attendance: 6,894; Referees: Miguel Ángel Pérez, Mehdi Difallah, Amit Balak

=== Round 17 ===
22 December 2021	Anadolu Efes (Turkey)	84–83	(Serbia) Crvena zvezda mts	Istanbul
18:30 (CET)	Scoring by quarter: 31–21, 12–25, 22–22, 19–15
	Pts: Pleiß 23; Rebs: Pleiß 7 Asts: Larkin 9 PIR: Pleiß 27	Boxscore	Pts: Kalinić 20; Rebs: Kuzmić 11; Asts: Kalinić, Wolters 5 PIR: Kalinić, Kuzmić 17	Arena: Sinan Erdem Dome; Attendance: 8,674; Referees: Robert Lottermoser, Emilio Pérez, Guido Giovannetti

22 December 2021	ALBA Berlin (Germany)	92–84	(France) AS Monaco	Berlin
20:00 (CET)	Scoring by quarter: 23–21, 17–9, 29–26, 23–28
	Pts: Lammers 18; Rebs: Sikma 8 Asts: Sikma 7 PIR: Lammers 20	Boxscore	Pts: James 25; Rebs: Diallo 6 Asts: James 8 PIR: James 31	Arena: Mercedes-Benz Arena; Attendance: 1,973; Referees: Sreten Radović, Benjamín Jiménez, Sinan Isguder

22 December 2021	Barcelona (Spain)	111–109(OT)	(Russia) UNICS	Barcelona
21:00 (CET)	Scoring by quarter: 27–28, 10–18, 20–28, 37–20, Overtime: 17–15
	Pts: Mirotić 28; Rebs: three players 6 Asts: Laprovíttola 8 PIR: Mirotić 26	Boxscore	Pts: L. Brown 27; Rebs: L. Brown 7 Asts: L. Brown 9 PIR: L. Brown 33	Arena: Palau Blaugrana; Attendance: 4,863; Referees: Damir Javor, Mehdi Difallah, Rain Peerandi

23 December 2021	Zenit Saint Petersburg (Russia)	73–71	(Israel) Maccabi Tel Aviv	Saint Petersburg
18:00 (CET)	Scoring by quarter: 25–10, 16–16, 15–21, 17–24
	Pts: Poythress 14; Rebs: Karasev, Zubkov 4 Asts: Loyd 6 PIR: Poythress 19	Boxscore	Pts: Reynolds 24; Rebs: Reynolds 11; Asts: Wilbekin 8 PIR: Reynolds 28	Arena: Sibur Arena; Attendance: 2,129; Referees: Borys Ryzhyk, Emin Moğulkoç, Jurgis Laurinavičius

23 December 2021	Bayern Munich (Germany)	76–81	(Spain) Bitci Baskonia	Munich
19:00 (CET)	Scoring by quarter: 13–25, 29–21, 13–21, 21–14
	Pts: Rivers 16; Rebs: Lučić 14; Asts: Weiler-Babb 5 PIR: Lučić 27	Boxscore	Pts: Baldwin 30; Rebs: Costello 9 Asts: Granger 5 PIR: Baldwin 33	Arena: Audi Dome; Attendance: 0 Referees: Milivoje Jovčić, Fernando Rocha, Artūras Šukys
Note: The match was played behind closed doors due to the COVID-19 pandemic in Germany.

23 December 2021	Panathinaikos OPAP (Greece)	65–84	(Greece) Olympiacos	Athens
20:00 (CET)	Scoring by quarter: 18–25, 14–20, 19–9, 14–30
	Pts: Nedović 17; Rebs: Papagiannis 11; Asts: Nedović 7 PIR: Papagiannis 29	Boxscore	Pts: Dorsey, McKissic 18; Rebs: Fall 8 Asts: Sloukas 6 PIR: Sloukas, Vezenkov 21	Arena: OAKA Altion; Attendance: 11,852; Referees: Daniel Hierrezuelo, Ilija Belošević, Carmelo Paternicò

23 December 2021	Real Madrid (Spain)	71–65	(Russia) CSKA Moscow	Madrid
20:45 (CET)	Scoring by quarter: 24–14, 13–26, 19–15, 15–10
	Pts: Williams-Goss 17; Rebs: Tavares 10; Asts: Williams-Goss 5 PIR: Tavares 28	Boxscore	Pts: Clyburn 16; Rebs: Clyburn 13; Asts: Hackett, Shengelia 3 PIR: Milutinov 23	Arena: WiZink Center; Attendance: 5,030; Referees: Saša Pukl, Oļegs Latiševs, Milan Nedović

23 December 2021	LDLC ASVEL (France)	84–82	(Turkey) Fenerbahçe Beko	Villeurbanne
21:00 (CET)	Scoring by quarter: 21–20, 22–26, 21–14, 20–22
	Pts: Jones 27; Rebs: Howard 5 Asts: Okobo, Jones 3 PIR: Jones 30	Boxscore	Pts: Polonara 23; Rebs: Polonara 11; Asts: Veselý 5 PIR: Polonara 33	Arena: Astroballe; Attendance: 5,226; Referees: Juan Carlos García, Sašo Petek, Josip Radojković

8 February 2022	Žalgiris (Lithuania)	70–74	(Italy) A|X Armani Exchange Milan	Kaunas
19:00 (CET)	Scoring by quarter: 18–17, 17–18, 16–18, 19–21
	Pts: Lekavičius 16; Rebs: Nebo 5 Asts: Webster 6 PIR: Lekavičius 23	Boxscore	Pts: Delaney 20; Rebs: Hines, Melli 10; Asts: Hall, Rodríguez 5 PIR: Hines 21	Arena: Žalgirio arena Attendance: 5,198; Referees: Miguel Ángel Pérez, Mehdi Difallah, Seffi Shemmesh
Note: The game, originally scheduled for 22 December 2021, was postponed due to a COVID-19 outbreak within Milan's squad.

=== Round 18 ===
29 December 2021	AS Monaco (France)	82–76	(Israel) Maccabi Tel Aviv	Fontvieille
19:00 (CET)	Scoring by quarter: 13–15, 22–18, 21–18, 26–25
	Pts: Diallo, Motiejūnas 16; Rebs: Thomas 8 Asts: James 13; PIR: James 16	Boxscore	Pts: Wilbekin 31; Rebs: Evans, Žižić 7 Asts: Evans 5 PIR: Wilbekin 31	Arena: Salle Gaston Médecin; Attendance: 3,732; Referees: Miguel Ángel Pérez, Anne Panther, Ioannis Foufis

30 December 2021	UNICS (Russia)	75–67	(Turkey) Anadolu Efes	Kazan
17:00 (CET)	Scoring by quarter: 24–17, 18–21, 15–11, 18–18
	Pts: J. Brown 20; Rebs: Hezonja 9 Asts: L. Brown 6 PIR: J. Brown 28	Boxscore	Pts: Larkin 17; Rebs: Larkin 9 Asts: Beaubois 5 PIR: Dunston 23	Arena: Basket-Hall Kazan; Attendance: 2,251; Referees: Ilija Belošević, Elias Koromilas, Miloš Koljenšić

30 December 2021	Crvena zvezda mts (Serbia)	76–80(OT)	(Russia) Zenit Saint Petersburg	Belgrade
19:00 (CET)	Scoring by quarter: 21–29, 21–15, 15–6, 12–19, Overtime: 7–11
	Pts: Wolters 21; Rebs: Kalinić 6 Asts: Wolters 6 PIR: Wolters 22	Boxscore	Pts: Baron 25; Rebs: Poythress 10; Asts: Baron 6 PIR: Baron 30	Arena: Štark Arena; Attendance: 6,956; Referees: Oļegs Latiševs, Piotr Pastusiak, Robert Vyklický

30 December 2021	Bitci Baskonia (Spain)	94–75	(Spain) Barcelona	Vitoria-Gasteiz
20:30 (CET)	Scoring by quarter: 20–23, 20–11, 34–20, 20–21
	Pts: Giedraitis 20; Rebs: Enoch, Costello 10; Asts: Baldwin 8 PIR: Enoch, Giedraitis 25	Boxscore	Pts: Mirotić 19; Rebs: Martínez 7 Asts: Laprovíttola 7 PIR: Mirotić 20	Arena: Buesa Arena; Attendance: 7,802; Referees: Emin Moğulkoç, Joseph Bissang, Saulius Račys

18 January 2022	A|X Armani Exchange Milan (Italy)	84–76	(Germany) ALBA Berlin	Assago
20:30 (CET)	Scoring by quarter: 22–24, 16–16, 22–19, 24–17
	Pts: Datome 15; Rebs: Melli 9 Asts: Rodríguez 9 PIR: Rodríguez 18	Boxscore	Pts: Lô 13; Rebs: Olinde 6 Asts: Sikma 6 PIR: Lô 19	Arena: Mediolanum Forum; Attendance: 2,250; Referees: Daniel Hierrezuelo, Sašo Petek, Marcin Kowalski
Note: The game, originally scheduled for 29 December 2021, was postponed due to a COVID-19 outbreak within Milan's squad.

25 January 2022	LDLC ASVEL (France)	68–77	(Germany) Bayern Munich	Villeurbanne
21:00 (CET)	Scoring by quarter: 16–20, 13–25, 13–16, 26–16
	Pts: Jones, Fall 14; Rebs: Fall 5 Asts: Jones, Okobo 6 PIR: Fall 20	Boxscore	Pts: Rubit 17; Rebs: Rubit 10; Asts: Šiško 6 PIR: Rubit 23	Arena: Astroballe; Attendance: 2,000; Referees: Daniel Hierrezuelo, Tomasz Trawicki, Sérgio Silva
Note: The game, originally scheduled for 30 December 2021, was postponed due to a COVID-19 outbreak within ASVEL's squad.

8 February 2022	Fenerbahçe Beko (Turkey)	66–51	(Spain) Real Madrid	Istanbul
18:45 (CET)	Scoring by quarter: 19–8, 8–9, 21–13, 18–21
	Pts: Gudurić 12; Rebs: Booker, Pierre 8 Asts: Henry 9 PIR: Henry 18	Boxscore	Pts: Tavares 14; Rebs: Tavares 9 Asts: Alocén 5 PIR: Tavares 27	Arena: Ülker Sports and Event Hall; Attendance: 12,133; Referees: Sreten Radović, Gytis Vilius, Robert Vyklický
Note: The game, originally scheduled for 29 December 2021, was postponed due to a COVID-19 outbreak within Real Madrid's squad.

1 March 2022	Panathinaikos OPAP (Greece)	83–96	(Lithuania) Žalgiris	Athens
20:00 (CET)	Scoring by quarter: 10–29, 24–23, 27–24, 22–20
	Pts: Nedović 23; Rebs: Papagiannis 7 Asts: Macon 7 PIR: Nedović 25	Boxscore	Pts: Ulanovas 22; Rebs: Lauvergne 12; Asts: Lekavičius 5 PIR: Ulanovas 29	Arena: OAKA Altion; Attendance: 1,815; Referees: Carlos Peruga, Amit Balak, Luka Kardum
Note: The game, originally scheduled for 29 December 2021, was postponed due to a COVID-19 outbreak within Panathinaikos' squad. It was postponed for the second time after measures taken by Greek government related to bad weather conditions.

=== Round 19 ===
18 January 2022	LDLC ASVEL (France)	75–100	(France) AS Monaco	Villeurbanne
20:00 (CET)	Scoring by quarter: 24–27, 17–24, 17–25, 17–24
	Pts: Knight 19; Rebs: Knight 9 Asts: Okobo 5 PIR: Knight 26	Boxscore	Pts: Motiejūnas 22; Rebs: Diallo 10; Asts: James 7 PIR: Diallo 29	Arena: Astroballe; Attendance: 2,000; Referees: Matej Boltauzer, Emin Moğulkoç, Aare Halliko
Note: The game, originally scheduled for 6 January 2022, was postponed due to a COVID-19 outbreak within ASVEL's squad.

25 January 2022	Real Madrid (Spain)	85–68	(Russia) UNICS	Madrid
20:45 (CET)	Scoring by quarter: 21–14, 26–17, 27–14, 11–23
	Pts: Tavares 14; Rebs: Tavares 11; Asts: Fernández, Heurtel 4 PIR: Tavares 28	Boxscore	Pts: L. Brown, Jekiri 13; Rebs: Hezonja, Mayo 4 Asts: L. Brown 8 PIR: Jekiri 20	Arena: WiZink Center; Attendance: 4,792; Referees: Matej Boltauzer, Carmelo Paternicò, Robert Vyklický
Note: The game, originally scheduled for 6 January 2022, was postponed due to a COVID-19 outbreak within UNICS' squad.

27 February 2022	Crvena zvezda mts (Serbia)	74–69	(Turkey) Fenerbahçe Beko	Belgrade
19:00 (CET)	Scoring by quarter: 20–18, 21–19, 18–23, 15–9
	Pts: Kalinić 11; Rebs: Mitrović, Davidovac 6 Asts: Ivanović 4 PIR: Davidovac 16	Boxscore	Pts: Barthel 15; Rebs: Booker 7 Asts: de Colo 6 PIR: Pierre 17	Arena: Aleksandar Nikolić Hall; Attendance: 6,472; Referees: Miguel Ángel Pérez, Michele Rossi, Jakub Zamojski
Note: The game, originally scheduled for 6 January 2022, was postponed due to a COVID-19 outbreak within Zvezda's squad.

1 March 2022	Maccabi Tel Aviv (Israel)	94–93	(Spain) Bitci Baskonia	Tel Aviv
20:05 (CET)	Scoring by quarter: 28–27, 28–23, 15–27, 23–16
	Pts: Nunnally, Žižić 21; Rebs: Caloiaro 6 Asts: Wilbekin 6 PIR: Žižić 27	Boxscore	Pts: Baldwin 27; Rebs: Baldwin, Costello 7 Asts: Baldwin 8 PIR: Baldwin 37	Arena: Menora Mivtachim Arena; Attendance: 8,641; Referees: Damir Javor, Uroš Obrknežević, Rain Peerandi
Note: The game, originally scheduled for 6 January 2022, was postponed due to a COVID-19 outbreak within Baskonia's squad.

15 March 2022	Žalgiris (Lithuania)	73–84	(Greece) Olympiacos	Kaunas
19:00 (CET)	Scoring by quarter: 20–15, 19–24, 20–19, 14–26
	Pts: Nebo 17; Rebs: Nebo 10; Asts: Ulanovas 6 PIR: Ulanovas, Nebo 25	Boxscore	Pts: Papanikolaou 18; Rebs: Martin 7 Asts: Sloukas 6 PIR: Papanikolaou 23	Arena: Žalgirio arena Attendance: 7,369; Referees: Benjamín Jiménez, Milivoje Jovčić, Michele Rossi
Note: The game, originally scheduled for 6 January 2022, was postponed due to a COVID-19 outbreak within Olympiacos' squad.

6 April 2022	Anadolu Efes (Turkey)	81–76	(Germany) Bayern Munich	Istanbul
19:30 (CET)	Scoring by quarter: 28–21, 16–18, 23–23, 14–14
	Pts: Larkin 20; Rebs: Dunston 7 Asts: Larkin 4 PIR: Larkin 26	Boxscore	Pts: Rubit 15; Rebs: Thomas 6 Asts: Šiško 5 PIR: Šiško 17	Arena: Sinan Erdem Dome; Attendance: 14,197; Referees: Juan Carlos García, Gytis Vilius, Joseph Bissang
Note: The game, originally scheduled for 6 January 2022, was postponed due to a COVID-19 outbreak within Efes' squad.

6 April 2022	ALBA Berlin (Germany)	87–78	(Greece) Panathinaikos OPAP	Berlin
20:00 (CET)	Scoring by quarter: 28–13, 16–27, 25–15, 18–23
	Pts: da Silva 16; Rebs: Koumadje 8 Asts: Lô 7 PIR: Koumadje, Lô 18	Boxscore	Pts: Nedović 27; Rebs: Papagiannis 8 Asts: Sant-Roos 4 PIR: Nedović 25	Arena: Mercedes-Benz Arena; Attendance: 4,355; Referees: Oļegs Latiševs, Saulius Račys, Carlos Peruga
Note: The game, originally scheduled for 6 January 2022, was postponed due to a COVID-19 outbreak within Panathinaikos' squad.

=== Round 20 ===
11 January 2022	Fenerbahçe Beko (Turkey)	94–80	(Greece) Olympiacos	Istanbul
18:45 (CET)	Scoring by quarter: 11–17, 25–22, 30–20, 28–21
	Pts: Mahmutoğlu 17; Rebs: Polonara 7 Asts: Henry 8 PIR: Henry 19	Boxscore	Pts: Sloukas, Dorsey 14; Rebs: Sloukas, Dorsey 5 Asts: Sloukas 7 PIR: Sloukas 23	Arena: Ülker Sports and Event Hall; Attendance: 3,412; Referees: Miguel Ángel Pérez, Robert Lottermoser, Michele Rossi

11 January 2022	Bayern Munich (Germany)	74–65	(Lithuania) Žalgiris	Munich
20:30 (CET)	Scoring by quarter: 16–15, 18–18, 27–21, 13–11
	Pts: Jaramaz 16; Rebs: Rubit 7 Asts: Walden 5 PIR: Jaramaz 20	Boxscore	Pts: Nebo 14; Rebs: Nebo 9 Asts: Kalnietis, Lekavičius 3 PIR: Nebo 22	Arena: Audi Dome; Attendance: 0 Referees: Damir Javor, Piotr Pastusiak, Robert Vyklický
Note: The match was played behind closed doors due to the COVID-19 pandemic in Germany.

11 January 2022	Barcelona (Spain)	73–75	(Italy) A|X Armani Exchange Milan	Barcelona
21:00 (CET)	Scoring by quarter: 14–14, 14–20, 26–13, 19–28
	Pts: Kuric 22; Rebs: Kuric 5 Asts: Jokubaitis 6 PIR: Kuric 29	Boxscore	Pts: Rodríguez 18; Rebs: Hines, Bentil 4 Asts: Rodríguez 4 PIR: Rodríguez 17	Arena: Palau Blaugrana; Attendance: 4,430; Referees: Oļegs Latiševs, Fernando Rocha, Milan Nedović

12 January 2022	Panathinaikos OPAP (Greece)	74–98	(Russia) CSKA Moscow	Athens
20:00 (CET)	Scoring by quarter: 20–26, 13–34, 22–17, 19–21
	Pts: Papapetrou 16; Rebs: Evans, Macon 5 Asts: Sant-Roos 6 PIR: Perry, Papapetrou 18	Boxscore	Pts: Grigonis 19; Rebs: Bolomboy 8 Asts: Hackett 6 PIR: Hackett 26	Arena: OAKA Altion; Attendance: 870; Referees: Borys Ryzhyk, Emin Moğulkoç, Sašo Petek

25 January 2022	Maccabi Tel Aviv (Israel)	87–78	(Germany) ALBA Berlin	Tel Aviv
20:15 (CET)	Scoring by quarter: 23–23, 24–16, 20–19, 20–20
	Pts: Wilbekin 18; Rebs: Reynolds 6 Asts: Evans 8 PIR: Wilbekin 22	Boxscore	Pts: Lô 18; Rebs: Koumadje 7 Asts: Smith, Blatt 4 PIR: Lô 18	Arena: Menora Mivtachim Arena; Attendance: 9,103; Referees: Damir Javor, Leandro Lezcano, Saulius Račys

22 February 2022	AS Monaco (France)	79–76	(Russia) UNICS	Fontvieille
20:00 (CET)	Scoring by quarter: 22–19, 22–17, 17–19, 18–21
	Pts: James 25; Rebs: Motiejūnas 10; Asts: James 7 PIR: James 25	Boxscore	Pts: Hezonja 20; Rebs: Hezonja, J. Brown 8 Asts: Hezonja, L. Brown 5 PIR: J. Brown 27	Arena: Salle Gaston Médecin; Attendance: 3,189; Referees: Saša Pukl, Emilio Pérez, Sérgio Silva

8 March 2022	Crvena zvezda mts (Serbia)	65–62	(Spain) Real Madrid	Belgrade
19:00 (CET)	Scoring by quarter: 16–15, 19–13, 8–14, 22–20
	Pts: Ivanović, Davidovac 13; Rebs: Kalinić 5 Asts: Hollins, Wolters 2 PIR: Davidovac 13	Boxscore	Pts: Llull 20; Rebs: Tavares 11; Asts: Hanga, Heurtel 5 PIR: Tavares 19	Arena: Aleksandar Nikolić Hall; Attendance: 6,225; Referees: Mehdi Difallah, Elias Koromilas, Arturas Šukys

8 March 2022	Bitci Baskonia (Spain)	87–74	(Turkey) Anadolu Efes	Vitoria-Gasteiz
21:00 (CET)	Scoring by quarter: 22–24, 14–19, 26–15, 25–16
	Pts: Baldwin 20; Rebs: Costello 10; Asts: Baldwin 11; PIR: Baldwin 22	Boxscore	Pts: Micić 23; Rebs: three players 4 Asts: Larkin 5 PIR: Larkin 25	Arena: Buesa Arena; Attendance: 6,311; Referees: Saša Pukl, Carmelo Paternicò, Amit Balak

=== Round 21 ===
13 January 2022	Bayern Munich (Germany)	78–83	(France) AS Monaco	Munich
20:30 (CET)	Scoring by quarter: 18–19, 17–21, 19–22, 24–21
	Pts: Walden 26; Rebs: Rubit 7 Asts: Walden 5 PIR: Walden 34	Boxscore	Pts: James 26; Rebs: Motiejūnas 5 Asts: James 6 PIR: James 23	Arena: Audi Dome; Attendance: 0 Referees: Ilija Belošević, Fernando Rocha, Luka Kardum
Note: The match was played behind closed doors due to the COVID-19 pandemic in Germany.

13 January 2022	Barcelona (Spain)	82–77	(Turkey) Anadolu Efes	Barcelona
21:00 (CET)	Scoring by quarter: 19–17, 21–24, 21–15, 21–21
	Pts: Jokubaitis 16; Rebs: Şanlı 7 Asts: Laprovíttola 5 PIR: Şanlı 16	Boxscore	Pts: Micić 18; Rebs: Dunston 6 Asts: Larkin 4 PIR: Micić, Larkin 17	Arena: Palau Blaugrana; Attendance: 5,260; Referees: Damir Javor, Borys Ryzhyk, Tomislav Hordov

14 January 2022	CSKA Moscow (Russia)	90–83	(France) LDLC ASVEL	Moscow
18:00 (CET)	Scoring by quarter: 23–23, 17–16, 22–22, 28–22
	Pts: Hackett 27; Rebs: Milutinov 9 Asts: three players 4 PIR: Hackett 38	Boxscore	Pts: Knight 16; Rebs: Gist 8 Asts: Okobo 5 PIR: Gist 22	Arena: Megasport Arena; Attendance: 2,693; Referees: Saša Pukl, Elias Koromilas, Jordi Aliaga

14 January 2022	Real Madrid (Spain)	89–74	(Spain) Bitci Baskonia	Madrid
20:45 (CET)	Scoring by quarter: 25–17, 25–18, 19–15, 20–24
	Pts: Yabusele 17; Rebs: Randolph 12; Asts: four players 3 PIR: Yabusele 27	Boxscore	Pts: Baldwin 16; Rebs: A. Peters 5 Asts: Baldwin 6 PIR: Baldwin 20	Arena: WiZink Center; Attendance: 4,553; Referees: Sreten Radović, Milivoje Jovčić, Robert Vyklický

29 March 2022	Panathinaikos OPAP (Greece)	83–95	(Israel) Maccabi Tel Aviv	Athens
18:00 (CEST)	Scoring by quarter: 26–23, 20–32, 12–15, 25–25
	Pts: Nedović 21; Rebs: Papagiannis 11; Asts: three players 4 PIR: Nedović 20	Boxscore	Pts: Williams 17; Rebs: Reynolds 9 Asts: Wilbekin 9 PIR: Williams 23	Arena: OAKA Altion; Attendance: 1,852; Referees: Gytis Vilius, Ilija Belošević, Fernando Rocha

29 March 2022	Fenerbahçe Beko (Turkey)	57–66	(Germany) ALBA Berlin	Istanbul
20:00 (CEST)	Scoring by quarter: 19–16, 8–21, 11–11, 19–18
	Pts: Mahmutoğlu 16; Rebs: Pierre 7 Asts: four players 3 PIR: Pierre 15	Boxscore	Pts: Zoosman 20; Rebs: da Silva 9 Asts: Smith 6 PIR: Zoosman 18	Arena: Ülker Sports and Event Hall; Attendance: 6,079; Referees: Borys Ryzhyk, Emilio Pérez, Tomasz Trawicki

3 April 2022	Žalgiris (Lithuania)	103–98(OT)	(Serbia) Crvena zvezda mts	Kaunas
19:00 (CET)	Scoring by quarter: 23–14, 22–18, 15–35, 28–21, Overtime: 15–10
	Pts: Ulanovas 18; Rebs: Jankūnas, Ulanovas 7 Asts: Lekavičius 7 PIR: Lekavičius 26	Boxscore	Pts: Dobrić 21; Rebs: Kalinić 7 Asts: Wolters 7 PIR: Dobrić 23	Arena: Žalgirio arena Attendance: 10,206; Referees: Sreten Radović, Hugues Thépénier, Marcin Kowalski

=== Round 22 ===
20 January 2022	UNICS (Russia)	70–64	(Spain) Barcelona	Kazan
17:00 (CET)	Scoring by quarter: 17–14, 14–21, 23–13, 16–16
	Pts: L. Brown 22; Rebs: Hezonja 11; Asts: L. Brown 8 PIR: L. Brown 29	Boxscore	Pts: Higgins 17; Rebs: Šmits 6 Asts: Calathes 5 PIR: Davies 15	Arena: Basket-Hall Kazan; Attendance: 5,251; Referees: Robert Lottermoser, Elias Koromilas, Joseph Bissang

20 January 2022	Zenit Saint Petersburg (Russia)	77–86	(France) AS Monaco	Saint Petersburg
18:00 (CET)	Scoring by quarter: 17–18, 15–18, 18–21, 27–29
	Pts: Mickey 18; Rebs: Zubkov 7 Asts: Loyd 5 PIR: Mickey 27	Boxscore	Pts: James 21; Rebs: Motiejūnas 8 Asts: James 5 PIR: James 22	Arena: Sibur Arena; Attendance: 2,414; Referees: Damir Javor, Amit Balak, Uroš Obrknežević

20 January 2022	Fenerbahçe Beko (Turkey)	73–67	(Lithuania) Žalgiris	Istanbul
18:45 (CET)	Scoring by quarter: 7–13, 17–17, 20–21, 29–16
	Pts: Gudurić 19; Rebs: Polonara 8 Asts: Gudurić 5 PIR: Gudurić 27	Boxscore	Pts: Ulanovas 16; Rebs: Cavanaugh 13; Asts: Blaževič, Kalnietis 4 PIR: Blaževič 17	Arena: Ülker Sports and Event Hall; Attendance: 3,813; Referees: Juan Carlos García, Carmelo Paternicò, Luka Kardum

20 January 2022	ALBA Berlin (Germany)	74–89	(Spain) Real Madrid	Berlin
20:00 (CET)	Scoring by quarter: 15–19, 21–29, 20–25, 18–16
	Pts: Lô 21; Rebs: Sikma 9 Asts: Sikma 7 PIR: Lô 30	Boxscore	Pts: Heurtel 17; Rebs: three players 5 Asts: Heurtel 7 PIR: Heurtel 18	Arena: Mercedes-Benz Arena; Attendance: 1,600; Referees: Ilija Belošević, Fernando Rocha, Jakub Zamojski

20 January 2022	Maccabi Tel Aviv (Israel)	84–69	(Greece) Olympiacos	Tel Aviv
20:05 (CET)	Scoring by quarter: 19–16, 21–22, 26–18, 18–13
	Pts: Žižić 23; Rebs: Žižić 6 Asts: Evans, Nunnally 4 PIR: Žižić 33	Boxscore	Pts: Printezis 13; Rebs: Martin 8 Asts: Sloukas 5 PIR: Printezis 14	Arena: Menora Mivtachim Arena; Attendance: 8,982; Referees: Oļegs Latiševs, Anne Panther, Hugues Thépénier

21 January 2022	CSKA Moscow (Russia)	57–67	(Italy) A|X Armani Exchange Milan	Moscow
18:00 (CET)	Scoring by quarter: 10–23, 25–17, 11–15, 11–12
	Pts: Lundberg 15; Rebs: Shengelia 7 Asts: Shengelia, Lundberg 2 PIR: Lundberg 15	Boxscore	Pts: Daniels, Hall 13; Rebs: Rodríguez, Melli 5 Asts: Rodríguez 3 PIR: Hines 19	Arena: Megasport Arena; Attendance: 3,233; Referees: Matej Boltauzer, Benjamín Jiménez, Gytis Vilius

21 January 2022	Anadolu Efes (Turkey)	82–81	(Greece) Panathinaikos OPAP	Istanbul
18:30 (CET)	Scoring by quarter: 17–12, 22–30, 26–20, 17–19
	Pts: Micić 20; Rebs: Moerman, Simon 5 Asts: Micić 6 PIR: Dunston 20	Boxscore	Pts: Nedović 20; Rebs: Evans 10; Asts: Nedović 3 PIR: Nedović 22	Arena: Sinan Erdem Dome; Attendance: 7,834; Referees: Daniel Hierrezuelo, Sreten Radović, Milan Nedović

21 January 2022	Bitci Baskonia (Spain)	77–84	(Germany) Bayern Munich	Vitoria-Gasteiz
20:30 (CET)	Scoring by quarter: 17–16, 16–26, 22–19, 22–23
	Pts: Baldwin 23; Rebs: Sedekerskis 8 Asts: Baldwin 4 PIR: Baldwin 30	Boxscore	Pts: three players 17; Rebs: Hunter 8 Asts: Weiler-Babb 8 PIR: Walden 23	Arena: Buesa Arena; Attendance: 5,587; Referees: Mehdi Difallah, Emin Moğulkoç, Sašo Petek

21 January 2022	LDLC ASVEL (France)	69–67	(Serbia) Crvena zvezda mts	Villeurbanne
21:00 (CET)	Scoring by quarter: 11–17, 14–18, 24–13, 20–19
	Pts: Lacombe, Jones 17; Rebs: Lacombe, Kahudi 7 Asts: Jones 5 PIR: Jones 22	Boxscore	Pts: Dobrić 20; Rebs: Mitrović 7 Asts: Wolters 5 PIR: Mitrović 16	Arena: Astroballe; Attendance: 2,000; Referees: Luigi Lamonica, Emilio Pérez, Vasiliki Tsaroucha

=== Round 23 ===
27 January 2022	Zenit Saint Petersburg (Russia)	76–67	(Turkey) Anadolu Efes	Saint Petersburg
18:00 (CET)	Scoring by quarter: 17–18, 20–18, 15–6, 24–25
	Pts: Poythress 21; Rebs: Poythress 9 Asts: Loyd 8 PIR: Poythress 27	Boxscore	Pts: Micić 22; Rebs: Micić, Moerman 6 Asts: Dunston 5 PIR: Simon 21	Arena: Sibur Arena; Attendance: 2,353; Referees: Juan Carlos García, Milivoje Jovčić, Joseph Bissang

27 January 2022	Olympiacos (Greece)	72–76	(Serbia) Crvena zvezda mts	Piraeus
20:00 (CET)	Scoring by quarter: 21–22, 15–15, 16–19, 20–20
	Pts: Vezenkov 20; Rebs: Vezenkov 8 Asts: Walkup 5 PIR: Vezenkov 24	Boxscore	Pts: Dobrić 14; Rebs: White 8 Asts: Dobrić, Kalinić 4 PIR: Dobrić 18	Arena: Peace and Friendship Stadium; Attendance: 1,000; Referees: Daniel Hierrezuelo, Amit Balak, Sérgio Silva

27 January 2022	Barcelona (Spain)	84–71	(France) LDLC ASVEL	Barcelona
21:00 (CET)	Scoring by quarter: 28–17, 17–13, 23–20, 16–21
	Pts: Laprovíttola 20; Rebs: Mirotić 7 Asts: Calathes 6 PIR: Mirotić 20	Boxscore	Pts: Fall 20; Rebs: Fall 7 Asts: Okobo 8 PIR: Fall 30	Arena: Palau Blaugrana; Attendance: 4,466; Referees: Matej Boltauzer, Carmelo Paternicò, Gentian Cici

28 January 2022	UNICS (Russia)	75–86	(Russia) CSKA Moscow	Kazan
17:00 (CET)	Scoring by quarter: 20–16, 12–21, 25–27, 18–22
	Pts: Hezonja, L. Brown 21; Rebs: Hezonja 9 Asts: L. Brown 9 PIR: L. Brown 26	Boxscore	Pts: Shved 27; Rebs: Milutinov 7 Asts: Hackett 5 PIR: Milutinov 28	Arena: Basket-Hall Kazan; Attendance: 4,321; Referees: Milivoje Jovčić, Damir Javor, Uroš Nikolić

28 January 2022	AS Monaco (France)	84–90(OT)	(Spain) Real Madrid	Fontvieille
19:00 (CET)	Scoring by quarter: 18–16, 16–19, 23–21, 9–10, Overtime: 9–9, 9–15
	Pts: Bacon, Diallo 19; Rebs: Motiejūnas 11; Asts: James 7 PIR: Diallo 23	Boxscore	Pts: Yabusele 18; Rebs: Poirier 14; Asts: Heurtel 9 PIR: Yabusele 27	Arena: Salle Gaston Médecin; Attendance: 3,400; Referees: Oļegs Latiševs, Milan Nedović, Jurgis Laurinavičius

28 January 2022	Panathinaikos OPAP (Greece)	75–63	(Spain) Bitci Baskonia	Athens
20:00 (CET)	Scoring by quarter: 22–8, 16–12, 19–12, 18–31
	Pts: Nedović 16; Rebs: Sant-Roos 5 Asts: Bochoridis, Papapetrou 5 PIR: Evans 18	Boxscore	Pts: Baldwin 16; Rebs: Enoch 11; Asts: Baldwin 8 PIR: Baldwin 24	Arena: OAKA Altion; Attendance: 951; Referees: Luigi Lamonica, Fernando Rocha, Saulius Račys

28 January 2022	A|X Armani Exchange Milan (Italy)	65–58	(Lithuania) Žalgiris	Assago
20:30 (CET)	Scoring by quarter: 20–20, 19–10, 15–15, 11–13
	Pts: Hall, Daniels 12; Rebs: Hines 6 Asts: Hall, Hines 4 PIR: Hines 22	Boxscore	Pts: Blaževič, Lekavičius 13; Rebs: Ulanovas 8 Asts: Ulanovas, Lekavičius 4 PIR: three players 10	Arena: Mediolanum Forum; Attendance: 3,067; Referees: Borys Ryzhyk, Tomislav Hordov, Igor Dragojević

28 January 2022	Bayern Munich (Germany)	62–56	(Germany) ALBA Berlin	Munich
20:30 (CET)	Scoring by quarter: 16–16, 10–8, 15–20, 21–12
	Pts: Lučić 19; Rebs: Weiler-Babb 7 Asts: Weiler-Babb 6 PIR: Lučić 21	Boxscore	Pts: Lô, Smith 13; Rebs: Sikma 9 Asts: Lô 4 PIR: Lô 15	Arena: Audi Dome; Attendance: 1,346; Referees: Saša Pukl, Gytis Vilius, Sébastien Clivaz

13 April 2022	Maccabi Tel Aviv (Israel)	85–76	(Turkey) Fenerbahçe Beko	Tel Aviv
19:30 (CET)	Scoring by quarter: 21–21, 24–22, 21–19, 19–14
	Pts: Nunnally 19; Rebs: Nunnally, Žižić 7 Asts: Wilbekin 6 PIR: Nunnally 25	Boxscore	Pts: Booker 14; Rebs: Düverioğlu 5 Asts: Henry 8 PIR: Booker 14	Arena: Menora Mivtachim Arena; Referees: Sreten Radović, Sašo Petek, Jordi Aliaga
Note: The match, originally scheduled for 27 January 2022, was postponed due to a COVID-19 outbreak within Fenerbahçe's squad.

=== Round 24 ===
1 February 2022	Fenerbahçe Beko (Turkey)	85–76	(France) LDLC ASVEL	Istanbul
18:45 (CET)	Scoring by quarter: 29–23, 18–18, 17–22, 21–13
	Pts: Booker, Pierre 16; Rebs: Pierre 8 Asts: Henry 7 PIR: Pierre 21	Boxscore	Pts: Okobo 23; Rebs: Kahudi 6 Asts: Jones 8 PIR: Kahudi 16	Arena: Ülker Sports and Event Hall; Attendance: 5,773; Referees: Damir Javor, Uroš Nikolić, Jakub Zamojski

1 February 2022	Crvena zvezda mts (Serbia)	57–63	(Italy) A|X Armani Exchange Milan	Belgrade
19:00 (CET)	Scoring by quarter: 8–7, 15–19, 21–24, 13–13
	Pts: Hollins, Kalinić 13; Rebs: Davidovac 6 Asts: Kalinić 4 PIR: Kalinić 17	Boxscore	Pts: Delaney 18; Rebs: Bentil 9 Asts: Rodríguez 4 PIR: Delaney 19	Arena: Aleksandar Nikolić Hall; Attendance: 5,638; Referees: Oļegs Latiševs, Emin Moğulkoç, Carlos Cortés

1 February 2022	Žalgiris (Lithuania)	78–94	(Israel) Maccabi Tel Aviv	Kaunas
19:00 (CET)	Scoring by quarter: 19–21, 28–26, 13–17, 18–30
	Pts: Blaževič 20; Rebs: Ulanovas 6 Asts: Lekavičius 9 PIR: Blaževič 26	Boxscore	Pts: Nunnally 32; Rebs: Evans, Reynolds 5 Asts: Evans, Wilbekin 5 PIR: Nunnally 38	Arena: Žalgirio arena Attendance: 4,863; Referees: Daniel Hierrezuelo, Joseph Bissang, Rain Peerandi

1 February 2022	Panathinaikos OPAP (Greece)	83–91	(France) AS Monaco	Athens
20:00 (CET)	Scoring by quarter: 27–19, 15–30, 19–16, 22–26
	Pts: Jović, Evans 16; Rebs: Kaselakis 7 Asts: Nedović 4 PIR: Evans 23	Boxscore	Pts: James 29; Rebs: Motiejūnas 7 Asts: James 3 PIR: James 29	Arena: OAKA Altion; Attendance: 955; Referees: Juan Carlos García, Tomislav Hordov, Sašo Petek

1 February 2022	Bitci Baskonia (Spain)	82–90	(Russia) Zenit Saint Petersburg	Vitoria-Gasteiz
20:30 (CET)	Scoring by quarter: 24–22, 26–22, 14–18, 18–28
	Pts: Baldwin 16; Rebs: Enoch 8 Asts: Costello, Giedraitis 4 PIR: Giedraitis 21	Boxscore	Pts: Baron 24; Rebs: Loyd 7 Asts: Loyd 3 PIR: Loyd 29	Arena: Buesa Arena; Attendance: 5,376; Referees: Ilija Belošević, Gytis Vilius, Carmelo Paternicò

1 February 2022	Barcelona (Spain)	71–66	(Germany) Bayern Munich	Barcelona
21:00 (CET)	Scoring by quarter: 9–9, 19–20, 17–12, 26–25
	Pts: Kuric 20; Rebs: Mirotić 6 Asts: Calathes 4 PIR: Mirotić, Kuric 22	Boxscore	Pts: Lučić 16; Rebs: Rubit 10; Asts: Rubit 3 PIR: Lučić 16	Arena: Palau Blaugrana; Attendance: 5,473; Referees: Luigi Lamonica, Sreten Radović, Mario Majkić

2 February 2022	CSKA Moscow (Russia)	97–99(OT)	(Turkey) Anadolu Efes	Moscow
18:00 (CET)	Scoring by quarter: 16–23, 25–21, 23–13, 22–29, Overtime: 11–13
	Pts: Hackett 31; Rebs: Clyburn, Milutinov 7 Asts: three players 4 PIR: Hackett 32	Boxscore	Pts: Larkin 26; Rebs: Pleiß 12; Asts: Larkin 9 PIR: Larkin 36	Arena: Megasport Arena; Attendance: 2,714; Referees: Robert Lottermoser, Fernando Rocha, Emilio Pérez

2 February 2022	ALBA Berlin (Germany)	81–53	(Russia) UNICS	Berlin
20:00 (CET)	Scoring by quarter: 16–11, 20–15, 20–9, 25–18
	Pts: Lô 16; Rebs: Sikma 9 Asts: Thiemann, Sikma 4 PIR: Sikma 24	Boxscore	Pts: L. Brown 12; Rebs: Jekiri 11; Asts: Spissu 3 PIR: Jekiri 19	Arena: Mercedes-Benz Arena; Attendance: 1,600; Referees: Borys Ryzhyk, Ioannis Foufis, Aare Halliko

2 February 2022	Real Madrid (Spain)	75–67	(Greece) Olympiacos	Madrid
20:45 (CET)	Scoring by quarter: 10–15, 14–23, 26–13, 25–16
	Pts: Heurtel 20; Rebs: Yabusele, Tavares 9 Asts: Llull 4 PIR: Tavares 24	Boxscore	Pts: Vezenkov 16; Rebs: Papanikolaou 7 Asts: Sloukas 6 PIR: Vezenkov 20	Arena: WiZink Center; Attendance: 5,723; Referees: Mehdi Difallah, Piotr Pastusiak, Saulius Račys

=== Round 25 ===
3 February 2022	Crvena zvezda mts (Serbia)	80–91	(France) AS Monaco	Belgrade
19:00 (CET)	Scoring by quarter: 30–19, 22–23, 12–22, 16–27
	Pts: Hollins 19; Rebs: Kuzmić 5 Asts: Wolters 5 PIR: Ivanović 24	Boxscore	Pts: Motiejūnas 20; Rebs: Diallo 7 Asts: James 6 PIR: Motiejūnas 20	Arena: Aleksandar Nikolić Hall; Attendance: 4,247; Referees: Carmelo Paternicò, Leandro Lezcano, Gentian Cici

3 February 2022	Bayern Munich (Germany)	70–52	(Israel) Maccabi Tel Aviv	Munich
20:30 (CET)	Scoring by quarter: 13–16, 17–13, 19–12, 21–11
	Pts: Walden 13; Rebs: Weiler-Babb 6 Asts: Jaramaz 4 PIR: Lučić 15	Boxscore	Pts: Wilbekin 20; Rebs: Reynolds, Williams 6 Asts: Wilbekin, Nunnally 2 PIR: Wilbekin 25	Arena: Audi Dome; Attendance: 1,300; Referees: Benjamín Jiménez, Tomislav Hordov, Uroš Nikolić

3 February 2022	A|X Armani Exchange Milan (Italy)	60–71	(Turkey) Fenerbahçe Beko	Assago
20:30 (CET)	Scoring by quarter: 12–18, 22–25, 17–11, 9–17
	Pts: Bentil 12; Rebs: Hines, Ricci 4 Asts: Delaney 5 PIR: Delaney 16	Boxscore	Pts: Gudurić 17; Rebs: Booker 8 Asts: Gudurić 6 PIR: Gudurić 24	Arena: Mediolanum Forum; Attendance: 3,900; Referees: Saša Pukl, Joseph Bissang, Josip Radojković

3 February 2022	Barcelona (Spain)	86–60	(Greece) Panathinaikos OPAP	Barcelona
21:00 (CET)	Scoring by quarter: 17–15, 28–10, 18–17, 23–18
	Pts: Hayes 14; Rebs: Exum 6 Asts: Laprovíttola 4 PIR: Exum, Hayes 17	Boxscore	Pts: Papagiannis 18; Rebs: Papagiannis, White 4 Asts: Macon, White 3 PIR: Papagiannis 21	Arena: Palau Blaugrana; Attendance: 4,980; Referees: Damir Javor, Emin Moğulkoç, Tomasz Trawicki

4 February 2022	CSKA Moscow (Russia)	91–72	(Germany) ALBA Berlin	Moscow
18:00 (CET)	Scoring by quarter: 22–15, 28–22, 19–19, 22–16
	Pts: Milutinov 21; Rebs: Milutinov 11; Asts: Shved 13; PIR: Milutinov 36	Boxscore	Pts: Sikma 15; Rebs: Sikma 9 Asts: Lô 6 PIR: Sikma 25	Arena: Megasport Arena; Attendance: 2,643; Referees: Sreten Radović, Milivoje Jovčić, Seffi Shemmesh

4 February 2022	Anadolu Efes (Turkey)	78–72	(France) LDLC ASVEL	Istanbul
18:30 (CET)	Scoring by quarter: 15–16, 17–20, 22–14, 24–22
	Pts: Larkin 19; Rebs: Pleiß 6 Asts: Larkin 8 PIR: Larkin 23	Boxscore	Pts: Knight 21; Rebs: Knight 12; Asts: Jones 6 PIR: Knight 30	Arena: Sinan Erdem Dome; Attendance: 9,032; Referees: Ilija Belošević, Anne Panther, Rain Peerandi

4 February 2022	Žalgiris (Lithuania)	67–76	(Russia) UNICS	Kaunas
19:00 (CET)	Scoring by quarter: 26–24, 13–21, 15–18, 13–13
	Pts: Ulanovas 16; Rebs: Ulanovas 7 Asts: Lekavičius 3 PIR: Lekavičius, Ulanovas 20	Boxscore	Pts: L. Brown 19; Rebs: J. Brown 11; Asts: L. Brown 10; PIR: J. Brown 23	Arena: Žalgirio arena Attendance: 5,307; Referees: Luigi Lamonica, Emilio Pérez, Amit Balak

4 February 2022	Bitci Baskonia (Spain)	62–72	(Greece) Olympiacos	Vitoria-Gasteiz
20:30 (CET)	Scoring by quarter: 13–18, 16–14, 15–18, 18–22
	Pts: A. Peters 18; Rebs: A. Peters 7 Asts: Baldwin 7 PIR: A. Peters 23	Boxscore	Pts: Dorsey 17; Rebs: Fall 9 Asts: three players 3 PIR: Vezenkov 18	Arena: Buesa Arena; Attendance: 6,773; Referees: Robert Lottermoser, Matej Boltauzer, Michele Rossi

4 February 2022	Real Madrid (Spain)	85–64	(Russia) Zenit Saint Petersburg	Madrid
20:45 (CET)	Scoring by quarter: 23–23, 22–13, 24–15, 16–13
	Pts: Llull, Yabusele 13; Rebs: Poirier 8 Asts: Heurtel 6 PIR: Poirier 21	Boxscore	Pts: Poythress 21; Rebs: Poythress 9 Asts: Kulagin 4 PIR: Poythress 23	Arena: WiZink Center; Attendance: 5,457; Referees: Borys Ryzhyk, Elias Koromilas, Luka Kardum

=== Round 26 ===
10 February 2022	Olympiacos (Greece)	87–85(OT)	(Turkey) Anadolu Efes	Piraeus
20:00 (CET)	Scoring by quarter: 26–17, 16–24, 19–20, 14–14, Overtime: 12–10
	Pts: Sloukas 23; Rebs: Vezenkov 9 Asts: Sloukas 6 PIR: Sloukas 23	Boxscore	Pts: Pleiß 14; Rebs: Moerman 8 Asts: Micić 13; PIR: Micić 25	Arena: Peace and Friendship Stadium; Attendance: 1,000; Referees: Sreten Radović, Carmelo Paternicò, Miloš Koljenšić

10 February 2022	ALBA Berlin (Germany)	76–67	(Russia) Zenit Saint Petersburg	Berlin
20:00 (CET)	Scoring by quarter: 23–12, 11–22, 17–14, 25–19
	Pts: Lô 15; Rebs: Zoosman 7 Asts: Blatt, Lô 4 PIR: Lô 24	Boxscore	Pts: Baron, Kuzminskas 18; Rebs: Loyd 8 Asts: Baron 5 PIR: Kuzminskas 18	Arena: Mercedes-Benz Arena; Attendance: 1,600; Referees: Miguel Ángel Pérez, Milan Nedović, Jakub Zamojski

10 February 2022	AS Monaco (France)	82–83	(Lithuania) Žalgiris	Fontvieille
20:00 (CET)	Scoring by quarter: 23–18, 23–18, 18–25, 18–22
	Pts: Bacon, James 18; Rebs: Motiejūnas 6 Asts: James 4 PIR: Bacon 18	Boxscore	Pts: Giffey 15; Rebs: Ulanovas 6 Asts: Lekavičius 6 PIR: Giffey 23	Arena: Salle Gaston Médecin; Attendance: 3,259; Referees: Milivoje Jovčić, Jordi Aliaga, Kristaps Konstantinovs

10 February 2022	Maccabi Tel Aviv (Israel)	84–75	(Russia) CSKA Moscow	Tel Aviv
20:05 (CET)	Scoring by quarter: 23–17, 26–11, 18–18, 17–29
	Pts: Wilbekin 23; Rebs: Reynolds 6 Asts: Evans 4 PIR: Wilbekin 25	Boxscore	Pts: Lundberg 17; Rebs: Milutinov 6 Asts: Hackett 7 PIR: Lundberg 23	Arena: Menora Mivtachim Arena; Attendance: 9,923; Referees: Luigi Lamonica, Carlos Cortés, Gytis Vilius

10 February 2022	A|X Armani Exchange Milan (Italy)	89–78	(Spain) Bitci Baskonia	Assago
20:30 (CET)	Scoring by quarter: 21–10, 19–15, 26–23, 23–30
	Pts: Hall 15; Rebs: Melli 11; Asts: Delaney 6 PIR: Melli 23	Boxscore	Pts: Costello 23; Rebs: A. Peters 6 Asts: Granger 7 PIR: Baldwin 27	Arena: Mediolanum Forum; Attendance: 3,400; Referees: Damir Javor, Uroš Nikolić, Piotr Pastusiak

11 February 2022	UNICS (Russia)	77–84	(Serbia) Crvena zvezda mts	Kazan
17:00 (CET)	Scoring by quarter: 11–22, 32–21, 22–20, 12–21
	Pts: Hezonja 18; Rebs: Hezonja 9 Asts: Spissu 6 PIR: Hezonja 21	Boxscore	Pts: Kalinić 20; Rebs: White 6 Asts: Kalinić, Marković 6 PIR: Kalinić 22	Arena: Basket-Hall Kazan; Attendance: 3,523; Referees: Benjamín Jiménez, Mehdi Difallah, Jurgis Laurinavičius

11 February 2022	LDLC ASVEL (France)	63–76	(Greece) Panathinaikos OPAP	Villeurbanne
20:00 (CET)	Scoring by quarter: 15–23, 17–23, 21–13, 10–17
	Pts: Osetkowski 18; Rebs: Fall 9 Asts: Jones 7 PIR: Osetkowski 23	Boxscore	Pts: White 19; Rebs: Papagiannis 10; Asts: Jović, Macon 5 PIR: Papagiannis 24	Arena: Astroballe; Attendance: 4,593; Referees: Robert Lottermoser, Emilio Pérez, Arturas Šukys

11 February 2022	Real Madrid (Spain)	68–86	(Spain) Barcelona	Madrid
20:45 (CET)	Scoring by quarter: 8–28, 23–24, 24–19, 13–15
	Pts: Tavares 25; Rebs: Hanga, Tavares 6 Asts: Llull 4 PIR: Tavares 35	Boxscore	Pts: Laprovíttola 20; Rebs: Laprovíttola 7 Asts: Calathes, Jokubaitis 5 PIR: Laprovíttola 27	Arena: WiZink Center; Attendance: 9,131; Referees: Ilija Belošević, Fernando Rocha, Tomislav Hordov

4 April 2022	Fenerbahçe Beko (Turkey)	81–76	(Germany) Bayern Munich	Istanbul
19:45 (CET)	Scoring by quarter: 27−16, 18−15, 9−31, 27−14
	Pts: Henry 22; Rebs: Vesely 10; Asts: Henry 8 PIR: Henry 31	Boxscore	Pts: Rubit 17; Rebs: Rubit 5 Asts: Šiško; PIR: Rubit 22	Arena: Ülker Sports and Event Hall; Attendance: 8,288; Referees: Milivoje Jovčić, Elias Koromilas, Luka Kardum

=== Round 27 ===
24 February 2022	Anadolu Efes (Turkey)	109–77	(Israel) Maccabi Tel Aviv	Istanbul
18:30 (CET)	Scoring by quarter: 21–10, 24–21, 29–16, 35–30
	Pts: Micić 20; Rebs: Bryant 6 Asts: Micić 10; PIR: Micić 30	Boxscore	Pts: Wilbekin, Žižić 17; Rebs: Žižić 8 Asts: Wilbekin 6 PIR: Wilbekin 24	Arena: Sinan Erdem Dome; Attendance: 14,671; Referees: Miguel Ángel Pérez, Sašo Petek, Elias Koromilas

24 February 2022	Žalgiris (Lithuania)	68–47	(Spain) Real Madrid	Kaunas
19:00 (CET)	Scoring by quarter: 18–11, 20–18, 11–8, 19–10
	Pts: Ulanovas 15; Rebs: Nebo 9 Asts: Lekavičius 4 PIR: Ulanovas 17	Boxscore	Pts: Tavares 12; Rebs: Tavares 12; Asts: Llull 4 PIR: Tavares 20	Arena: Žalgirio arena Attendance: 6,589; Referees: Emin Moğulkoç, Uroš Nikolić, Igor Dragojević

24 February 2022	Olympiacos (Greece)	67–58	(Italy) A|X Armani Exchange Milan	Piraeus
20:45 (CET)	Scoring by quarter: 7–15, 18–12, 14–16, 28–15
	Pts: Sloukas, Vezenkov 16; Rebs: Fall 7 Asts: Sloukas 4 PIR: Vezenkov 20	Boxscore	Pts: Hall 15; Rebs: Melli 11; Asts: Rodríguez 6 PIR: Melli 22	Arena: Peace and Friendship Stadium; Attendance: 5,625; Referees: Borys Ryzhyk, Gytis Vilius, Milan Nedović

24 February 2022	LDLC ASVEL (France)	80–82	(Germany) ALBA Berlin	Villeurbanne
21:00 (CET)	Scoring by quarter: 21–21, 19–22, 15–17, 25–22
	Pts: Jones 22; Rebs: Knight 6 Asts: Jones 5 PIR: Jones 23	Boxscore	Pts: Smith 16; Rebs: Delow, Lammers 6 Asts: Lô 5 PIR: Mattisseck, Smith 17	Arena: Astroballe; Attendance: 4,763; Referees: Juan Carlos García, Carmelo Paternicò, Saulius Račys

25 February 2022	Panathinaikos OPAP (Greece)	79–73	(Serbia) Crvena zvezda mts	Athens
20:00 (CET)	Scoring by quarter: 17–23, 25–18, 17–18, 20–14
	Pts: Nedović 25; Rebs: Evans 9 Asts: Macon, Nedović 5 PIR: Nedović 25	Boxscore	Pts: White 14; Rebs: White 12; Asts: Kalinić 6 PIR: White 27	Arena: OAKA Altion; Attendance: 1,850; Referees: Daniel Hierrezuelo, Anne Panther, Seffi Shemmesh

25 February 2022	AS Monaco (France)	92–78	(Turkey) Fenerbahçe Beko	Fontvieille
20:00 (CET)	Scoring by quarter: 19–20, 36–13, 20–22, 17–23
	Pts: Diallo 24; Rebs: Motiejūnas 9 Asts: Westermann 6 PIR: Diallo 26	Boxscore	Pts: de Colo 19; Rebs: Pierre 6 Asts: Pierre 3 PIR: de Colo 19	Arena: Salle Gaston Médecin; Attendance: 3,400; Referees: Luigi Lamonica, Benjamín Jiménez, Marcin Kowalski

=== Round 28 ===
3 March 2022	Anadolu Efes (Turkey)	84–79	(Turkey) Fenerbahçe Beko	Istanbul
18:30 (CET)	Scoring by quarter: 23–14, 18–11, 18–23, 25–31
	Pts: Micić 24; Rebs: Pleiß 9 Asts: Larkin 9 PIR: Micić 23	Boxscore	Pts: Pierre 19; Rebs: Pierre, Polonara 7 Asts: Hazer 5 PIR: Pierre 23	Arena: Sinan Erdem Dome; Attendance: 15,076; Referees: Juan Carlos García, Fernando Rocha, Saulius Račys

3 March 2022	Crvena zvezda mts (Serbia)	86–83	(Spain) Bitci Baskonia	Belgrade
19:00 (CET)	Scoring by quarter: 13–26, 28–15, 14–15, 31–27
	Pts: Mitrović 18; Rebs: White 6 Asts: three players 4 PIR: Mitrović 24	Boxscore	Pts: Fontecchio 19; Rebs: Fontecchio 8 Asts: Granger 7 PIR: Costello, Granger 22	Arena: Aleksandar Nikolić Hall; Attendance: 4,879; Referees: Luigi Lamonica, Ioannis Foufis, Robert Vyklický

3 March 2022	ALBA Berlin (Germany)	82–74	(Lithuania) Žalgiris	Berlin
20:00 (CET)	Scoring by quarter: 24–24, 20–6, 15–20, 23–24
	Pts: Thiemann 17; Rebs: Koumadje 6 Asts: Blatt 7 PIR: Thiemann 18	Boxscore	Pts: Cavanaugh 18; Rebs: Nebo 8 Asts: Strēlnieks 9 PIR: Nebo 26	Arena: Mercedes-Benz Arena; Attendance: 2,798; Referees: Oļegs Latiševs, Michele Rossi, Damir Javor

3 March 2022	Barcelona (Spain)	88–83	(France) AS Monaco	Barcelona
21:00 (CET)	Scoring by quarter: 20–20, 22–16, 24–26, 22–21
	Pts: Exum 22; Rebs: Calathes 6 Asts: Calathes 6 PIR: Exum 31	Boxscore	Pts: James 19; Rebs: Diallo 8 Asts: James 6 PIR: James 24	Arena: Palau Blaugrana; Attendance: 5,400; Referees: Borys Ryzhyk, Anne Panther, Luka Kardum

4 March 2022	Panathinaikos OPAP (Greece)	75–76	(Italy) A|X Armani Exchange Milan	Athens
20:00 (CET)	Scoring by quarter: 19–14, 17–26, 15–23, 24–13
	Pts: Nedović 19; Rebs: Papagiannis 7 Asts: Macon 8 PIR: Papagiannis 21	Boxscore	Pts: Delaney 15; Rebs: Hines 10; Asts: Rodríguez 9 PIR: Delaney 19	Arena: OAKA Altion; Attendance: 2,490; Referees: Sreten Radović, Carlos Cortés, Sašo Petek

4 March 2022	Bayern Munich (Germany)	88–98	(Greece) Olympiacos	Munich
20:45 (CET)	Scoring by quarter: 29–28, 24–22, 16–23, 19–25
	Pts: Rubit 18; Rebs: Lučić 8 Asts: Šiško 5 PIR: Rubit 27	Boxscore	Pts: Dorsey 25; Rebs: Fall 7 Asts: Sloukas 10; PIR: Dorsey 22	Arena: Audi Dome; Attendance: 3,046; Referees: Damir Javor, Emilio Pérez, Amit Balak

=== Round 29 ===
10 March 2022	Crvena zvezda mts (Serbia)	84–77	(Israel) Maccabi Tel Aviv	Belgrade
19:00 (CET)	Scoring by quarter: 24–10, 18–29, 23–21, 19–17
	Pts: Kalinić 15; Rebs: Kuzmić 8 Asts: Kalinić 5 PIR: Kalinić 22	Boxscore	Pts: Nunnally 24; Rebs: Žižić 6 Asts: Nunnally 4 PIR: Nunnally 31	Arena: Aleksandar Nikolić Hall; Attendance: 6,832; Referees: Borys Ryzhyk, Emilio Pérez, Rain Peerandi

10 March 2022	LDLC ASVEL (France)	69–72	(Spain) Bitci Baskonia	Villeurbanne
20:00 (CET)	Scoring by quarter: 14–18, 16–15, 17–18, 22–21
	Pts: Lacombe 16; Rebs: Wembanyama 7 Asts: Diot 5 PIR: Lacombe 16	Boxscore	Pts: A. Peters 17; Rebs: Fontecchio 9 Asts: Fontecchio 6 PIR: Costello 28	Arena: Astroballe; Attendance: 4,648; Referees: Matej Boltauzer, Tomislav Hordov, Uroš Obrknežević

10 March 2022	ALBA Berlin (Germany)	90–75	(Greece) Olympiacos	Berlin
20:00 (CET)	Scoring by quarter: 16–17, 21–13, 20–21, 33–24
	Pts: Lô 27; Rebs: da Silva 7 Asts: Blatt 7 PIR: Lô 34	Boxscore	Pts: Vezenkov 19; Rebs: Vezenkov 9 Asts: Sloukas 10; PIR: Vezenkov 29	Arena: Mercedes-Benz Arena; Attendance: 4,087; Referees: Ilija Belošević, Fernando Rocha, Eduard Udyanskyy

10 March 2022	Real Madrid (Spain)	92–88(OT)	(Italy) A|X Armani Exchange Milan	Madrid
20:45 (CET)	Scoring by quarter: 25–16, 16–25, 23–23, 17–17, Overtime: 11–7
	Pts: Llull 20; Rebs: Tavares 9 Asts: Fernández 3 PIR: Deck 22	Boxscore	Pts: Hall 21; Rebs: Melli 8 Asts: Delaney 6 PIR: Melli 24	Arena: WiZink Center; Attendance: 6,258; Referees: Oļegs Latiševs, Gytis Vilius, Joseph Bissang

11 March 2022	Žalgiris (Lithuania)	91–84	(Spain) Barcelona	Kaunas
19:00 (CET)	Scoring by quarter: 9–17, 26–18, 21–28, 35–21
	Pts: Lekavičius 22; Rebs: Ulanovas 9 Asts: Lekavičius 4 PIR: Ulanovas 33	Boxscore	Pts: Mirotić 26; Rebs: Mirotić 8 Asts: Calathes 9 PIR: Mirotić 26	Arena: Žalgirio arena Attendance: 12,686; Referees: Mehdi Difallah, Carmelo Paternicò, Seffi Shemmesh

11 March 2022	AS Monaco (France)	102–80	(Turkey) Anadolu Efes	Fontvieille
20:00 (CET)	Scoring by quarter: 25–19, 24–19, 26–18, 27–24
	Pts: James 27; Rebs: Bacon 6 Asts: Bacon 7 PIR: James 32	Boxscore	Pts: Micić 25; Rebs: Moerman 7 Asts: Micić 8 PIR: Micić 24	Arena: Salle Gaston Médecin; Attendance: 3,400; Referees: Daniel Hierrezuelo, Milan Nedović, Jakub Zamojski

=== Round 30 ===
17 March 2022	Žalgiris (Lithuania)	71–85	(Turkey) Anadolu Efes	Kaunas
19:00 (CET)	Scoring by quarter: 19–23, 11–18, 10–24, 31–20
	Pts: Cavanaugh 22; Rebs: Nebo 8 Asts: Ulanovas 5 PIR: Cavanaugh 25	Boxscore	Pts: Micić 22; Rebs: Anderson 7 Asts: Larkin 8 PIR: Micić 21	Arena: Žalgirio arena Attendance: 6,146; Referees: Ilija Belošević, Emilio Pérez, Josip Radojković

17 March 2022	Olympiacos (Greece)	101–73	(Greece) Panathinaikos OPAP	Piraeus
20:00 (CET)	Scoring by quarter: 38–13, 20–20, 20–18, 23–22
	Pts: Sloukas 16; Rebs: McKissic 8 Asts: Sloukas 9 PIR: Fall 25	Boxscore	Pts: Macon 23; Rebs: Papagiannis 9 Asts: Bochoridis 5 PIR: Papagiannis 26	Arena: Peace and Friendship Stadium; Attendance: 8,500; Referees: Robert Lottermoser, Miguel Ángel Pérez, Tomislav Hordov

17 March 2022	Real Madrid (Spain)	70–58	(France) LDLC ASVEL	Madrid
20:45 (CET)	Scoring by quarter: 20–14, 16–16, 15–17, 19–11
	Pts: Fernández 17; Rebs: Poirier 12; Asts: Heurtel 7 PIR: Fernández 24	Boxscore	Pts: Jones 17; Rebs: Jones 5 Asts: Jones 3 PIR: Jones 21	Arena: WiZink Center; Attendance: 4,326; Referees: Sreten Radović, Fernando Rocha, Rain Peerandi

18 March 2022	Bitci Baskonia (Spain)	85–68	(Germany) ALBA Berlin	Vitoria-Gasteiz
20:30 (CET)	Scoring by quarter: 21–19, 23–12, 20–29, 21–8
	Pts: Giedraitis 22; Rebs: Costello, Baldwin 7 Asts: Baldwin 10; PIR: Baldwin 29	Boxscore	Pts: Smith 16; Rebs: da Silva 7 Asts: Blatt 6 PIR: da Silva 16	Arena: Buesa Arena; Attendance: 6,448; Referees: Milivoje Jovčić, Milan Nedović, Jurgis Laurinavičius

18 March 2022	Barcelona (Spain)	82–70	(Serbia) Crvena zvezda mts	Barcelona
21:00 (CET)	Scoring by quarter: 22–15, 25–17, 18–19, 17–19
	Pts: Mirotić 19; Rebs: Davies 6 Asts: Calathes 7 PIR: Davies, Mirotić 20	Boxscore	Pts: Dobrić 17; Rebs: Mitrović 6 Asts: Wolters 4 PIR: Dobrić 16	Arena: Palau Blaugrana; Attendance: 5,728; Referees: Oļegs Latiševs, Joseph Bissang, Tomasz Trawicki

29 March 2022	A|X Armani Exchange Milan (Italy)	84–77	(Germany) Bayern Munich	Assago
20:30 (CEST)	Scoring by quarter: 15–19, 18–17, 23–14, 28–27
	Pts: Shields 22; Rebs: Melli 13; Asts: Melli 6 PIR: Melli 29	Boxscore	Pts: Lučić 26; Rebs: Rubit, Schilling 4 Asts: Šiško 6 PIR: Lučić 24	Arena: Mediolanum Forum; Attendance: 4,900; Referees: Matej Boltauzer, Amit Balak, Mehdi Difallah

=== Round 31 ===
22 March 2022	Anadolu Efes (Turkey)	93–90	(Spain) Real Madrid	Istanbul
18:30 (CET)	Scoring by quarter: 19–21, 25–30, 28–28, 21–11
	Pts: Micić 29; Rebs: Moerman 6 Asts: Micić 6 PIR: Micić 29	Boxscore	Pts: Deck 23; Rebs: Deck 10; Asts: Williams-Goss 7 PIR: Deck 31	Arena: Sinan Erdem Dome; Attendance: 15,092; Referees: Borys Ryzhyk, Uroš Nikolić, Damir Javor

22 March 2022	ALBA Berlin (Germany)	79–95	(Spain) Barcelona	Berlin
20:00 (CET)	Scoring by quarter: 13–21, 26–26, 19–26, 21–22
	Pts: da Silva 13; Rebs: Delow, da Silva 5 Asts: Delow 2 PIR: da Silva 16	Boxscore	Pts: Mirotić 18; Rebs: Davies 7 Asts: Calathes 8 PIR: Mirotić 22	Arena: Max-Schmeling-Halle; Attendance: 4,500; Referees: Sreten Radović, Elias Koromilas, Robert Vyklický

22 March 2022	Panathinaikos OPAP (Greece)	80–67	(Germany) Bayern Munich	Athens
20:00 (CET)	Scoring by quarter: 26–16, 16–19, 13–17, 25–15
	Pts: Macon 18; Rebs: Papagiannis 14; Asts: Kaselakis 5 PIR: Sant-Roos 29	Boxscore	Pts: Hilliard 15; Rebs: Rubit 8 Asts: Šiško 5 PIR: Rubit 20	Arena: OAKA Altion; Attendance: 1,402; Referees: Daniel Hierrezuelo, Milos Koljenšić, Marcin Kowalski

22 March 2022	Maccabi Tel Aviv (Israel)	75–58	(Italy) A|X Armani Exchange Milan	Tel Aviv
20:05 (CET)	Scoring by quarter: 23–11, 17–26, 16–9, 19–12
	Pts: Nunnally, Reynolds 14; Rebs: Žižić 7 Asts: Ziv 5 PIR: Žižić 20	Boxscore	Pts: Hall 11; Rebs: Melli 12; Asts: Shields 4 PIR: Melli 21	Arena: Menora Mivtachim Arena; Attendance: 9,309; Referees: Saša Pukl, Tomislav Hordov, Saulius Račys

23 March 2022	Žalgiris (Lithuania)	68–72	(France) LDLC ASVEL	Kaunas
19:00 (CET)	Scoring by quarter: 17–15, 15–18, 15–16, 21–23
	Pts: Ulanovas 15; Rebs: Nebo 6 Asts: Lekavičius, Ulanovas 5 PIR: Ulanovas 18	Boxscore	Pts: Okobo 21; Rebs: Wembanyama 5 Asts: Okobo 5 PIR: Okobo 26	Arena: Žalgirio arena Attendance: 5,289; Referees: Juan Carlos García, Anne Panther, Luka Kardum

23 March 2022	Bitci Baskonia (Spain)	77–62	(Turkey) Fenerbahçe Beko	Vitoria-Gasteiz
20:30 (CET)	Scoring by quarter: 20–19, 12–21, 22–13, 23–9
	Pts: Baldwin 24; Rebs: Enoch 9 Asts: Baldwin 6 PIR: Baldwin 25	Boxscore	Pts: Veselý 15; Rebs: Veselý 9 Asts: Gudurić 6 PIR: Veselý 23	Arena: Buesa Arena; Attendance: 7,563; Referees: Oļegs Latiševs, Mehdi Difallah, Sérgio Silva

23 March 2022	AS Monaco (France)	92–72	(Greece) Olympiacos	Fontvieille
21:00 (CET)	Scoring by quarter: 19–22, 29–9, 23–20, 21–21
	Pts: James 25; Rebs: Bacon, Thomas 5 Asts: Lee, Westermann 5 PIR: James 27	Boxscore	Pts: Fall, Vezenkov 18; Rebs: three players 6 Asts: Papanikolaou, Sloukas 4 PIR: Fall 29	Arena: Salle Gaston Médecin; Attendance: 3,400; Referees: Luigi Lamonica, Leandro Lezcano, Gentian Cici

=== Round 32 ===
24 March 2022	Anadolu Efes (Turkey)	77–83	(Italy) A|X Armani Exchange Milan	Istanbul
18:30 (CET)	Scoring by quarter: 30–21, 21–15, 10–26, 16–21
	Pts: Micić 27; Rebs: Moerman 9 Asts: Micić 5 PIR: Micić 28	Boxscore	Pts: Datome 14; Rebs: Melli 6 Asts: Rodríguez 8 PIR: Rodríguez 17	Arena: Sinan Erdem Dome; Attendance: 14,634; Referees: Miguel Ángel Pérez, Sreten Radović, Milivoje Jovčić

24 March 2022	Maccabi Tel Aviv (Israel)	75–74	(Spain) Real Madrid	Tel Aviv
20:05 (CET)	Scoring by quarter: 20–21, 21–23, 18–22, 16–8
	Pts: Evans 19; Rebs: Nunnally 8 Asts: Wilbekin, Nunnally 4 PIR: Evans 23	Boxscore	Pts: Yabusele 14; Rebs: Tavares 12; Asts: Heurtel 5 PIR: Poirier 20	Arena: Menora Mivtachim Arena; Referees: Robert Lottermoser, Carmelo Paternicò, Sašo Petek

25 March 2022	AS Monaco (France)	78–68	(Spain) Bitci Baskonia	Fontvieille
19:00 (CET)	Scoring by quarter: 18–19, 24–13, 19–17, 17–19
	Pts: Thomas 16; Rebs: Diallo 9 Asts: James 4 PIR: Diallo, Thomas 19	Boxscore	Pts: A. Peters 15; Rebs: Enoch, A. Peters 7 Asts: Baldwin 4 PIR: A. Peters 21	Arena: Salle Gaston Médecin; Attendance: 3,400; Referees: Damir Javor, Uroš Nikolić, Josip Radojković

25 March 2022	LDLC ASVEL (France)	80–94	(Greece) Olympiacos	Villeurbanne
20:00 (CET)	Scoring by quarter: 26–26, 17–21, 21–22, 16–25
	Pts: Strazel 16; Rebs: three players 4 Asts: Okobo 5 PIR: Strazel 19	Boxscore	Pts: Dorsey 21; Rebs: Vezenkov 10; Asts: Sloukas 9 PIR: Vezenkov 26	Arena: Astroballe; Attendance: 5,194; Referees: Oļegs Latiševs, Emilio Pérez, Igor Dragojević

25 March 2022	ALBA Berlin (Germany)	74–70	(Serbia) Crvena zvezda mts	Berlin
20:00 (CET)	Scoring by quarter: 24–15, 13–20, 21–22, 16–13
	Pts: Lô 22; Rebs: Sikma 9 Asts: Lô 4 PIR: Sikma, Lô 23	Boxscore	Pts: Wolters 18; Rebs: three players 4 Asts: Wolters, Marković 5 PIR: Wolters 20	Arena: Mercedes-Benz Arena; Attendance: 5,135; Referees: Luigi Lamonica, Mehdi Difallah, Aare Halliko

25 March 2022	Barcelona (Spain)	88–67	(Turkey) Fenerbahçe Beko	Barcelona
21:00 (CET)	Scoring by quarter: 25–21, 17–13, 28–15, 18–18
	Pts: Abrines, Mirotić 18; Rebs: Hayes, Calathes 5 Asts: Calathes 10; PIR: Mirotić 20	Boxscore	Pts: Gudurić 15; Rebs: Gudurić 5 Asts: Veselý 3 PIR: Gudurić, Akpınar 11	Arena: Palau Blaugrana; Attendance: 5,969; Referees: Matej Boltauzer, Fernando Rocha, Rain Peerandi

=== Round 33 ===
31 March 2022	Panathinaikos OPAP (Greece)	87–86	(Spain) Real Madrid	Athens
20:00 (CEST)	Scoring by quarter: 22–11, 19–21, 18–22, 28–32
	Pts: Papagiannis 18; Rebs: Papagiannis 10; Asts: Nedović 6 PIR: Papagiannis 30	Boxscore	Pts: Heurtel 18; Rebs: Tavares 12; Asts: Fernández 6 PIR: Tavares 26	Arena: OAKA Altion; Attendance: 2,682; Referees: Matej Boltauzer, Oļegs Latiševs, Emin Moğulkoç

31 March 2022	Maccabi Tel Aviv (Israel)	94–73	(France) LDLC ASVEL	Tel Aviv
20:05 (CEST)	Scoring by quarter: 21–18, 21–19, 28–21, 24–15
	Pts: Žižić 24; Rebs: Žižić 5 Asts: Evans 4 PIR: Žižić 30	Boxscore	Pts: Kahudi 12; Rebs: Jones 8 Asts: Jones 5 PIR: Kahudi, Gist 14	Arena: Menora Mivtachim Arena; Referees: Miguel Ángel Pérez, Miloš Koljenšić, Leandro Lezcano

31 March 2022	A|X Armani Exchange Milan (Italy)	63–72	(France) AS Monaco	Assago
20:45 (CEST)	Scoring by quarter: 17–16, 20–15, 6–20, 20–21
	Pts: Shields 22; Rebs: Hines 6 Asts: Delaney 6 PIR: Shields 26	Boxscore	Pts: James 19; Rebs: Hall, Diallo 8 Asts: James 7 PIR: Hall 27	Arena: Mediolanum Forum; Attendance: 5,800; Referees: Robert Lottermoser, Emilio Pérez, Milan Nedović, Benjamín Jiménez

1 April 2022	Anadolu Efes (Turkey)	87–77	(Germany) ALBA Berlin	Istanbul
19:30 (CEST)	Scoring by quarter: 16–24, 20–15, 26–18, 25–20
	Pts: Larkin 28; Rebs: Bryant 7 Asts: Larkin 8 PIR: Larkin 36	Boxscore	Pts: da Silva 20; Rebs: da Silva 5 Asts: Smith 6 PIR: da Silva 16	Arena: Sinan Erdem Dome; Attendance: 14,862; Referees: Daniel Hierrezuelo, Tomislav Hordov, Eduard Udyanskyy

1 April 2022	Olympiacos (Greece)	73–66	(Spain) Barcelona	Piraeus
20:00 (CEST)	Scoring by quarter: 13–19, 20–21, 18–8, 22–18
	Pts: McKissic 20; Rebs: Papanikolaou 5 Asts: Papanikolaou 3 PIR: McKissic 21	Boxscore	Pts: Şanlı 13; Rebs: Nnaji 7 Asts: Calathes 5 PIR: Šmits 11	Arena: Peace and Friendship Stadium; Attendance: 8,875; Referees: Ilija Belošević, Damir Javor, Anne Panther

1 April 2022	Bitci Baskonia (Spain)	96–79	(Lithuania) Žalgiris	Vitoria-Gasteiz
20:30 (CEST)	Scoring by quarter: 35–15, 22–25, 20–10, 19–29
	Pts: Enoch 18; Rebs: Sedekerskis 8 Asts: Granger 9 PIR: Giedraitis 24	Boxscore	Pts: Lekavičius 20; Rebs: Nebo 8 Asts: Ulanovas 6 PIR: Lekavičius 22	Arena: Buesa Arena; Attendance: 6,376; Referees: Luigi Lamonica, Fernando Rocha, Mario Majkić

1 April 2022	Bayern Munich (Germany)	82–57	(Serbia) Crvena zvezda mts	Munich
20:30 (CEST)	Scoring by quarter: 15−18, 27−15, 21−10, 19−14
	Pts: Rubit 22; Rebs: Hunter 7 Asts: Lučić 5 PIR: Rubit 25	Boxscore	Pts: Kalinić 12; Rebs: three players 5 Asts: Wolters, Davidovac 3 PIR: Kalinić 15	Arena: Audi Dome; Attendance: 6,041; Referees: Borys Ryzhyk, Seffi Shemmesh, Jurgis Laurinavičius

=== Round 34 ===
7 April 2022	Barcelona (Spain)	80–104	(Israel) Maccabi Tel Aviv	Barcelona
20:00 (CEST)	Scoring by quarter: 23–27, 23–30, 22–19, 12–28
	Pts: Abrines 17; Rebs: three players 4 Asts: Calathes 9 PIR: three players 14	Boxscore	Pts: Wilbekin 20; Rebs: Nunnally, Caloiaro 6 Asts: Evans 5 PIR: Nunnally 23	Arena: Palau Blaugrana; Attendance: 4,597; Referees: Luigi Lamonica, Borys Ryzhyk, Miloje Jovčić

7 April 2022	LDLC ASVEL (France)	80–81	(Italy) A|X Armani Exchange Milan	Villeurbanne
21:00 (CEST)	Scoring by quarter: 23–20, 18–20, 15–23, 24–18
	Pts: Lighty 28; Rebs: Fall, Wembanyama 6 Asts: three players 3 PIR: Lighty 29	Boxscore	Pts: Delaney 24; Rebs: Melli 8 Asts: Hall 6 PIR: Delaney 19	Arena: Astroballe; Attendance: 5,237; Referees: Daniel Hierrezuelo, Damir Javor, Josip Radojković

8 April 2022	Fenerbahçe Beko (Turkey)	59–62	(Greece) Panathinaikos OPAP	Istanbul
19:00 (CEST)	Scoring by quarter: 20–22, 12–16, 17–6, 10–18
	Pts: Veselý 20; Rebs: Veselý 7 Asts: Henry, Starks 4 PIR: Veselý 29	Boxscore	Pts: Papapetrou 21; Rebs: Papagiannis 12; Asts: Papapetrou 6 PIR: Papagiannis 31	Arena: Ülker Sports and Event Hall; Attendance: 2,577; Referees: Juan Carlos García, Carmelo Paternico, Uroš Nikolić

8 April 2022	Real Madrid (Spain)	88–97	(Germany) Bayern Munich	Madrid
20:45 (CEST)	Scoring by quarter: 24−17, 28−17, 23−25, 13−38
	Pts: four players 12; Rebs: Deck 5 Asts: Llull 5 PIR: Deck 17	Boxscore	Pts: Jaramaz 19; Rebs: Hunter 6 Asts: Šiško 3 PIR: Jaramaz 28	Arena: WiZink Center; Attendance: 6,796; Referees: Sreten Radović, Ilija Belošević, Rain Peerandi

8 April 2022	AS Monaco (France)	91–74	(Germany) ALBA Berlin	Fontvieille
21:00 (CEST)	Scoring by quarter: 26–22, 23–15, 19–17, 23–20
	Pts: Bacon 19; Rebs: Bacon 6 Asts: James 5 PIR: Motiejūnas 20	Boxscore	Pts: Koumadje 15; Rebs: Koumadje 9 Asts: Lô, Thiemann 5 PIR: Koumadje 20	Arena: Salle Gaston Médecin; Attendance: 3,400; Referees: Gytis Vilius, Jakub Zamojski, Jordi Aliaga

8 April 2022	Crvena zvezda mts (Serbia)	93–85	(Turkey) Anadolu Efes	Belgrade
21:00 (CEST)	Scoring by quarter: 21–29, 19–11, 25–22, 28–23
	Pts: Kalinić 16; Rebs: Kalinić 10; Asts: Kalinić 8 PIR: Kalinić 25	Boxscore	Pts: Larkin 16; Rebs: Singleton 8 Asts: Simon 8 PIR: Larkin 27	Arena: Aleksandar Nikolić Hall; Attendance: 5,734; Referees: Robert Lottermoser, Fernando Rocha, Arturas Sukys

== Average home attendances ==
As of 13 April 2022

Pos	Team	Total	High	Low	Average	Change
1	(Turkey) Anadolu Efes	159,794	15,092	5,218	11,413	n/a
2	(Israel) Maccabi Playtika Tel Aviv	116,080	10,316	0	8,291	n/a
3	(Lithuania) Žalgiris	106,830	12,686	4,863	7,630	n/a
4	(Spain) Bitci Baskonia	96,391	8,218	5,426	6,885	n/a
5	(Greece) Olympiacos	85,752	9,459	1,000	6,125	n/a
6	(Serbia) Crvena zvezda mts	84,597	7,893	4,247	6,042	n/a
7	(Spain) Real Madrid	79,419	9,131	3,087	5,672	n/a
8	(Turkey) Fenerbahçe Beko	77,640	12,133	1,892	5,545	n/a
9	(Spain) Barcelona	68,223	7,079	3,049	4,873	n/a
10	(Italy) A|X Armani Exchange Milan	62,417	7,324	2,250	4,458	n/a
11	(France) LDLC ASVEL	59,327	5,461	2,000	4,237	n/a
12	(Greece) Panathinaikos OPAP	54,364	11,852	951	3,883	n/a
13	(Germany) ALBA Berlin	53,552	6,176	1,600	3,825	n/a
14	(France) AS Monaco	48,410	4,013	2,151	3,457	n/a
15	(Germany) Bayern Munich	29,782	6,041	0	2,127	n/a
	League total	1,182,578	15,092	0	5,631	n/a

Source: Euroleague
