= 2019–20 EuroLeague regular season =

The 2019–20 EuroLeague Regular Season is played from 3 October 2019 to 10 April 2020. A total of 18 teams compete in the regular season to decide the eight places of the playoffs.

Times since 29 October 2019 up to 27 March 2020 are CET (UTC+1), times up to 25 October 2019 and since 2 April 2020 are CEST (UTC+2). It has been suspended due to COVID-19 outbreak.

== Format ==
In the regular season, teams play against each other home-and-away in a round-robin format. The eight first qualified teams will advance to the Playoffs, while the last ten qualified teams will be eliminated. The matchdays are from 3 October 2019 to 10 April 2020.

=== Tiebreakers ===
When all teams have played each other twice:

1. Best record in head-to-head games between all tied teams.
2. Higher cumulative score difference in head-to-head games between all tied teams.
3. Higher cumulative score difference for the entire regular season.
4. Higher total of points scored for the entire regular season.
5. Higher sum of quotients of points in favor and points against of each match played in the regular season.

If a tiebreaker does not resolve a tie completely, a new tiebreak process is initiated with only those teams that remain tied. All points scored in extra periods will not be counted in the standings, nor for any tie-break situation.

== League table ==
Pos	Team	Pld	W	L	PF	PA	PD
1	(Turkey) Anadolu Efes	28	24	4	2432	2166	+266
2	(Spain) Real Madrid	28	22	6	2371	2165	+206
3	(Spain) Barcelona	28	22	6	2357	2193	+164
4	(Russia) CSKA Moscow	28	19	9	2305	2125	+180
5	(Israel) Maccabi Tel Aviv	28	19	9	2291	2164	+127
6	(Greece) Panathinaikos OPAP	28	14	14	2392	2394	−2
7	(Russia) Khimki	28	13	15	2393	2380	+13
8	(Turkey) Fenerbahçe Beko	28	13	15	2153	2188	−35
9	(Lithuania) Žalgiris	28	12	16	2213	2142	+71
10	(Spain) Valencia Basket	28	12	16	2252	2273	−21
11	(Greece) Olympiacos	28	12	16	2243	2282	−39
12	(Italy) A|X Armani Exchange Milan	28	12	16	2163	2236	−73
13	(Spain) Kirolbet Baskonia	28	12	16	2059	2155	−96
14	(Serbia) Crvena zvezda mts	28	11	17	2079	2108	−29
15	(France) LDLC ASVEL	28	10	18	2073	2284	−211
16	(Germany) ALBA Berlin	28	9	19	2304	2423	−119
17	(Germany) Bayern Munich	28	8	20	2064	2281	−217
18	(Russia) Zenit Saint Petersburg	28	8	20	2055	2240	−185

Source: EuroLeague
Rules for classification: All points scored in extra period(s) were not counted in the standings, nor for any tie-break situation.

=== Positions by round ===
The table lists the positions of teams after completion of each round. In order to preserve chronological evolvements, any postponed matches are not included in the round at which they were originally scheduled, but added to the full round they were played immediately afterwards.

Team ╲ Round	1	2	3	4	5	6	7	8	9	10	11	12	13	14	15	16	17	18	19	20	21	22	23	24	25	26	27	28	29	30	31	32	33	34
Anadolu Efes	13	12	5	3	3	6	5	5	2	2	1	1	1	1	3	2	1	1	1	1	1	1	1	1	1	1	1	1						
Real Madrid	9	5	6	11	13	11	8	7	6	3	3	3	2	3	1	1	2	2	2	2	3	4	3	2	2	2	2	2						
Barcelona	6	2	1	2	1	2	1	3	1	1	2	2	3	2	2	3	3	3	5	5	4	3	2	3	3	3	3	3						
CSKA Moscow	1	1	2	1	2	1	3	2	5	6	5	5	5	5	5	5	5	5	4	4	2	2	4	4	4	5	5	4						
Maccabi Tel Aviv	12	14	15	10	7	4	4	1	4	5	4	4	4	4	4	4	4	4	3	3	5	5	5	5	5	4	4	5						
Panathinaikos OPAP	8	10	11	8	12	9	7	9	8	7	6	6	6	6	6	6	6	7	6	6	6	6	6	6	6	6	6	6						
Khimki	7	4	4	4	4	5	6	4	7	8	8	8	7	7	7	7	9	9	11	10	11	12	12	11	8	7	9	7						
Fenerbahçe Beko	10	15	16	16	17	17	14	15	17	16	13	12	13	15	15	15	14	12	10	11	9	9	7	9	10	9	7	8						
Žalgiris	14	16	14	9	10	8	11	11	12	14	17	17	17	17	18	17	16	16	15	16	15	13	11	13	12	10	8	9						
Valencia Basket	18	18	18	18	18	18	18	16	15	13	14	15	14	10	11	10	10	10	9	7	7	7	8	7	7	8	10	10						
Olympiacos	16	9	10	14	11	14	15	13	13	11	10	9	11	9	10	12	13	13	13	12	12	11	13	12	9	11	11	11						
A|X Armani Exchange Milan	15	13	7	5	5	3	2	6	3	4	7	7	8	8	8	8	7	6	7	8	8	8	9	8	11	12	12	12						
Kirolbet Baskonia	5	7	12	7	9	7	10	10	10	9	9	11	9	11	13	13	12	14	14	15	13	14	16	14	15	13	13	13						
Crvena zvezda mts	11	8	9	13	15	13	13	14	16	15	12	10	12	14	12	11	8	8	8	9	10	10	10	10	13	14	14	14						
LDLC ASVEL	3	3	8	12	8	12	9	8	9	10	11	13	10	13	9	9	11	11	12	13	14	15	14	15	16	16	15	15						
ALBA Berlin	2	6	13	15	16	16	17	17	14	17	15	14	16	16	16	16	17	17	16	14	16	16	15	16	14	15	16	16						
Bayern Munich	4	11	3	6	6	10	12	12	11	12	16	16	15	12	14	14	15	15	18	18	18	18	18	18	18	17	17	17						
Zenit Saint Petersburg	17	17	17	17	14	15	16	18	18	18	18	18	18	18	17	18	18	18	17	17	17	17	17	17	17	18	18	18						

Leader and qualification to playoffs
Qualification to playoffs

Updated to match(es) played on 6 March 2020. Source: EuroLeague

=== Results by round ===
The table lists the results of teams in each round.

Team ╲ Round	1	2	3	4	5	6	7	8	9	10	11	12	13	14	15	16	17	18	19	20	21	22	23	24	25	26	27	28	29	30	31	32	33	34
Anadolu Efes	L	W	W	W	W	L	W	W	W	W	W	W	W	W	L	W	W	W	W	W	W	W	W	W	W	W	L	W						
Real Madrid	W	W	L	L	L	W	W	W	W	W	W	W	W	W	W	W	W	W	L	L	L	W	W	W	W	W	W	W						
Barcelona	W	W	W	W	W	L	W	L	W	W	L	W	W	W	W	W	L	L	L	W	W	W	W	W	W	W	W	W						
CSKA Moscow	W	W	W	W	L	W	L	W	L	L	W	W	L	W	W	W	L	W	W	W	W	W	L	L	W	L	W	W						
Maccabi Tel Aviv	L	L	W	W	W	W	W	W	L	L	W	W	W	W	W	L	L	W	W	W	L	L	W	W	W	W	W	L						
Panathinaikos OPAP	W	L	L	W	L	W	W	L	W	W	W	W	L	W	L	L	W	L	W	W	W	L	L	W	L	L	L	L						
Khimki	W	W	L	W	W	L	W	W	L	L	L	L	W	L	W	L	L	L	L	W	L	L	L	W	W	W	L	W						
Fenerbahçe Beko	L	L	W	L	L	L	W	L	L	W	W	W	L	L	L	L	W	W	W	L	W	W	W	L	L	W	W	L						
Žalgiris	L	L	W	W	L	W	L	L	L	L	L	L	L	L	L	W	W	L	W	L	W	W	W	L	W	W	W	L						
Valencia Basket	L	L	L	L	L	W	L	W	W	W	L	L	W	W	L	W	W	L	W	W	L	W	L	W	L	L	L	L						
Olympiacos	L	W	L	L	W	L	L	W	L	W	W	L	L	W	L	L	L	W	L	W	L	W	L	W	W	L	W	L						
A|X Armani Exchange Milan	L	W	W	W	W	W	W	L	W	L	L	L	L	L	W	L	W	W	L	L	L	W	L	L	L	L	L	W						
Kirolbet Baskonia	W	L	L	W	L	W	L	L	W	W	L	L	W	L	L	L	W	L	L	L	W	L	L	W	L	W	W	W						
Crvena zvezda mts	L	W	L	L	L	W	L	L	L	W	W	W	L	L	W	W	W	W	L	L	L	L	W	L	L	L	L	W						
LDLC ASVEL	W	W	L	L	W	L	W	W	L	L	L	L	W	L	W	W	L	L	L	L	L	L	W	L	L	L	W	L						
ALBA Berlin	W	L	L	L	L	L	L	W	W	L	W	L	L	L	L	W	L	L	W	W	L	L	W	L	W	L	L	L						
Bayern Munich	W	L	W	L	W	L	L	L	W	L	L	L	W	W	L	L	L	L	L	L	W	L	L	L	L	W	L	L						
Zenit Saint Petersburg	L	L	W	L	W	L	L	L	L	L	L	W	L	L	W	L	L	W	W	L	W	L	L	L	L	L	L	W						

Updated to match(es) played on 06 March 2020. Source: EuroLeague
W = Win; L = Loss

== Matches ==
=== Round 1 ===
3 October 2019	Khimki (Russia)	89–83	(Israel) Maccabi Tel Aviv	Mytishchi
19:00	Scoring by quarter: 24–21, 24–19, 27–21, 14–22
	Pts: Shved 22; Rebs: Jerebko 7 Asts: Shved 6 PIR: Gill 22	Boxscore	Pts: Black 17; Rebs: Acy, Hunter 8 Asts: three players 3 PIR: Black 23	Arena: Mytishchi Arena; Attendance: 4,798; Referees: Sreten Radović, Benjamín Jiménez, Jurgis Laurinavicius

3 October 2019	Panathinaikos OPAP (Greece)	87–82	(Serbia) Crvena zvezda mts	Athens
20:00	Scoring by quarter: 14–17, 23–18, 29–18, 21–29
	Pts: Calathes 21; Rebs: Thomas 11; Asts: Calathes 7 PIR: Thomas 25	Boxscore	Pts: Gist 22; Rebs: Gist 7 Asts: Baron 6 PIR: Baron, Gist 17	Arena: O.A.K.A. Attendance: 10,133; Referees: Juan Carlos García González, Emin Moğulkoç, Gytis Vilius

3 October 2019	Bayern Munich (Germany)	78–64	(Italy) A|X Armani Exchange Milan	Munich
20:30	Scoring by quarter: 22–23, 20–11, 19–16, 17–14
	Pts: Lučić 18; Rebs: Monroe 10; Asts: Monroe 4 PIR: Lučić 26	Boxscore	Pts: Scola 17; Rebs: Tarczewski 8 Asts: Rodríguez 6 PIR: Scola 17	Arena: Audi Dome; Attendance: 4,270; Referees: Miguel Ángel Pérez Pérez, Fernando Rocha, Eduard Udyanskyy

3 October 2019	Real Madrid (Spain)	81–77	(Turkey) Fenerbahçe Beko	Madrid
21:00	Scoring by quarter: 30–21, 13–21, 21–13, 17–22
	Pts: Taylor 19; Rebs: Randolph, Tavares 5 Asts: Campazzo 8 PIR: Campazzo 24	Boxscore	Pts: de Colo 22; Rebs: Williams 10; Asts: Sloukas 5 PIR: de Colo, Williams 20	Arena: WiZink Center; Attendance: 10,434; Referees: Robert Lottermoser, Oļegs Latiševs, Mehdi Difallah

4 October 2019	Žalgiris (Lithuania)	58–70	(Spain) Kirolbet Baskonia	Kaunas
19:00	Scoring by quarter: 19–19, 11–18, 16–18, 12–15
	Pts: Grigonis, Lekavičius 10; Rebs: Hayes 7 Asts: Grigonis, Hayes 3 PIR: Ulanovas 20	Boxscore	Pts: Shields 19; Rebs: Henry, Polonara 6 Asts: Vildoza 5 PIR: Shields 21	Arena: Žalgirio Arena; Attendance: 15,151; Referees: Christos Christodoulou, Uroš Obrknežević, Sašo Petek

4 October 2019	Anadolu Efes (Turkey)	64–74	(Spain) Barcelona	Istanbul
19:30	Scoring by quarter: 14–19, 12–18, 20–12, 18–25
	Pts: Peters 16; Rebs: Dunston 9 Asts: Micić 5 PIR: Peters 19	Boxscore	Pts: Mirotić 24; Rebs: Hanga 6 Asts: Delaney 7 PIR: Mirotić 22	Arena: Sinan Erdem Dome; Attendance: 11,580; Referees: Borys Ryzhyk, Matej Boltauzer, Carmelo Paternicò

4 October 2019	ALBA Berlin (Germany)	85–65	(Russia) Zenit Saint Petersburg	Berlin
20:00	Scoring by quarter: 24–18, 23–13, 20–19, 18–15
	Pts: Nnoko 16; Rebs: Nnoko 7 Asts: Hermannsson 9 PIR: Nnoko 19	Boxscore	Pts: Thomas 14; Rebs: Thomas 8 Asts: Renfroe 7 PIR: Thomas 23	Arena: Mercedes-Benz Arena; Attendance: 10,117; Referees: Saša Pukl, Milivoje Jovčić, Emilio Pérez Pizarro

4 October 2019	LDLC ASVEL (France)	82–63	(Greece) Olympiacos	Villeurbanne
20:45	Scoring by quarter: 21–24, 19–9, 16–14, 26–16
	Pts: Lighty, Taylor 16; Rebs: Jekiri 10; Asts: Diot 5 PIR: Jekiri 25	Boxscore	Pts: Printezis 15; Rebs: Milutinov 10; Asts: Baldwin 3 PIR: Printezis 20	Arena: Astroballe; Attendance: 5,336; Referees: Daniel Hierrezuelo, Tomislav Hordov, Uroš Nikolić

4 October 2019	Valencia Basket (Spain)	71–96	(Russia) CSKA Moscow	Valencia
21:00	Scoring by quarter: 17–24, 21–26, 16–26, 17–20
	Pts: Tobey 14; Rebs: Tobey 6 Asts: Vives 5 PIR: Tobey 18	Boxscore	Pts: Hilliard 22; Rebs: Bolomboy, Hackett 6 Asts: Hackett, James 5 PIR: James 28	Arena: La Fonteta; Attendance: 7,390; Referees: Luigi Lamonica, Jakub Zamojski, Robert Vyklický

=== Round 2 ===
10 October 2019	CSKA Moscow (Russia)	79–68	(Germany) Bayern Munich	Moscow
19:00	Scoring by quarter: 22–18, 25–22, 13–10, 19–18
	Pts: Clyburn 15; Rebs: Voigtmann 12; Asts: James 5 PIR: Clyburn 18	Boxscore	Pts: Monroe 17; Rebs: Monroe 10; Asts: Đedović, Monroe 3 PIR: Monroe 27	Arena: Megasport Arena; Attendance: 6,072; Referees: Ilija Belošević, Saša Pukl, Boris Ryzhyk

10 October 2019	Crvena zvezda mts (Serbia)	68–56	(Turkey) Fenerbahçe Beko	Belgrade
19:00	Scoring by quarter: 15–16, 20–14, 16–13, 17–13
	Pts: L. Brown 13; Rebs: D. Brown, Gist 8 Asts: L. Brown 6 PIR: L. Brown 17	Boxscore	Pts: de Colo 19; Rebs: Williams 7 Asts: de Colo 4 PIR: de Colo 19	Arena: Štark Arena; Attendance: 16,879 (tentative); Referees: Luigi Lamonica, Piotr Pastusiak, Rain Peerandi

10 October 2019	LDLC ASVEL (France)	79–78	(Greece) Panathinaikos OPAP	Villeurbanne
20:45	Scoring by quarter: 22–22, 18–24, 10–17, 29–15
	Pts: Lighty 18; Rebs: Jekiri 12; Asts: Diot 6 PIR: Jekiri 25	Boxscore	Pts: Thomas 22; Rebs: Thomas 6 Asts: Calathes 8 PIR: Thomas 29	Arena: Astroballe; Attendance: 5,226; Referees: Robert Lottermoser, Milivoje Jovčić, Denis Hadžić

10 October 2019	Real Madrid (Spain)	86–85	(Israel) Maccabi Tel Aviv	Madrid
21:00	Scoring by quarter: 22–22, 28–22, 15–21, 21–20
	Pts: Mickey 16; Rebs: Mickey 11; Asts: Llull 5 PIR: Mickey 30	Boxscore	Pts: Wilbekin 22; Rebs: Hunter 7 Asts: Wilbekin 4 PIR: Wilbekin 27	Arena: WiZink Center; Attendance: 9,738; Referees: Damir Javor, Carmelo Paternicò, Uroš Obrknežević

11 October 2019	Zenit Saint Petersburg (Russia)	63–87	(Spain) Barcelona	Saint Petersburg
19:00	Scoring by quarter: 20–19, 20–24, 16–16, 7–28
	Pts: Voronov 10; Rebs: Iverson 8 Asts: Iverson 5 PIR: Iverson 15	Boxscore	Pts: Kuric 24; Rebs: Mirotić 10; Asts: Davies 6 PIR: Kuric 26	Arena: Sibur Arena; Attendance: 6,585; Referees: Christos Christodoulou, Fernando Rocha, Milija Vojinović

11 October 2019	Khimki (Russia)	79–76	(Spain) Kirolbet Baskonia	Mytishchi
19:00	Scoring by quarter: 27–17, 16–22, 19–16, 17–21
	Pts: Shved 21; Rebs: Evans 6 Asts: Shved 8 PIR: Evans 23	Boxscore	Pts: Shengelia 18; Rebs: Shengelia 10; Asts: three players 3 PIR: Henry 24	Arena: Mytishchi Arena; Attendance: 5,841; Referees: Saša Pukl, Boris Ryzhyk, Amit Balak

11 October 2019	Anadolu Efes (Turkey)	106–105(OT)	(Germany) ALBA Berlin	Istanbul
19:30	Scoring by quarter: 27–25, 16–15, 26–32, 26–23, Overtime: 11–10
	Pts: Larkin 26; Rebs: Larkin 5 Asts: Micić 13; PIR: Micić 32	Boxscore	Pts: Giedraitis 21; Rebs: Cavanaugh, Sikma 8 Asts: Hermannsson 11; PIR: Giedraitis 22	Arena: Sinan Erdem Dome; Attendance: 6,478 (tentative); Referees: Oļegs Latiševs, Tomislav Hordov, Jordi Aliaga

11 October 2019	Olympiacos (Greece)	89–63	(Spain) Valencia Basket	Piraeus
20:30	Scoring by quarter: 31–22, 23–8, 18–14, 17–19
	Pts: Milutinov, Spanoulis 17; Rebs: Milutinov 14; Asts: Spanoulis 6 PIR: Milutinov 29	Boxscore	Pts: Loyd 12; Rebs: Abalde, Dubljević 4 Asts: Van Rossom 4 PIR: Motum 12	Arena: Peace and Friendship Stadium; Attendance: 6,617; Referees: Matej Boltauzer, Petri Mäntylä, Joseph Bissang

11 October 2019	A|X Armani Exchange Milan (Italy)	85–81	(Lithuania) Žalgiris	Assago
20:45	Scoring by quarter: 23–7, 20–29, 21–23, 21–22
	Pts: Rodríguez 17; Rebs: Tarczewski 6 Asts: Rodríguez 6 PIR: Brooks, Rodríguez 24	Boxscore	Pts: Walkup 19; Rebs: Hayes 5 Asts: Lekavičius 4 PIR: Walkup 24	Arena: Mediolanum Forum; Attendance: 7,218; Referees: Juan Carlos García González, Mehdi Difallah, Ioannis Foufis

=== Round 3 ===
17 October 2019	CSKA Moscow (Russia)	99–86	(Russia) Khimki	Moscow
19:00	Scoring by quarter: 29–20, 25–24, 22–16, 23–26
	Pts: James 28; Rebs: Clyburn, Hines 6 Asts: James 5 PIR: James 26	Boxscore	Pts: Shved 25; Rebs: Booker 7 Asts: Bertāns 3 PIR: Booker 26	Arena: Megasport Arena; Attendance: 7,211; Referees: Oļegs Latiševs, Carlos Peruga, Arturas Šukys

17 October 2019	Žalgiris (Lithuania)	86–73	(Spain) Real Madrid	Kaunas
19:00	Scoring by quarter: 18–15, 20–19, 19–26, 29–13
	Pts: LeDay 26; Rebs: LeDay 9 Asts: Grigonis 5 PIR: LeDay 35	Boxscore	Pts: Randolph 15; Rebs: Mickey 6 Asts: Llull 4 PIR: Randolph 15	Arena: Žalgirio Arena; Attendance: 15,109; Referees: Sreten Radović, Robert Lottermoser, Seffi Shemmesh

17 October 2019	Fenerbahçe Beko (Turkey)	87–80	(Spain) Kirolbet Baskonia	Istanbul
19:45	Scoring by quarter: 22–22, 17–14, 24–22, 24–22
	Pts: de Colo 39; Rebs: Veselý 7 Asts: Sloukas, Veselý 5 PIR: de Colo 44	Boxscore	Pts: Shengelia 18; Rebs: Polonara, Shengelia 4 Asts: Vildoza 4 PIR: Shengelia 23	Arena: Ülker Sports and Event Hall; Attendance: 10,104; Referees: Matej Boltauzer, Carmelo Paternicò, Gytis Vilius

17 October 2019	Maccabi Tel Aviv (Israel)	84–69(OT)	(Serbia) Crvena zvezda mts	Tel Aviv
20:05	Scoring by quarter: 24–13, 15–17, 16–17, 12–20, Overtime: 17–2
	Pts: Wilbekin 16; Rebs: Casspi 8 Asts: Zoosman 4 PIR: Casspi 24	Boxscore	Pts: Perperoglou 18; Rebs: Faye, Ojo 6 Asts: Čović, Jenkins 4 PIR: Perperoglou 16	Arena: Menora Mivtachim Arena; Attendance: 10,403; Referees: Borys Ryzhyk, Robert Vyklický, Sinan İşgüder

17 October 2019	Bayern Munich (Germany)	104–63	(France) LDLC ASVEL	Munich
20:30	Scoring by quarter: 30–13, 27–22, 26–16, 21–12
	Pts: Lô 19; Rebs: Monroe, Nelson 6 Asts: Koponen 5 PIR: Lô 21	Boxscore	Pts: Noua 16; Rebs: Jekiri 7 Asts: Jackson 5 PIR: Diot 17	Arena: Audi Dome; Attendance: 3,566; Referees: Juan Carlos García González, Aare Halliko, Vasiliki Tsaroucha

17 October 2019	Panathinaikos OPAP (Greece)	78–79	(Italy) A|X Armani Exchange Milan	Athens
20:30	Scoring by quarter: 20–24, 18–14, 19–23, 21–18
	Pts: Calathes 23; Rebs: Mitoglou 10; Asts: Calathes, Rice 4 PIR: Wiley 27	Boxscore	Pts: Micov 18; Rebs: Scola 9 Asts: Rodríguez 5 PIR: Micov, Scola 18	Arena: O.A.K.A. Attendance: 10,093; Referees: Daniel Hierrezuelo, Tomasz Trawicki, Milan Nedović

18 October 2019	Olympiacos (Greece)	68–77(OT)	(Russia) Zenit Saint Petersburg	Piraeus
20:30	Scoring by quarter: 19–20, 17–18, 11–15, 17–11, Overtime: 4–13
	Pts: Milutinov, Punter 16; Rebs: Milutinov 16; Asts: Spanoulis 6 PIR: Milutinov 30	Boxscore	Pts: Ponitka 18; Rebs: Ayón 10; Asts: Ayón, Renfroe 3 PIR: Ponitka 24	Arena: Peace and Friendship Stadium; Attendance: 7,163; Referees: Ilija Belošević, Miloš Koljenšić, Sérgio Silva

18 October 2019	Barcelona (Spain)	103–84	(Germany) ALBA Berlin	Barcelona
21:00	Scoring by quarter: 19–25, 27–19, 26–17, 31–23
	Pts: Higgins 22; Rebs: Claver 7 Asts: Hanga 8 PIR: Higgins 27	Boxscore	Pts: Giedraitis 17; Rebs: Nnoko 7 Asts: Siva 8 PIR: Giedraitis 18	Arena: Palau Blaugrana; Attendance: 3,585; Referees: Damir Javor, Piotr Pastusiak, Hugues Thépénier

18 October 2019	Valencia Basket (Spain)	78–83	(Turkey) Anadolu Efes	Valencia
21:00	Scoring by quarter: 27–23, 19–16, 17–30, 15–14
	Pts: Dubljević 22; Rebs: Dubljević 7 Asts: Van Rossom 5 PIR: Dubljević 27	Boxscore	Pts: Simon 19; Rebs: Dunston, Peters 7 Asts: Micić 12; PIR: Micić 26	Arena: La Fonteta; Attendance: 7,205; Referees: Christos Christodoulou, Anne Panther, Michele Rossi

=== Round 4 ===
24 October 2019	Zenit Saint Petersburg (Russia)	79–89	(Greece) Panathinaikos OPAP	Saint Petersburg
19:00	Scoring by quarter: 20–22, 18–18, 22–25, 19–24
	Pts: Ponitka 16; Rebs: Ponitka 7 Asts: Albicy 5 PIR: Albicy 23	Boxscore	Pts: Fredette 22; Rebs: Papapetrou 11; Asts: Calathes 15; PIR: Calathes 24	Arena: Sibur Arena; Attendance: 3,817; Referees: Borys Ryzhyk, Petri Mäntylä, Anne Panther

24 October 2019	Anadolu Efes (Turkey)	76–60	(Spain) Real Madrid	Istanbul
19:30	Scoring by quarter: 15–11, 14–20, 27–19, 20–10
	Pts: Dunston, Simon 17; Rebs: Simon 9 Asts: Micić, Simon 4 PIR: Dunston 27	Boxscore	Pts: Llull 14; Rebs: Mickey 8 Asts: Campazzo 7 PIR: Fernández 15	Arena: Sinan Erdem Dome; Attendance: 15,167; Referees: Luigi Lamonica, Milivoje Jovčić, Milan Nedović

24 October 2019	Maccabi Tel Aviv (Israel)	76–63	(Spain) Valencia Basket	Tel Aviv
20:05	Scoring by quarter: 18–11, 15–17, 23–16, 20–19
	Pts: Wilbekin 14; Rebs: Hunter 8 Asts: Wolters 9 PIR: Casspi 19	Boxscore	Pts: Loyd 17; Rebs: Labeyrie 8 Asts: four players 2 PIR: Dubljević, San Emeterio 22	Arena: Menora Mivtachim Arena; Attendance: 10,511; Referees: Robert Lottermoser, Mario Majkić, Igor Dragojević

24 October 2019	Bayern Munich (Germany)	74–87	(Russia) Khimki	Munich
20:30	Scoring by quarter: 19–17, 18–27, 18–26, 19–17
	Pts: Monroe 18; Rebs: Lučić, Monroe 5 Asts: Monroe 4 PIR: Monroe 18	Boxscore	Pts: Shved 19; Rebs: Gill 6 Asts: Shved 9 PIR: Shved 21	Arena: Audi Dome; Attendance: 3,524; Referees: Daniel Hierrezuelo, Tomislav Hordov, Ingus Baumanis

24 October 2019	Crvena zvezda mts (Serbia)	65–73	(Spain) Barcelona	Belgrade
21:00	Scoring by quarter: 16–12, 20–21, 13–24, 16–16
	Pts: Gist 10; Rebs: three players 4 Asts: L. Brown 3 PIR: Faye 10	Boxscore	Pts: Mirotić 21; Rebs: Davies, Mirotić 6 Asts: Higgins 5 PIR: Davies 24	Arena: Aleksandar Nikolić Hall; Attendance: 6,384; Referees: Oļegs Latiševs, Joseph Bissang, Marcin Kowalski

25 October 2019	Žalgiris (Lithuania)	70–56	(France) LDLC ASVEL	Kaunas
19:00	Scoring by quarter: 14–20, 19–8, 22–17, 15–11
	Pts: LeDay 13; Rebs: LeDay 8 Asts: Walkup 4 PIR: Walkup 19	Boxscore	Pts: Jekiri 10; Rebs: Jekiri 10; Asts: Jackson 4 PIR: Jekiri 17	Arena: Žalgirio Arena; Attendance: 14,828; Referees: Matej Boltauzer, Spiros Gkontas, Jordi Aliaga

25 October 2019	ALBA Berlin (Germany)	66–82	(Russia) CSKA Moscow	Berlin
20:00	Scoring by quarter: 15–17, 19–22, 8–22, 24–21
	Pts: three players 11; Rebs: Nnoko 7 Asts: Siva 11; PIR: Giffey 15	Boxscore	Pts: James 22; Rebs: Kurbanov, Voigtmann 8 Asts: James 5 PIR: James 23	Arena: Mercedes-Benz Arena; Attendance: 13,212; Referees: Sreten Radović, Carlos Cortés, Jurgis Laurinavičius

25 October 2019	A|X Armani Exchange Milan (Italy)	87–74	(Turkey) Fenerbahçe Beko	Assago
20:45	Scoring by quarter: 20–11, 21–18, 25–26, 21–19
	Pts: Rodríguez 22; Rebs: Tarczewski 9 Asts: Micov 7 PIR: Gudaitis 25	Boxscore	Pts: Lauvergne, Veselý 14; Rebs: Lauvergne 8 Asts: Sloukas 7 PIR: Veselý 21	Arena: Mediolanum Forum; Attendance: 9,486; Referees: Christos Christodoulou, Saša Pukl, Uroš Nikolić

25 October 2019	Kirolbet Baskonia (Spain)	82–66	(Greece) Olympiacos	Vitoria-Gasteiz
21:00	Scoring by quarter: 23–21, 18–15, 17–13, 24–17
	Pts: Shengelia 25; Rebs: Fall 16; Asts: Vildoza 6 PIR: Shengelia 28	Boxscore	Pts: Paul 15; Rebs: Milutinov 10; Asts: Cherry, Spanoulis 5 PIR: Milutinov 20	Arena: Buesa Arena; Attendance: 10,584; Referees: Damir Javor, Mehdi Difallah, Michele Rossi

=== Round 5 ===
29 October 2019	Khimki (Russia)	103–86	(Greece) Panathinaikos OPAP	Mytishchi
18:00	Scoring by quarter: 25–29, 25–26, 27–18, 26–13
	Pts: Shved 26; Rebs: Evans 11; Asts: Shved 7 PIR: Shved 28	Boxscore	Pts: Fredette 16; Rebs: Mitoglou 5 Asts: Calathes 11; PIR: Calathes, Fredette 15	Arena: Mytishchi Arena; Attendance: 6,012; Referees: Luigi Lamonica, Joseph Bissang, Marcin Kowalski

29 October 2019	Anadolu Efes (Turkey)	85–70	(Serbia) Crvena zvezda mts	Istanbul
18:30	Scoring by quarter: 21–9, 17–17, 18–25, 29–19
	Pts: Micić 26; Rebs: Peters 7 Asts: Micić, Simon 5 PIR: Micić 29	Boxscore	Pts: L. Brown 18; Rebs: Gist 7 Asts: L. Brown 5 PIR: L. Brown 19	Arena: Sinan Erdem Dome; Attendance: 12,466; Referees: Robert Lottermoser, Jakub Zamojski, Petros Papapetrou

29 October 2019	ALBA Berlin (Germany)	78–81	(Italy) A|X Armani Exchange Milan	Berlin
20:00	Scoring by quarter: 18–17, 15–9, 17–27, 28–28
	Pts: Siva 20; Rebs: three players 6 Asts: Hermannsson 5 PIR: Giedraitis 20	Boxscore	Pts: Rodríguez 17; Rebs: Tarczewski 9 Asts: Micov, Rodríguez 4 PIR: Rodríguez 19	Arena: Mercedes-Benz Arena; Attendance: 9,351; Referees: Boris Ryzhyk, Emilio Pérez Pizarro, Josip Radojković

29 October 2019	LDLC ASVEL (France)	66–63	(Spain) Kirolbet Baskonia	Villeurbanne
20:45	Scoring by quarter: 16–23, 14–13, 18–13, 18–14
	Pts: Jekiri 16; Rebs: Jekiri 11; Asts: Lighty 4 PIR: Jekiri 25	Boxscore	Pts: Shengelia 17; Rebs: Fall, Shengelia 7 Asts: Vildoza 4 PIR: Shengelia 25	Arena: Astroballe; Attendance: 5,516; Referees: Christos Christodoulou, Fernando Rocha, Ersan Kartal

30 October 2019	CSKA Moscow (Russia)	79–84	(Greece) Olympiacos	Moscow
18:00	Scoring by quarter: 24–18, 15–25, 21–21, 19–20
	Pts: James 22; Rebs: Vorontsevich 7 Asts: James 6 PIR: James 24	Boxscore	Pts: Paul 20; Rebs: Milutinov 8 Asts: Paul 3 PIR: Paul 24	Arena: Megasport Arena; Attendance: 8,462; Referees: Luigi Lamonica, Juan Carlos García González, Gytis Vilius

30 October 2019	Žalgiris (Lithuania)	70–82(OT)	(Russia) Zenit Saint Petersburg	Kaunas
19:00	Scoring by quarter: 18–14, 10–14, 15–16, 19–18, Overtime: 8–20
	Pts: LeDay, Ulanovas 12; Rebs: Walkup 7 Asts: LeDay 10; PIR: LeDay 20	Boxscore	Pts: Ponitka 19; Rebs: Ponitka 7 Asts: Ayón 5 PIR: Ponitka 27	Arena: Žalgirio Arena; Attendance: 13,189; Referees: Miguel Ángel Pérez Pérez, Carmelo Paternicò, Tomasz Trawicki

30 October 2019	Maccabi Tel Aviv (Israel)	67–55	(Turkey) Fenerbahçe Beko	Tel Aviv
20:05	Scoring by quarter: 12–6, 29–15, 11–20, 15–14
	Pts: Casspi 13; Rebs: Black 15; Asts: Casspi 4 PIR: Black 21	Boxscore	Pts: de Colo 18; Rebs: Datome 8 Asts: Dixon 4 PIR: Dixon 18	Arena: Menora Mivtachim Arena; Attendance: 10,682; Referees: Daniel Hierrezuelo, Anne Panther, Sérgio Silva

30 October 2019	Bayern Munich (Germany)	95–86	(Spain) Real Madrid	Munich
20:30	Scoring by quarter: 22–20, 19–18, 26–19, 28–29
	Pts: Monroe 18; Rebs: Lučić 6 Asts: Lô 7 PIR: Barthel 24	Boxscore	Pts: Randolph 17; Rebs: Randolph 10; Asts: Campazzo 6 PIR: Garuba, Randolph 20	Arena: Audi Dome; Attendance: 5,763; Referees: Matej Boltauzer, Spiros Gkontas, Semen Ovinov

30 October 2019	Barcelona (Spain)	83–77	(Spain) Valencia Basket	Barcelona
22:00	Scoring by quarter: 21–19, 23–22, 18–24, 21–12
	Pts: Higgins 20; Rebs: Davies, Mirotić 7 Asts: Hanga 6 PIR: Mirotić 23	Boxscore	Pts: Loyd 17; Rebs: Dubljević 10; Asts: Colom 3 PIR: Dubljević 24	Arena: Palau Blaugrana; Attendance: 5,734; Referees: Saša Pukl, Mehdi Difallah, Ioannis Foufis

=== Round 6 ===
31 October 2019	Crvena zvezda mts (Serbia)	90–78	(Russia) Khimki	Belgrade
19:00	Scoring by quarter: 28–22, 22–19, 30–15, 10–22
	Pts: Simanić 18; Rebs: three players 5 Asts: L. Brown 7 PIR: three players 17	Boxscore	Pts: Shved 14; Rebs: Gill 11; Asts: Karasev, Shved 4 PIR: Gill 25	Arena: Aleksandar Nikolić Hall; Attendance: 5,432; Referees: Fernando Rocha, Emilio Pérez Pizarro, Michele Rossi

31 October 2019	Panathinaikos OPAP (Greece)	86–70	(Turkey) Anadolu Efes	Athens
20:00	Scoring by quarter: 24–19, 18–19, 21–16, 23–16
	Pts: Rice 18; Rebs: Johnson, Papagiannis 7 Asts: Calathes 7 PIR: Rice 23	Boxscore	Pts: Larkin 28; Rebs: Singleton 11; Asts: three players 3 PIR: Larkin 30	Arena: O.A.K.A. Attendance: 8,304; Referees: Sreten Radović, Damir Javor, Mehdi Difallah

1 November 2019	Zenit Saint Petersburg (Russia)	70–87	(Russia) CSKA Moscow	Saint Petersburg
18:00	Scoring by quarter: 15–26, 22–22, 22–13, 11–26
	Pts: Ayón 20; Rebs: Ayón 8 Asts: Hollins, Renfroe 4 PIR: Ayón 24	Boxscore	Pts: James 16; Rebs: Voigtmann 7 Asts: Strēlnieks 5 PIR: Voigtmann 24	Arena: Sibur Arena; Attendance: 5,162; Referees: Daniel Hierrezuelo, Tomislav Hordov, Marcin Kowalski

1 November 2019	Fenerbahçe Beko (Turkey)	76–79	(Lithuania) Žalgiris	Istanbul
18:45	Scoring by quarter: 17–17, 23–16, 19–19, 17–27
	Pts: de Colo 29; Rebs: Veselý 6 Asts: Sloukas 9 PIR: de Colo 28	Boxscore	Pts: Grigonis 19; Rebs: Jankūnas 6 Asts: Walkup 5 PIR: Grigonis 23	Arena: Ülker Sports and Event Hall; Attendance: 10,378; Referees: Robert Lottermoser, Juan Carlos García González, Milivoje Jovčić

1 November 2019	Valencia Basket (Spain)	81–72	(France) LDLC ASVEL	Valencia
19:00	Scoring by quarter: 16–18, 19–18, 21–16, 25–20
	Pts: Dubljević 13; Rebs: Dubljević 8 Asts: Colom 6 PIR: Vives 17	Boxscore	Pts: Jean-Charles 20; Rebs: Jekiri 9 Asts: Diot 6 PIR: Jean-Charles 24	Arena: La Fonteta; Attendance: 7,399; Referees: Borys Ryzhyk, Gytis Vilius, Marko Juras

1 November 2019	A|X Armani Exchange Milan (Italy)	83–70	(Spain) Barcelona	Assago
20:00	Scoring by quarter: 15–20, 15–17, 22–21, 31–12
	Pts: Rodríguez 17; Rebs: Scola 9 Asts: Rodríguez 7 PIR: Micov, Scola 22	Boxscore	Pts: Davies 15; Rebs: three players 5 Asts: Delaney 4 PIR: Davies 14	Arena: Mediolanum Forum; Attendance: 12,064; Referees: Ilija Belošević, Emin Moğulkoç, Joseph Bissang

1 November 2019	Olympiacos (Greece)	65–90	(Israel) Maccabi Tel Aviv	Piraeus
20:30	Scoring by quarter: 21–24, 19–21, 16–23, 9–22
	Pts: Printezis 16; Rebs: Milutinov 7 Asts: Spanoulis 5 PIR: Printezis 14	Boxscore	Pts: Dorsey, Wilbekin 19; Rebs: Acy 8 Asts: Casspi, Wolters 4 PIR: Dorsey 23	Arena: Peace and Friendship Stadium; Attendance: 7,863; Referees: Miguel Ángel Pérez Pérez, Matej Boltauzer, Uroš Obrknežević

1 November 2019	Kirolbet Baskonia (Spain)	93–60	(Germany) Bayern Munich	Vitoria-Gasteiz
21:00	Scoring by quarter: 29–10, 23–19, 14–18, 27–13
	Pts: Shengelia 19; Rebs: Fall 8 Asts: Vildoza 6 PIR: Shengelia 28	Boxscore	Pts: Monroe 18; Rebs: Zipser 8 Asts: Flaccadori, Radošević 2 PIR: Monroe 19	Arena: Buesa Arena; Attendance: 10,758; Referees: Luigi Lamonica, Oļegs Latiševs, Tomasz Trawicki

1 November 2019	Real Madrid (Spain)	85–71	(Germany) ALBA Berlin	Madrid
21:00	Scoring by quarter: 28–14, 14–24, 22–18, 21–15
	Pts: three players 12; Rebs: Tavares 8 Asts: Campazzo 8 PIR: Tavares 20	Boxscore	Pts: Hermannsson 13; Rebs: Nnoko, Sikma 6 Asts: Sikma 4 PIR: Thiemann 15	Arena: WiZink Center; Attendance: 10,289; Referees: Christos Christodoulou, Sérgio Silva, Robert Vyklický

=== Round 7 ===
7 November 2019	Zenit Saint Petersburg (Russia)	73–87	(Russia) Khimki	Saint Petersburg
18:00	Scoring by quarter: 28–28, 15–24, 17–16, 13–19
	Pts: Hollins 25; Rebs: three players 5 Asts: Ayón, Renfroe 4 PIR: Hollins 21	Boxscore	Pts: Booker 20; Rebs: Evans 8 Asts: Shved 5 PIR: Booker 24	Arena: Sibur Arena; Attendance: 3,575; Referees: Juan Carlos García González, Jakub Zamojski, Aare Halliko

7 November 2019	Crvena zvezda mts (Serbia)	60–75	(Spain) Real Madrid	Belgrade
19:00	Scoring by quarter: 9–12, 18–21, 25–16, 8–26
	Pts: Baron 17; Rebs: L. Brown 6 Asts: L. Brown 5 PIR: L. Brown 24	Boxscore	Pts: Llull 16; Rebs: Tavares 9 Asts: Llull 5 PIR: Tavares 21	Arena: Štark Arena; Attendance: 16,457; Referees: Carmelo Paternicò, Emin Moğulkoç, Gytis Vilius

7 November 2019	Olympiacos (Greece)	67–86	(Turkey) Anadolu Efes	Piraeus
20:00	Scoring by quarter: 24–21, 11–32, 23–14, 9–19
	Pts: Paul 15; Rebs: Milutinov 13; Asts: Koniaris 4 PIR: Milutinov 22	Boxscore	Pts: Micić 27; Rebs: Dunston 8 Asts: Micić 5 PIR: Larkin 31	Arena: Peace and Friendship Stadium; Attendance: 5,657; Referees: Daniel Hierrezuelo, Piotr Pastusiak, Eduard Udyanskyy

7 November 2019	Maccabi Tel Aviv (Israel)	104–78	(Germany) ALBA Berlin	Tel Aviv
20:05	Scoring by quarter: 21–19, 31–18, 31–18, 21–23
	Pts: DiBartolomeo 19; Rebs: three players 5 Asts: Casspi, Wilbekin 3 PIR: DiBartolomeo 24	Boxscore	Pts: Cavanaugh, Siva 14; Rebs: Sikma 6 Asts: Siva 8 PIR: Siva 18	Arena: Menora Mivtachim Arena; Attendance: 10,441; Referees: Luigi Lamonica, Ilija Belošević, Renaud Geller

7 November 2019	A|X Armani Exchange Milan (Italy)	81–74	(Spain) Kirolbet Baskonia	Assago
20:45	Scoring by quarter: 14–19, 26–15, 16–19, 25–21
	Pts: Della Valle 15; Rebs: Tarczewski 7 Asts: Roll 4 PIR: Della Valle, Roll 19	Boxscore	Pts: Stauskas 15; Rebs: Shengelia 9 Asts: Henry 5 PIR: Shengelia 18	Arena: Mediolanum Forum; Attendance: 6,732; Referees: Robert Lottermoser, Matej Boltauzer, Hugues Thépénier

8 November 2019	Fenerbahçe Beko (Turkey)	90–82	(Germany) Bayern Munich	Istanbul
18:45	Scoring by quarter: 18–15, 22–24, 21–23, 29–20
	Pts: Williams 19; Rebs: Veselý 4 Asts: Kalinić 5 PIR: de Colo 24	Boxscore	Pts: Monroe 19; Rebs: Lučić, Monroe 7 Asts: Lô 6 PIR: Monroe 26	Arena: Ülker Sports and Event Hall; Attendance: 8,871; Referees: Sreten Radović, Ioannis Foufis, Carlos Peruga

8 November 2019	Žalgiris (Lithuania)	86–93	(Spain) Barcelona	Kaunas
19:00	Scoring by quarter: 20–23, 20–24, 21–19, 25–27
	Pts: LeDay 16; Rebs: Hayes 5 Asts: Walkup 5 PIR: Walkup 18	Boxscore	Pts: Higgins 27; Rebs: Davies, Mirotić 6 Asts: Delaney 7 PIR: Higgins 33	Arena: Žalgirio Arena; Attendance: 15,342; Referees: Borys Ryzhyk, Fernando Rocha, Sašo Petek

8 November 2019	Panathinaikos OPAP (Greece)	91–80	(Spain) Valencia Basket	Athens
20:30	Scoring by quarter: 26–18, 19–17, 23–29, 23–16
	Pts: Thomas 19; Rebs: Calathes 12; Asts: Calathes 9 PIR: Thomas 23	Boxscore	Pts: Loyd 27; Rebs: Dubljević, Loyd 5 Asts: Loyd 8 PIR: Loyd 41	Arena: O.A.K.A. Attendance: 9,130; Referees: Oļegs Latiševs, Milivoje Jovčić, Miloš Koljenšić

8 November 2019	LDLC ASVEL (France)	67–66	(Russia) CSKA Moscow	Villeurbanne
20:45	Scoring by quarter: 12–17, 21–13, 17–22, 17–14
	Pts: Lomažs 15; Rebs: Jekiri 14; Asts: Taylor 7 PIR: Taylor 18	Boxscore	Pts: James 14; Rebs: Voigtmann 9 Asts: James 4 PIR: Vorontsevich 16	Arena: Astroballe; Attendance: 5,522; Referees: Saša Pukl, Anne Panther, Saulius Racys

=== Round 8 ===
14 November 2019	Khimki (Russia)	87–79	(Italy) A|X Armani Exchange Milan	Mytishchi
18:00	Scoring by quarter: 22–25, 25–26, 18–14, 22–14
	Pts: Shved 24; Rebs: Booker 6 Asts: Shved 7 PIR: Shved 23	Boxscore	Pts: Scola 16; Rebs: Scola 8 Asts: Nedović 7 PIR: Rodríguez 21	Arena: Mytishchi Arena; Attendance: 6,781; Referees: Sreten Radović, Oļegs Latiševs, Anne Panther

14 November 2019	Anadolu Efes (Turkey)	90–88	(Russia) Zenit Saint Petersburg	Istanbul
18:30	Scoring by quarter: 21–14, 21–16, 27–20, 21–38
	Pts: Micić 24; Rebs: Anderson 8 Asts: Micić 6 PIR: Micić 31	Boxscore	Pts: Hollins 26; Rebs: Ponitka 6 Asts: Renfroe 10; PIR: Ayón 22	Arena: Sinan Erdem Dome; Attendance: 10,563; Referees: Matej Boltauzer, Milivoje Jovčić, Mykola Ambrosov

14 November 2019	Panathinaikos OPAP (Greece)	105–106(OT)	(Germany) ALBA Berlin	Athens
20:00	Scoring by quarter: 31–31, 18–27, 20–16, 19–14, Overtime: 17–18
	Pts: Papapetrou 39; Rebs: Thomas 9 Asts: Calathes 10; PIR: Papapetrou 41	Boxscore	Pts: Hermannsson 20; Rebs: Sikma 10; Asts: Hermannsson 10; PIR: Sikma 26	Arena: O.A.K.A. Attendance: 8,098; Referees: Saša Pukl, Carmelo Paternicò, Emin Moğulkoç

14 November 2019	Kirolbet Baskonia (Spain)	83–113	(Israel) Maccabi Tel Aviv	Vitoria-Gasteiz
21:00	Scoring by quarter: 21–28, 11–27, 26–31, 25–27
	Pts: Shengelia 31; Rebs: Shengelia 8 Asts: Henry, Vildoza 5 PIR: Shengelia 32	Boxscore	Pts: Wilbekin 20; Rebs: Hunter 9 Asts: DiBartolomeo, Wilbekin 6 PIR: Wilbekin 25	Arena: Buesa Arena; Attendance: 10,489; Referees: Borys Ryzhyk, Milan Nedović, Uroš Nikolić

14 November 2019	Real Madrid (Spain)	86–76	(Spain) Barcelona	Madrid
21:00	Scoring by quarter: 32–14, 16–36, 23–14, 15–12
	Pts: Randolph 16; Rebs: Randolph 7 Asts: Campazzo 6 PIR: Randolph 20	Boxscore	Pts: Mirotić 19; Rebs: Higgins 6 Asts: Delaney 4 PIR: Kuric, Tomić 16	Arena: WiZink Center; Attendance: 12,729; Referees: Luigi Lamonica, Damir Javor, Tomasz Trawicki

15 November 2019	CSKA Moscow (Russia)	88–70	(Turkey) Fenerbahçe Beko	Moscow
18:00	Scoring by quarter: 21–17, 18–17, 25–15, 24–21
	Pts: James 31; Rebs: Vorontsevich 10; Asts: Hackett, James 4 PIR: James 38	Boxscore	Pts: Sloukas 20; Rebs: Kalinić 10; Asts: Sloukas 6 PIR: Sloukas 22	Arena: Universal Sports Hall CSKA; Attendance: 5,112; Referees: Miguel Ángel Pérez Pérez, Fernando Rocha, Mehdi Difallah

15 November 2019	Crvena zvezda mts (Serbia)	72–74(OT)	(France) LDLC ASVEL	Belgrade
19:00	Scoring by quarter: 16–14, 20–18, 18–15, 11–18, Overtime: 7–9
	Pts: Baron 16; Rebs: Davidovac, Gist 7 Asts: L. Brown 4 PIR: Davidovac 19	Boxscore	Pts: Jean-Charles 20; Rebs: Jekiri 19; Asts: Lighty 6 PIR: Jekiri 29	Arena: Štark Arena; Attendance: 10,894; Referees: Juan Carlos García González, Piotr Pastusiak, Rain Peerandi

15 November 2019	Olympiacos (Greece)	83–74	(Lithuania) Žalgiris	Piraeus
20:30	Scoring by quarter: 19–18, 18–21, 23–16, 23–19
	Pts: Spanoulis 16; Rebs: Milutinov 8 Asts: Spanoulis 7 PIR: Milutinov 27	Boxscore	Pts: Landale 23; Rebs: three players 4 Asts: Walkup 5 PIR: Landale 23	Arena: Peace and Friendship Stadium; Attendance: 5,516; Referees: Ilija Belošević, Carlos Cortés, Tomislav Hordov

15 November 2019	Valencia Basket (Spain)	82–56	(Germany) Bayern Munich	Valencia
21:00	Scoring by quarter: 20–16, 19–13, 20–18, 23–9
	Pts: Marinković 19; Rebs: Dubljević 7 Asts: Colom, Loyd 4 PIR: Motum 18	Boxscore	Pts: Lučić 14; Rebs: Radošević 4 Asts: three players 2 PIR: Lučić 13	Arena: La Fonteta; Attendance: 7,166; Referees: Christos Christodoulou, Sérgio Silva, Michele Rossi

=== Round 9 ===
19 November 2019	Žalgiris (Lithuania)	85–86	(Greece) Panathinaikos OPAP	Kaunas
19:00	Scoring by quarter: 16–19, 17–22, 20–23, 32–22
	Pts: LeDay 15; Rebs: Landale 8 Asts: Lekavičius, Walkup 5 PIR: Ulanovas 15	Boxscore	Pts: Calathes 19; Rebs: Calathes, Papapetrou 5 Asts: Calathes 12; PIR: Calathes 32	Arena: Žalgirio Arena; Attendance: 14,901; Referees: Miguel Ángel Pérez Pérez, Milan Nedović, Tomasz Trawicki

19 November 2019	ALBA Berlin (Germany)	93–80	(Serbia) Crvena zvezda mts	Berlin
20:00	Scoring by quarter: 21–15, 25–19, 21–20, 26–26
	Pts: Giedraitis 22; Rebs: Sikma 9 Asts: Hermannsson, Sikma 4 PIR: Sikma 32	Boxscore	Pts: Ojo 12; Rebs: Jovanović, Ojo 6 Asts: Čović 8 PIR: Čović, Ojo 16	Arena: Mercedes-Benz Arena; Attendance: 8,076; Referees: Borys Ryzhyk, Aare Halliko, Sebastien Clivaz

19 November 2019	Bayern Munich (Germany)	85–82	(Greece) Olympiacos	Munich
20:30	Scoring by quarter: 23–17, 20–27, 12–19, 30–19
	Pts: Lô 19; Rebs: Monroe 7 Asts: Lô 7 PIR: Lô 25	Boxscore	Pts: Baldwin 19; Rebs: Rubit 6 Asts: Rochestie 6 PIR: Baldwin 17	Arena: Audi Dome; Attendance: 4,461; Referees: Juan Carlos García González, Milivoje Jovčić, Hugues Thépénier

19 November 2019	LDLC ASVEL (France)	84–90	(Turkey) Anadolu Efes	Villeurbanne
20:45	Scoring by quarter: 22–25, 23–21, 21–24, 18–20
	Pts: three players 12; Rebs: Jekiri 5 Asts: Maledon 7 PIR: Maledon 13	Boxscore	Pts: Larkin 19; Rebs: three players 5 Asts: Micić 8 PIR: Micić 25	Arena: Astroballe; Attendance: 5,506; Referees: Luigi Lamonica, Carlos Cortés, Clemens Fritz

19 November 2019	A|X Armani Exchange Milan (Italy)	92–88	(Israel) Maccabi Tel Aviv	Assago
20:45	Scoring by quarter: 21–21, 26–21, 24–22, 21–24
	Pts: Scola 20; Rebs: Brooks, Scola 7 Asts: Rodríguez 11; PIR: Rodríguez 26	Boxscore	Pts: Wilbekin 25; Rebs: Black 9 Asts: Wilbekin 5 PIR: Wilbekin 26	Arena: Mediolanum Forum; Attendance: 10,482 (tentative); Referees: Damir Javor, Carlos Peruga, Jakub Zamojski

19 November 2019	Real Madrid (Spain)	104–76	(Russia) Khimki	Madrid
21:00	Scoring by quarter: 31–25, 34–17, 27–14, 12–20
	Pts: Randolph 19; Rebs: Deck, Tavares 5 Asts: Llull 6 PIR: Randolph 23	Boxscore	Pts: Kramer 14; Rebs: Evans, Monia 5 Asts: Jović 3 PIR: Gill 16	Arena: WiZink Center; Attendance: 8,873; Referees: Saša Pukl, Miloš Koljenšić, Amit Balak

19 November 2019	Valencia Basket (Spain)	94–90	(Russia) Zenit Saint Petersburg	Valencia
21:00	Scoring by quarter: 15–16, 18–22, 24–25, 37–27
	Pts: Abalde 18; Rebs: Dubljević 11; Asts: Colom 7 PIR: Abalde 20	Boxscore	Pts: Renfroe, Thomas 17; Rebs: Iverson, Renfroe 5 Asts: Renfroe 6 PIR: Renfroe 27	Arena: La Fonteta; Attendance: 6,954 (tentative); Referees: Sreten Radović, Joseph Bissang, Igor Dragojević

20 November 2019	Barcelona (Spain)	89–63	(Turkey) Fenerbahçe Beko	Barcelona
21:00	Scoring by quarter: 25–15, 19–15, 23–10, 22–23
	Pts: Higgins 22; Rebs: Mirotić 10; Asts: Delaney 9 PIR: Higgins 22	Boxscore	Pts: Lauvergne 12; Rebs: Štimac 6 Asts: Sloukas 5 PIR: Lauvergne, Sloukas 11	Arena: Palau Blaugrana; Attendance: 6,287; Referees: Christos Christodoulou, Matej Boltauzer, Oļegs Latiševs

20 November 2019	Kirolbet Baskonia (Spain)	80–70	(Russia) CSKA Moscow	Vitoria-Gasteiz
21:00	Scoring by quarter: 24–19, 21–23, 17–17, 18–11
	Pts: Shengelia 22; Rebs: Stauskas 8 Asts: Stauskas 3 PIR: Shengelia 23	Boxscore	Pts: James, Strēlnieks 17; Rebs: Bolomboy 6 Asts: Strēlnieks 5 PIR: Strēlnieks 22	Arena: Buesa Arena; Attendance: 10,439; Referees: Ilija Belošević, Carmelo Paternicò, Piotr Pastusiak

=== Round 10 ===
21 November 2019	Žalgiris (Lithuania)	59–61	(Serbia) Crvena zvezda mts	Kaunas
19:00	Scoring by quarter: 21–16, 10–17, 15–14, 13–14
	Pts: Grigonis, Ulanovas 11; Rebs: Jankūnas 7 Asts: Walkup 4 PIR: Ulanovas 15	Boxscore	Pts: Baron 14; Rebs: Faye 7 Asts: L. Brown 3 PIR: L. Brown 19	Arena: Žalgirio Arena; Attendance: 14,033; Referees: Daniel Hierrezuelo, Anne Panther, Robert Vyklický

21 November 2019	ALBA Berlin (Germany)	80–99	(Greece) Olympiacos	Berlin
20:00	Scoring by quarter: 17–30, 21–25, 19–21, 23–23
	Pts: Eriksson 16; Rebs: Nnoko 5 Asts: Hermannsson 7 PIR: Mason 18	Boxscore	Pts: Rubit 16; Rebs: Rubit 8 Asts: Rochestie 6 PIR: Rubit 21	Arena: Mercedes-Benz Arena; Attendance: 8,833; Referees: Sreten Radović, Milija Vojinović, Michele Rossi

21 November 2019	A|X Armani Exchange Milan (Italy)	76–81	(Turkey) Anadolu Efes	Assago
20:45	Scoring by quarter: 17–16, 22–25, 21–21, 16–19
	Pts: Rodríguez 11; Rebs: Brooks 8 Asts: Rodríguez 9 PIR: Brooks 15	Boxscore	Pts: Larkin 17; Rebs: Pleiss 12; Asts: Micić 6 PIR: Pleiss 28	Arena: Mediolanum Forum; Attendance: 9,022; Referees: Miguel Ángel Pérez Pérez, Borys Ryzhyk, Milan Nedović

21 November 2019	Valencia Basket (Spain)	89–84	(Russia) Khimki	Valencia
21:00	Scoring by quarter: 26–33, 25–15, 21–22, 17–14
	Pts: Dubljević 18; Rebs: Tobey 10; Asts: Colom 11; PIR: Dubljević 29	Boxscore	Pts: Jović 19; Rebs: Booker 10; Asts: Jović 11; PIR: Jović 33	Arena: La Fonteta; Attendance: 7,023; Referees: Luigi Lamonica, Sašo Petek, Tomasz Trawicki

22 November 2019	Bayern Munich (Germany)	75–87	(Greece) Panathinaikos OPAP	Munich
20:30	Scoring by quarter: 24–16, 11–20, 18–29, 22–22
	Pts: Zipser 23; Rebs: Monroe 8 Asts: Nelson 4 PIR: Zipser 29	Boxscore	Pts: Thomas 14; Rebs: Calathes 7 Asts: Calathes, Rice 5 PIR: Rice 19	Arena: Audi Dome; Attendance: 5,563; Referees: Matej Boltauzer, Carlos Cortés, Josip Radojković

22 November 2019	LDLC ASVEL (France)	72–88	(Turkey) Fenerbahçe Beko	Villeurbanne
20:45	Scoring by quarter: 16–19, 20–29, 16–19, 20–21
	Pts: Lighty 18; Rebs: Kahudi, Lighty 4 Asts: Maledon 5 PIR: Jean-Charles 16	Boxscore	Pts: Štimac 21; Rebs: Štimac 8 Asts: Sloukas 8 PIR: Štimac 27	Arena: Astroballe; Attendance: 5,542; Referees: Damir Javor, Spiros Gkontas, Jordi Aliaga

22 November 2019	Barcelona (Spain)	96–73	(Israel) Maccabi Tel Aviv	Barcelona
21:00	Scoring by quarter: 21–18, 22–28, 31–20, 22–7
	Pts: Mirotić 25; Rebs: Mirotić 14; Asts: four players 3 PIR: Mirotić 35	Boxscore	Pts: Dorsey 15; Rebs: Avdija 7 Asts: Wilbekin 4 PIR: Wilbekin 15	Arena: Palau Blaugrana; Attendance: 6,734; Referees: Milivoje Jovčić, Carmelo Paternicò, Joseph Bissang

22 November 2019	Kirolbet Baskonia (Spain)	70–60	(Russia) Zenit Saint Petersburg	Vitoria-Gasteiz
21:00	Scoring by quarter: 15–18, 19–10, 18–16, 18–16
	Pts: Shengelia 20; Rebs: Diop, Shengelia 7 Asts: Vildoza 4 PIR: Shengelia 24	Boxscore	Pts: Ayón 18; Rebs: Abromaitis 6 Asts: Renfroe 5 PIR: Ayón 19	Arena: Buesa Arena; Attendance: 10,414; Referees: Saša Pukl, Mehdi Difallah, Saulius Racys

22 November 2019	Real Madrid (Spain)	97–81	(Russia) CSKA Moscow	Madrid
21:00	Scoring by quarter: 23–19, 29–29, 23–16, 22–17
	Pts: Campazzo 18; Rebs: Deck 11; Asts: Campazzo, Deck 6 PIR: Deck 33	Boxscore	Pts: Voigtmann 20; Rebs: Bolomboy 6 Asts: James 5 PIR: Voigtmann 19	Arena: WiZink Center; Attendance: 11,112; Referees: Robert Lottermoser, Oļegs Latiševs, Uroš Nikolić

=== Round 11 ===
28 November 2019	Fenerbahçe Beko (Turkey)	89–76	(Russia) Khimki	Istanbul
18:45	Scoring by quarter: 28–24, 16–25, 21–6, 24–21
	Pts: Datome 20; Rebs: Williams 8 Asts: Sloukas 9 PIR: Sloukas 23	Boxscore	Pts: Timma 26; Rebs: Gill 9 Asts: Jović 6 PIR: Gill 26	Arena: Ülker Sports and Event Hall; Attendance: 9,158; Referees: Ilija Belošević, Carmelo Paternicò, Carlos Cortés

28 November 2019	Crvena zvezda mts (Serbia)	76–73	(Spain) Valencia Basket	Belgrade
19:00	Scoring by quarter: 17–19, 20–22, 23–10, 16–22
	Pts: L. Brown 19; Rebs: Faye 8 Asts: L. Brown 6 PIR: L. Brown 21	Boxscore	Pts: Dubljević 22; Rebs: Dubljević 8 Asts: three players 3 PIR: Dubljević 29	Arena: Aleksandar Nikolić Hall; Attendance: 6,087; Referees: Spiros Gkontas, Petri Mäntylä, Jakub Zamojski

28 November 2019	ALBA Berlin (Germany)	69–62	(Lithuania) Žalgiris	Berlin
20:00	Scoring by quarter: 15–7, 17–19, 15–20, 22–16
	Pts: Giffey 13; Rebs: Giedraitis 8 Asts: Siva 6 PIR: Giffey 21	Boxscore	Pts: LeDay 15; Rebs: Landale 7 Asts: Walkup 5 PIR: Lekavičius 15	Arena: Mercedes-Benz Arena; Attendance: 10,121; Referees: Juan Carlos García González, Fernando Rocha, Josip Radojković

28 November 2019	Panathinaikos OPAP (Greece)	100–68	(Spain) Kirolbet Baskonia	Athens
20:00	Scoring by quarter: 20–17, 26–19, 26–15, 28–17
	Pts: Fredette 21; Rebs: Thomas 8 Asts: Calathes 9 PIR: Calathes 23	Boxscore	Pts: Fall, Stauskas 12; Rebs: Fall 7 Asts: Henry 9 PIR: Eric 14	Arena: O.A.K.A. Attendance: 11,945; Referees: Robert Lottermoser, Oļegs Latiševs, Gytis Vilius

28 November 2019	Maccabi Tel Aviv (Israel)	93–62	(France) LDLC ASVEL	Tel Aviv
20:05	Scoring by quarter: 20–17, 23–17, 24–13, 26–15
	Pts: Cohen, Wilbekin 16; Rebs: Hunter 7 Asts: Zoosman 5 PIR: Cohen 19	Boxscore	Pts: Lomažs, Maledon 10; Rebs: Bako 5 Asts: Taylor 3 PIR: Lomažs 10	Arena: Menora Mivtachim Arena; Attendance: 10,458; Referees: Sreten Radović, Daniel Hierrezuelo, Eduard Udyanskyy

29 November 2019	Zenit Saint Petersburg (Russia)	71–86	(Spain) Real Madrid	Saint Petersburg
18:00	Scoring by quarter: 19–22, 18–22, 19–22, 15–20
	Pts: Ayón 18; Rebs: Ayón 10; Asts: Albicy 5 PIR: Thomas 20	Boxscore	Pts: Campazzo 19; Rebs: Tavares 12; Asts: Campazzo 6 PIR: Deck 25	Arena: Sibur Arena; Attendance: 6,184; Referees: Christos Christodoulou, Sašo Petek, Anne Panther

29 November 2019	Anadolu Efes (Turkey)	104–75	(Germany) Bayern Munich	Istanbul
18:30	Scoring by quarter: 30–22, 27–18, 19–18, 28–17
	Pts: Larkin 49; Rebs: Anderson 9 Asts: three players 5 PIR: Larkin 53	Boxscore	Pts: Lučić 20; Rebs: Lučić 4 Asts: Monroe 5 PIR: Lučić 28	Arena: Sinan Erdem Dome; Attendance: 14,902; Referees: Damir Javor, Emilio Pérez Pizarro, Tomasz Trawicki

29 November 2019	Olympiacos (Greece)	91–70	(Italy) A|X Armani Exchange Milan	Piraeus
20:30	Scoring by quarter: 15–19, 25–18, 31–16, 20–17
	Pts: Papanikolaou 17; Rebs: Milutinov 11; Asts: Spanoulis 5 PIR: Milutinov 30	Boxscore	Pts: Rodríguez 14; Rebs: Biligha, Scola 4 Asts: Rodríguez, Roll 3 PIR: Rodríguez 11	Arena: Peace and Friendship Stadium; Attendance: 7,657; Referees: Matej Boltauzer, Mehdi Difallah, Jordi Aliaga

29 November 2019	Barcelona (Spain)	67–96	(Russia) CSKA Moscow	Barcelona
21:00	Scoring by quarter: 20–18, 18–33, 12–25, 17–20
	Pts: Davies, Mirotić 19; Rebs: Hanga 7 Asts: Delaney 6 PIR: Davies 24	Boxscore	Pts: James 14; Rebs: Hines 7 Asts: James 6 PIR: Kurbanov 19	Arena: Palau Blaugrana; Attendance: 7,002; Referees: Borys Ryzhyk, Saša Pukl, Tomislav Hordov

=== Round 12 ===
5 December 2019	CSKA Moscow (Russia)	85–82(OT)	(Lithuania) Žalgiris	Moscow
18:00	Scoring by quarter: 9–17, 23–14, 19–19, 18–19, Overtime: 16–13
	Pts: James 19; Rebs: Bolomboy 6 Asts: Hackett 6 PIR: James 18	Boxscore	Pts: Walkup 19; Rebs: Landale 11; Asts: Walkup 6 PIR: Walkup 22	Arena: Megasport Arena; Attendance: 6,114; Referees: Sreten Radović, Emilio Pérez Pizarro, Uroš Obrknežević

5 December 2019	Maccabi Tel Aviv (Israel)	77–55	(Germany) Bayern Munich	Tel Aviv
20:05	Scoring by quarter: 22–18, 19–8, 12–21, 24–8
	Pts: Wilbekin 16; Rebs: Zoosman 8 Asts: three players 2 PIR: Hunter 18	Boxscore	Pts: Koponen, Lučić 10; Rebs: Barthel, Monroe 6 Asts: Barthel 4 PIR: Lessort, Lučić 15	Arena: Menora Mivtachim Arena; Attendance: 10,389; Referees: Saša Pukl, Oļegs Latiševs, Jurgis Laurinavičius

5 December 2019	A|X Armani Exchange Milan (Italy)	67–77	(Serbia) Crvena zvezda mts	Assago
20:45	Scoring by quarter: 18–20, 22–19, 10–18, 17–20
	Pts: Rodríguez 14; Rebs: Brooks 7 Asts: Rodríguez, Scola 3 PIR: Rodríguez 16	Boxscore	Pts: L. Brown 21; Rebs: Faye, Gist 6 Asts: L. Brown 7 PIR: L. Brown 29	Arena: Mediolanum Forum; Attendance: 8,343; Referees: Robert Lottermoser, Sérgio Silva, Marcin Kowalski

5 December 2019	Real Madrid (Spain)	111–99	(Spain) Valencia Basket	Madrid
21:00	Scoring by quarter: 30–29, 23–20, 27–21, 31–29
	Pts: Randolph 18; Rebs: Thompkins 6 Asts: Campazzo 17; PIR: Randolph 28	Boxscore	Pts: Loyd 21; Rebs: Dubljević, Labeyrie 6 Asts: Loyd 5 PIR: Loyd 25	Arena: WiZink Center; Attendance: 8,956; Referees: Ilija Belošević, Carmelo Paternicò, Seffi Shemmesh

6 December 2019	Zenit Saint Petersburg (Russia)	75–70	(France) LDLC ASVEL	Saint Petersburg
18:00	Scoring by quarter: 17–15, 13–21, 23–13, 22–21
	Pts: Renfroe 16; Rebs: Ayón, Ponitka 5 Asts: Renfroe 8 PIR: Renfroe 22	Boxscore	Pts: Maledon 9 Rebs: Jean-Charles 9 Asts: Maledon 5 PIR: Jean-Charles 18	Arena: Yubileyny Sports Palace; Attendance: 3,242; Referees: Miguel Ángel Pérez Pérez, Robert Vyklický, Petros Papapetrou

6 December 2019	Khimki (Russia)	94–102	(Spain) Barcelona	Mytishchi
18:00	Scoring by quarter: 22–31, 26–30, 22–23, 24–18
	Pts: Shved 23; Rebs: Booker 5 Asts: Jerebko 6 PIR: Karasev 20	Boxscore	Pts: Mirotić 28; Rebs: Mirotić 9 Asts: Delaney 9 PIR: Mirotić 30	Arena: Mytishchi Arena; Attendance: 6,246; Referees: Fernando Rocha, Mehdi Difallah, Milan Nedović

6 December 2019	Fenerbahçe Beko (Turkey)	107–102(OT)	(Germany) ALBA Berlin	Istanbul
18:45	Scoring by quarter: 30–16, 11–24, 24–22, 23–26, Overtime: 19–14
	Pts: Sloukas 23; Rebs: Datome 7 Asts: Sloukas 10; PIR: Sloukas 39	Boxscore	Pts: Giedraitis 19; Rebs: Sikma 8 Asts: Siva 6 PIR: Sikma 26	Arena: Ülker Sports and Event Hall; Attendance: 8,282; Referees: Milivoje Jovčić, Sašo Petek, Amit Balak

6 December 2019	Panathinaikos OPAP (Greece)	99–93(OT)	(Greece) Olympiacos	Athens
20:30	Scoring by quarter: 18–17, 28–22, 17–22, 23–25, Overtime: 13–7
	Pts: Rice 41; Rebs: Calathes 10; Asts: Calathes 6 PIR: Rice 33	Boxscore	Pts: Spanoulis 18; Rebs: Milutinov 10; Asts: Spanoulis 5 PIR: Milutinov 27	Arena: O.A.K.A. Attendance: 17,396; Referees: Luigi Lamonica, Borys Ryzhyk, Carlos Peruga

6 December 2019	Kirolbet Baskonia (Spain)	77–102	(Turkey) Anadolu Efes	Vitoria-Gasteiz
21:00	Scoring by quarter: 16–26, 19–29, 18–21, 24–26
	Pts: Shengelia 20; Rebs: Shields 6 Asts: Stauskas 4 PIR: Shengelia 19	Boxscore	Pts: Larkin 24; Rebs: Pleiss 6 Asts: Micić 9 PIR: Larkin 37	Arena: Buesa Arena; Attendance: 11,153; Referees: Christos Christodoulou, Anne Panther, Michele Rossi

=== Round 13 ===
12 December 2019	Khimki (Russia)	104–87	(Germany) ALBA Berlin	Mytishchi
18:00	Scoring by quarter: 23–32, 31–19, 23–12, 27–24
	Pts: Booker 24; Rebs: Booker 10; Asts: Shved 8 PIR: Booker 36	Boxscore	Pts: Giedraitis 17; Rebs: Nnoko 11; Asts: Siva 9 PIR: Nnoko 24	Arena: Mytishchi Arena; Attendance: 4,341; Referees: Oļegs Latiševs, Joseph Bissang, Ioannis Foufis

12 December 2019	Fenerbahçe Beko (Turkey)	73–81	(Turkey) Anadolu Efes	Istanbul
18:45	Scoring by quarter: 22–20, 16–18, 11–21, 24–22
	Pts: Williams 16; Rebs: Datome 8 Asts: Sloukas 7 PIR: Datome, Sloukas 15	Boxscore	Pts: Simon 22; Rebs: Simon 9 Asts: Micić 5 PIR: Simon 31	Arena: Ülker Sports and Event Hall; Attendance: 12,278; Referees: Daniel Hierrezuelo, Saša Pukl, Mehdi Difallah

12 December 2019	Crvena zvezda mts (Serbia)	64–72	(Spain) Kirolbet Baskonia	Belgrade
19:00	Scoring by quarter: 14–20, 17–12, 12–24, 21–16
	Pts: L. Brown 20; Rebs: Kuzmić 8 Asts: L. Brown 5 PIR: L. Brown 22	Boxscore	Pts: Stauskas 22; Rebs: Shengelia 8 Asts: Vildoza 4 PIR: Stauskas 22	Arena: Štark Arena; Attendance: 10,367; Referees: Fernando Rocha, Jurgis Laurinavičius, Amit Balak

12 December 2019	Maccabi Tel Aviv (Israel)	90–80	(Russia) CSKA Moscow	Tel Aviv
20:05	Scoring by quarter: 20–29, 25–23, 21–12, 24–16
	Pts: Wilbekin 22; Rebs: Hunter 7 Asts: Wilbekin 9 PIR: Wilbekin 33	Boxscore	Pts: James 22; Rebs: Voigtmann 7 Asts: Kurbanov 5 PIR: James 18	Arena: Menora Mivtachim Arena; Attendance: 10,537; Referees: Christos Christodoulou, Juan Carlos García González, Milan Nedović

12 December 2019	Real Madrid (Spain)	93–77	(Greece) Olympiacos	Madrid
21:00	Scoring by quarter: 21–10, 20–20, 31–18, 21–29
	Pts: Causeur 18; Rebs: Tavares 10; Asts: Campazzo 6 PIR: Causeur 21	Boxscore	Pts: Cherry, Vezenkov 12; Rebs: Reed 6 Asts: Rochestie 9 PIR: Reed 16	Arena: WiZink Center; Attendance: 8,206; Referees: Damir Javor, Jakub Zamojski, Gytis Vilius

13 December 2019	Žalgiris (Lithuania)	82–86	(Spain) Valencia Basket	Kaunas
19:00	Scoring by quarter: 21–19, 27–28, 9–17, 25–22
	Pts: Ulanovas 16; Rebs: Landale 4 Asts: Walkup 7 PIR: Lekavičius, Walkup 15	Boxscore	Pts: Labeyrie 22; Rebs: Abalde, Labeyrie 5 Asts: Colom 9 PIR: Colom, Labeyrie 22	Arena: Žalgirio Arena; Attendance: 14,752; Referees: Robert Lottermoser, Matej Boltauzer, Aare Halliko

13 December 2019	Bayern Munich (Germany)	77–69	(Russia) Zenit Saint Petersburg	Munich
20:30	Scoring by quarter: 14–15, 23–20, 24–15, 16–19
	Pts: Lučić 17; Rebs: Barthel 8 Asts: Lô 7 PIR: Lučić 25	Boxscore	Pts: Renfroe 18; Rebs: Ayón 5 Asts: three players 2 PIR: Abromaitis 18	Arena: Audi Dome; Attendance: 4,043; Referees: Luigi Lamonica, Tomislav Hordov, Eduard Udyanskyy

13 December 2019	LDLC ASVEL (France)	89–82	(Italy) A|X Armani Exchange Milan	Villeurbanne
20:45	Scoring by quarter: 20–24, 18–21, 32–16, 19–21
	Pts: Lighty 19; Rebs: Jekiri 12; Asts: Jackson, Taylor 4 PIR: Taylor 22	Boxscore	Pts: Scola 14; Rebs: Micov 5 Asts: Rodríguez 10; PIR: Rodríguez 17	Arena: Astroballe; Attendance: 5,358; Referees: Emilio Pérez Pizarro, Tomasz Trawicki, Uroš Nikolić

13 December 2019	Barcelona (Spain)	98–86	(Greece) Panathinaikos OPAP	Barcelona
21:00	Scoring by quarter: 28–23, 27–24, 16–18, 27–21
	Pts: Mirotić 23; Rebs: Mirotić 7 Asts: Hanga 6 PIR: Mirotić 30	Boxscore	Pts: Fredette 19; Rebs: Calathes, Papapetrou 5 Asts: Calathes 13; PIR: Calathes 26	Arena: Palau Blaugrana; Attendance: 5,006; Referees: Ilija Belošević, Emin Moğulkoç, Sašo Petek

=== Round 14 ===
17 December 2019	Zenit Saint Petersburg (Russia)	71–82	(Israel) Maccabi Tel Aviv	Saint Petersburg
18:00	Scoring by quarter: 21–21, 9–10, 12–28, 29–23
	Pts: Thomas 15; Rebs: Iverson 10; Asts: Renfroe 6 PIR: Thomas 16	Boxscore	Pts: Dorsey 17; Rebs: Avdija 7 Asts: Wilbekin, Zoosman 5 PIR: Hunter 19	Arena: Sibur Arena; Attendance: 3,810; Referees: Borys Ryzhyk, Matej Boltauzer, Moritz Reiter

17 December 2019	Žalgiris (Lithuania)	68–74	(Turkey) Anadolu Efes	Kaunas
19:00	Scoring by quarter: 17–26, 26–16, 10–13, 15–19
	Pts: Landale 16; Rebs: Ulanovas 7 Asts: Lekavičius, Walkup 5 PIR: Ulanovas 21	Boxscore	Pts: Micić, Pleiss 18; Rebs: Singleton 10; Asts: three players 3 PIR: Pleiss 21	Arena: Žalgirio Arena; Attendance: 14,110; Referees: Ilija Belošević, Carmelo Paternicò, Jordi Aliaga

17 December 2019	Panathinaikos OPAP (Greece)	81–78	(Turkey) Fenerbahçe Beko	Athens
20:00	Scoring by quarter: 22–21, 20–25, 23–11, 16–21
	Pts: Fredette 22; Rebs: Mitoglou 7 Asts: Calathes 8 PIR: Fredette 26	Boxscore	Pts: Sloukas 15; Rebs: Datome 6 Asts: Sloukas 8 PIR: Sloukas 24	Arena: O.A.K.A. Attendance: 0 Referees: Juan Carlos García González, Fernando Rocha, Tomislav Hordov

17 December 2019	Real Madrid (Spain)	76–67	(Italy) A|X Armani Exchange Milan	Madrid
20:00	Scoring by quarter: 18–21, 12–18, 24–13, 22–15
	Pts: Randolph 16; Rebs: Randolph, Tavares 7 Asts: Campazzo 12; PIR: Campazzo 25	Boxscore	Pts: Micov 22; Rebs: Brooks 9 Asts: Brooks, Rodríguez 2 PIR: Micov 18	Arena: WiZink Center; Attendance: 8,933; Referees: Sreten Radović, Saša Pukl, Joseph Bissang

17 December 2019	Barcelona (Spain)	80–67	(France) LDLC ASVEL	Barcelona
21:00	Scoring by quarter: 22–19, 26–19, 15–18, 17–11
	Pts: Abrines 16; Rebs: Tomić 8 Asts: Delaney 5 PIR: Mirotić 17	Boxscore	Pts: Lighty 16; Rebs: Lighty 6 Asts: Lomažs, Taylor 4 PIR: Lighty 20	Arena: Palau Blaugrana; Attendance: 5,028; Referees: Oļegs Latiševs, Piotr Pastusiak, Mario Majkić

17 December 2019	Valencia Basket (Spain)	105–77	(Spain) Kirolbet Baskonia	Valencia
21:00	Scoring by quarter: 19–19, 27–17, 23–22, 36–19
	Pts: Dubljević 25; Rebs: Dubljević 5 Asts: Colom 6 PIR: Dubljević 25	Boxscore	Pts: Shields 22; Rebs: Shengelia 8 Asts: Henry 5 PIR: Shields 25	Arena: La Fonteta; Attendance: 7,697; Referees: Milivoje Jovčić, Damir Javor, Ingus Baumanis

18 December 2019	CSKA Moscow (Russia)	100–74	(Serbia) Crvena zvezda mts	Moscow
18:00	Scoring by quarter: 26–21, 26–23, 24–18, 24–12
	Pts: James 29; Rebs: Vorontsevich 6 Asts: Baker 5 PIR: James 32	Boxscore	Pts: Davidovac 17; Rebs: Kuzmić 6 Asts: Čović 9 PIR: Davidovac 14	Arena: Megasport Arena; Attendance: 6,011; Referees: Miguel Ángel Pérez Pérez, Seffi Shemmesh, Sebastien Clivaz

18 December 2019	ALBA Berlin (Germany)	76–77(OT)	(Germany) Bayern Munich	Berlin
20:00	Scoring by quarter: 10–19, 18–11, 20–20, 24–22, Overtime: 4–5
	Pts: Mason 17; Rebs: Nnoko, Sikma 11; Asts: Hermannsson 6 PIR: Sikma 20	Boxscore	Pts: Lučić 19; Rebs: Monroe 10; Asts: Lô, Nelson 4 PIR: Monroe 25	Arena: Mercedes-Benz Arena; Attendance: 11,229; Referees: Christos Christodoulou, Carlos Peruga, Nick Van Den Broeck

18 December 2019	Olympiacos (Greece)	109–98(OT)	(Russia) Khimki	Piraeus
20:00	Scoring by quarter: 25–20, 24–22, 21–25, 26–29, Overtime: 13–2
	Pts: Printezis 26; Rebs: Milutinov, Printezis 7 Asts: Spanoulis 10; PIR: Printezis 29	Boxscore	Pts: Shved 36; Rebs: Booker 8 Asts: Shved 9 PIR: Shved 30	Arena: Peace and Friendship Stadium; Attendance: 6,757; Referees: Robert Lottermoser, Emin Moğulkoç, Amit Balak

=== Round 15 ===
19 December 2019	Fenerbahçe Beko (Turkey)	81–84	(Russia) Zenit Saint Petersburg	Istanbul
18:45	Scoring by quarter: 22–18, 21–20, 16–22, 22–24
	Pts: Lauvergne 18; Rebs: Düverioğlu 7 Asts: de Colo, Sloukas 6 PIR: Kalinić 21	Boxscore	Pts: Ponitka 16; Rebs: Abromaitis 7 Asts: Ponitka 8 PIR: Ponitka 29	Arena: Ülker Sports and Event Hall; Attendance: 8,153; Referees: Sreten Radović, Jakub Zamojski, Mario Majkić

19 December 2019	Maccabi Tel Aviv (Israel)	88–79	(Greece) Panathinaikos OPAP	Tel Aviv
20:05	Scoring by quarter: 13–29, 30–17, 22–23, 23–10
	Pts: Wilbekin 23; Rebs: Caloiaro, Hunter 7 Asts: Dorsey 7 PIR: Hunter 23	Boxscore	Pts: Thomas 24; Rebs: Papagiannis 9 Asts: Calathes 4 PIR: Thomas 22	Arena: Menora Mivtachim Arena; Attendance: 10,592; Referees: Miguel Ángel Pérez Pérez, Damir Javor, Carmelo Paternicò

19 December 2019	A|X Armani Exchange Milan (Italy)	78–71	(Spain) Valencia Basket	Assago
20:45	Scoring by quarter: 26–24, 17–19, 19–10, 16–18
	Pts: Della Valle 15; Rebs: Tarczewski 10; Asts: Rodríguez 8 PIR: Tarczewski 22	Boxscore	Pts: Dubljević 20; Rebs: Dubljević, Tobey 6 Asts: Colom 6 PIR: Dubljević 21	Arena: Mediolanum Forum; Attendance: 7,531; Referees: Borys Ryzhyk, Oļegs Latiševs, Miloš Koljenšić

19 December 2019	Kirolbet Baskonia (Spain)	55–77	(Spain) Real Madrid	Vitoria-Gasteiz
21:00	Scoring by quarter: 13–15, 16–30, 15–12, 11–20
	Pts: Shields 14; Rebs: Fall 9 Asts: Henry, Shengelia 2 PIR: Shields 12	Boxscore	Pts: Mickey 15; Rebs: Mickey 8 Asts: Laprovíttola 6 PIR: Mickey 21	Arena: Buesa Arena; Attendance: 11,648; Referees: Luigi Lamonica, Spiros Gkontas, Milan Nedović

20 December 2019	Khimki (Russia)	83–74	(Lithuania) Žalgiris	Mytishchi
18:00	Scoring by quarter: 21–16, 17–17, 19–16, 26–25
	Pts: Jović, Shved 25; Rebs: Gill 7 Asts: Kramer, Shved 5 PIR: Jović 29	Boxscore	Pts: Landale 24; Rebs: Jankūnas, Landale 5 Asts: Walkup 6 PIR: Landale 30	Arena: Mytishchi Arena; Attendance: 4,872; Referees: Christos Christodoulou, Carlos Peruga, Seffi Shemmesh

20 December 2019	Anadolu Efes (Turkey)	80–81	(Russia) CSKA Moscow	Istanbul
18:30	Scoring by quarter: 22–23, 25–20, 19–16, 14–22
	Pts: Simon 21; Rebs: Singleton 6 Asts: Larkin 4 PIR: Simon 22	Boxscore	Pts: James 28; Rebs: Hines, James 6 Asts: Hackett 6 PIR: James 36	Arena: Sinan Erdem Dome; Attendance: 15,173; Referees: Robert Lottermoser, Damir Javor, Gytis Vilius

20 December 2019	Crvena zvezda mts (Serbia)	88–81	(Greece) Olympiacos	Belgrade
19:00	Scoring by quarter: 16–21, 24–29, 21–11, 27–20
	Pts: L. Brown 34; Rebs: Gist 7 Asts: L. Brown, Jenkins 4 PIR: L. Brown 32	Boxscore	Pts: Paul 21; Rebs: Milutinov 11; Asts: Rochestie 5 PIR: Milutinov 34	Arena: Štark Arena; Attendance: 8,076; Referees: Daniel Hierrezuelo, Joseph Bissang, Rain Peerandi

20 December 2019	Bayern Munich (Germany)	67–77	(Spain) Barcelona	Munich
20:30	Scoring by quarter: 16–20, 9–19, 20–17, 22–21
	Pts: Zipser 19; Rebs: Lučić 4 Asts: Flaccadori 5 PIR: Zipser 17	Boxscore	Pts: Higgins 16; Rebs: Mirotić 9 Asts: Hanga 10; PIR: Hanga 23	Arena: Audi Dome; Attendance: 5,610; Referees: Matej Boltauzer, Ioannis Foufis, Hugues Thépénier

20 December 2019	LDLC ASVEL (France)	93–81	(Germany) ALBA Berlin	Villeurbanne
20:45	Scoring by quarter: 18–18, 18–20, 31–14, 26–29
	Pts: Lighty 14; Rebs: Jean-Charles 6 Asts: Taylor 9 PIR: Kahudi 17	Boxscore	Pts: Hermannsson 17; Rebs: Nnoko 6 Asts: Giedraitis, Hermannsson 5 PIR: Sikma 24	Arena: Astroballe; Attendance: 5,231; Referees: Ilija Belošević, Saša Pukl, Mykola Ambrosov

=== Round 16 ===
26 December 2019	CSKA Moscow (Russia)	78–75	(Italy) A|X Armani Exchange Milan	Kaliningrad
18:00	Scoring by quarter: 19–13, 13–26, 27–22, 19–14
	Pts: Hackett 28; Rebs: Voigtmann 8 Asts: James 11; PIR: James 28	Boxscore	Pts: Gudaitis, Rodríguez 13; Rebs: Tarczewski 10; Asts: Micov, Tarczewski 3 PIR: Tarczewski 23	Arena: Yantarny Sports Palace; Attendance: 6,522; Referees: Daniel Hierrezuelo, Ilija Belošević, Sašo Petek

26 December 2019	Anadolu Efes (Turkey)	99–79	(Israel) Maccabi Tel Aviv	Istanbul
18:30	Scoring by quarter: 23–19, 25–22, 32–17, 19–21
	Pts: Micić 23; Rebs: Singleton 6 Asts: Micić 5 PIR: Beaubois 23	Boxscore	Pts: Cohen 15; Rebs: four players 6 Asts: Avdija 6 PIR: Caloiaro, Cohen 14	Arena: Sinan Erdem Dome; Attendance: 15,003; Referees: Luigi Lamonica, Carlos Peruga, Petri Mäntylä

26 December 2019	ALBA Berlin (Germany)	81–57	(Spain) Kirolbet Baskonia	Berlin
20:00	Scoring by quarter: 23–15, 18–11, 16–11, 24–20
	Pts: Hermannsson 18; Rebs: Nnoko 11; Asts: Sikma 5 PIR: Giedraitis, Nnoko 23	Boxscore	Pts: Shields 11; Rebs: Fall, Stauskas 6 Asts: Stauskas 4 PIR: Eric 11	Arena: Mercedes-Benz Arena; Attendance: 8,818; Referees: Emin Moğulkoç, Jakub Zamojski, Rain Peerandi

26 December 2019	Panathinaikos OPAP (Greece)	75–87	(Spain) Real Madrid	Athens
20:00	Scoring by quarter: 18–22, 16–22, 24–22, 17–21
	Pts: Calathes 19; Rebs: Fredette 9 Asts: Calathes 7 PIR: Fredette 22	Boxscore	Pts: Randolph 22; Rebs: Tavares 14; Asts: Campazzo 8 PIR: Tavares 32	Arena: O.A.K.A. Attendance: 12,513; Referees: Matej Boltauzer, Oļegs Latiševs, Mehdi Difallah

26 December 2019	LDLC ASVEL (France)	92–88	(Russia) Khimki	Villeurbanne
20:45	Scoring by quarter: 24–24, 26–21, 24–12, 18–31
	Pts: Lighty 20; Rebs: Jekiri 7 Asts: Taylor 8 PIR: Lighty 27	Boxscore	Pts: Timma 20; Rebs: Gill 5 Asts: Jović 7 PIR: Evans 15	Arena: Astroballe; Attendance: 5,313; Referees: Borys Ryzhyk, Spiros Gkontas, Carlos Cortés

27 December 2019	Zenit Saint Petersburg (Russia)	58–65	(Serbia) Crvena zvezda mts	Kazan
18:00	Scoring by quarter: 16–20, 24–17, 7–14, 11–14
	Pts: Hollins 14; Rebs: Ayón, Iverson 6 Asts: Renfroe 4 PIR: Iverson 14	Boxscore	Pts: Baron 26; Rebs: L. Brown 9 Asts: L. Brown 6 PIR: Baron 34	Arena: Basket-Hall Kazan; Attendance: 3,020; Referees: Christos Christodoulou, Piotr Pastusiak, Aare Halliko

27 December 2019	Fenerbahçe Beko (Turkey)	98–100(OT)	(Spain) Valencia Basket	Istanbul
18:45	Scoring by quarter: 24–22, 24–18, 22–19, 14–25, Overtime: 14–16
	Pts: de Colo 31; Rebs: de Colo 7 Asts: Sloukas 9 PIR: de Colo 37	Boxscore	Pts: Dubljević 30; Rebs: Dubljević 12; Asts: Abalde, Van Rossom 5 PIR: Dubljević 42	Arena: Ülker Sports and Event Hall; Attendance: 8,211; Referees: Luigi Lamonica, Elias Koromilas, Saulius Racys

27 December 2019	Bayern Munich (Germany)	73–98	(Lithuania) Žalgiris	Munich
20:30	Scoring by quarter: 13–21, 22–22, 15–25, 23–30
	Pts: Barthel 20; Rebs: Monroe 7 Asts: Lô 7 PIR: Barthel 23	Boxscore	Pts: LeDay, Milaknis 19; Rebs: Jankūnas, LeDay 5 Asts: Walkup 11; PIR: Walkup 26	Arena: Audi Dome; Attendance: 5,989; Referees: Miguel Ángel Pérez Pérez, Milivoje Jovčić, Ersan Kartal

27 December 2019	Barcelona (Spain)	90–80	(Greece) Olympiacos	Barcelona
21:00	Scoring by quarter: 20–12, 20–27, 29–19, 21–22
	Pts: Mirotić 21; Rebs: Mirotić 15; Asts: Delaney, Higgins 4 PIR: Mirotić 33	Boxscore	Pts: Reed 15; Rebs: Papanikolaou, Rubit 5 Asts: Rochestie 7 PIR: Rubit 17	Arena: Palau Blaugrana; Attendance: 7,173; Referees: Saša Pukl, Carmelo Paternicò, Tomasz Trawicki

=== Round 17 ===
2 January 2020	Crvena zvezda mts (Serbia)	93–63	(Germany) Bayern Munich	Belgrade
19:00	Scoring by quarter: 25–13, 28–18, 18–15, 22–17
	Pts: L. Brown, Punter 15; Rebs: Kuzmić 7 Asts: L. Brown 7 PIR: L. Brown 26	Boxscore	Pts: Monroe 20; Rebs: Radošević, Zipser 6 Asts: Lô, Monroe 3 PIR: Monroe 28	Arena: Štark Arena; Attendance: 16,824; Referees: Carmelo Paternicò, Emilio Pérez Pizarro, Ingus Baumanis

2 January 2020	Žalgiris (Lithuania)	73–68	(Israel) Maccabi Tel Aviv	Kaunas
19:00	Scoring by quarter: 17–21, 12–13, 24–19, 20–15
	Pts: Lekavičius 23; Rebs: Walkup 7 Asts: Walkup 3 PIR: Lekavičius 20	Boxscore	Pts: Cohen 20; Rebs: Cohen, Reynolds 7 Asts: Caloiaro 5 PIR: Cohen 23	Arena: Žalgirio Arena; Attendance: 14,973; Referees: Saša Pukl, Joseph Bissang, Uroš Nikolić

2 January 2020	Olympiacos (Greece)	87–96	(Turkey) Fenerbahçe Beko	Piraeus
20:00	Scoring by quarter: 20–22, 20–30, 21–22, 26–22
	Pts: Printezis, Spanoulis 14; Rebs: Milutinov 7 Asts: Spanoulis 8 PIR: Milutinov, Printezis 19	Boxscore	Pts: de Colo 32; Rebs: Williams 5 Asts: Sloukas 9 PIR: de Colo 31	Arena: Peace and Friendship Stadium; Attendance: 10,234; Referees: Miguel Ángel Pérez Pérez, Oļegs Latiševs, Robert Vyklický

2 January 2020	Kirolbet Baskonia (Spain)	76–74	(Spain) Barcelona	Vitoria-Gasteiz
21:00	Scoring by quarter: 21–15, 26–16, 18–23, 11–20
	Pts: Henry 20; Rebs: Shengelia 5 Asts: Henry, Shengelia 3 PIR: Henry 22	Boxscore	Pts: Mirotić 17; Rebs: Davies 6 Asts: Delaney 6 PIR: Mirotić 19	Arena: Buesa Arena; Attendance: 13,628; Referees: Christos Christodoulou, Mehdi Difallah, Sérgio Silva

3 January 2020	CSKA Moscow (Russia)	102–106(OT)	(Greece) Panathinaikos OPAP	Kaliningrad
18:00	Scoring by quarter: 22–17, 23–32, 24–20, 20–20, Overtime: 13–17
	Pts: James 30; Rebs: Kurbanov 8 Asts: James 5 PIR: Hackett 22	Boxscore	Pts: Mitoglou 25; Rebs: Mitoglou 16; Asts: Calathes 18; PIR: Calathes 40	Arena: Yantarny Sports Palace; Attendance: 6,528; Referees: Borys Ryzhyk, Carlos Peruga, Milivoje Jovčić

3 January 2020	Anadolu Efes (Turkey)	101–82	(Russia) Khimki	Istanbul
18:30	Scoring by quarter: 21–19, 26–24, 30–18, 24–21
	Pts: Larkin, Pleiss 20; Rebs: Pleiss 10; Asts: Larkin 4 PIR: Larkin 29	Boxscore	Pts: Evans 15; Rebs: Evans 9 Asts: Jović, Kramer 6 PIR: Evans 23	Arena: Sinan Erdem Dome; Attendance: 12,844; Referees: Matej Boltauzer, Miloš Koljenšić, Michele Rossi

3 January 2020	LDLC ASVEL (France)	77–87	(Spain) Real Madrid	Villeurbanne
20:45	Scoring by quarter: 21–23, 16–29, 22–20, 18–15
	Pts: Kahudi 18; Rebs: Jekiri 11; Asts: Taylor 5 PIR: Kahudi 22	Boxscore	Pts: Thompkins 20; Rebs: Mickey, Thompkins 7 Asts: Campazzo 9 PIR: Mickey 24	Arena: Astroballe; Attendance: 5,548; Referees: Fernando Rocha, Emin Moğulkoç, Nick Van Den Broeck

3 January 2020	A|X Armani Exchange Milan (Italy)	73–72	(Russia) Zenit Saint Petersburg	Assago
20:45	Scoring by quarter: 19–17, 22–24, 14–15, 18–16
	Pts: Micov 13; Rebs: Scola 10; Asts: Rodríguez 3 PIR: Tarczewski 24	Boxscore	Pts: Ayón 15; Rebs: Ayón 7 Asts: Albicy 5 PIR: Ayón 19	Arena: Mediolanum Forum; Attendance: 8,809; Referees: Damir Javor, Ioannis Foufis, Amit Balak

3 January 2020	Valencia Basket (Spain)	91–77	(Germany) ALBA Berlin	Valencia
21:00	Scoring by quarter: 18–27, 19–15, 25–15, 29–20
	Pts: Loyd 19; Rebs: Dubljević 10; Asts: Van Rossom 11; PIR: Abalde 22	Boxscore	Pts: Eriksson 14; Rebs: Nnoko 8 Asts: Sikma 6 PIR: Nnoko 16	Arena: La Fonteta; Attendance: 7,809; Referees: Sreten Radović, Sašo Petek, Eduard Udyanskyy

=== Round 18 ===
9 January 2020	ALBA Berlin (Germany)	89–95	(Israel) Maccabi Tel Aviv	Berlin
20:00	Scoring by quarter: 28–31, 17–19, 19–22, 25–23
	Pts: Hermannsson 16; Rebs: Sikma 12; Asts: Siva 6 PIR: Sikma 27	Boxscore	Pts: Bryant 19; Rebs: Bryant 8 Asts: Wilbekin 5 PIR: Bryant 29	Arena: Mercedes-Benz Arena; Attendance: 8,616; Referees: Oļegs Latiševs, Mehdi Difallah, Jordi Aliaga

9 January 2020	A|X Armani Exchange Milan (Italy)	96–87	(Greece) Panathinaikos OPAP	Assago
20:45	Scoring by quarter: 19–18, 25–16, 29–23, 23–30
	Pts: Rodríguez 22; Rebs: Brooks 7 Asts: three players 3 PIR: Moraschini 18	Boxscore	Pts: Fredette 28; Rebs: Papapetrou 9 Asts: Calathes 11; PIR: Fredette 24	Arena: Mediolanum Forum; Attendance: 8,654; Referees: Robert Lottermoser, Emilio Pérez Pizarro, Uroš Nikolić

9 January 2020	Kirolbet Baskonia (Spain)	65–79	(Turkey) Fenerbahçe Beko	Vitoria-Gasteiz
21:00	Scoring by quarter: 11–20, 17–22, 17–20, 20–17
	Pts: Shengelia 21; Rebs: Shengelia 7 Asts: Henry 5 PIR: Shengelia 37	Boxscore	Pts: Westermann 21; Rebs: Thomas 8 Asts: Williams 5 PIR: Williams 24	Arena: Buesa Arena; Attendance: 10,613; Referees: Matej Boltauzer, Carmelo Paternicò, Petri Mäntylä

9 January 2020	Real Madrid (Spain)	88–82	(Lithuania) Žalgiris	Madrid
21:00	Scoring by quarter: 20–18, 27–23, 21–18, 20–23
	Pts: Thompkins 20; Rebs: Thompkins 5 Asts: Campazzo 8 PIR: Thompkins 21	Boxscore	Pts: Lekavičius 21; Rebs: three players 4 Asts: Walkup 6 PIR: Lekavičius 20	Arena: WiZink Center; Attendance: 9,096; Referees: Damir Javor, Michele Rossi, Aare Halliko

10 January 2020	Khimki (Russia)	81–83	(Russia) Zenit Saint Petersburg	Mytishchi
18:00	Scoring by quarter: 15–16, 22–20, 11–25, 33–22
	Pts: Shved 30; Rebs: Jerebko 6 Asts: Shved 6 PIR: Shved 31	Boxscore	Pts: Thomas 20; Rebs: Ponitka, Thomas 8 Asts: Khvostov 7 PIR: Thomas 30	Arena: Mytishchi Arena; Attendance: 4,349; Referees: Saša Pukl, Milivoje Jovčić, Rain Peerandi

10 January 2020	Bayern Munich (Germany)	77–84	(Russia) CSKA Moscow	Munich
20:30	Scoring by quarter: 10–18, 15–23, 27–18, 25–25
	Pts: Monroe 20; Rebs: Monroe 10; Asts: Đedović 8 PIR: Huestis, Monroe 19	Boxscore	Pts: James 27; Rebs: Hines 8 Asts: James 7 PIR: James 32	Arena: Audi Dome; Attendance: 5,251; Referees: Oļegs Latiševs, Carlos Cortés, Marcin Kowalski

10 January 2020	LDLC ASVEL (France)	80–83	(Serbia) Crvena zvezda mts	Villeurbanne
20:45	Scoring by quarter: 30–13, 19–17, 16–34, 15–19
	Pts: Payne 17; Rebs: Payne 8 Asts: Strazel 4 PIR: Payne 26	Boxscore	Pts: Štimac 21; Rebs: Gist 6 Asts: L. Brown 7 PIR: Štimac 23	Arena: Astroballe; Attendance: 5,518; Referees: Carlos Peruga, Sérgio Silva, Gytis Vilius

10 January 2020	Barcelona (Spain)	82–86	(Turkey) Anadolu Efes	Barcelona
21:00	Scoring by quarter: 19–24, 23–21, 16–21, 24–20
	Pts: Davies 20; Rebs: Mirotić 8 Asts: Claver, Ribas 5 PIR: Delaney 17	Boxscore	Pts: Larkin 26; Rebs: Simon, Singleton 8 Asts: Larkin 5 PIR: Larkin 35	Arena: Palau Blaugrana; Attendance: 7,031; Referees: Borys Ryzhyk, Fernando Rocha, Sašo Petek

10 January 2020	Valencia Basket (Spain)	91–93	(Greece) Olympiacos	Valencia
21:00	Scoring by quarter: 16–16, 20–23, 27–31, 28–23
	Pts: San Emeterio 23; Rebs: Dubljević 9 Asts: three players 2 PIR: Marinković 26	Boxscore	Pts: Printezis 18; Rebs: Printezis, Vezenkov 7 Asts: Spanoulis 8 PIR: Printezis 26	Arena: La Fonteta; Attendance: 7,142; Referees: Ilija Belošević, Seffi Shemmesh, Hugues Thépénier

=== Round 19 ===
14 January 2020	CSKA Moscow (Russia)	60–55	(Spain) Real Madrid	Moscow
18:00	Scoring by quarter: 14–21, 12–12, 17–10, 17–12
	Pts: James 19; Rebs: Kurbanov 10; Asts: six players 1 PIR: Hines, Kurbanov 13	Boxscore	Pts: Thompkins 14; Rebs: Tavares 9 Asts: Campazzo 5 PIR: Campazzo 18	Arena: Megasport Arena; Attendance: 8,517; Referees: Christos Christodoulou, Carmelo Paternicò, Joseph Bissang

14 January 2020	Khimki (Russia)	75–84	(Spain) Valencia Basket	Mytishchi
18:00	Scoring by quarter: 23–29, 24–15, 15–19, 13–21
	Pts: Shved 18; Rebs: Shved 5 Asts: Jović, Shved 5 PIR: Gill 17	Boxscore	Pts: San Emeterio 18; Rebs: Abalde 11; Asts: Van Rossom 7 PIR: San Emeterio 25	Arena: Mytishchi Arena; Attendance: 2,917; Referees: Damir Javor, Tomasz Trawicki, Josip Radojković

14 January 2020	Anadolu Efes (Turkey)	88–68	(Italy) A|X Armani Exchange Milan	Istanbul
18:30	Scoring by quarter: 16–15, 26–18, 23–16, 23–19
	Pts: Larkin 23; Rebs: three players 6 Asts: Simon 5 PIR: Larkin 30	Boxscore	Pts: Gudaitis 11; Rebs: Gudaitis 7 Asts: Nedović 5 PIR: Gudaitis 19	Arena: Sinan Erdem Dome; Attendance: 13,708; Referees: Miguel Ángel Pérez Pérez, Saša Pukl, Mehdi Difallah

14 January 2020	Fenerbahçe Beko (Turkey)	86–64	(France) LDLC ASVEL	Istanbul
18:45	Scoring by quarter: 23–15, 26–13, 13–15, 24–21
	Pts: de Colo, Williams 16; Rebs: Datome, Sloukas 6 Asts: Sloukas 10; PIR: Sloukas 24	Boxscore	Pts: Noua 12; Rebs: Noua 6 Asts: Maledon 4 PIR: Jean-Charles, Noua 12	Arena: Ülker Sports and Event Hall; Attendance: 7,808; Referees: Robert Lottermoser, Piotr Pastusiak, Michele Rossi

14 January 2020	Olympiacos (Greece)	86–93	(Germany) ALBA Berlin	Piraeus
20:00	Scoring by quarter: 22–19, 20–31, 29–18, 15–25
	Pts: Milutinov, Printezis 15; Rebs: Printezis 9 Asts: Spanoulis 9 PIR: Printezis 28	Boxscore	Pts: Eriksson 22; Rebs: Giedraitis 5 Asts: Hermannsson 6 PIR: Eriksson 22	Arena: Peace and Friendship Stadium; Attendance: 7,233; Referees: Juan Carlos García González, Milivoje Jovčić, Sérgio Silva

14 January 2020	Maccabi Tel Aviv (Israel)	92–85	(Spain) Barcelona	Tel Aviv
20:05	Scoring by quarter: 20–27, 28–14, 17–16, 27–28
	Pts: Dorsey 19; Rebs: Hunter 7 Asts: three players 3 PIR: Dorsey 18	Boxscore	Pts: Mirotić 22; Rebs: Mirotić 10; Asts: Delaney, Hanga 6 PIR: Mirotić 30	Arena: Menora Mivtachim Arena; Attendance: 10,722; Referees: Ilija Belošević, Emin Moğulkoç, Tomislav Hordov

15 January 2020	Zenit Saint Petersburg (Russia)	72–66	(Spain) Kirolbet Baskonia	Saint Petersburg
18:00	Scoring by quarter: 23–16, 16–15, 14–18, 19–17
	Pts: Thomas 19; Rebs: Iverson 8 Asts: Renfroe 10; PIR: Thomas 27	Boxscore	Pts: Stauskas 15; Rebs: Eric, Shengelia 6 Asts: Shengelia 6 PIR: Shengelia 24	Arena: Sibur Arena; Attendance: 3,439; Referees: Oļegs Latiševs, Anne Panther, Gytis Vilius

15 January 2020	Crvena zvezda mts (Serbia)	70–76	(Lithuania) Žalgiris	Belgrade
19:00	Scoring by quarter: 20–22, 18–16, 15–19, 17–19
	Pts: L. Brown 14; Rebs: Kuzmić 8 Asts: L. Brown 6 PIR: Kuzmić 20	Boxscore	Pts: Lekavičius 17; Rebs: Landale 9 Asts: Landale 4 PIR: Lekavičius 22	Arena: Štark Arena; Attendance: 15,874; Referees: Borys Ryzhyk, Fernando Rocha, Spiros Gkontas

15 January 2020	Panathinaikos OPAP (Greece)	98–83	(Germany) Bayern Munich	Athens
20:00	Scoring by quarter: 28–18, 25–35, 23–22, 22–8
	Pts: Thomas 18; Rebs: Papapetrou, Thomas 9 Asts: Calathes 12; PIR: Thomas 28	Boxscore	Pts: Monroe 17; Rebs: Monroe 9 Asts: Bray 5 PIR: Monroe 26	Arena: O.A.K.A. Attendance: 8,013; Referees: Daniel Hierrezuelo, Petri Mäntylä, Sinan İşgüder

=== Round 20 ===
16 January 2020	Khimki (Russia)	102–94	(Spain) Real Madrid	Mytishchi
18:00	Scoring by quarter: 25–21, 30–23, 25–25, 22–25
	Pts: Shved 21; Rebs: Shved, Timma 5 Asts: Shved 13; PIR: Shved 31	Boxscore	Pts: Mickey 20; Rebs: Mickey 5 Asts: Laprovíttola 6 PIR: Mickey 29	Arena: Mytishchi Arena; Attendance: 4,711; Referees: Robert Lottermoser, Tomislav Hordov, Sašo Petek

16 January 2020	Fenerbahçe Beko (Turkey)	74–80	(Spain) Barcelona	Istanbul
18:45	Scoring by quarter: 12–24, 27–18, 17–19, 18–19
	Pts: Sloukas 14; Rebs: Sloukas 7 Asts: Sloukas 11; PIR: Sloukas 26	Boxscore	Pts: Claver 17; Rebs: Mirotić 11; Asts: Davies 4 PIR: Mirotić 24	Arena: Ülker Sports and Event Hall; Attendance: 12,592; Referees: Damir Javor, Joseph Bissang, Ioannis Foufis

16 January 2020	Maccabi Tel Aviv (Israel)	69–63	(Italy) A|X Armani Exchange Milan	Tel Aviv
20:05	Scoring by quarter: 15–21, 16–11, 21–16, 17–15
	Pts: Wilbekin 22; Rebs: Hunter 14; Asts: Wilbekin 4 PIR: Hunter 29	Boxscore	Pts: Sykes 11; Rebs: Gudaitis 9 Asts: four players 2 PIR: Nedović 11	Arena: Menora Mivtachim Arena; Attendance: 10,652; Referees: Juan Carlos García González, Milivoje Jovčić, Sérgio Silva

17 January 2020	CSKA Moscow (Russia)	94–90	(Spain) Kirolbet Baskonia	Moscow
18:00	Scoring by quarter: 27–25, 25–21, 23–12, 19–32
	Pts: James 33; Rebs: Hines, Voigtmann 5 Asts: Hines 4 PIR: James 34	Boxscore	Pts: Fall 19; Rebs: Fall 10; Asts: Shengelia 5 PIR: Fall 30	Arena: Megasport Arena; Attendance: 6,587; Referees: Robert Lottermoser, Fernando Rocha, Igor Dragojević

17 January 2020	Zenit Saint Petersburg (Russia)	81–86	(Spain) Valencia Basket	Saint Petersburg
18:00	Scoring by quarter: 16–20, 26–26, 9–17, 30–23
	Pts: Albicy 18; Rebs: Iverson 7 Asts: Albicy 4 PIR: Albicy 18	Boxscore	Pts: Marinković 14; Rebs: Ndour 5 Asts: Van Rossom 8 PIR: Ndour 23	Arena: Sibur Arena; Attendance: 4,730; Referees: Carmelo Paternicò, Mehdi Difallah, Spiros Gkontas

17 January 2020	Anadolu Efes (Turkey)	101–74	(France) LDLC ASVEL	Istanbul
18:30	Scoring by quarter: 35–22, 25–23, 21–18, 20–11
	Pts: Larkin 29; Rebs: Larkin, Şanlı 6 Asts: Larkin 7 PIR: Larkin 45	Boxscore	Pts: Noua 16; Rebs: Jean-Charles, Maledon 6 Asts: Maledon 10; PIR: Payne 17	Arena: Sinan Erdem Dome; Attendance: 12,763; Referees: Oļegs Latiševs, Anne Panther, Josip Radojković

17 January 2020	Crvena zvezda mts (Serbia)	85–94(OT)	(Germany) ALBA Berlin	Belgrade
19:00	Scoring by quarter: 22–21, 21–18, 19–23, 17–17, Overtime: 6–15
	Pts: Punter 24; Rebs: Štimac 6 Asts: Baron, L. Brown 3 PIR: Punter 26	Boxscore	Pts: Sikma, Siva 15; Rebs: Sikma 10; Asts: Sikma 4 PIR: Sikma 25	Arena: Štark Arena; Attendance: 14,376; Referees: Christos Christodoulou, Marcin Kowalski, Jurgis Laurinavičius

17 January 2020	Olympiacos (Greece)	89–72	(Germany) Bayern Munich	Piraeus
20:30	Scoring by quarter: 17–14, 20–18, 17–21, 35–19
	Pts: Vezenkov 20; Rebs: Printezis 6 Asts: Rochestie 12; PIR: Vezenkov 24	Boxscore	Pts: Bray, Lučić 15; Rebs: Monroe 12; Asts: Lô, Lučić 5 PIR: Lučić, Monroe 19	Arena: Peace and Friendship Stadium; Attendance: 7,121; Referees: Borys Ryzhyk, Emin Moğulkoç, Eduard Udyanskyy

17 January 2020	Panathinaikos OPAP (Greece)	96–94	(Lithuania) Žalgiris	Athens
20:30	Scoring by quarter: 18–27, 28–22, 25–17, 25–28
	Pts: Rice 20; Rebs: Thomas 8 Asts: Calathes 11; PIR: Rice 26	Boxscore	Pts: Lekavičius, Walkup 16; Rebs: Landale 7 Asts: Walkup 7 PIR: Walkup 20	Arena: O.A.K.A. Attendance: 9,513; Referees: Ilija Belošević, Carlos Cortés, Piotr Pastusiak

=== Round 21 ===
23 January 2020	CSKA Moscow (Russia)	81–70	(Spain) Valencia Basket	Moscow
18:00	Scoring by quarter: 20–17, 22–22, 18–17, 21–14
	Pts: Voigtmann 19; Rebs: Voigtmann 10; Asts: James 5 PIR: Voigtmann 26	Boxscore	Pts: Van Rossom 16; Rebs: Dubljević, Labeyrie 8 Asts: Colom, Doornekamp 4 PIR: Doornekamp, Dubljević 12	Arena: Megasport Arena; Attendance: 6,479; Referees: Saša Pukl, Anne Panther, Sérgio Silva

23 January 2020	Zenit Saint Petersburg (Russia)	91–87	(Greece) Olympiacos	Saint Petersburg
18:00	Scoring by quarter: 24–27, 21–16, 21–15, 25–29
	Pts: Voronov 21; Rebs: Iverson 12; Asts: Albicy 8 PIR: Voronov 18	Boxscore	Pts: Spanoulis 31; Rebs: Printezis 7 Asts: Spanoulis 7 PIR: Spanoulis 33	Arena: Sibur Arena; Attendance: 4,023; Referees: Luigi Lamonica, Emilio Pérez Pizarro, Ingus Baumanis

23 January 2020	Bayern Munich (Germany)	80–68	(Israel) Maccabi Tel Aviv	Munich
20:30	Scoring by quarter: 23–12, 12–21, 22–20, 23–15
	Pts: Đedović 19; Rebs: Monroe 10; Asts: three players 3 PIR: Zipser 24	Boxscore	Pts: Bryant 14; Rebs: Hunter 7 Asts: Wilbekin 8 PIR: Jackson 18	Arena: Audi Dome; Attendance: 3,980; Referees: Miguel Ángel Pérez Pérez, Damir Javor, Mykola Ambrosov

23 January 2020	Barcelona (Spain)	86–82	(Serbia) Crvena zvezda mts	Barcelona
21:00	Scoring by quarter: 29–19, 12–23, 21–24, 24–16
	Pts: Mirotić 25; Rebs: Mirotić 6 Asts: Delaney 5 PIR: Mirotić 25	Boxscore	Pts: L. Brown 15; Rebs: Gist 6 Asts: L. Brown 8 PIR: L. Brown 19	Arena: Palau Blaugrana; Attendance: 5,427; Referees: Oļegs Latiševs, Piotr Pastusiak, Seffi Shemmesh

23 January 2020	Kirolbet Baskonia (Spain)	83–79	(Russia) Khimki	Vitoria-Gasteiz
21:00	Scoring by quarter: 27–25, 20–19, 14–19, 22–16
	Pts: Shields 22; Rebs: Polonara 11; Asts: Henry 8 PIR: Shields 29	Boxscore	Pts: Shved 18; Rebs: Jerebko 6 Asts: Shved 5 PIR: Jerebko 17	Arena: Buesa Arena; Attendance: 11,739; Referees: Borys Ryzhyk, Elias Koromilas, Joseph Bissang

24 January 2020	Fenerbahçe Beko (Turkey)	73–64	(Italy) A|X Armani Exchange Milan	Istanbul
18:45	Scoring by quarter: 24–15, 17–16, 15–16, 17–17
	Pts: Datome 14; Rebs: Datome 6 Asts: Sloukas 7 PIR: Veselý 18	Boxscore	Pts: Tarczewski 19; Rebs: Tarczewski 9 Asts: Rodríguez 6 PIR: Tarczewski 27	Arena: Ülker Sports and Event Hall; Attendance: 11,697; Referees: Christos Christodoulou, Carlos Peruga, Sašo Petek

24 January 2020	Žalgiris (Lithuania)	104–80	(Germany) ALBA Berlin	Kaunas
19:00	Scoring by quarter: 23–9, 31–18, 30–25, 20–28
	Pts: Rivers 17; Rebs: Hayes, Landale 7 Asts: Walkup 7 PIR: Hayes 19	Boxscore	Pts: Nnoko 15; Rebs: Nnoko 7 Asts: Siva 4 PIR: Nnoko 27	Arena: Žalgirio Arena; Attendance: 14,869; Referees: Carmelo Paternicò, Tomislav Hordov, Milan Nedović

24 January 2020	Panathinaikos OPAP (Greece)	100–88	(France) LDLC ASVEL	Athens
20:30	Scoring by quarter: 20–18, 32–17, 21–23, 27–30
	Pts: Fredette 22; Rebs: Papagiannis 8 Asts: Calathes 17; PIR: Calathes 27	Boxscore	Pts: Maledon 19; Rebs: Jean-Charles, Jekiri 6 Asts: Payne 3 PIR: Maledon 19	Arena: O.A.K.A. Attendance: 8,131; Referees: Matej Boltauzer, Juan Carlos García González, Jakub Zamojski

24 January 2020	Real Madrid (Spain)	75–80	(Turkey) Anadolu Efes	Madrid
21:00	Scoring by quarter: 20–20, 20–23, 15–16, 20–21
	Pts: Thompkins 15; Rebs: Tavares 12; Asts: Llull 5 PIR: Tavares 20	Boxscore	Pts: Larkin 32; Rebs: Singleton 7 Asts: Larkin, Simon 4 PIR: Larkin 36	Arena: WiZink Center; Attendance: 11,338; Referees: Ilija Belošević, Sreten Radović, Gytis Vilius

=== Round 22 ===
30 January 2020	Khimki (Russia)	69–78	(Russia) CSKA Moscow	Mytishchi
18:00	Scoring by quarter: 19–23, 13–17, 6–19, 31–19
	Pts: Shved 27; Rebs: Booker 10; Asts: Shved 6 PIR: Shved 25	Boxscore	Pts: James 21; Rebs: Voigtmann 14; Asts: Kurbanov 4 PIR: Voigtmann 20	Arena: Mytishchi Arena; Attendance: 6,389; Referees: Daniel Hierrezuelo, Piotr Pastusiak, Milan Nedović

30 January 2020	ALBA Berlin (Germany)	70–74	(Turkey) Fenerbahçe Beko	Berlin
20:00	Scoring by quarter: 22–17, 19–16, 15–17, 14–24
	Pts: Giedraitis 14; Rebs: Nnoko 6 Asts: Sikma 8 PIR: Giedraitis 18	Boxscore	Pts: Sloukas 16; Rebs: Veselý 6 Asts: Sloukas 5 PIR: Veselý 23	Arena: Mercedes-Benz Arena; Attendance: 12,122; Referees: Saša Pukl, Tomasz Trawicki, Aare Halliko

30 January 2020	Olympiacos (Greece)	80–70	(Spain) Kirolbet Baskonia	Piraeus
20:00	Scoring by quarter: 25–24, 18–13, 16–14, 21–19
	Pts: Rubit 19; Rebs: Ellis, Rubit 7 Asts: Baldwin 6 PIR: Rubit 23	Boxscore	Pts: three players 14; Rebs: García 6 Asts: Shengelia 7 PIR: Shengelia 18	Arena: Peace and Friendship Stadium; Attendance: 5,730; Referees: Damir Javor, Mehdi Difallah, Amit Balak

30 January 2020	Maccabi Tel Aviv (Israel)	77–81	(Spain) Real Madrid	Tel Aviv
20:05	Scoring by quarter: 19–21, 19–15, 11–21, 28–24
	Pts: Wilbekin 21; Rebs: Hunter 6 Asts: Jackson, Wilbekin 4 PIR: Wilbekin 22	Boxscore	Pts: Randolph 19; Rebs: Tavares 10; Asts: Campazzo 8 PIR: Randolph 23	Arena: Menora Mivtachim Arena; Attendance: 10,689; Referees: Luigi Lamonica, Fernando Rocha, Uroš Nikolić

30 January 2020	LDLC ASVEL (France)	74–79	(Lithuania) Žalgiris	Villeurbanne
20:45	Scoring by quarter: 16–16, 11–14, 23–25, 24–24
	Pts: Taylor 15; Rebs: Jekiri 7 Asts: Maledon 5 PIR: Lighty 17	Boxscore	Pts: Lekavičius 21; Rebs: LeDay, Walkup 6 Asts: Walkup 4 PIR: Walkup 21	Arena: Astroballe; Attendance: 5,171; Referees: Miguel Ángel Pérez Pérez, Sašo Petek, Vasiliki Tsaroucha

30 January 2020	Barcelona (Spain)	90–72	(Russia) Zenit Saint Petersburg	Barcelona
21:00	Scoring by quarter: 21–21, 32–14, 21–19, 16–18
	Pts: Delaney, Kuric 21; Rebs: three players 4 Asts: Heurtel 7 PIR: Kuric 21	Boxscore	Pts: Albicy 16; Rebs: Ayón 10; Asts: four players 3 PIR: Albicy 23	Arena: Palau Blaugrana; Attendance: 5,893; Referees: Christos Christodoulou, Miloš Koljenšić, Jakub Zamojski

30 January 2020	A|X Armani Exchange Milan (Italy)	79–78	(Germany) Bayern Munich	Assago
21:15	Scoring by quarter: 21–26, 17–19, 15–21, 26–12
	Pts: Micov 16; Rebs: Gudaitis 7 Asts: Rodríguez 10; PIR: Rodríguez 16	Boxscore	Pts: Barthel 18; Rebs: Zipser 6 Asts: Monroe 6 PIR: Zipser 20	Arena: Mediolanum Forum; Attendance: 7,991; Referees: Matej Boltauzer, Oļegs Latiševs, Sinan İşgüder

31 January 2020	Crvena zvezda mts (Serbia)	78–85	(Turkey) Anadolu Efes	Belgrade
19:00	Scoring by quarter: 16–24, 14–27, 28–21, 20–13
	Pts: Davidovac 15; Rebs: Štimac 9 Asts: L. Brown 9 PIR: Štimac 18	Boxscore	Pts: Larkin 24; Rebs: Pleiss 8 Asts: Micić 5 PIR: Larkin 23	Arena: Štark Arena; Attendance: 14,820; Referees: Juan Carlos García González, Carmelo Paternicò, Robert Vyklický

31 January 2020	Valencia Basket (Spain)	94–87	(Greece) Panathinaikos OPAP	Valencia
21:00	Scoring by quarter: 27–25, 28–20, 25–19, 14–23
	Pts: Dubljević 19; Rebs: Dubljević 7 Asts: Colom 6 PIR: Dubljević 26	Boxscore	Pts: Calathes 22; Rebs: Calathes, Papagiannis 10; Asts: Calathes 5 PIR: Calathes 25	Arena: La Fonteta; Attendance: 7,817; Referees: Borys Ryzhyk, Milivoje Jovčić, Gytis Vilius

=== Round 23 ===
4 February 2020	CSKA Moscow (Russia)	80–82	(Turkey) Anadolu Efes	Moscow
18:00	Scoring by quarter: 16–25, 21–16, 20–17, 23–24
	Pts: James 20; Rebs: Hines 11; Asts: three players 3 PIR: Hines 17	Boxscore	Pts: Larkin 23; Rebs: Anderson 5 Asts: Micić 5 PIR: Micić 24	Arena: Megasport Arena; Attendance: 8,871; Referees: Luigi Lamonica, Sašo Petek, Carlos Peruga

4 February 2020	Žalgiris (Lithuania)	94–69	(Greece) Olympiacos	Kaunas
19:00	Scoring by quarter: 22–17, 24–20, 23–11, 25–21
	Pts: Milaknis 19; Rebs: LeDay 6 Asts: Jokubaitis, Ulanovas 6 PIR: Walkup 16	Boxscore	Pts: Vezenkov 15; Rebs: Milutinov 13; Asts: Paul 5 PIR: Milutinov 23	Arena: Žalgirio Arena; Attendance: 14,875; Referees: Robert Lottermoser, Oļegs Latiševs, Jordi Aliaga

4 February 2020	LDLC ASVEL (France)	75–65	(Germany) Bayern Munich	Villeurbanne
20:45	Scoring by quarter: 16–18, 18–17, 20–16, 21–14
	Pts: Payne, Taylor 15; Rebs: Payne 8 Asts: Taylor 8 PIR: Payne 20	Boxscore	Pts: Lessort, Lučić 14; Rebs: Monroe 7 Asts: Bray 6 PIR: Lučić 17	Arena: Astroballe; Attendance: 5,284; Referees: Carmelo Paternicò, Emilio Pérez Pizarro, Tomasz Trawicki

4 February 2020	A|X Armani Exchange Milan (Italy)	96–102	(Germany) ALBA Berlin	Assago
20:45	Scoring by quarter: 25–27, 20–18, 28–30, 23–27
	Pts: Micov 20; Rebs: Tarczewski 7 Asts: Rodríguez 9 PIR: Rodríguez 25	Boxscore	Pts: Eriksson 22; Rebs: Cavanaugh 7 Asts: Siva 7 PIR: Eriksson, Sikma 19	Arena: Mediolanum Forum; Attendance: 6,599; Referees: Damir Javor, Seffi Shemmesh, Josip Radojković

4 February 2020	Real Madrid (Spain)	70–69	(Spain) Kirolbet Baskonia	Madrid
21:00	Scoring by quarter: 14–19, 23–19, 16–11, 17–20
	Pts: Thompkins 20; Rebs: Thompkins 6 Asts: Campazzo 11; PIR: Campazzo 21	Boxscore	Pts: Shields 14; Rebs: Fall 7 Asts: Christon, Shengelia 4 PIR: Shields 14	Arena: WiZink Center; Attendance: 8,465; Referees: Saša Pukl, Emin Moğulkoç, Petri Mäntylä

5 February 2020	Zenit Saint Petersburg (Russia)	68–73	(Turkey) Fenerbahçe Beko	Saint Petersburg
18:00	Scoring by quarter: 15–19, 17–22, 18–13, 18–19
	Pts: Hollins, Ayón 16; Rebs: three players 5 Asts: Albicy 5 PIR: Ayón 20	Boxscore	Pts: Westermann 13; Rebs: Thomas 5 Asts: Westermann, Sloukas 4 PIR: Veselý 19	Arena: Yubileyny Sports Palace; Attendance: 4,207; Referees: Daniel Hierrezuelo, Milan Nedović, Uroš Nikolić

5 February 2020	Crvena zvezda mts (Serbia)	78–73	(Greece) Panathinaikos OPAP	Belgrade
19:00	Scoring by quarter: 9–21, 26–11, 11–25, 32–16
	Pts: Punter 24; Rebs: Ojo 7 Asts: Jenkins 5 PIR: Punter 28	Boxscore	Pts: Papagiannis, Thomas 12; Rebs: Mitoglou 10; Asts: Calathes 5 PIR: Mitoglou 17	Arena: Štark Arena; Attendance: 12,867; Referees: Miguel Ángel Pérez Pérez, Mehdi Difallah, Eduard Udyanskyy

5 February 2020	Maccabi Tel Aviv (Israel)	80–77	(Russia) Khimki	Tel Aviv
20:05	Scoring by quarter: 20–28, 16–19, 24–13, 20–17
	Pts: Bryant 21; Rebs: Avdija 9 Asts: Avdija, Bryant 4 PIR: Bryant 21	Boxscore	Pts: Shved 18; Rebs: Booker, Monia 6 Asts: Shved 10; PIR: Jerebko 22	Arena: Menora Mivtachim Arena; Attendance: 10,470; Referees: Jakub Zamojski, Robert Vyklický, Miloš Koljenšić

5 February 2020	Valencia Basket (Spain)	76–77	(Spain) Barcelona	Valencia
21:00	Scoring by quarter: 21–18, 22–19, 23–16, 10–24
	Pts: San Emeterio 17; Rebs: Dubljević 13; Asts: four players 3 PIR: San Emeterio 22	Boxscore	Pts: Mirotić 26; Rebs: Claver, Oriola 5 Asts: Hanga 6 PIR: Mirotić 32	Arena: La Fonteta; Attendance: 7,840; Referees: Matej Boltauzer, Fernando Rocha, Hugues Thépénier

=== Round 24 ===
6 February 2020	Anadolu Efes (Turkey)	96–91	(Lithuania) Žalgiris	Istanbul
18:30	Scoring by quarter: 19–20, 21–23, 23–22, 33–26
	Pts: Larkin 25; Rebs: Moerman, Singleton 5 Asts: Larkin 4 PIR: Larkin 27	Boxscore	Pts: LeDay 22; Rebs: LeDay 6 Asts: Walkup 8 PIR: LeDay 23	Arena: Sinan Erdem Dome; Attendance: 14,803; Referees: Christos Christodoulou, Emilio Perez, Sergio Silva

6 February 2020	ALBA Berlin (Germany)	97–103	(Spain) Real Madrid	Berlin
20:00	Scoring by quarter: 25–41, 35–9, 11–29, 26–24
	Pts: Giedraitis 17; Rebs: Nnoko, Sikma 7 Asts: Sikma 8 PIR: Giedraitis 20	Boxscore	Pts: Carroll, Randolph 27; Rebs: Tavares 8 Asts: Campazzo 19; PIR: Randolph 33	Arena: Mercedes-Benz Arena; Attendance: 10,457; Referees: Olegs Latisevs, Mario Majkic, Uros Obrknezevic

6 February 2020	Olympiacos (Greece)	72–59	(Russia) CSKA Moscow	Piraeus
20:00	Scoring by quarter: 20–15, 13–19, 21–4, 18–21
	Pts: Papanikolaou 19; Rebs: Milutinov 12; Asts: Baldwin, Paul 4 PIR: Papanikolaou 27	Boxscore	Pts: James 20; Rebs: James 7 Asts: James 5 PIR: James 23	Arena: Peace and Friendship Stadium; Attendance: 6,357; Referees: Sreten Radovic, Carmelo Paternico, Carlos Cortes

6 February 2020	Kirolbet Baskonia (Spain)	79–65	(France) LDLC ASVEL	Vitoria-Gasteiz
21:00	Scoring by quarter: 20–13, 19–24, 23–14, 17–14
	Pts: Shengelia 15; Rebs: Shengelia 9 Asts: Christon 11; PIR: three players 15	Boxscore	Pts: Payne 16; Rebs: Jekiri 5 Asts: four players 3 PIR: Payne 16	Arena: Buesa Arena; Attendance: 9,549; Referees: Milivoje Jovčić, Piotr Pastusiak, Petros Papapetrou

7 February 2020	Khimki (Russia)	78–72	(Serbia) Crvena zvezda mts	Mytishchi
18:00	Scoring by quarter: 28–18, 20–18, 16–15, 14–21
	Pts: Shved 22; Rebs: Jerebko 8 Asts: Shved 9 PIR: Shved 23	Boxscore	Pts: Punter 20; Rebs: Davidovac 7 Asts: Dobrić 4 PIR: Dobrić 17	Arena: Mytishchi Arena; Attendance: 5,629; Referees: Fernando Rocha, Emin Moğulkoç, Carlos Peruga

7 February 2020	Fenerbahçe Beko (Turkey)	77–78	(Israel) Maccabi Tel Aviv	Istanbul
18:45	Scoring by quarter: 23–20, 17–21, 23–23, 14–14
	Pts: Williams 22; Rebs: Veselý 8 Asts: Sloukas, Veselý 4 PIR: Williams 29	Boxscore	Pts: Avdija, Hunter 13; Rebs: three players 3 Asts: Bryant, Caloiaro 4 PIR: Caloiaro 17	Arena: Ülker Sports and Event Hall; Attendance: 10,527; Referees: Robert Lottermoser, Matej Boltauzer, Emilio Pérez Pizarro

7 February 2020	Bayern Munich (Germany)	59–66	(Spain) Valencia Basket	Munich
20:30	Scoring by quarter: 13–15, 17–9, 16–21, 13–21
	Pts: Monroe 15; Rebs: Monroe 6 Asts: Šiško 6 PIR: Monroe 15	Boxscore	Pts: Doornekamp, Tobey 11; Rebs: Tobey 6 Asts: Colom 5 PIR: Doornekamp 14	Arena: Audi Dome; Attendance: 4,412; Referees: Luigi Lamonica, Sašo Petek, Josip Radojković

7 February 2020	Panathinaikos OPAP (Greece)	96–81	(Russia) Zenit Saint Petersburg	Athens
20:30	Scoring by quarter: 30–11, 16–29, 25–20, 25–21
	Pts: Thomas 27; Rebs: Papagiannis 8 Asts: Calathes 9 PIR: Thomas 30	Boxscore	Pts: Ayón 21; Rebs: Ponkrashov 5 Asts: Albicy 7 PIR: Ayón 21	Arena: O.A.K.A. Attendance: 6,713; Referees: Sreten Radović, Robert Vyklický, Michele Rossi

7 February 2020	Barcelona (Spain)	84–80	(Italy) A|X Armani Exchange Milan	Barcelona
21:00	Scoring by quarter: 23–17, 13–28, 27–14, 21–21
	Pts: Delaney 26; Rebs: Tomić 7 Asts: Delaney 9 PIR: Delaney 37	Boxscore	Pts: Rodríguez 14; Rebs: Tarczewski 9 Asts: Rodríguez 5 PIR: Tarczewski 18	Arena: Palau Blaugrana; Attendance: 7,013; Referees: Ilija Belošević, Mehdi Difallah, Gytis Vilius

=== Round 25 ===
20 February 2020	Zenit Saint Petersburg (Russia)	81–83	(Germany) ALBA Berlin	Saint Petersburg
18:00	Scoring by quarter: 25–15, 17–23, 22–20, 17–25
	Pts: Thomas 19; Rebs: Abromaitis, Ayón 7 Asts: Albicy 6 PIR: Thomas 32	Boxscore	Pts: Hermannsson 24; Rebs: Sikma 9 Asts: Hermannsson 7 PIR: Hermannsson 27	Arena: Sibur Arena; Attendance: 3,732; Referees: Milivoje Jovčić, Gytis Vilius, Ioannis Foufis

20 February 2020	Fenerbahçe Beko (Turkey)	65–94	(Spain) Real Madrid	Istanbul
18:45	Scoring by quarter: 15–22, 16–25, 20–24, 14–23
	Pts: de Colo 21; Rebs: Kalinić 4 Asts: de Colo 6 PIR: de Colo 23	Boxscore	Pts: Carroll 20; Rebs: Tavares 8 Asts: Campazzo 8 PIR: Carroll, Tavares 19	Arena: Ülker Sports and Event Hall; Attendance: 12,705; Referees: Ilija Belošević, Borys Ryzhyk, Carmelo Paternicò

20 February 2020	Olympiacos (Greece)	77–68	(France) LDLC ASVEL	Piraeus
18:15	Scoring by quarter: 20–21, 23–12, 18–17, 16–18
	Pts: Vezenkov 15; Rebs: Baldwin, Vezenkov 7 Asts: Papanikolaou 6 PIR: Ellis 19	Boxscore	Pts: Kahudi 14; Rebs: Jean-Charles, Jekiri 8 Asts: Diot, Taylor 4 PIR: Jekiri 14	Arena: Peace and Friendship Stadium; Attendance: 7,233; Referees: Fernando Rocha, Carlos Peruga, Anne Panther

20 February 2020	A|X Armani Exchange Milan (Italy)	69–78	(Russia) Khimki	Assago
20:45	Scoring by quarter: 16–21, 22–18, 13–20, 18–19
	Pts: Rodríguez 18; Rebs: Tarczewski 9 Asts: Rodríguez 8 PIR: Rodríguez 22	Boxscore	Pts: Shved 18; Rebs: Jerebko 12; Asts: Shved 6 PIR: Jerebko 19	Arena: Mediolanum Forum; Attendance: 7,457; Referees: Robert Lottermoser, Miguel Ángel Pérez Pérez, Mario Majkić

20 February 2020	Kirolbet Baskonia (Spain)	60–74	(Lithuania) Žalgiris	Vitoria-Gasteiz
21:00	Scoring by quarter: 17–13, 18–17, 10–21, 15–23
	Pts: Christon 17; Rebs: Shields 5 Asts: Shengelia, Shields 5 PIR: Shengelia 14	Boxscore	Pts: Ulanovas 15; Rebs: Ulanovas 7 Asts: Walkup 6 PIR: LeDay 16	Arena: Buesa Arena; Attendance: 10,068; Referees: Matej Boltauzer, Spiros Gkontas, Miloš Koljenšić

21 February 2020	Crvena zvezda mts (Serbia)	81–86	(Russia) CSKA Moscow	Belgrade
19:00	Scoring by quarter: 17–16, 20–20, 16–24, 28–26
	Pts: Baron 15; Rebs: Ojo 5 Asts: L. Brown, Gist 4 PIR: Gist 18	Boxscore	Pts: James 29; Rebs: Hines 10; Asts: James, Voigtmann 3 PIR: James 21	Arena: Štark Arena; Attendance: 13,457; Referees: Emilio Pérez Pizarro, Jakub Zamojski, Mykola Ambrosov

21 February 2020	Bayern Munich (Germany)	63–88	(Turkey) Anadolu Efes	Munich
20:30	Scoring by quarter: 17–19, 8–18, 23–25, 15–26
	Pts: Lô, Lučić 14; Rebs: Monroe 8 Asts: Monroe 4 PIR: Lučić 15	Boxscore	Pts: Beaubois 16; Rebs: Anderson 6 Asts: Micić 8 PIR: Micić 21	Arena: Audi Dome; Attendance: 4,850; Referees: Daniel Hierrezuelo, Tomislav Hordov, Marko Juras

21 February 2020	Panathinaikos OPAP (Greece)	81–92	(Spain) Barcelona	Athens
20:30	Scoring by quarter: 23–20, 22–18, 24–29, 12–25
	Pts: Papagiannis 14; Rebs: Papagiannis 8 Asts: Calathes 11; PIR: Papagiannis 21	Boxscore	Pts: Mirotić 20; Rebs: Mirotić 9 Asts: Delaney 6 PIR: Mirotić 23	Arena: O.A.K.A. Attendance: 11.003; Referees: Luigi Lamonica, Damir Javor, Emin Moğulkoç

21 February 2020	Valencia Basket (Spain)	82–85	(Israel) Maccabi Tel Aviv	Valencia
21:00	Scoring by quarter: 19–18, 19–15, 23–25, 21–27
	Pts: Dubljević 19; Rebs: Tobey 6 Asts: Colom 9 PIR: Dubljević 20	Boxscore	Pts: Wilbekin 20; Rebs: Hunter 9 Asts: Dorsey 5 PIR: Dorsey 25	Arena: La Fonteta; Attendance: 7,807; Referees: Sreten Radović, Mehdi Difallah, Tomasz Trawicki

=== Round 26 ===
24 February 2020	Real Madrid (Spain)	96–78	(Greece) Panathinaikos OPAP	Madrid
21:00	Scoring by quarter: 27–16, 21–25, 25–24, 23–13
	Pts: Tavares 15; Rebs: Tavares 10; Asts: Campazzo 10; PIR: Tavares 30	Boxscore	Pts: Calathes 13; Rebs: Papapetrou 6 Asts: Calathes 6 PIR: Thomas 15	Arena: WiZink Center; Attendance: 9,893; Referees: Robert Lottermoser, Matej Boltauzer, Tomislav Hordov

27 February 2020	Zenit Saint Petersburg (Russia)	68–77	(Germany) Bayern Munich	Saint Petersburg
18:00	Scoring by quarter: 20–19, 16–21, 18–20, 14–17
	Pts: Hollins 18; Rebs: Abromaitis 6 Asts: Khvostov 6 PIR: Ayón 24	Boxscore	Pts: Monroe 26; Rebs: Monroe 8 Asts: Lô 8 PIR: Monroe 31	Arena: Sibur Arena; Attendance: 4,689; Referees: Sasa Pukl, Petri Mantyla, Rain Peerandi

27 February 2020	CSKA Moscow (Russia)	80–82	(Spain) Barcelona	Moscow
18:00	Scoring by quarter: 15–18, 25–19, 20–26, 20–19
	Pts: Hackett 17; Rebs: Bolomboy 7 Asts: Hackett, James 4 PIR: Hilliard 22	Boxscore	Pts: Mirotić 23; Rebs: Mirotić 8 Asts: three players 3 PIR: Mirotić 32	Arena: Megasport Arena; Attendance: 11,355; Referees: Robert Lottermoser, Christos Christodoulou, Uros Nikolic

27 February 2020	ALBA Berlin (Germany)	86–99	(Turkey) Anadolu Efes	Berlin
20:00	Scoring by quarter: 21–32, 26–18, 18–29, 21–20
	Pts: Hermannsson 19; Rebs: Sikma 7 Asts: Hermannsson, Sikma 8 PIR: Hermannsson 20	Boxscore	Pts: Micić 23; Rebs: Moerman 7 Asts: Micić 9 PIR: Micić 35	Arena: Mercedes-Benz Arena; Attendance: 9,343; Referees: Sreten Radovic, Fernando Rocha, Saulius Racys

27 February 2020	Maccabi Tel Aviv (Israel)	71–70	(Greece) Olympiacos	Tel Aviv
20:05	Scoring by quarter: 20−16, 19−13, 13−21, 19−20
	Pts: Wilbekin 21; Rebs: Reynolds 6 Asts: Wilbekin, Dorsey 4 PIR: Wilbekin, Hunter 15	Boxscore	Pts: McKissic 14; Rebs: Papanikolaou, Ellis 7 Asts: four players 2 PIR: Baldwin IV 17	Arena: Menora Mivtachim Arena; Attendance: 10,652; Referees: Ilija Belosevic, Borys Ryzhyk, Gytis Vilius

27 February 2020	Kirolbet Baskonia (Spain)	71–56	(Serbia) Crvena zvezda mts	Vitoria-Gasteiz
20:45	Scoring by quarter: 21−15, 18−13, 15−15, 17−13
	Pts: Shengelia 18; Rebs: Shields 6 Asts: Shields 5 PIR: Shields 23	Boxscore	Pts: Štimac 13; Rebs: Štimac 7 Asts: Baron 4 PIR: Štimac 16	Arena: Buesa Arena; Attendance: 9,445; Referees: Luigi Lamonica, Anne Panther, Marcin Kowalski

28 February 2020	Khimki (Russia)	108–79	(France) LDLC ASVEL	Mytishchi
18:00	Scoring by quarter: 35−28, 30−14, 20−19, 23−18
	Pts: Shved 24; Rebs: Jerebko 7 Asts: Shved 13; PIR: Shved 37	Boxscore	Pts: Payne 14; Rebs: Payne 6 Asts: Maledon 5 PIR: Payne 20	Arena: Mytishchi Arena; Attendance: 4,891; Referees: Juan Carlos Garcia, Spiros Gkontas, Moritz Reiter

28 February 2020	Žalgiris (Lithuania)	105–97(OT)	(Italy) A|X Armani Exchange Milan	Kaunas
19:00	Scoring by quarter: 27−25, 26−19, 19−27, 19−20, Overtime: 14−6
	Pts: Hayes 21; Rebs: Ulanovas 6 Asts: Ulanovas 6 PIR: Hayes, Ulanovas 25	Boxscore	Pts: three players 18; Rebs: Micov 7 Asts: Rodriguez 8 PIR: Micov, Rodriguez 21	Arena: Žalgirio Arena; Attendance: 9,405; Referees: Daniel Hierrezuelo, Robert Vyklicky, Eduard Udyanskyy

28 February 2020	Valencia Basket (Spain)	86–93	(Turkey) Fenerbahçe Beko	Valencia
21:00	Scoring by quarter: 14−21, 27−26, 19−18, 26−28
	Pts: Marinković 22; Rebs: Tobey 6 Asts: Colom 5 PIR: Marinković 23	Boxscore	Pts: Williams 22; Rebs: Thomas 5 Asts: De Colo 5 PIR: Williams 24	Arena: La Fonteta; Attendance: 7,378; Referees: Olegs Latisevs, Piotr Pastusiak, Mario Majkic

=== Round 27 ===
3 March 2020	CSKA Moscow (Russia)	86–78	(Russia) Zenit Saint Petersburg	Moscow
18:00	Scoring by quarter: 23–21, 23–22, 20–15, 20–20
	Pts: James 27; Rebs: Voigtmann 6 Asts: James 5 PIR: James 26	Boxscore	Pts: Hollins 28; Rebs: Ayón 8 Asts: Khvostov, Renfroe 4 PIR: Hollins 24	Arena: Megasport Arena; Attendance: 4,852 (tentative); Referees: Borys Ryzhyk, Emin Mogulkoc, Hugues Thepenier

3 March 2020	Žalgiris (Lithuania)	96–85	(Russia) Khimki	Kaunas
19:00	Scoring by quarter: 29–15, 21–19, 14–24, 32–27
	Pts: LeDay 23; Rebs: three players 5 Asts: Walkup 7 PIR: LeDay 26	Boxscore	Pts: Shved 24; Rebs: Jerebko 10; Asts: Jović 7 PIR: Jerebko 25	Arena: Žalgirio Arena; Attendance: 13,551 (tentative); Referees: Sreten Radovic, Seffi Shemmesh, Michele Rossi

3 March 2020	Olympiacos (Greece)	81–78	(Greece) Panathinaikos OPAP	Piraeus
20:00	Scoring by quarter: 18–20, 27–19, 20–20, 16–19
	Pts: McKissic 22; Rebs: Ellis 10; Asts: three players 2 PIR: McKissic 15	Boxscore	Pts: Calathes 18; Rebs: three players 6 Asts: Rice 5 PIR: Calathes 22	Arena: Peace and Friendship Stadium; Attendance: 10,877 (tentative); Referees: Daniel Hierrenzuelo, Saso Petek, Uros Nikolic

3 March 2020	LDLC ASVEL (France)	72–65	(Spain) Valencia Basket	Villeurbanne
20:45	Scoring by quarter: 20–17, 18–13, 18–22, 16–13
	Pts: Lighty 20; Rebs: Jekiri, Yabusele 7 Asts: Taylor 5 PIR: Taylor 18	Boxscore	Pts: Vives 14; Rebs: Labeyrie 7 Asts: Abalde 5 PIR: Labeyrie 17	Arena: Astroballe; Attendance: 4,491 (tentative); Referees: Robert Lottermoser, Tomislav Hordov, Saulius Racys

3 March 2020	A|X Armani Exchange Milan (Italy)	73–78	(Spain) Real Madrid	Assago
20:45	Scoring by quarter: 25–11, 20–24, 10–11, 18–32
	Pts: Moraschini 21; Rebs: Micov, Moraschini 6 Asts: Micov 3 PIR: Moraschini 24	Boxscore	Pts: Fernández 16; Rebs: Tavares 12; Asts: Laprovíttola 6 PIR: Tavares 29	Arena: Mediolanum Forum; Attendance: 0 Referees: Christos Christodoulou, Fernando Rocha, Milos Koljensic

4 March 2020	Fenerbahçe Beko (Turkey)	66–63	(Serbia) Crvena zvezda mts	Istanbul
18:45	Scoring by quarter: 22–20, 19–17, 10–14, 15–12
	Pts: Kalinić 10; Rebs: Thomas, Williams 6 Asts: Westermann 4 PIR: Williams 19	Boxscore	Pts: Brown, Punter 14; Rebs: Štimac 7 Asts: Brown 3 PIR: Brown 15	Arena: Ülker Sports and Event Hall; Attendance: 7,315 (tentative); Referees: Juan Carlos García González, Spiros Gkontas, Gytis Vilius

4 March 2020	ALBA Berlin (Germany)	80–84	(Spain) Barcelona	Berlin
20:00	Scoring by quarter: 18–27, 28–11, 16–28, 18–18
	Pts: Hermannsson 17; Rebs: Nnoko 9 Asts: Sikma 4 PIR: Sikma 23	Boxscore	Pts: Abrines 17; Rebs: four players 5 Asts: Higgins 7 PIR: Abrines 21	Arena: Mercedes-Benz Arena; Attendance: 8,797 (tentative); Referees: Carmelo Paternico, Tomasz Trawicki, Rain Peerandi

4 March 2020	Maccabi Tel Aviv (Israel)	77–75	(Turkey) Anadolu Efes	Tel Aviv
20:05	Scoring by quarter: 21–11, 15–31, 21–17, 20–16
	Pts: Wilbekin 21; Rebs: Hunter 12; Asts: Wilbekin, Zoosman 4 PIR: Hunter 26	Boxscore	Pts: Simon, Micić 14; Rebs: Moerman, Singleton 7 Asts: Larkin 5 PIR: Moerman, Simon 17	Arena: Menora Mivtachim Arena; Attendance: 3,330 (tentative); Referees: Saša Pukl, Oļegs Latiševs, Anne Panther

4 March 2020	Bayern Munich (Germany)	71–80	(Spain) Kirolbet Baskonia	Munich
20:30	Scoring by quarter: 25–21, 16–23, 13–16, 17–20
	Pts: Monroe 18; Rebs: Monroe 6 Asts: Lô 4 PIR: Monroe 29	Boxscore	Pts: Eric 16; Rebs: Three players 4 Asts: Shengelia 5 PIR: Shengelia 18	Arena: Audi Dome; Attendance: 4,345 (tentative); Referees: Jakub Zamojski, Mehdi Difallah, Vasiliki Tsaroucha

=== Round 28 ===
5 March 2020	Zenit Saint Petersburg (Russia)	76–75(OT)	(Lithuania) Žalgiris	Saint Petersburg
18:00	Scoring by quarter: 12–27, 25–14, 10–12, 19–13, Overtime: 10–9
	Pts: Albicy 19; Rebs: Albicy, Ayón 5 Asts: Albicy 4 PIR: Albicy 24	Boxscore	Pts: Landale 27; Rebs: Jankūnas 9 Asts: Walkup 11; PIR: Landale 30	Arena: Sibur Arena; Attendance: 4,273; Referees: Luigi Lamonica, Joseph Bissang, Tomislav Hordov

5 March 2020	Panathinaikos OPAP (Greece)	66–97	(Russia) CSKA Moscow	Athens
20:00	Scoring by quarter: 22–32, 16–16, 13–17, 15–32
	Pts: Thomas 12; Rebs: Johnson 8 Asts: Calathes 7 PIR: Papapetrou, Vougioukas 11	Boxscore	Pts: Hilliard 21; Rebs: Hines 8 Asts: James 5 PIR: Hines 24	Arena: O.A.K.A. Attendance: 7,031; Referees: Fernando Rocha, Carlos Peruga, Milan Nedovic

5 March 2020	Real Madrid (Spain)	87–78	(France) LDLC ASVEL	Madrid
21:00	Scoring by quarter: 14–20, 25–18, 28–25, 20–15
	Pts: Carroll 19; Rebs: Tavares 8 Asts: Campazzo 7 PIR: Carroll 19	Boxscore	Pts: Jean-Charles 13; Rebs: Jekiri 11; Asts: Strazel 5 PIR: Jekiri 18	Arena: WiZink Center; Attendance: 7,019; Referees: Sreten Radović, Uroš Nikolić, Clemens Fritz

5 March 2020	Valencia Basket (Spain)	81–83(OT)	(Italy) A|X Armani Exchange Milan	Valencia
21:00	Scoring by quarter: 12–19, 16–17, 20–12, 17–17, Overtime: 16–18
	Pts: Abalde 21; Rebs: three players 6 Asts: Colom 7 PIR: Dubljević 31	Boxscore	Pts: Rodríguez 16; Rebs: Micov 7 Asts: Rodríguez 9 PIR: Rodríguez 20	Arena: La Fonteta; Attendance: 0 Referees: Borys Ryzhyk, Damir Javor, Emin Moğulkoç

6 March 2020	Khimki (Russia)	82–68	(Turkey) Fenerbahçe Beko	Mytishchi
18:00	Scoring by quarter: 26–18, 15–22, 23–14, 18–14
	Pts: Shved 23; Rebs: Jerebko 9 Asts: Jović 7 PIR: Jerebko 27	Boxscore	Pts: Muhammed 13; Rebs: Veselý 5 Asts: De Colo 3 PIR: Muhammed 15	Arena: Mytishchi Arena; Attendance: 4,873; Referees: Daniel Hierrenzuelo, Mehdi Difallah, Tomasz Trawicki

6 March 2020	Anadolu Efes (Turkey)	91–79	(Greece) Olympiacos	Istanbul
18:30	Scoring by quarter: 29–24, 22–17, 21–14, 19–24
	Pts: Larkin 40; Rebs: Pleiß 5 Asts: Micić 9 PIR: Larkin 44	Boxscore	Pts: Ellis 14; Rebs: four players 4 Asts: Buycks 8 PIR: Buycks 19	Arena: Sinan Erdem Dome; Attendance: 15,022; Referees: Robert Lottermoser, Juan Carlos Garcia, Jakub Zamojski

6 March 2020	Crvena zvezda mts (Serbia)	92–78	(Israel) Maccabi Tel Aviv	Belgrade
19:00	Scoring by quarter: 27–20, 22–23, 30–15, 13–20
	Pts: Baron, Punter 22; Rebs: Štimac 12; Asts: Brown 9 PIR: Baron 26	Boxscore	Pts: Dorsey 19; Rebs: Reynolds 10; Asts: Wilbekin 4 PIR: Wilbekin 16	Arena: Štark Arena; Attendance: 7,369; Referees: Carmelo Paternico, Robert Vyklicky, Jordi Aliaga

6 March 2020	Barcelona (Spain)	83–80	(Germany) Bayern Munich	Barcelona
21:00	Scoring by quarter: 21–21, 21–20, 15–27, 24–12
	Pts: Mirotić 28; Rebs: Mirotić 8 Asts: Higgins, Mirotić 4 PIR: Mirotić 37	Boxscore	Pts: Monroe 19; Rebs: Monroe 8 Asts: Zipser 4 PIR: Lučić 19	Arena: Palau Blaugrana; Attendance: 5,788; Referees: Matej Boltauzer, Milivoje Jovčić, Michele Rossi

6 March 2020	Kirolbet Baskonia (Spain)	73–72	(Germany) ALBA Berlin	Vitoria-Gasteiz
21:00	Scoring by quarter: 15–15, 14–24, 19–20, 25–13
	Pts: Shengelia 24; Rebs: Shengelia 7 Asts: Henry 6 PIR: Shengelia 28	Boxscore	Pts: Eriksson 16; Rebs: Cavanaugh 8 Asts: Hermannsson, Sikma 6 PIR: Eriksson, Sikma 14	Arena: Buesa Arena; Attendance: 8,725; Referees: Christos Christodoulou, Sašo Petek, Sebastien Clivaz

=== Round 29 ===
12 March 2020	CSKA Moscow (Russia)	vs.	(Germany) ALBA Berlin	Moscow
18:00
		Boxscore		Arena: Megasport Arena

12 March 2020	Anadolu Efes (Turkey)	vs.	(Spain) Valencia Basket	Istanbul
18:30
		Boxscore		Arena: Sinan Erdem Dome

12 March 2020	Maccabi Tel Aviv (Israel)	vs.	(Spain) Kirolbet Baskonia	Tel Aviv
20:05
		Boxscore		Arena: Menora Mivtachim Arena

12 March 2020	A|X Armani Exchange Milan (Italy)	vs.	(Greece) Olympiacos	Assago
20:45
		Boxscore		Arena: Mediolanum Forum

12 March 2020	Real Madrid (Spain)	vs.	(Serbia) Crvena zvezda mts	Madrid
21:00
		Boxscore		Arena: WiZink Center

13 March 2020	Khimki (Russia)	vs.	(Germany) Bayern Munich	Mytishchi
18:00
		Boxscore		Arena: Mytishchi Arena

13 March 2020	Fenerbahçe Beko (Turkey)	vs.	(Greece) Panathinaikos OPAP	Istanbul
18:45
		Boxscore		Arena: Ülker Sports and Event Hall

13 March 2020	LDLC ASVEL (France)	vs.	(Russia) Zenit Saint Petersburg	Villeurbanne
20:45
		Boxscore		Arena: Astroballe

13 March 2020	Barcelona (Spain)	vs.	(Lithuania) Žalgiris	Barcelona
21:00
		Boxscore		Arena: Palau Blaugrana

=== Round 30 ===
19 March 2020	CSKA Moscow (Russia)	vs.	(France) LDLC ASVEL	Moscow
18:00
		Boxscore		Arena: Megasport Arena

19 March 2020	ALBA Berlin (Germany)	vs.	(Greece) Panathinaikos OPAP	Berlin
20:00
		Boxscore		Arena: Mercedes-Benz Arena

19 March 2020	Maccabi Tel Aviv (Israel)	vs.	(Russia) Zenit Saint Petersburg	Tel Aviv
20:05
		Boxscore		Arena: Menora Mivtachim Arena

19 March 2020	Barcelona (Spain)	vs.	(Russia) Khimki	Barcelona
21:00
		Boxscore		Arena: Palau Blaugrana

20 March 2020	Anadolu Efes (Turkey)	vs.	(Spain) Kirolbet Baskonia	Istanbul
18:30
		Boxscore		Arena: Sinan Erdem Dome

20 March 2020	Crvena zvezda mts (Serbia)	vs.	(Italy) A|X Armani Exchange Milan	Belgrade
19:00
		Boxscore		Arena: Štark Arena

20 March 2020	Bayern Munich (Germany)	vs.	(Turkey) Fenerbahçe Beko	Munich
20:30
		Boxscore		Arena: Audi Dome

20 March 2020	Olympiacos (Greece)	vs.	(Spain) Real Madrid	Piraeus
20:30
		Boxscore		Arena: Peace and Friendship Stadium

20 March 2020	Valencia Basket (Spain)	vs.	(Lithuania) Žalgiris	Valencia
21:00
		Boxscore		Arena: La Fonteta

=== Round 31 ===
24 March 2020	CSKA Moscow (Russia)	vs.	(Israel) Maccabi Tel Aviv	Moscow
18:00
		Boxscore		Arena: Megasport Arena

24 March 2020	Žalgiris (Lithuania)	vs.	(Turkey) Fenerbahçe Beko	Kaunas
19:00
		Boxscore		Arena: Žalgirio Arena

24 March 2020	Olympiacos (Greece)	vs.	(Serbia) Crvena zvezda mts	Piraeus
20:00
		Boxscore		Arena: Peace and Friendship Stadium

24 March 2020	Bayern Munich (Germany)	vs.	(Germany) ALBA Berlin	Munich
20:30
		Boxscore		Arena: Audi Dome

24 March 2020	Valencia Basket (Spain)	vs.	(Spain) Real Madrid	Valencia
21:00
		Boxscore		Arena: La Fonteta

25 March 2020	Zenit Saint Petersburg (Russia)	vs.	(Turkey) Anadolu Efes	Saint Petersburg
18:00
		Boxscore		Arena: Sibur Arena

25 March 2020	Panathinaikos OPAP (Greece)	vs.	(Russia) Khimki	Athens
20:00
		Boxscore		Arena: O.A.K.A.

25 March 2020	LDLC ASVEL (France)	vs.	(Spain) Barcelona	Villeurbanne
20:45
		Boxscore		Arena: Astroballe

25 March 2020	Kirolbet Baskonia (Spain)	vs.	(Italy) A|X Armani Exchange Milan	Vitoria-Gasteiz
21:00
		Boxscore		Arena: Buesa Arena

=== Round 32 ===
26 March 2020	Fenerbahçe Beko (Turkey)	vs.	(Russia) CSKA Moscow	Istanbul
18:45
		Boxscore		Arena: Ülker Sports and Event Hall

26 March 2020	ALBA Berlin (Germany)	vs.	(Spain) Valencia Basket	Berlin
20:00
		Boxscore		Arena: Mercedes-Benz Arena

26 March 2020	Maccabi Tel Aviv (Israel)	vs.	(Lithuania) Žalgiris	Tel Aviv
20:05
		Boxscore		Arena: Menora Mivtachim Arena

26 March 2020	Real Madrid (Spain)	vs.	(Germany) Bayern Munich	Madrid
21:00
		Boxscore		Arena: WiZink Center

27 March 2020	Khimki (Russia)	vs.	(Greece) Olympiacos	Mytishchi
18:00
		Boxscore		Arena: Mytishchi Arena

27 March 2020	Anadolu Efes (Turkey)	vs.	(Greece) Panathinaikos OPAP	Istanbul
18:30
		Boxscore		Arena: Sinan Erdem Dome

27 March 2020	Crvena zvezda mts (Serbia)	vs.	(Russia) Zenit Saint Petersburg	Belgrade
19:00
		Boxscore		Arena: Štark Arena

27 March 2020	A|X Armani Exchange Milan (Italy)	vs.	(France) LDLC ASVEL	Assago
20:45
		Boxscore		Arena: Mediolanum Forum

27 March 2020	Barcelona (Spain)	vs.	(Spain) Kirolbet Baskonia	Barcelona
21:00
		Boxscore		Arena: Palau Blaugrana

=== Round 33 ===
2 April 2020	Zenit Saint Petersburg (Russia)	vs.	(Italy) A|X Armani Exchange Milan	Saint Petersburg
19:00
		Boxscore		Arena: Sibur Arena

2 April 2020	Fenerbahçe Beko (Turkey)	vs.	(Greece) Olympiacos	Istanbul
19:45
		Boxscore		Arena: Ülker Sports and Event Hall

2 April 2020	ALBA Berlin (Germany)	vs.	(France) LDLC ASVEL	Berlin
20:00
		Boxscore		Arena: Mercedes-Benz Arena

2 April 2020	Barcelona (Spain)	vs.	(Spain) Real Madrid	Barcelona
21:00
		Boxscore		Arena: Palau Blaugrana

3 April 2020	Khimki (Russia)	vs.	(Turkey) Anadolu Efes	Mytishchi
19:00
		Boxscore		Arena: Mytishchi Arena

3 April 2020	Žalgiris (Lithuania)	vs.	(Russia) CSKA Moscow	Kaunas
19:00
		Boxscore		Arena: Žalgirio Arena

3 April 2020	Panathinaikos OPAP (Greece)	vs.	(Israel) Maccabi Tel Aviv	Athens
20:00
		Boxscore		Arena: O.A.K.A.

3 April 2020	Bayern Munich (Germany)	vs.	(Serbia) Crvena zvezda mts	Munich
20:30
		Boxscore		Arena: Audi Dome

3 April 2020	Kirolbet Baskonia (Spain)	vs.	(Spain) Valencia Basket	Vitoria-Gasteiz
21:00
		Boxscore		Arena: Buesa Arena

=== Round 34 ===
9 April 2020	Olympiacos (Greece)	vs.	(Spain) Barcelona	Piraeus
20:00
		Boxscore		Arena: Peace and Friendship Stadium

9 April 2020	LDLC ASVEL (France)	vs.	(Israel) Maccabi Tel Aviv	Villeurbanne
20:45
		Boxscore		Arena: Astroballe

9 April 2020	A|X Armani Exchange Milan (Italy)	vs.	(Russia) CSKA Moscow	Assago
20:45
		Boxscore		Arena: Mediolanum Forum

9 April 2020	Valencia Basket (Spain)	vs.	(Serbia) Crvena zvezda mts	Valencia
21:00
		Boxscore		Arena: La Fonteta

10 April 2020	Žalgiris (Lithuania)	vs.	(Germany) Bayern Munich	Kaunas
19:00
		Boxscore		Arena: Žalgirio Arena

10 April 2020	Anadolu Efes (Turkey)	vs.	(Turkey) Fenerbahçe Beko	Istanbul
19:30
		Boxscore		Arena: Sinan Erdem Dome

10 April 2020	ALBA Berlin (Germany)	vs.	(Russia) Khimki	Berlin
20:00
		Boxscore		Arena: Mercedes-Benz Arena

10 April 2020	Kirolbet Baskonia (Spain)	vs.	(Greece) Panathinaikos OPAP	Vitoria-Gasteiz
21:00
		Boxscore		Arena: Buesa Arena

10 April 2020	Real Madrid (Spain)	vs.	(Russia) Zenit Saint Petersburg	Madrid
21:00
		Boxscore		Arena: WiZink Center
