= 2016–17 Greek Basket League =

Greek Basket League
- Season: 2016–17
- Duration: 8 October 2016 – 11 June 2017
- Games played: 206
- Teams: 14
- TV partners: OTE Sport; Nova Sports

Regular season
- Season MVP: (Greece) Nick Calathes
- Relegated: Apollon Patras Carna; Doxa Lefkadas

Finals
- Champions: Panathinaikos Superfoods (35th title)
- Runners-up: Olympiacos
- Third place: AEK
- Fourth place: Aris
- Finals MVP: (United States) Mike James

Statistical leaders
Points	(United States) Will Cummings	367
Rebounds	(United States) Keith Clanton	240
Assists	(Greece) Nick Calathes	145
Index Rating	(United States) Chris Singleton	421

Records
- Biggest home win: Aris 98–50 Rethymno (28 January 2017); Olympiacos 93–45 Kymis (13 April 2017)
- Biggest away win: AEK 67–105 Panathinaikos (22 May 2017)
- Highest scoring: Rethymno 104–97 Promitheas (3 December 2016)
- Winning streak: 25 games Panathinaikos Superfoods
- Losing streak: 8 games Doxa Lefkadas

The 2016–17 Basket League season was the 25th season of the top-tier Greek professional basketball league, since its establishment in 1992, and the 77th season of top-flight Greek basketball overall. The season started on 8 October 2016, and ended on 11 June 2017. Panathinaikos Superfoods won its 35th title in club history, after beating Olympiacos 3–2 in the Finals.

== Teams ==
=== Promotion and relegation ===
- Nea Kifissia, Arkadikos, and Kavala were relegated after the 2015–16 Greek Basket League.
- Kymis Seajets, Promitheas Patras, and Doxa Lefkadas were promoted from the 2015–16 Greek A2 Basket League.
2016–17 Greek Basket League season club locations.

=== Locations and arenas ===
Club	Ap.	City	Arena	Capacity
AEK	60	Marousi, Athens	OAKA Indoor Hall	19,250
Apollon Patras Carna	32	Patras	Apollon Patras Indoor Hall	3,500
Aris	63	Thessaloniki	Alexandrio Melathron	5,138
Doxa Lefkadas	1	Lefkada City	Lefkada Indoor Hall	1,200
Kolossos H Hotels	11	Rhodes City	Venetoklio Indoor Hall	1,242
Koroivos	3	Amaliada	Amaliada Indoor Hall	2,000
Kymis Seajets	1	Kymi	Tasos Kampouris Kanithou Indoor Hall (Chalcis)	1,620
Lavrio DHI	2	Lavrio	Lavrio Indoor Hall	1,700
Olympiacos	64	Piraeus, Athens	Peace and Friendship Stadium	12,000
Panathinaikos Superfoods	67	Marousi, Athens	OAKA Indoor Hall	19,250
PAOK	60	Pylaia, Thessaloniki	PAOK Sports Arena	8,500
Promitheas Patras	1	Patras	Dimitris Tofalos Arena	4,200
Rethymno Cretan Kings	7	Rethymno	Rethymno Indoor Hall	1,600
Trikala Aries	4	Trikala	Trikala Indoor Hall	2,500

=== Personnel and kits ===
Team	Head coach	Team captain	Kit manufacturer	Shirt sponsor
AEK	(Greece) Sotiris Manolopoulos	(Greece) Dušan Šakota	Fila	OPAP
Apollon Patras Carna	(Greece) Kostas Mexas	(Greece) Dimitrios Verginis	ASICS / Macron	Loux
Aris	(Greece) Dimitris Priftis	(Greece) Spyros Mourtos	NG6	
Doxa Lefkadas	(Greece) Charis Markopoulos	(Greece) Dimitris Tsaldaris	Spalding	Cava Katopodis
Kolossos H Hotels	(Greece) Aris Lykogiannis	(Greece) Ioannis Georgalis	Fila	Aegean Airlines
Koroivos	(Greece) Dinos Kalampakos	(Greece) Antonis Michaloglou	Nickan	Loux
Kymis Seajets	(Greece) Vassilis Bratsiakos	(Greece) Stavros Toutziarakis	Erreà	Seajets
Lavrio DHI	(Greece) Christos Serelis	(Greece) Sakis Giannakopoulos	Nickan	Naprosyn
Olympiacos	(Greece) Ioannis Sfairopoulos	(Greece) Vassilis Spanoulis	Nike	OPAP
Panathinaikos Superfoods	(Spain) Xavi Pascual	(Greece) Nick Calathes	Adidas	OPAP
PAOK	(Greece) Soulis Markopoulos	(Greece) Vangelis Margaritis	Athlos	OPAP
Promitheas Patras	(Greece) Vangelis Angelou	(Greece) Vassilis Giannikopoulos	Spalding	Loux
Rethymno Cretan Kings	(Greece) Nikos Vetoulas	(Greece) Charis Giannopoulos	Nickan	OPAP
Trikala Aries	(Greece) Ioannis Kastritis	(Greece) Sotirios Manolopoulos	CAP	Olympos

=== European competitions ===
Team	Competition	Result
Olympiacos	EuroLeague	Runners-up
Panathinaikos Superfoods	EuroLeague	Playoffs
AEK	Champions League	Round of 16
Aris	Champions League	Round of 16
PAOK	Champions League	Round of 16

== Regular season ==
=== League table ===
Pos	Team	Pld	W	L	PF	PA	PD	Pts	Qualification or relegation
1	Olympiacos	26	25	1	2096	1650	+446	51	Qualification to semifinals
2	Panathinaikos Superfoods	26	25	1	2206	1706	+500	51	Qualification to semifinals
3	AEK	26	19	7	2055	1834	+221	45	Qualification to quarterfinals
4	Aris	26	15	11	1972	1863	+109	41	Qualification to quarterfinals
5	PAOK	26	14	12	1972	2009	−37	40	Qualification to first round
6	Rethymno Cretan Kings	26	13	13	1953	2008	−55	39	Qualification to first round
7	Kolossos H Hotels	26	13	13	1866	1887	−21	39	Qualification to first round
8	Lavrio DHI	26	11	15	1894	1956	−62	37	Qualification to first round
9	Promitheas Patras	26	10	16	1857	1930	−73	36	
10	Trikala Aries	26	10	16	1817	1959	−142	36	
11	Koroivos	26	8	18	1881	2154	−273	34	
12	Kymis Seajets	26	8	18	1821	2022	−201	34	
13	Apollon Patras Carna (R)	26	7	19	1799	1959	−160	33	Relegation to Greek A2 League
14	Doxa Lefkadas (R)	26	4	22	1780	2032	−252	30	Relegation to Greek A2 League

Source: ESAKE
(R) Relegated

=== Results ===
Home \ Away	AEK	APO	ARIS	DOX	KOL	KOR	KYM	LAV	OLY	PAO	PAOK	PRO	RET	TRI
AEK	—	88–69	81–61	84–60	82–81	89–75	71–65	96–56	63–70	87–106	77–71	76–60	80–62	87–82
Apollon Patras Carna	59–77	—	64–79	74–65	83–67	92–66	75–60	72–61	70–87	74–97	88–79	53–67	86–78	68–73
Aris	81–77	79–70	—	78–70	84–60	100–79	85–72	98–77	63–70	59–71	62–66	80–64	98–50	75–65
Doxa Lefkadas	64–68	75–70	69–79	—	61–62	65–69	84–81	63–64	94–95	46–73	84–78	73–79	67–80	72–80
Kolossos H Hotels	86–73	71–59	85–84	77–60	—	90–88	64–54	63–79	59–70	73–82	73–68	76–59	66–74	73–53
Koroivos	63–89	71–67	94–99	74–71	66–86	—	94–64	89–86	66–88	55–76	80–82	66–62	67–78	87–76
Kymis Seajets	55–81	76–70	77–80	97–65	74–64	93–70	—	81–86	72–90	54–77	93–82	77–66	73–62	78–67
Lavrio DHI	84–87	79–65	75–70	80–60	65–67	93–63	75–69	—	64–80	60–84	63–73	74–77	73–62	86–56
Olympiacos	78–67	83–55	69–55	84–60	75–67	85–62	93–48	84–52	—	88–63	84–59	90–63	83–58	79–61
Panathinaikos Superfoods	77–68	96–59	70–54	90–61	80–65	96–65	92–52	85–64	72–59	—	102–58	81–71	116–83	93–63
PAOK	71–78	84–83	62–58	84–67	85–73	75–66	88–71	85–80	84–89	68–72	—	78–75	77–75	97–86
Promitheas Patras	67–86	65–58	79–89	78–70	78–68	79–81	81–57	64–61	53–72	69–72	73–75	—	80–84	84–67
Rethymno Cretan Kings	72–65	71–56	69–60	80–86	77–83	101–70	84–73	88–79	63–70	74–101	73–70	104–97	—	84–56
Trikala Aries	59–78	65–60	78–62	74–68	74–67	72–55	76–58	75–78	60–81	77–82	84–73	62–67	76–67	—

Legend: Blue = home team win; Red = away team win.

=== Positions by round ===
The table lists the positions of teams after completion of each round.

Team ╲ Round	1	2	3	4	5	6	7	8	9	10	11	12	13	14	15	16	17	18	19	20	21	22	23	24	25	26
Olympiacos	1	2	2	2	2	2	2	1	1	1	1	1	1	1	1	1	1	1	1	1	1	1	1	1	1	1
Panathinaikos Superfoods	4	7	3	3	3	3	3	2	2	2	2	2	2	2	2	2	2	2	2	2	2	2	2	2	2	2
AEK	2	1	1	1	1	1	1	3	3	3	3	3	3	3	3	3	3	3	3	3	3	3	3	3	3	3
Aris	3	6	10	6	7	6	7	7	6	5	4	4	4	5	4	5	4	5	4	5	4	6	5	4	5	4
PAOK	8	10	4	5	4	5	5	4	4	4	5	5	5	4	6	4	5	4	5	4	5	4	4	5	4	5
Rethymno Cretan Kings	5	3	5	4	5	4	4	5	5	6	6	7	7	7	7	7	8	7	7	7	7	7	7	6	6	6
Kolossos H Hotels	10	12	9	11	6	11	6	6	7	7	7	6	6	6	5	6	6	6	6	6	6	5	6	7	7	7
Lavrio DHI	6	8	6	7	9	8	11	12	12	12	12	12	11	8	11	8	7	8	10	11	9	9	9	9	8	8
Promitheas Patras	11	4	7	8	8	7	8	8	8	8	9	9	10	12	12	9	10	9	9	8	8	8	8	8	9	9
Trikala Aries	12	11	8	13	12	12	10	11	14	14	14	13	12	10	8	10	11	10	8	9	10	10	10	10	10	10
Koroivos	14	14	14	9	11	14	14	10	11	10	10	11	9	13	9	11	9	11	11	10	11	11	11	11	12	11
Kymis Seajets	9	9	13	12	10	10	9	9	9	9	8	8	8	9	10	12	13	13	12	12	12	12	12	12	11	12
Apollon Patras Carna	13	13	12	14	13	13	12	13	10	11	11	10	13	11	13	13	12	12	13	13	13	13	13	13	13	13
Doxa Lefkadas	7	5	11	10	14	9	13	14	13	13	13	14	14	14	14	14	14	14	14	14	14	14	14	14	14	14

Leader of the Regular season
Qualification to Playoffs
Relegation to A2

Updated to match(es) played on 13 April 2017. Source: ESAKE

== Playoffs ==
=== Bracket ===
Teams in bold won the playoff series. Numbers to the left of each team indicate the team's original playoff seeding. Numbers to the right indicate the score of each playoff game.

First round 19–26 April
5 **PAOK**	**2**
8 Lavrio DHI	0
6 **Rethymno Cretan Kings**	**2**
7 Kolossos H Hotels	1

Quarterfinals; 29 April–4 May
4 **Aris**	**2**
5 PAOK	0
3 **AEK**	**2**
6 Rethymno Cretan Kings	0

Semifinals; 10-22 May
1 **Olympiacos**	**3**
4 Aris	0
2 **Panathinaikos Superfoods**	**3**
3 AEK	1

Finals; 28 May–11 June
1 Olympiacos	2
2 **Panathinaikos Superfoods**	**3**
Third Place
3 **AEK**	**3**
4 Aris	0

=== First round ===
In the first round, the teams that finished in places 5 to 8 of the regular season standings, playing against each other have to win two games to win the series. Thus, if one team wins two games before all three games have been played, the remaining game is omitted. The team that finished in the higher regular season place, plays the first and the third (if necessary) game of the series at home.

Team 1	Agg.	Team 2	Game 1	Game 2	Game 3
**PAOK**	2–0	Lavrio DHI	82–65	78–68	—
**Rethymno Cretan Kings**	2–1	Kolossos H Hotels	84–71	73–78	69–55

=== Quarterfinals ===
In the quarterfinals, teams playing against each other have to win two games to win the series. Thus, if one team wins two games before all three games have been played, the remaining game is omitted. The team that finished in the higher regular season place, is going to play the first and the third (if necessary) game of the series at home.

Team 1	Agg.	Team 2	Game 1	Game 2	Game 3
**Aris**	2–0	PAOK	69–65	75–84	—
**AEK**	2–0	Rethymno Cretan Kings	90–78	81–70	—

=== Semifinals ===
In the semifinals, teams playing against each other have to win three games to win the series. Thus, if one team wins three games before all five games have been played, the remaining games are omitted. The team that finished in the higher regular season place, is going to play the first, the third and the fifth (if necessary) game of the series at home.

Team 1	Agg.	Team 2	Game 1	Game 2	Game 3	Game 4	Game 5
**Olympiacos**	3–0	Aris	84–54	84–77	79–65	—	—
**Panathinaikos Superfoods**	3–1	AEK	80–70	70–71	81–72	105–67	—

=== Third place ===
In the series for the third place, teams playing against each other have to win three games to win the series. Thus, if one team wins three games before all five games have been played, the remaining games are omitted. The team that finished in the higher regular season place, is going to play the first, the third and the fifth (if necessary) game of the series at home.

Team 1	Agg.	Team 2	Game 1	Game 2	Game 3	Game 4	Game 5
**AEK**	3–0	Aris	90–74	91–85	71–60	—	—

=== Finals ===
In the finals, teams playing against each other have to win three games to win the series. Thus, if one team wins three games before all five games have been played, the remaining games are omitted. The team that finished in the higher regular season place, is going to play the first, the third and the fifth (if necessary) game of the series at home.

Team 1	Agg.	Team 2	Game 1	Game 2	Game 3	Game 4	Game 5
Olympiacos	2–3	**Panathinaikos Superfoods**	63–58	80–84	64–62	58–71	51–66

== Final standings ==
Pos	Team	Pld	W	L	Qualification or Relegation
1	Panathinaikos	35	31	4	Qualification to the EuroLeague; *Club qualified for EuroLeague by having a contract
2	Olympiacos	34	30	4	Qualification to the EuroLeague; *Club qualified for EuroLeague by having a contract
3	AEK	35	25	10	Qualification to the Champions League regular season *AEK declined EuroCup participation.
4	Aris	34	17	17	Qualification to the Champions League regular season *AEK declined EuroCup participation.
5	PAOK	30	16	14	Qualification to the Champions League regular season *AEK declined EuroCup participation.
6	Rethymno Cretan Kings	31	15	16	
7	Kolossos Rodou	29	14	15	
8	Lavrio	28	11	17	
9	Promitheas Patras	26	10	16	
10	Trikala Aries	26	10	16	
11	Koroivos	26	8	18	
12	Kymis Seajets	26	8	18	
13	Apollon Patras	26	7	19	Relegation to the Greek A2 League
14	Doxa Lefkadas	26	4	22	Relegation to the Greek A2 League

== Awards ==
All official awards of the 2016–17 Greek Basket League.

=== Greek League MVP ===
Player	Team
(Greece) Nick Calathes	Panathinaikos

=== Greek League Finals MVP ===
Player	Team
(United States) Mike James	Panathinaikos

=== All-Greek League Team ===
Pos.	Player	Team
G	(Greece) Nick Calathes	Panathinaikos
G	(Greece) Vassilis Spanoulis	Olympiacos
F	(Greece) Kostas Papanikolaou	Olympiacos
F	(Greece) Giorgos Printezis	Olympiacos
C	(United States) Chris Singleton	Panathinaikos

=== Best Coach ===
Player	Team
(Spain) Xavi Pascual	Panathinaikos

=== Defensive Player of the Year ===
Player	Team
(Greece) Nick Calathes	Panathinaikos

=== Best Young Player ===
Player	Team
(Greece) Antonis Koniaris	PAOK

=== Most Improved Player ===
Player	Team
(Serbia) Nikola Milutinov	Olympiacos

=== Most Popular Player ===
Player	Team
(Greece) Vassilis Spanoulis	Olympiacos

=== Most Spectacular Player ===
Player	Team
(United States) Mike James	Panathinaikos

== Statistical leaders ==
The Greek Basket League counts official stats leaders by stats totals, and not by per game averages. It also counts the total stats for both regular season combined.

=== Performance index rating ===
Pos	Player	Club	PIR
1	(United States) Chris Singleton	Panathinaikos	421
2	(Greece) Ioannis Bourousis	Panathinaikos	399
3	(United States) Keith Clanton	PAOK	393
4	(United States) Will Cummings	Aris	374
5	(United States) Toarlyn Fitzpatrick	Rethymno	368

=== Points ===
Pos	Player	Club	Total Points
1	(United States) Will Cummings	Aris	367
2	(United States) Kelsey Barlow	Trikala	363
3	(United States) Toddrick Gotcher	Koroivos	335
4	(United States) Toarlyn Fitzpatrick	Rethymno	328
5	(United States) Robert Arnold	Rethymno	322

=== Rebounds ===
Pos	Player	Club	Total Rebounds
1	(United States) Keith Clanton	PAOK	240
2	(United States) Toarlyn Fitzpatrick	Rethymno	173
3	(United States) Chris Singleton	Panathinaikos	158
4	(Greece) Panagiotis Vasilopoulos	Kolossos Rodou	153
5	(United States) Toddrick Gotcher	Koroivos	150

=== Assists ===
Pos	Player	Club	Total Assists
1	(Greece) Nick Calathes	Panathinaikos	145
2	(United States) Shannon Scott	Doxa Lefkadas	106
3	(United States) Gary Talton	Rethymno	105
4	(United States) Langston Hall	Kolossos Rodou	99
5	(Greece) Vassilis Spanoulis	Olympiacos	98

== Clubs in international competitions ==
Team	Competition	Result
Olympiacos	EuroLeague	Final Four, 2nd place
Panathinaikos	EuroLeague	Playoffs, Quarterfinals
AEK	Champions League	Playoffs, Round of 16
Aris	Champions League	Playoffs, Round of 16
PAOK	Champions League	Playoffs, Round of 16

== See also ==
- 2016–17 Greek Basketball Cup
- 2016–17 Greek A2 Basket League (2nd tier)
