= Alexander Gomelsky EuroLeague Coach of the Year =

Basketball league award

Georgios Bartzokas is a 3 time EuroLeague Head Coach of the Year (2013, 2022, and 2023).

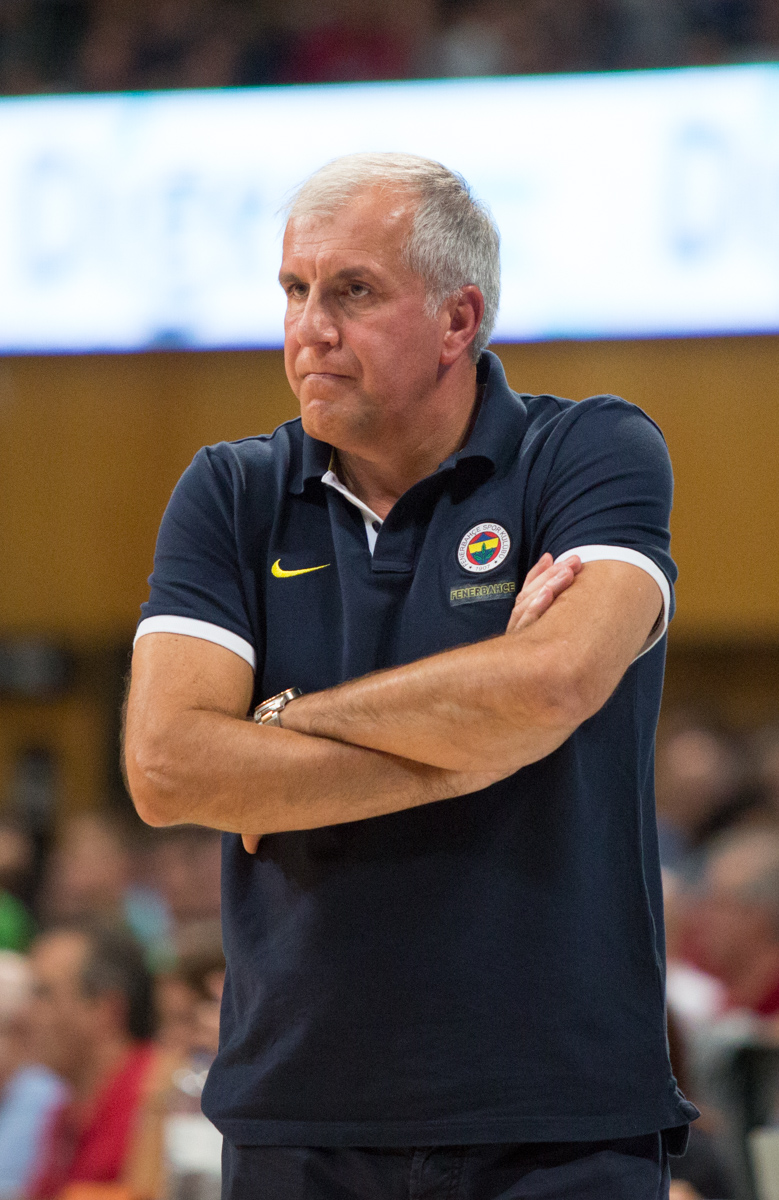
Željko Obradović is a 3 time EuroLeague Head Coach of the Year (2007, 2011, and 2017).

The Alexander Gomelsky EuroLeague Coach of the Year is an annual award of Europe's premier level basketball league, the EuroLeague, that is given to each season's best head coach. The award was first introduced in the 2004–05 season. The winner of the award receives the Alexander Gomelsky Trophy, named after the Russian head basketball coach, who among other achievements, led Rīgas ASK to three consecutive EuroLeague titles, between 1958 and 1960, before adding one more with CSKA Moscow in 1971.

Pini Gershon was the first recipient of the award, after winning the 2005 EuroLeague title with Maccabi Tel Aviv. Georgios Bartzokas and Željko Obradović have won the award three times.

== Winners ==
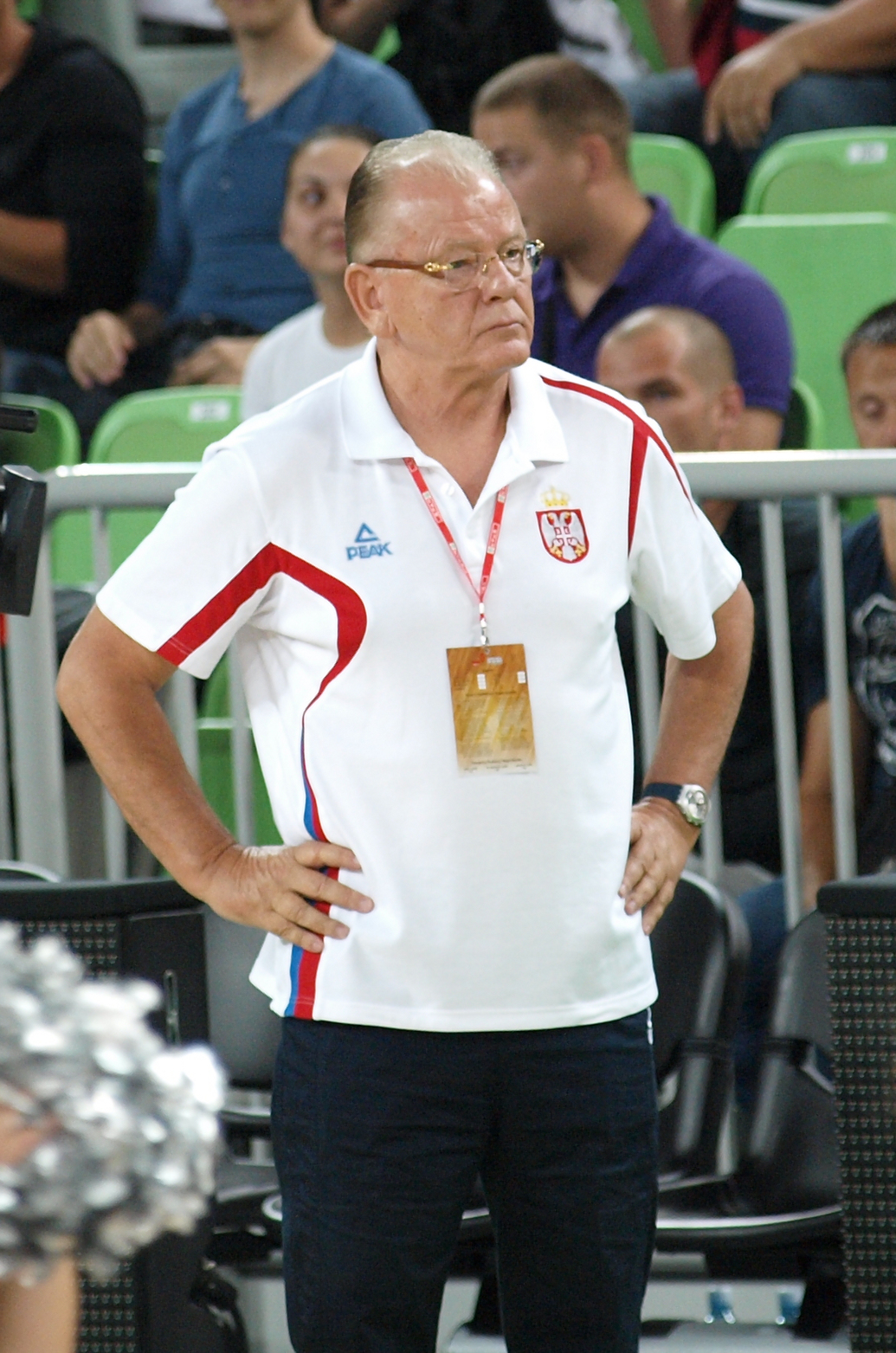
Dušan Ivković was the EuroLeague Head Coach of the Year in 2012.

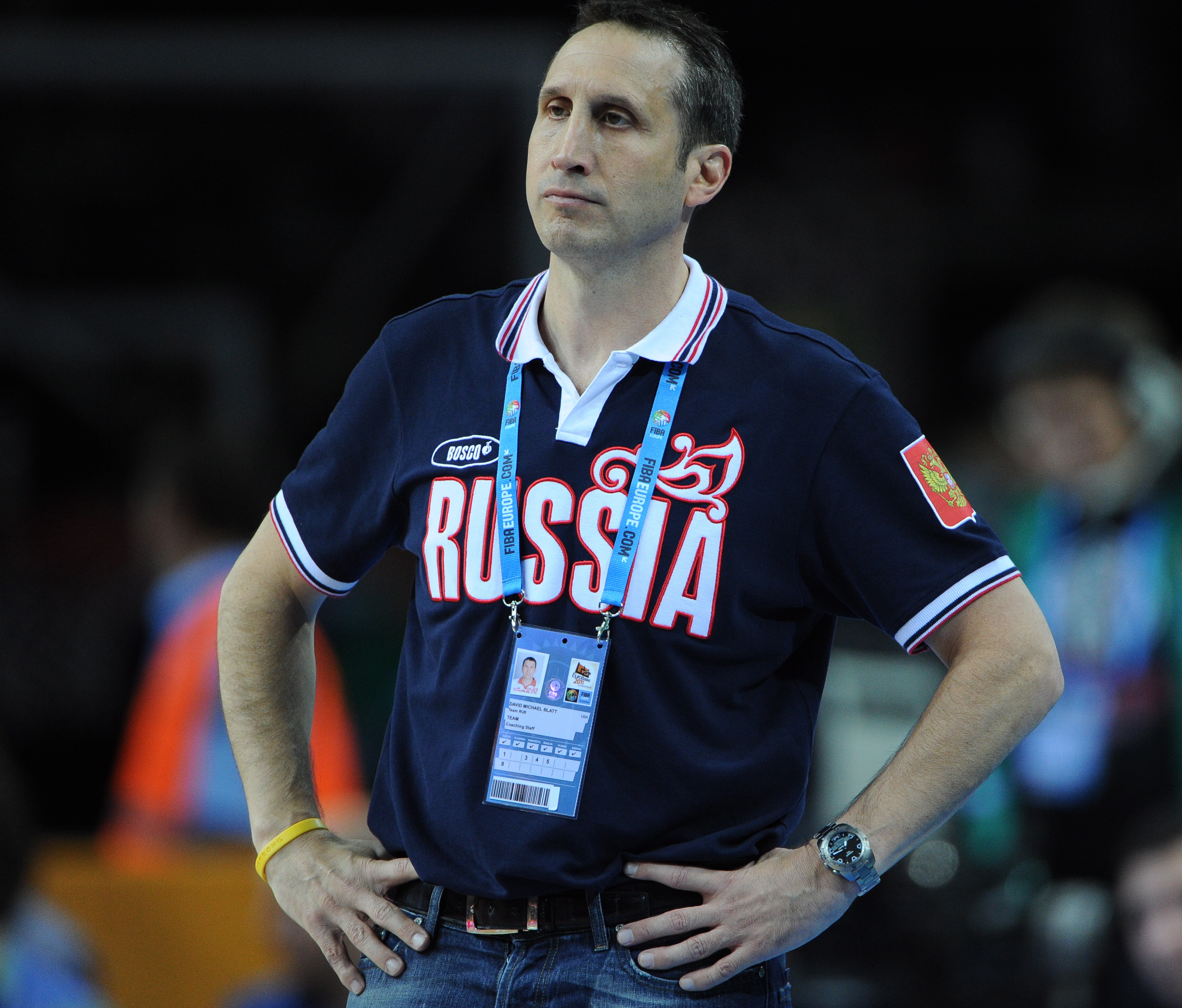
David Blatt was the EuroLeague Head Coach of the Year in 2014.

Season	Head coach	Team	Ref
2004–05	(Israel) Pini Gershon	(Israel) Maccabi Elite Tel Aviv	
2005–06	(Italy) Ettore Messina	(Russia) CSKA Moscow	
2006–07	(Serbia) Željko Obradović	(Greece) Panathinaikos	
2007–08	(Italy) Ettore Messina (2×)	(Russia) CSKA Moscow	
2008–09	(Serbia) Duško Vujošević	(Serbia) Partizan	
2009–10	(Spain) Xavi Pascual	(Spain) Regal FC Barcelona	
2010–11	(Serbia) Željko Obradović (2×)	(Greece) Panathinaikos	
2011–12	(Serbia) Dušan Ivković	(Greece) Olympiacos	
2012–13	(Greece) Georgios Bartzokas	(Greece) Olympiacos	
2013–14	(United States) (Israel) David Blatt	(Israel) Maccabi Electra Tel Aviv	
2014–15	(Spain) Pablo Laso	(Spain) Real Madrid	
2015–16	(Greece) Dimitrios Itoudis	(Russia) CSKA Moscow	
2016–17	(Serbia) Željko Obradović (3×)	(Turkey) Fenerbahçe	
2017–18	(Spain) Pablo Laso (2×)	(Spain) Real Madrid	
2018–19	(Greece) Dimitrios Itoudis (2×)	(Russia) CSKA Moscow	
2019–20	Not awarded ^{1}		
2020–21	(Turkey) Ergin Ataman	(Turkey) Anadolu Efes	
2021–22	(Greece) Georgios Bartzokas (2×)	(Greece) Olympiacos	
2022–23	(Greece) Georgios Bartzokas (3×)	(Greece) Olympiacos	
2023–24	(Spain) Chus Mateo	(Spain) Real Madrid	
2024–25	(Lithuania) Šarūnas Jasikevičius	(Turkey) Fenerbahçe	
2025–26	(Spain) Pedro Martínez	(Spain) Valencia Basket	

Notes:

^1 There was no awarding in the 2019–20, because the season was cancelled due to the coronavirus pandemic in Europe.

== Multiple honours ==
=== Head coaches ===
Number	Head coach
3	(Greece) Georgios Bartzokas
3	(Serbia) Željko Obradović
2	(Italy) Ettore Messina
2	(Spain) Pablo Laso
2	(Greece) Dimitrios Itoudis
1	(Israel) David Blatt
1	(Israel) Pini Gershon
1	(Serbia) Duško Vujošević
1	(Serbia) Dušan Ivković
1	(Spain) Xavi Pascual
1	(Turkey) Ergin Ataman
1	(Spain) Chus Mateo
1	(Lithuania) Šarūnas Jasikevičius
1	(Spain) Pedro Martínez

=== Head coach nationality ===
Number	Country
5	Greece
5	Serbia
5	Spain
2	Italy
2	Israel
1	Turkey
1	Lithuania

=== Teams ===
Number	Team
4	(Greece) Olympiacos
4	(Russia) CSKA Moscow
3	(Spain) Real Madrid
2	(Greece) Panathinaikos
2	(Israel) Maccabi Tel Aviv
2	(Turkey) Fenerbahçe
1	(Spain) FC Barcelona
1	(Serbia) Partizan
1	(Turkey) Anadolu Efes
1	(Spain) Valencia Basket

== See also ==
- List of EuroLeague-winning head coaches
