= Georgios Vovoras =

Greek professional basketball coach (born 1977)

Georgios Vovoras Γιώργος Βόβορας
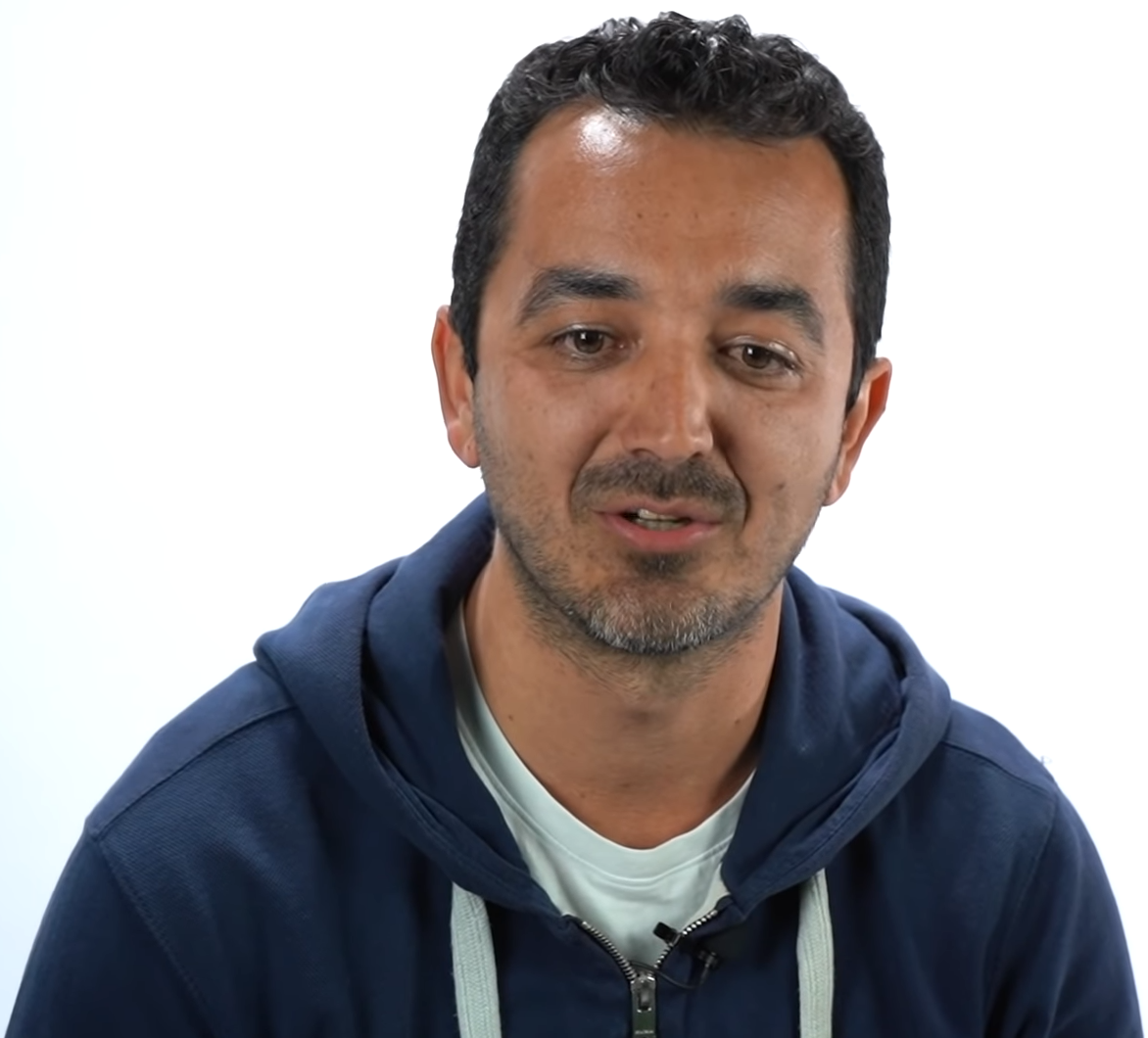
- Georgios Vovoras, in March 2021.

Promitheas Patras
- Position: Head coach
- League: GBL; BCL

Personal information
- Born: 18 January 1977 (age 49) Athens, Greece
- Coaching career: 2000–present

Career history

Coaching
- 2000–2002: Chalkida (assistant)
- 2002–2003: Alimos (assistant)
- 2003–2005: Milon (assistant)
- 2005–2007: Doukas (assistant)
- 2007–2008: Rethymno (assistant)
- 2008: PAOK Thessaloniki (assistant)
- 2008–2009: OFI Crete
- 2010: Trikala 2000 (assistant)
- 2010–2012: Peristeri (assistant)
- 2012–2014: Panathinaikos (assistant)
- 2014–2015: UNICS Kazan (assistant)
- 2015–2016: APOEL Nicosia
- 2016–2020: Panathinaikos (assistant)
- 2020–2021: Panathinaikos
- 2021–2022: Debreceni
- 2022: Panathinaikos
- 2022–2023: Panathinaikos (assistant)
- 2024–2025: Neptūnas Klaipėda
- 2025–2026: Bahrain
- 2026–present: Promitheas Patras

Career highlights
- As head coach: Cypriot Basketball Cup winner (2016); As assistant coach: 6× Greek Basket League champion (2013, 2014, 2017, 2018, 2019, 2020); 4× Greek Basketball Cup winner (2013, 2014, 2017, 2019)

Georgios Vovoras (alternate spellings: Giorgos, George, Yiorgos, Yorgos) (Greek: Γιώργος Βόβορας; born 18 January 1977) is a Greek professional basketball coach for the Promitheas Patras of the Greek Basket League (GBL) and the Basketball Champions League (BCL).

== Coaching career ==
Vovoras was the head coach of the Greek club OFI Irakleio, in the 3rd-tier level Greek B League, from 2008 to 2009. He was an assistant coach with the Greek club Peristeri, from 2010 to 2011. He then became an assistant coach with the Greek Basket League club Panathinaikos, from 2012 to 2014.

He then worked as an assistant coach with the Russian VTB United League club UNICS Kazan, during the 2014–15 season. He was next the head coach of the Cypriot League club APOEL Nicosia, during the 2015–16 season. With APOEL Nicosia, he won the 2016 Cypriot Cup.

He then returned to Panathinaikos, as an assistant coach, in May 2016. Vovoras became the interim head coach of Panathinaikos in October 2016, after the club's head coach, Argyris Pedoulakis, resigned from his position. Vovoras served as Panathinaikos' interim head coach, until the club signed Xavi Pascual to be the team's new permanent head coach.

He was Panathinaikos' interim head coach again in 2018, after Pascual was replaced in that role by Rick Pitino. Vovoras worked as the club's interim head coach until Pitino was able to join the club.

On 17 June 2020, Vovoras was officially announced as Panathinaikos's new head coach for the upcoming season. On 4 January 2021, Vovoras and Panathinaikos amicably parted ways after a string of unfortunate results for the club, both domestically and in European competition. He was replaced by Israeli coach Oded Kattash.

Vovoras coached the Hungarian club Debreceni from November 2021 to February 2022, winning six of the eleven league games in which he led the team. On 14 April 2022, Vovoras returned to Panathinaikos and took over the head coaching position after the sacking of Dimitrios Priftis and several administrative members of the club, in order for the team to finish out the Greek Basket League season and playoffs. The following season he served as an assistant coach to Dejan Radonjić until the latter's firing on 21 February 2023.

On 23 February 2024, Vovoras was announced as head coach of the Lithuanian League club Neptūnas Klaipėda, signing until the end of the 2024–25 season. Under Vovoras, Neptūnas recovered from a 6–12 start to the season with an eight-game winning streak, including a 114–112 overtime win over Žalgiris Kaunas on 17 April. The team reached the 2023–24 LKL quarterfinals before being eliminated by Wolves Twinsbet, finishing sixth in the league. In the 2024–25 season, Neptūnas achieved a historic milestone by reaching their first-ever Lithuanian Cup final, where they finished as runners-up. The team came within a missed three-pointer of claiming the first title in club history, ultimately falling to Žalgiris with a score of 89–91. On 3 April 2025, Vovoras was dismissed following a series of poor results in the LKL.

Vovoras became the head coach of the Bahrain national team on 11 June 2025.
