= 2019–20 EuroLeague =

EuroLeague season

2019–20 Turkish Airlines EuroLeague^{1}
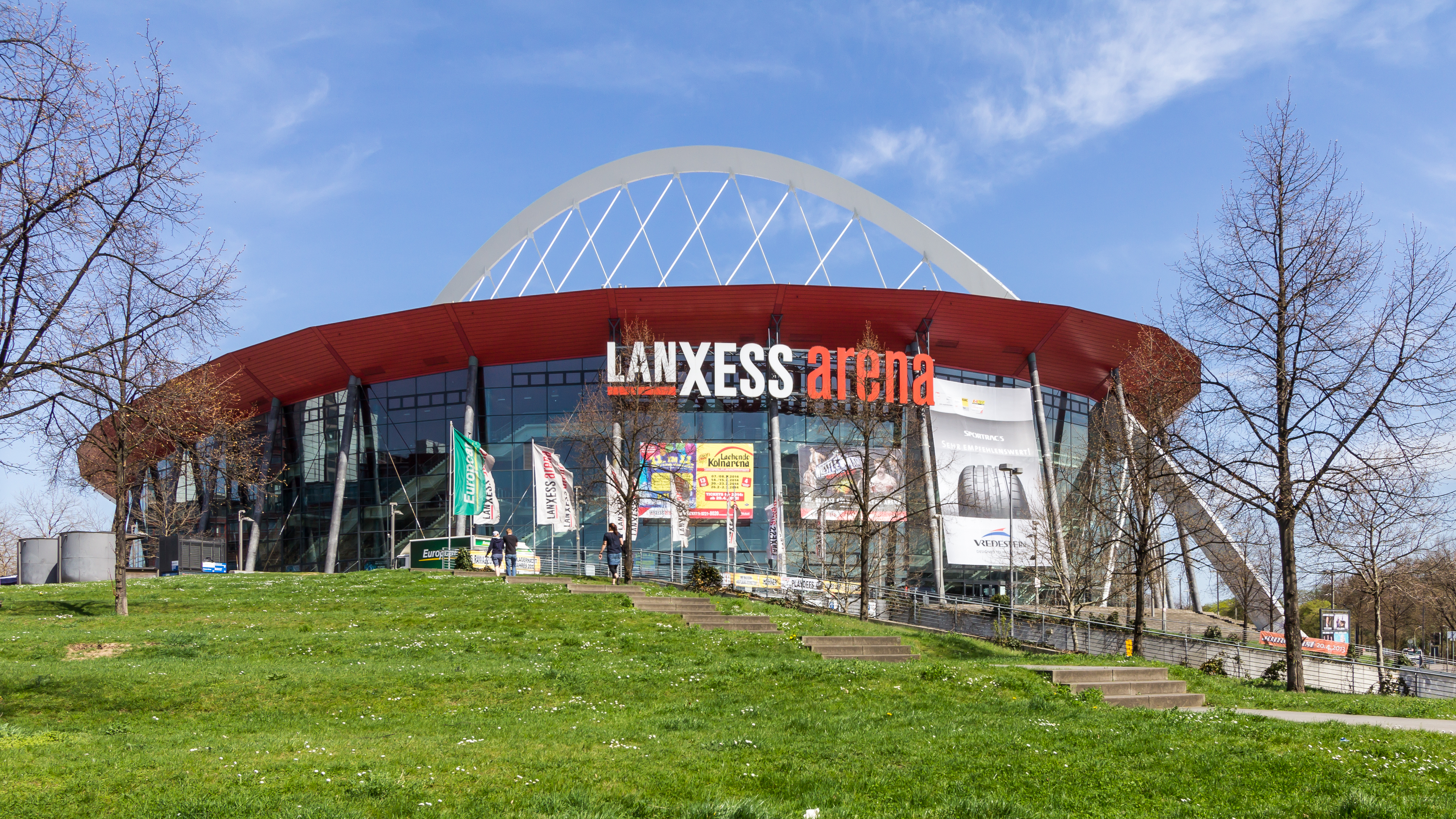
- The Lanxess Arena in Cologne would have hosted the Final Four
- Season: 2019–20
- Duration: 3 October 2019 – 11 March 2020
- Games played: 252
- Teams: 18

Records
- Biggest home win: Bayern Munich 104–63 ASVEL (17 October 2019)
- Biggest away win: Panathinaikos 66–97 CSKA Moscow (05 March 2020)
- Highest scoring: Anadolu Efes 106–105 ALBA Berlin (11 October 2019); Panathinaikos 105–106 ALBA Berlin (14 November 2019)
- Winning streak: 13 games Real Madrid
- Losing streak: 9 games Žalgiris
- Highest attendance: 17,396; Panathinaikos 99–93 Olympiacos (6 December 2019)
- Lowest attendance: 2,917; Khimki 75–84 Valencia Basket (14 January 2020)
- Attendance: 2,138,522 (8,520 per match)
- ^{1} Sponsored league name, referring to Turkish Airlines.

The 2019–20 Turkish Airlines EuroLeague was the 20th season of the modern era of the EuroLeague and the 10th under the title sponsorship of the Turkish Airlines. Including the competition's previous incarnation as the FIBA Europe Champions Cup, this was the 63rd season of the premier basketball competition for European men's clubs. The season started on 3 October 2019 and played its last games on 6 March 2020 due to the COVID-19 pandemic.

On 12 March 2020, Euroleague Basketball temporarily suspended its competitions due to the COVID-19 pandemic. On 25 May, Euroleague Basketball cancelled its competitions due to the COVID-19 pandemic.

The Final Four would have been played in 22–24 May 2020 at the Lanxess Arena in Cologne, Germany. CSKA Moscow was the defending champion and as a consequence of the COVID-19 pandemic, Euroleague Basketball decided not to recognize any team as the champion for the season. The Lanxess Arena was compensated by hosting the next Final Four.

== Format changes ==
On 5 July 2018, Euroleague Basketball agreed expand the competition to 18 teams, with the allocation of two-year wild cards to German Bayern Munich and French LDLC ASVEL.

== Team allocation ==
A total of 18 teams from 10 countries participated in the 2019–20 EuroLeague.

=== Distribution ===
The following was the access list for this season.

Access list for 2019–20 EuroLeague
	Teams entering in this round	Teams advancing from previous round
Regular season (18 teams)	11 licensed clubs with a long-term licence; 5 associated clubs with an annual licence; 4 league spots for Adriatic, Germany, VTB United League and Spain; EuroCup champion; 2 two-year wild cards	
Playoffs (8 teams)		8 highest-placed teams from the regular season
Final Four (4 teams)		4 series winners from the playoffs

=== Qualified teams ===
The labels in the parentheses show how each team qualified for the place of its starting round:

- 1st, 2nd, 3rd, etc.: League position after Playoffs
- EC: EuroCup champion
- WC: Wild card

Qualified teams for 2019–20 EuroLeague Licensed clubs
(Spain) Barcelona	(Greece) Olympiacos	(Turkey) Anadolu Efes	(Lithuania) Žalgiris
(Spain) Kirolbet Baskonia	(Greece) Panathinaikos OPAP	(Turkey) Fenerbahçe Beko	(Russia) CSKA Moscow^{TH}
(Spain) Real Madrid	(Israel) Maccabi FOX Tel Aviv	(Italy) AX Armani Exchange Milan	

Associated clubs
(Germany) ALBA Berlin (2nd)	(Russia) Khimki (2nd)	(Spain) Valencia Basket (EC)	(Serbia) Crvena zvezda mts (1st)
(Germany) Bayern Munich (WC)	(Russia) Zenit Saint Petersburg (WC)	(France) LDLC ASVEL (WC)	

Notes

1. ABA League (ABA): Crvena zvezda mts qualified through the ABA League.
2. VTB United League (VTB): Khimki qualified through the VTB United League.
3. Wild card (WC): As Valencia Basket won the EuroCup, the spot reserved for the best team in the 2018–19 ACB season was converted in a wild card.

== Teams ==
=== Venues and locations ===
Location of teams in 2019–20 EuroLeague

Team	Home city	Arena	Capacity
(Germany) ALBA Berlin	Berlin	Mercedes-Benz Arena	14,500
(Turkey) Anadolu Efes	Istanbul	Sinan Erdem Dome	16,000
(Italy) AX Armani Exchange Milan	Milan	Mediolanum Forum	12,700
(Italy) AX Armani Exchange Milan	Milan	Allianz Cloud	5,420
(Spain) Barcelona	Barcelona	Palau Blaugrana	7,585
(Germany) Bayern Munich	Munich	Audi Dome	6,500
(Serbia) Crvena zvezda mts	Belgrade	Štark Arena	18,386
(Serbia) Crvena zvezda mts	Belgrade	Aleksandar Nikolić Hall	8,000
(Russia) CSKA Moscow	Moscow	Megasport Arena	13,344
(Turkey) Fenerbahçe Beko	Istanbul	Ülker Sports and Event Hall	13,059
(Russia) Khimki	Khimki	Mytishchi Arena	7,280
(Spain) Kirolbet Baskonia	Vitoria-Gasteiz	Buesa Arena	15,504
(France) LDLC ASVEL	Villeurbanne	Astroballe	5,556
(Israel) Maccabi FOX Tel Aviv	Tel Aviv	Menora Mivtachim Arena	10,383
(Greece) Olympiacos	Piraeus	Peace and Friendship Stadium	11,640
(Greece) Panathinaikos OPAP	Marousi	O.A.K.A.	18,989
(Spain) Real Madrid	Madrid	WiZink Center	13,109
(Spain) Valencia Basket	Valencia	La Fonteta	8,500
(Lithuania) Žalgiris	Kaunas	Žalgirio Arena	15,415
(Russia) Zenit Saint Petersburg	Saint Petersburg	Sibur Arena	7,120

=== Personnel and sponsorship ===
Team	Head coach	Captain	Kit manufacturer	Shirt sponsor
(Germany) ALBA Berlin	(Spain) Aíto García Reneses	(Germany) Niels Giffey	Adidas	ALBA SE
(Turkey) Anadolu Efes	(Turkey) Ergin Ataman	(Turkey) Doğuş Balbay	S by Sportive	Anadolu Efes
(Italy) A|X Armani Exchange Milan	(Italy) Ettore Messina	(Italy) Andrea Cinciarini	Armani	Armani Exchange
(Spain) Barcelona	(Serbia) Svetislav Pešić	(Croatia) Ante Tomić	Nike	Assistència Sanitària
(Germany) Bayern Munich	(Serbia) Oliver Kostić	(Germany) Danilo Barthel	Adidas	BayWa
(Serbia) Crvena zvezda mts	(Serbia) Dragan Šakota	(Serbia) Branko Lazić	Nike	mts
(Russia) CSKA Moscow	(Greece) Dimitrios Itoudis	(United States) Kyle Hines	Nike	Rostelecom
(Turkey) Fenerbahçe Beko	(Serbia) Željko Obradović	(Turkey) Melih Mahmutoğlu	Nike	Beko
(Russia) Khimki	(Lithuania) Rimas Kurtinaitis	(Russia) Sergei Monia	Adidas	Khimki Group
(Spain) Kirolbet Baskonia	(Montenegro) Duško Ivanović	(Georgia (country)) Tornike Shengelia	Kelme	Kirolbet
(France) LDLC ASVEL	(Montenegro) Zvezdan Mitrović	(France) Charles Lombahe-Kahudi	Peak	LDLC
(Israel) Maccabi FOX Tel Aviv	(Greece) Ioannis Sfairopoulos	(Israel) John DiBartolomeo	Nike	FOX
(Greece) Olympiacos	(Greece) Georgios Bartzokas	(Greece) Vassilis Spanoulis	Nike	bwin
(Greece) Panathinaikos OPAP	(United States) Rick Pitino	(Greece) Nick Calathes	Adidas	Pame Stoixima
(Spain) Real Madrid	(Spain) Pablo Laso	(Spain) Felipe Reyes	Adidas	Palladium Hotel Group
(Spain) Valencia Basket	(Spain) Jaume Ponsarnau	(Montenegro) Bojan Dubljević	Luanvi	Cultura del Esfuerzo^{1}
(Lithuania) Žalgiris	(Lithuania) Šarūnas Jasikevičius	(Lithuania) Paulius Jankūnas	ŽalgirisShop	
(Russia) Zenit Saint Petersburg	(Spain) Xavi Pascual	(Russia) Evgeny Voronov	Nike	Nipigas

Notes
1. Cultura del Esfuerzo (transl. "Culture of Effort") is the motto of the club.

=== Managerial changes ===
Team	Outgoing manager	Manner of departure	Date of vacancy	Position in table	Replaced with	Date of appointment
(Italy) AX Armani Exchange Milan	(Italy) Simone Pianigiani	Sacked	11 June 2019	Pre-season	(Italy) Ettore Messina	11 June 2019
(Greece) Panathinaikos OPAP	(United States) Rick Pitino	Resigned	21 June 2019	Pre-season	(Greece) Argyris Pedoulakis	21 June 2019
(Greece) Olympiacos	(Israel) David Blatt	Mutual consent	6 October 2019	16th (0–1)	(Lithuania) Kęstutis Kemzūra	20 October 2019
(Serbia) Crvena zvezda mts	(Serbia) (Greece) Milan Tomić	Resigned	22 October 2019	9th (1–2)	(Serbia) Andrija Gavrilović (interim)	22 October 2019
(Greece) Panathinaikos OPAP	(Greece) Argyris Pedoulakis	Sacked	15 November 2019	9th (4–4)	(Greece) Georgios Vovoras (interim)	15 November 2019
(Serbia) Crvena zvezda mts	(Serbia) Andrija Gavrilović	End of caretaker spell	23 November 2019	15th (3–7)	(Serbia) (Greece) Dragan Šakota	23 November 2019
(Greece) Panathinaikos OPAP	(Greece) Georgios Vovoras	End of caretaker spell	26 November 2019	7th (6–4)	(United States) Rick Pitino	26 November 2019
(Spain) Kirolbet Baskonia	(Croatia) Velimir Perasović	Mutual consent	20 December 2019	13th (6–9)	(Montenegro) Duško Ivanović	
(Germany) Bayern Munich	(Montenegro) Dejan Radonjić	Sacked	7 January 2020	15th (6–11)	(Serbia) Oliver Kostić	7 January 2020
(Greece) Olympiacos	(Lithuania) Kęstutis Kemzūra	Sacked	12 January 2020	13th (7–11)	(Greece) Georgios Bartzokas	12 January 2020
(Russia) Zenit Saint Petersburg	(Spain) Joan Plaza	Sacked	12 February 2020	17th (7–17)	(Spain) Xavi Pascual	15 February 2020

== Regular season ==
=== League table ===
Pos	Team	Pld	W	L	PF	PA	PD
1	(Turkey) Anadolu Efes	28	24	4	2432	2166	+266
2	(Spain) Real Madrid	28	22	6	2371	2165	+206
3	(Spain) Barcelona	28	22	6	2357	2193	+164
4	(Russia) CSKA Moscow	28	19	9	2305	2125	+180
5	(Israel) Maccabi Tel Aviv	28	19	9	2291	2164	+127
6	(Greece) Panathinaikos OPAP	28	14	14	2392	2394	−2
7	(Russia) Khimki	28	13	15	2393	2380	+13
8	(Turkey) Fenerbahçe Beko	28	13	15	2153	2188	−35
9	(Lithuania) Žalgiris	28	12	16	2213	2142	+71
10	(Spain) Valencia Basket	28	12	16	2252	2273	−21
11	(Greece) Olympiacos	28	12	16	2243	2282	−39
12	(Italy) A|X Armani Exchange Milan	28	12	16	2163	2236	−73
13	(Spain) Kirolbet Baskonia	28	12	16	2059	2155	−96
14	(Serbia) Crvena zvezda mts	28	11	17	2079	2108	−29
15	(France) LDLC ASVEL	28	10	18	2073	2284	−211
16	(Germany) ALBA Berlin	28	9	19	2304	2423	−119
17	(Germany) Bayern Munich	28	8	20	2064	2281	−217
18	(Russia) Zenit Saint Petersburg	28	8	20	2055	2240	−185

Source: EuroLeague
Rules for classification: All points scored in extra period(s) were not counted in the standings, nor for any tie-break situation.

=== Results ===
Home \ Away	BER	EFS	AXM	FCB	BAY	CZV	CSK	FNB	KHI	KBA	ASV	MTA	OLY	PAO	RMB	VBC	ZAL	ZEN
ALBA Berlin	—	86–99	78–81	80–84	76–77	93–80	66–82	70–74		81–57		89–95	80–99		97–103		69–62	85–65
Anadolu Efes	106–105	—	88–68	64–74	104–75	85–70	80–81		101–82		101–74	99–79	91–79		76–60		96–91	90–88
AX Armani Exchange Milan	96–102	76–81	—	83–70	79–78	67–77		87–74	69–78	81–74		92–88		96–87	73–78	78–71	85–81	73–72
Barcelona	103–84	82–86	84–80	—	83–80	86–82	67–96	89–63			80–67	96–73	90–80	98–86		83–77		90–72
Bayern Munich		63–88	78–64	67–77	—		77–84		74–87	71–80	104–63	80–68	85–82	75–87	95–86	59–66	73–98	77–69
Crvena zvezda mts	85–94	78–85		65–73	93–63	—	81–86	68–56	90–78	64–72	72–74	92–78	88–81	78–73	60–75	76–73	70–76	
CSKA Moscow		80–82	78–75	80–82	79–68	100–74	—	88–70	99–86	94–90			79–84	102–106	60–55	81–70	85–82	86–78
Fenerbahçe Beko	107–102	73–81	73–64	74–80	90–82	66–63		—	89–76	87–80	86–64	77–78			65–94	98–100	76–79	81–84
Khimki	104–87		87–79	94–102		78–72	69–78	82–68	—	79–76	108–79	89–83		103–86	102–94	75–84	83–74	81–83
Kirolbet Baskonia	73–72	77–102		76–74	93–60	71–56	80–70	65–79	83–79	—	79–65	83–113	82–66		55–77		60–74	70–60
LDLC ASVEL	93–81	84–90	89–82		75–65	80–83	67–66	72–88	92–88	66–63	—		82–63	79–78	77–87	72–65	74–79	
Maccabi FOX Tel Aviv	104–78	77–75	69–63	92–85	77–55	84–69	90–80	67–55	80–77		93–62	—	71–70	88–79	77–81	76–63		
Olympiacos	86–93	67–86	91–70		89–72		72–59	87–96	109–98	80–70	77–68	65–90	—	81–78		89–63	83–74	68–77
Panathinaikos OPAP	105–106	86–70	78–79	81–92	98–83	87–82	66–97	81–78		100–68	100–88		99–93	—	75–87	91–80	96–94	96–81
Real Madrid	85–71	75–80	76–67	86–76			97–81	81–77	104–76	70–69	87–78	86–85	93–77	96–78	—	111–99	88–82	
Valencia Basket	91–77	78–83	81–83	76–77	82–56		71–96	86–93	89–84	105–77	81–72	82–85	91–93	94–87		—		94–90
Žalgiris	104–80	68–74	105–97	86–93		59–61			96–85	58–70	70–56	73–68	94–69	85–86	86–73	82–86	—	70–82
Zenit Saint Petersburg	81–83			63–87	68–77	58–65	70–87	68–73	73–87	72–66	75–70	71–82	91–87	79–89	71–86	81–86	76–75	—

Source: EuroLeague
Legend: Blue = home team win; Red = away team win.
Matches with lighter background shading were decided after overtime.

== Attendances ==
=== Average home attendances ===
Pos	Team	Total	High	Low	Average	Change
1	(Lithuania) Žalgiris	199,088	15,342	9,405	14,221	−4.0%
2	(Turkey) Anadolu Efes	170,472	15,173	6,478	13,113	+59.0%
3	(Serbia) Crvena zvezda mts	176,163	16,879	5,432	11,744	+134.4%^{1,5}
4	(Spain) Kirolbet Baskonia	149,252	13,628	8,725	10,661	−4.3%
5	(Israel) Maccabi FOX Tel Aviv	140,528	10,722	3,330	10,038	−4.6%
6	(Germany) ALBA Berlin	129,092	13,212	8,076	9,930	+23.4%^{1}
7	(Turkey) Fenerbahçe Beko	138,079	12,705	7,315	9,863	−8.1%
8	(Greece) Panathinaikos OPAP	138,016	17,396	6,713	9,858	−21.3%^{4}
9	(Spain) Real Madrid	135,081	12,729	7,019	9,649	−1.5%
10	(Italy) AX Armani Exchange Milan	110,388	12,064	6,599	8,491	0.0%^{4}
11	(Spain) Valencia Basket	96,627	7,840	6,954	7,433	+9.5%^{1,4}
12	(Greece) Olympiacos	102,015	10,877	5,516	7,287	−11.2%
13	(Russia) CSKA Moscow	98,693	11,355	4,852	7,050	−2.1%^{2}
14	(Spain) Barcelona	77,701	7,173	3,585	5,977	+3.2%
15	(France) LDLC ASVEL	74,562	5,548	4,491	5,326	+0.8%^{1}
16	(Russia) Khimki	72,650	6,781	2,917	5,189	−5.7%
17	(Germany) Bayern Munich	65,627	5,989	3,524	4,688	+7.8%
18	(Russia) Zenit Saint Petersburg	64,488	6,585	3,020	4,299	+37.9%^{1,3}
	League total	2,138,522	17,396	2,917	8,520	+2.9%

Source: EuroLeague
Notes:
1: 2018–19 season average applied to EuroCup games.
2: CSKA Moscow played one match at Universal Sports Hall CSKA and two at Yantarny Sports Palace, instead of Megasport Arena.
3: Zenit Saint Petersburg played two matches at Yubileyny Sports Palace and one at Basket-Hall Kazan, instead of Sibur Arena.
4: Panathinaikos OPAP, Valencia Basket and AX Armani Exchange Milan played one match behind closed doors, not included in the averages.
5: Crvena zvezda mts played three matches at Aleksandar Nikolić Hall, instead of Štark Arena.

=== Top 10 ===
Pos.	Round	Game	Home team	Visitor	Attendance
1	Regular Season	12	(Greece) Panathinaikos	(Greece) Olympiacos	17,396
2	Regular Season	2	(Serbia) Crvena zvezda mts	(Turkey) Fenerbahçe Beko	16,879
3	Regular Season	17	(Serbia) Crvena zvezda mts	(Germany) Bayern Munich	16,824
4	Regular Season	6	(Serbia) Crvena zvezda mts	(Spain) Real Madrid	16,457
5	Regular Season	19	(Serbia) Crvena zvezda mts	(Lithuania) Žalgiris	15,874
6	Regular Season	7	(Lithuania) Žalgiris	(Spain) Barcelona	15,342
7	Regular Season	15	(Turkey) Anadolu Efes	(Russia) CSKA Moscow	15,173
8	Regular Season	4	(Turkey) Anadolu Efes	(Spain) Real Madrid	15,167
9	Regular Season	1	(Lithuania) Žalgiris	(Spain) Kirolbet Baskonia	15,151
10	Regular Season	3	(Lithuania) Žalgiris	(Spain) Real Madrid	15,109

== Awards ==
All official awards of the 2019–20 EuroLeague.

=== MVP of the Round ===
Regular season

Round	Player	Team	PIR	Ref.
1	(United States) Mike James	(Russia) CSKA Moscow	28	
2	(Serbia) Vasilije Micić	(Turkey) Anadolu Efes	32	
3	(France) Nando de Colo	(Turkey) Fenerbahçe	44	
4	(Georgia (country)) Tornike Shengelia	(Spain) Kirolbet Baskonia	25	
5	(Serbia) Vasilije Micić (2)	(Turkey) Anadolu Efes	29	
6	(Georgia (country)) Tornike Shengelia (2)	(Spain) Kirolbet Baskonia	28	
7	(United States) Cory Higgins	(Spain) Barcelona	33	
8	(United States) Mike James (2)	(Russia) CSKA Moscow	38	
9	(Greece) Nick Calathes	(Greece) Panathinaikos OPAP	32	
9	(United States) Luke Sikma	(Germany) ALBA Berlin	32	
10	(Spain) Nikola Mirotić	(Spain) Barcelona	35	
11	(United States) Shane Larkin	(Turkey) Anadolu Efes	53	
12	(Greece) Kostas Sloukas	(Turkey) Fenerbahçe	39	
13	(United States) Devin Booker	(Russia) Khimki	36	
14	(United States) Mike James (3)	(Russia) CSKA Moscow	32	
15	(United States) Mike James (4)	(Russia) CSKA Moscow	36	
16	(Montenegro) Bojan Dubljević	(Spain) Valencia Basket	42	
17	(Greece) Nick Calathes (2)	(Greece) Panathinaikos OPAP	40	
18	(United States) Shane Larkin (2)	(Turkey) Anadolu Efes	35	
19	(United States) Shane Larkin (3)	(Turkey) Anadolu Efes	30	
20	(United States) Shane Larkin (4)	(Turkey) Anadolu Efes	45	
21	(United States) Shane Larkin (5)	(Turkey) Anadolu Efes	36	
22	(Montenegro) Bojan Dubljević (2)	(Spain) Valencia Basket	26	
23	(Spain) Nikola Mirotić (2)	(Spain) Barcelona	32	
24	(United States) Malcolm Delaney	(Spain) Barcelona	37	
25	(Iceland) Martin Hermannsson	(Germany) ALBA Berlin	27	
26	(Russia) Alexey Shved	(Russia) Khimki	37	
27	(Cape Verde) Edy Tavares	(Spain) Real Madrid	29	
28	(United States) Shane Larkin (6)	(Turkey) Anadolu Efes	44	

=== MVP of the Month ===
Month	Round	Player	Team	Ref.
2019
October	1–6	(Spain) Sergio Rodríguez	(Italy) AX Armani Exchange Milan	
November	7–11	(United States) Shane Larkin	(Turkey) Anadolu Efes	
December	12–16	(Spain) Nikola Mirotić	(Spain) Barcelona	
2020
January	17–22	(United States) Shane Larkin (2)	(Turkey) Anadolu Efes	
February	23–26	(Spain) Nikola Mirotić (2)	(Spain) Barcelona	

== Statistics ==
=== Individual statistics ===
==== Rating ====
Rank	Name	Team	Games	Rating	PIR
1.	(United States) Shane Larkin	(Turkey) Anadolu Efes	25	644	25.76
2.	(Spain) Nikola Mirotić	(Spain) Barcelona	28	629	22.46
3.	(United States) Mike James	(Russia) CSKA Moscow	28	584	20.86

Source: EuroLeague

==== Points ====
Rank	Name	Team	Games	Points	PPG
1.	(United States) Shane Larkin	(Turkey) Anadolu Efes	25	555	22.20
2.	(Russia) Alexey Shved	(Russia) Khimki	26	557	21.42
3.	(United States) Mike James	(Russia) CSKA Moscow	28	590	21.07

Source: EuroLeague

==== Rebounds ====
Rank	Name	Team	Games	Rebounds	RPG
1.	(Serbia) Nikola Milutinov	(Greece) Olympiacos	24	197	8.21
2.	(Nigeria) Tonye Jekiri	(France) LDLC ASVEL	27	202	7.48
3.	(Cape Verde) Edy Tavares	(Spain) Real Madrid	28	199	7.11

Source: EuroLeague

==== Assists ====
Rank	Name	Team	Games	Assists	APG
1.	(Greece) Nick Calathes	(Greece) Panathinaikos OPAP	28	255	9.11
2.	(Argentina) Facundo Campazzo	(Spain) Real Madrid	28	199	7.11
3.	(Russia) Alexey Shved	(Russia) Khimki	26	162	6.23

Source: EuroLeague

==== Other statistics ====
Category	Player	Team	Games	Average
Steals	(United States) Pierriá Henry	(Spain) Kirolbet Baskonia	25	1.60
Blocks	(Cape Verde) Edy Tavares	(Spain) Real Madrid	28	2.18
Turnovers	(Russia) Alexey Shved	(Russia) Khimki	26	3.92
Fouls drawn	(United States) Mike James	(Russia) CSKA Moscow	28	5.93
Minutes	(Greece) Nick Calathes	(Greece) Panathinaikos OPAP	28	32:11
FT %	(United States) Tyler Cavanaugh	(Germany) ALBA Berlin	19	96.97%
2-Point %	(Lithuania) Artūras Milaknis	(Lithuania) Žalgiris	28	70.59%
3-Point %	(Serbia) Stefan Jović	(Russia) Khimki	23	53.19%

=== Individual game highs ===
Category	Player	Team	Statistic	Opponent
Rating	(United States) Shane Larkin	(Turkey) Anadolu Efes	53	(Germany) Bayern Munich (Nov 29, 2019)
Points	(United States) Shane Larkin	(Turkey) Anadolu Efes	49	(Germany) Bayern Munich (Nov 29, 2019)
Rebounds	(Nigeria) Tonye Jekiri	(France) LDLC ASVEL	19	(Serbia) Crvena zvezda mts (Nov 15, 2019)
Assists	(Argentina) Facundo Campazzo	(Spain) Real Madrid	19	(Germany) ALBA Berlin (Feb 6, 2020)
Steals	(United States) Pierriá Henry	(Spain) Kirolbet Baskonia	7	(Turkey) Fenerbahçe Beko (Jan 9, 2020)
Blocks	(Senegal) Youssoupha Fall	(Spain) Kirolbet Baskonia	5	(Lithuania) Žalgiris (Oct 4, 2019)
Blocks	(Cape Verde) Edy Tavares	(Spain) Real Madrid	5	(Serbia) Crvena zvezda mts (Nov 7, 2019)
Blocks	(United States) Quincy Acy	(Israel) Maccabi FOX Tel Aviv	5	(Greece) Panathinaikos OPAP (Dec 19, 2019)
Blocks	(Greece) Georgios Papagiannis	(Greece) Panathinaikos OPAP	5	(France) LDLC ASVEL (Jan 24, 2020)
Blocks	(Cape Verde) Edy Tavares	(Spain) Real Madrid	5	(Israel) Maccabi FOX Tel Aviv (Jan 30, 2020)

=== Team statistics ===
Category	Team	Average
Rating	(Turkey) Anadolu Efes	103.82
Points	(Turkey) Anadolu Efes	87.25
Points Allowed	(Serbia) Crvena zvezda mts	76.75
Rebounds	(Russia) CSKA Moscow	37.79
Assists	(Spain) Real Madrid	19.82
Steals	(Israel) Maccabi FOX Tel Aviv	7.75
Blocks	(Spain) Real Madrid	4.04
Turnovers	(Germany) Bayern Munich	15.00
FT %	(Turkey) Anadolu Efes	86.04%
2-Point %	(Turkey) Anadolu Efes	57.10%
3-Point %	(Turkey) Anadolu Efes	42.10%

== See also ==
- 2019–20 EuroCup Basketball
- 2019–20 Basketball Champions League
- 2019–20 FIBA Europe Cup
