= Greek Basketball League Best Coach =

The Greek Basket League Best Coach, or Greek League Coach of the Year (COY), is an annual award for the best coach of each season of Greece's top-tier level professional basketball club league, the Greek Basketball League, (GBL).

== Best Coaches ==
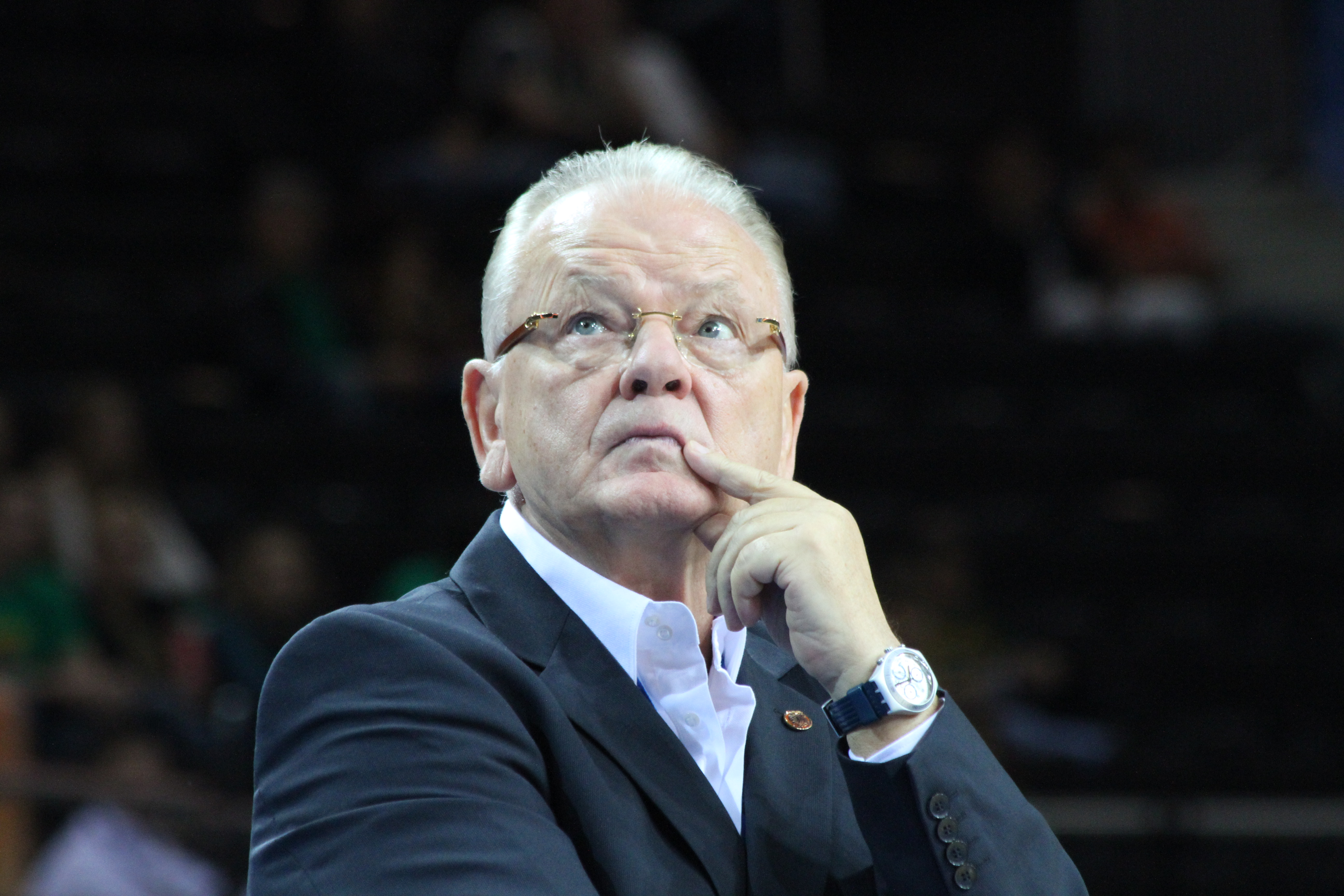
Dušan Ivković was the Greek League Best Coach two times (1997 and 2012).

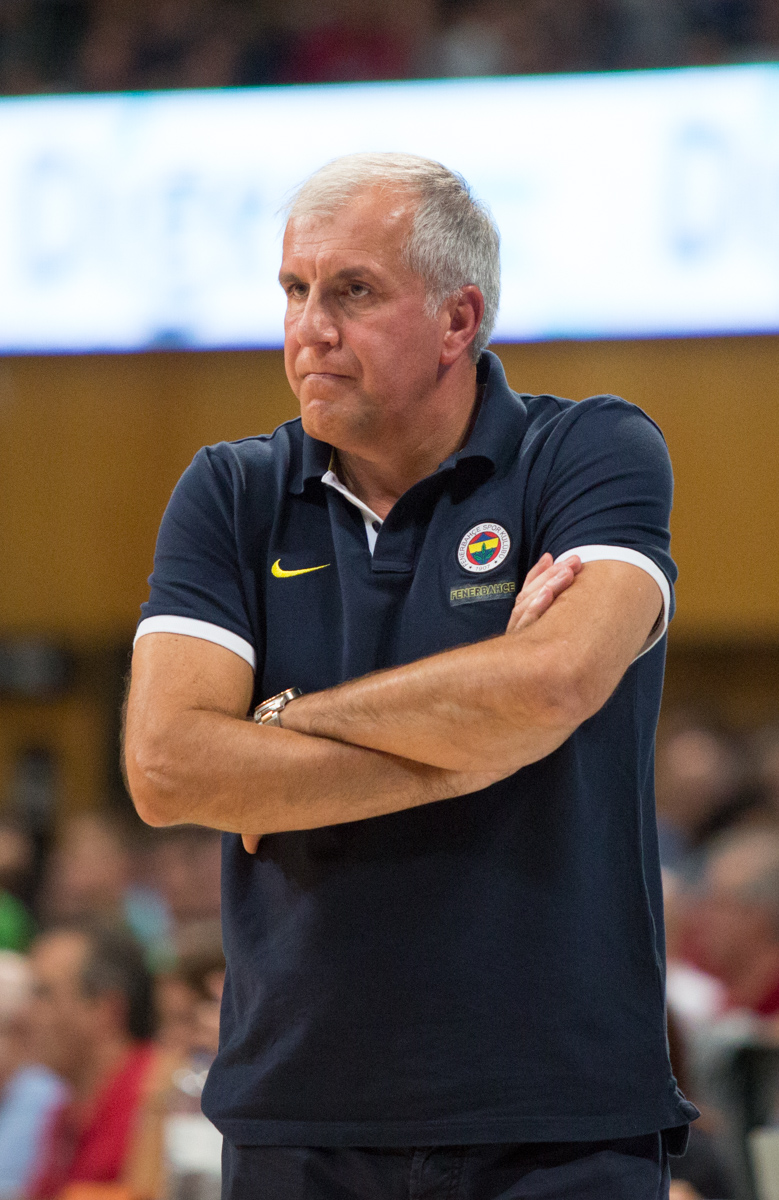
Željko Obradović was the Greek League Best Coach five times (2000, 2005, 2007, 2009, and 2011).

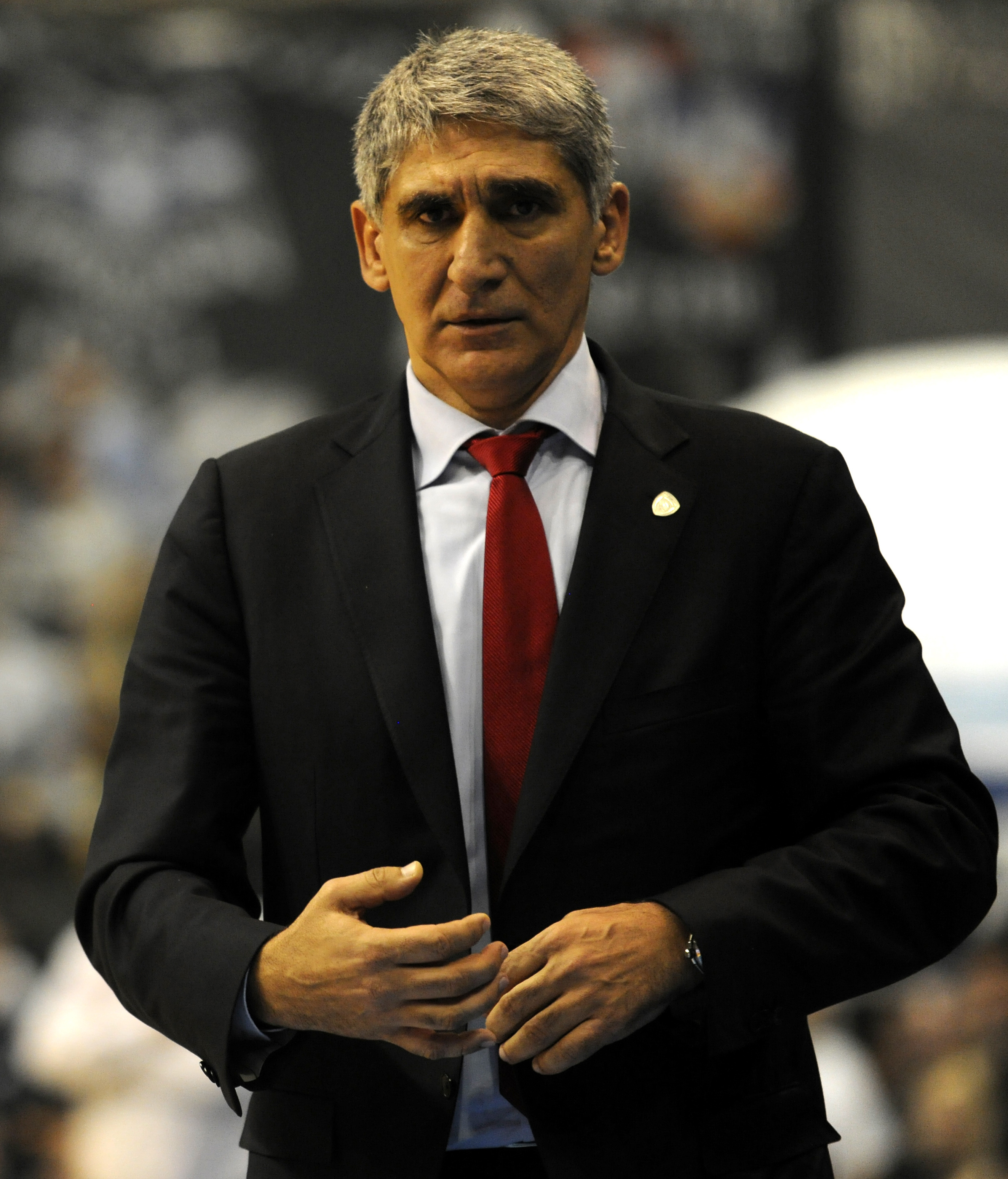
Panagiotis Giannakis was the Greek League Best Coach two times (2004 and 2006).

Giorgos Bartzokas was the Greek League Best Coach three times (2010, 2023 and 2026).

Season	Best Coach	Club	Ref.
1996–97	(Federal Republic of Yugoslavia) Dušan Ivković	Olympiacos	
1997–98	(Slovenia) / (Greece) Lefteris Subotić	Panathinaikos	
1998–99	(Slovenia) / (Greece) Lefteris Subotić (2×)	Panathinaikos	
1999–00	(Federal Republic of Yugoslavia) Željko Obradović	Panathinaikos	
2000–01	(Greece) Argyris Pedoulakis	Peristeri	
2001–02	(Greece) Kostas Pilafidis	Iraklis	
2002–03	(Greece) Argyris Pedoulakis (2×)	Peristeri	
2003–04	(Greece) Panagiotis Giannakis	Maroussi	
2004–05	(Serbia and Montenegro) Željko Obradović (2×)	Panathinaikos	
2005–06	(Greece) Panagiotis Giannakis (2×)	Maroussi	
2006–07	(Serbia) Željko Obradović (3×)	Panathinaikos	
2007–08	(Greece) Soulis Markopoulos	Maroussi	
2008–09	(Serbia) Željko Obradović (4×)	Panathinaikos	
2009–10	(Greece) Giorgos Bartzokas	Maroussi	
2010–11	(Serbia) Željko Obradović (5×)	Panathinaikos	
2011–12	(Serbia) Dušan Ivković (2×)	Olympiacos	
2012–13	(Greece) Argyris Pedoulakis (3×)	Panathinaikos	
2013–14	(Greece) Soulis Markopoulos (2×)	PAOK	
2014–15	(Greece) Ioannis Sfairopoulos	Olympiacos	
2015–16	(Greece) Dimitris Priftis	Aris	
2016–17	(Spain) Xavi Pascual	Panathinaikos	
2017–18	(Spain) Xavi Pascual (2×)	Panathinaikos	
2018–19	(Greece) Makis Giatras	Promitheas Patras	
2019–20	Not awarded ^{1}		
2020–21	(Greece) Christos Serelis	Lavrio	
2021–22	(Greece) Fotis Takianos	Larisa	
2022–23	(Greece) Giorgos Bartzokas (2×)	Olympiacos	
2023–24	(Turkey) Ergin Ataman	Panathinaikos	
2024–25	(Italy) Massimo Cancellieri	PAOK	
2025–26	(Greece) Giorgos Bartzokas (3×)	Olympiacos	

Notes:

^1 There was no awarding in the 2019–20, due to the coronavirus pandemic in Europe.

== See also ==
- Head coaches with the most wins in the Greek Basketball Championship
