= 2021–22 EuroLeague =

Sports season

2021–22 Turkish Airlines EuroLeague^{1}
- Season: 2021–22
- Duration: 30 September 2021 – 8 April 2022 (Regular Season); 19 April 2022 – 4 May 2022 (Playoffs); 19 May 2022 – 21 May 2022 (Final Four)
- Games played: 283
- Teams: 18 (15 after the suspension of the Russian teams due to the 2022 Russian invasion of Ukraine)

Regular season
- Top seed: (Spain) Barcelona
- Season MVP: (Spain) Nikola Mirotić

Final Four
- Champions: (Turkey) Anadolu Efes (2nd title)
- Runners-up: (Spain) Real Madrid
- Third place: (Spain) Barcelona
- Fourth place: (Greece) Olympiacos
- Final Four MVP: (Serbia) Vasilije Micić

Statistical leaders
Points	(Serbia) Vasilije Micić	18.2
Rebounds	(Greece) Georgios Papagiannis	8.2
Assists	(Greece) Nick Calathes	6.4
Index Rating	(Spain) Nikola Mirotić	20.1

Records
- Biggest home win: Fenerbahçe 80–41 UNICS (14 October 2021)
- Biggest away win: Baskonia 60–88 Real Madrid (25 November 2021)
- Highest scoring: Barcelona 111–109 UNICS (22 December 2021)
- Winning streak: 9 games Barcelona; Real Madrid
- Losing streak: 9 games Žalgiris
- Highest attendance: 15,092; Anadolu Efes 93–90 Real Madrid (22 March 2022)
- Lowest attendance: 0 officially five matches
- All statistics correct as of 21 May 2022.^{1} Sponsored league name, referring to Turkish Airlines.

The 2021–22 Turkish Airlines EuroLeague was the 22nd season of the modern era of the EuroLeague, and the 12th under the title sponsorship of the Turkish Airlines. Including the competition's previous incarnation as the FIBA Europe Champions Cup, this was the 65th season of the premier basketball competition for European men's clubs. The season started on 30 September 2021. The three Russian teams were suspended because of the 2022 Russian invasion of Ukraine. As the Russian invasion of Ukraine did not cease, the records of all regular season matches against Russian teams were annulled, and team win-loss records adjusted accordingly, dramatically affecting league standings.

Anadolu Efes successfully defended last year's title after defeating Real Madrid in the championship game.

== Team allocation ==
ALBA Berlin was awarded with a two-year wild card Turkish Airlines EuroLeague license. Bayern Munich and LDLC ASVEL have received long-term licenses.

=== Distribution ===
The following is the access list for this season.

Access list for 2021–22 EuroLeague
	Teams entering in this round	Teams advancing from previous round
Regular season (18 teams)	13 licensed clubs with a long-term licence; 5 associated clubs with an annual licence; 1 two-year wild card; 2 one-year wild cards; 2 EuroCup Finalists	
Playoffs (8 teams)		8 highest-placed teams from the regular season
Final Four (4 teams)		4 series winners from the playoffs

=== Qualified teams ===
The labels in the parentheses show how each team qualified for the place of its starting round:

Qualified teams for 2021–22 EuroLeague Licensed clubs
(Spanish Basketball Federation) Barcelona	(Hellenic Basketball Federation) Olympiacos	(Turkish Basketball Federation) Anadolu Efes	(Lithuanian Basketball Federation) Žalgiris
(Spanish Basketball Federation) Baskonia	(Hellenic Basketball Federation) Panathinaikos	(Turkish Basketball Federation) Fenerbahçe	(Russian Basketball Federation) CSKA Moscow
(Spanish Basketball Federation) Real Madrid	(Israeli Basketball Association) Maccabi Tel Aviv	(Italian Basketball Federation) Olimpia Milano	(German Basketball Federation) Bayern Munich
(French Federation of Basketball) ASVEL

Associated clubs
(German Basketball Federation) ALBA Berlin (WC)	(French Federation of Basketball) AS Monaco (EC)	(Russian Basketball Federation) UNICS (EC)	(Basketball Federation of Serbia) Crvena zvezda (WC)
(Russian Basketball Federation) Zenit Saint Petersburg (WC)

Notes

1. France (FRA): AS Monaco is a club based in Monaco (which does not qualify for European competitions), but participate in European competitions through one of the berths for France (any coefficient points it earns count toward France).

== Teams ==
=== Venues and locations ===
Location of teams in 2021-22 EuroLeague

Team	Home city	Arena	Capacity
(German Basketball Federation) ALBA Berlin	Berlin	Mercedes-Benz Arena	14,500
(Turkish Basketball Federation) Anadolu Efes	Istanbul	Sinan Erdem Dome	16,000
(Italian Basketball Federation) A|X Armani Exchange Milan	Milan	Mediolanum Forum	12,700
(Spanish Basketball Federation) Barcelona	Barcelona	Palau Blaugrana	7,585
(Spanish Basketball Federation) Bitci Baskonia	Vitoria-Gasteiz	Buesa Arena	15,504
(German Basketball Federation) Bayern Munich	Munich	Audi Dome	6,500
(Basketball Federation of Serbia) Crvena zvezda mts	Belgrade	Štark Arena	18,386
(Basketball Federation of Serbia) Crvena zvezda mts	Belgrade	Aleksandar Nikolić Hall	8,000
(Russian Basketball Federation) ~~CSKA Moscow~~	~~Moscow~~	~~Megasport Arena~~	~~13,344~~
(Turkish Basketball Federation) Fenerbahçe Beko	Istanbul	Ülker Sports and Event Hall	13,059
(French Federation of Basketball) LDLC ASVEL	Villeurbanne	Astroballe	5,556
(Israeli Basketball Association) Maccabi Tel Aviv	Tel Aviv	Menora Mivtachim Arena	10,383
(French Federation of Basketball) AS Monaco	Monaco	Salle Gaston Médecin	4,090
(Hellenic Basketball Federation) Olympiacos	Piraeus	Peace and Friendship Stadium	11,847
(Hellenic Basketball Federation) Panathinaikos OPAP	Athens	OAKA Altion	18,989
(Spanish Basketball Federation) Real Madrid	Madrid	WiZink Center	13,109
(Russian Basketball Federation) ~~UNICS~~	~~Kazan~~	~~Basket-Hall Kazan~~	~~7,482~~
(Lithuanian Basketball Federation) Žalgiris	Kaunas	Žalgirio arena	15,415
(Russian Basketball Federation) ~~Zenit Saint Petersburg~~	~~Saint Petersburg~~	~~Sibur Arena~~	~~7,120~~
(Russian Basketball Federation) ~~Zenit Saint Petersburg~~	~~Saint Petersburg~~	~~Yubileyny Sports Palace~~	~~7,044~~

=== Managerial changes ===
Team	Outgoing manager	Manner of departure	Date of vacancy	Position in table	Replaced with	Date of appointment
(Hellenic Basketball Federation) Panathinaikos	(Israeli Basketball Association) Oded Kattash	Mutual consent	26 June 2021	Pre-season	(Hellenic Basketball Federation) Dimitrios Priftis	26 June 2021
(Russian Basketball Federation) UNICS	(Hellenic Basketball Federation) Dimitrios Priftis	Signed by Panathinaikos	26 June 2021	Pre-season	(Croatian Basketball Federation) Velimir Perasović	29 June 2021
(Turkish Basketball Federation) Fenerbahçe	(Basketball Federation of Serbia) Igor Kokoškov	Parted ways	27 July 2021	Pre-season	(Basketball Federation of Serbia) Aleksandar Đorđević	31 July 2021
(German Basketball Federation) ALBA Berlin	(Spanish Basketball Federation) Aíto García Reneses	Sabbatical	17 August 2021	Pre-season	(Spanish Basketball Federation) Israel González	17 August 2021
(Lithuanian Basketball Federation) Žalgiris	(Basketball Austria) Martin Schiller	Sacked	8 October 2021	18th (0–2)	(Basketball Federation of Slovenia) Jure Zdovc	8 October 2021
(Spanish Basketball Federation) Baskonia	(Basketball Federation of Montenegro) Duško Ivanović	Sacked	15 November 2021	16th (3–6)	(Croatian Basketball Federation) Neven Spahija	15 November 2021
(French Federation of Basketball) AS Monaco	(Basketball Federation of Montenegro) Zvezdan Mitrović	Mutual consent	13 December 2021	14th (5–9)	(Basketball Federation of Serbia) Saša Obradović	13 December 2021
(Israeli Basketball Association) Maccabi Tel Aviv	(Hellenic Basketball Federation) Ioannis Sfairopoulos	Sacked	15 February 2022	12th (11–12)	(Israeli Basketball Association) Avi Even (interim)	15 February 2022

=== Referees ===
A total of 72 Euroleague Basketball officials set to work on the 2021–22 season in EuroLeague and EuroCup:

- (Albanian Basketball Association) Gentian Cici
- (Argentine Basketball Confederation) Leandro Lezcano
- (Basketball Belgium) Nick van den Broeck
- (Croatian Basketball Federation) Denis Hadžić
- (Croatian Basketball Federation) Josip Radojković
- (Croatian Basketball Federation) Luka Kardum
- (Croatian Basketball Federation) Sreten Radović
- (Croatian Basketball Federation) Tomislav Hordov
- (Czech Basketball Federation) Robert Vyklický
- (Estonian Basketball Association) Aare Halliko
- (Estonian Basketball Association) Rain Peerandi
- (French Federation of Basketball) Hugues Thépénier
- (French Federation of Basketball) Joseph Bissang
- (French Federation of Basketball) Maxime Boubert
- (French Federation of Basketball) Mehdi Difallah
- (German Basketball Federation) Anne Panther
- (German Basketball Federation) Benjamin Barth
- (German Basketball Federation) Robert Lottermoser
- (German Basketball Federation) Steve Bittner
- (British Basketball) Eduard Udyanskyy
- (Hellenic Basketball Federation) Elias Koromilas
- (Hellenic Basketball Federation) Ioannis Foufis
- (Hellenic Basketball Federation) Vasileios Pitsilkas
- (Hellenic Basketball Federation) Vasiliki Tsaroucha
- (Israeli Basketball Association) Adar Peer
- (Israeli Basketball Association) Amit Balak
- (Israeli Basketball Association) Seffi Shemmesh
- (Italian Basketball Federation) Carmelo Paternicò
- (Italian Basketball Federation) Guido Giovannetti
- (Italian Basketball Federation) Luigi Lamonica
- (Italian Basketball Federation) Michele Rossi
- (Latvian Basketball Association) Kristaps Konstantinovs
- (Latvian Basketball Association) Oļegs Latiševs
- (Lithuanian Basketball Federation) Artūras Šukys
- (Lithuanian Basketball Federation) Gytis Vilius
- (Lithuanian Basketball Federation) Jurgis Laurinavičius
- (Basketball Federation of Montenegro) Igor Dragojević
- (Basketball Federation of Montenegro) Miloš Koljenšić
- (Polish Basketball Federation) Jakub Zamojski
- (Polish Basketball Federation) Marcin Kowalski
- (Polish Basketball Federation) Piotr Pastusiak
- (Polish Basketball Federation) Tomasz Trawicki
- (Portuguese Basketball Federation) Fernando Rocha
- (Portuguese Basketball Federation) Sérgio Silva
- (Russian Basketball Federation) Artem Lavrukhin
- (Russian Basketball Federation) Stanislav Valeev
- (Basketball Federation of Serbia) Ilija Belošević
- (Basketball Federation of Serbia) Marko Juras
- (Basketball Federation of Serbia) Milivoje Jovčić
- (Basketball Federation of Serbia) Uroš Nikolić
- (Basketball Federation of Serbia) Uroš Obrknežević
- (Basketball Federation of Slovenia) Damir Javor
- (Basketball Federation of Slovenia) Mario Majkić
- (Basketball Federation of Slovenia) Matej Boltauzer
- (Basketball Federation of Slovenia) Milan Nedović
- (Basketball Federation of Slovenia) Saša Pukl
- (Basketball Federation of Slovenia) Sašo Petek
- (Spanish Basketball Federation) Benjamín Jiménez
- (Spanish Basketball Federation) Carlos Cortés
- (Spanish Basketball Federation) Carlos Peruga
- (Spanish Basketball Federation) Daniel Hierrezuelo
- (Spanish Basketball Federation) Emilio Pérez
- (Spanish Basketball Federation) Jordi Aliaga
- (Spanish Basketball Federation) Juan Carlos García
- (Spanish Basketball Federation) Miguel Ángel Pérez
- (Swedish Basketball Federation) Saulius Račys
- (Swiss Basketball) Sébastien Clivaz
- (Turkish Basketball Federation) Emin Moğulkoç
- (Turkish Basketball Federation) Hüseyin Çelik
- (Turkish Basketball Federation) Sinan Isguder
- (Basketball Federation of Ukraine) Borys Ryzhyk
- (Basketball Federation of Ukraine) Mykola Ambrosov

== Regular season ==
=== League table ===
Pos	Team	Pld	W	L	PF	PA	PD	Qualification
1	(Spanish Basketball Federation) Barcelona	28	21	7	2275	2101	+174	Qualification to playoffs
2	(Hellenic Basketball Federation) Olympiacos	28	19	9	2222	2045	+177	Qualification to playoffs
3	(Italian Basketball Federation) A|X Armani Exchange Milan	28	19	9	2069	1992	+77	Qualification to playoffs
4	(Spanish Basketball Federation) Real Madrid	28	18	10	2181	2079	+102	Qualification to playoffs
5	(Israeli Basketball Association) Maccabi Tel Aviv	28	17	11	2272	2209	+63	Qualification to playoffs
6	(Turkish Basketball Federation) Anadolu Efes	28	16	12	2322	2221	+101	Qualification to playoffs
7	(French Federation of Basketball) AS Monaco	28	15	13	2311	2225	+86	Qualification to playoffs
8	(German Basketball Federation) Bayern Munich	28	14	14	2123	2105	+18	Qualification to playoffs
9	(Spanish Basketball Federation) Bitci Baskonia	28	12	16	2116	2186	−70	
10	(German Basketball Federation) ALBA Berlin	28	12	16	2121	2239	−118	
11	(Basketball Federation of Serbia) Crvena zvezda mts	28	12	16	2041	2089	−48	
12	(Turkish Basketball Federation) Fenerbahçe Beko	28	10	18	2051	2099	−48	
13	(Hellenic Basketball Federation) Panathinaikos OPAP	28	9	19	2089	2235	−146	
14	(French Federation of Basketball) LDLC ASVEL	28	8	20	2036	2239	−203	
15	(Lithuanian Basketball Federation) Žalgiris	28	8	20	2084	2249	−165	
16	(Russian Basketball Federation) Zenit Saint Petersburg	0	0	0	0	0	0	Excluded
17	(Russian Basketball Federation) CSKA Moscow	0	0	0	0	0	0	Excluded
18	(Russian Basketball Federation) UNICS	0	0	0	0	0	0	Excluded

Source: EuroLeague
Rules for classification: All points scored in extra period(s) were not counted in the standings, nor for any tie-break situation.

=== Regulations ===
When more than two teams are tied, the ranking was established taking into account the victories obtained in the games played only among them. Should the tie persist among some, but not all, of the teams, the ranking of the teams still tied was determined by again taking into account the victories in the games played only among them, and repeating this same procedure until the tie is entirely resolved. If a tie persists, the ranking was determined by the goal difference in favour and against in the games played only among the teams still tied.

=== Results ===
Home \ Away	BER	EFS	ASM	AXM	FCB	BKN	BAY	CZV	CSK	FNB	ASV	MTA	OLY	PAO	RMB	UNK	ZAL	ZEN
ALBA Berlin	—	63–90	92–84	81–76	79–95	76–80	69–82	74–70	90–93	84–70	67–71	91–86	90–75	87–78	74–89	81–53	82–74	76–67
Anadolu Efes	87–77	—	98–77	77–83	93–95	87–72	81–76	84–83	96–100	84–79	78–72	109–77	88–69	82–81	93–90	71–68	94–60	79–90
AS Monaco	91–74	102–80	—	65–71	81–85	78–68	94–71	70–62	97–80	92–78	84–85	82–76	92–72	75–63	84–90	79–76	82–83	74–85
A|X Armani Exchange Milan	84–76	75–71	63–72	—	75–70	89–78	84–77	79–62	84–74	60–71	73–72	83–72	72–93	75–54	73–75	–^{1}	65–58	–^{1}
Barcelona	96–64	82–77	88–83	73–75	—	93–67	71–66	82–70	81–73	88–67	84–71	80–104	79–78	86–60	93–80	111–109	96–73	84–58
Bitci Baskonia	85–68	87–74	78–66	64–78	94–75	—	77–84	93–74	74–80	77–62	91–66	69–87	62–72	81–79	60–88	–^{1}	96–79	82–90
Bayern Munich	62–56	83–71	78–83	83–77	72–80	76–81	—	82–57	–^{1}	71–63	73–65	70–52	88–98	81–78	76–80	–^{1}	74–65	–^{1}
Crvena zvezda mts	63–78	93–85	80–91	57–63	69–76	86–83	81–78	—	–^{1}	74–69	73–67	84–77	81–76	81–48	65–62	78–98	73–61	76–80
CSKA Moscow	91–72	97–99	–^{1}	57–67	–^{1}	–^{1}	77–74	78–76	—	82–91	90–83	74–73	88–82	97–77	–^{1}	67–88	–^{1}	77–67
Fenerbahçe Beko	57–66	84–89	96–86	43–68	74–76	75–53	81–76	61–57	–^{1}	—	85–76	90–79	94–80	59–62	66–51	80–41	73–67	–^{1}
LDLC ASVEL	80–82	75–73	75–100	80–81	60–80	69–72	68–77	69–67	70–68	84–82	—	85–93	80–94	63–76	74–87	85–82	88–76	61–71
Maccabi Tel Aviv	87–78	78–92	95–84	75–58	85–68	94–93	69–68	63–75	84–75	85–76	94–73	—	84–69	77–73	75–74	74–85	76–62	–^{1}
Olympiacos	87–83	87–85	86–65	67–58	73–66	75–50	83–60	72–76	–^{1}	67–65	89–54	90–73	—	101–73	74–68	–^{1}	83–68	–^{1}
Panathinaikos OPAP	82–67	95–69	83–91	75–76	82–85	75–63	80–67	79–73	74–98	91–87	70–84	83–95	65–84	—	87–86	72–74	83–96	70–64
Real Madrid	87–64	82–69	94–86	92–88	68–86	89–74	88–97	79–67	71–65	70–69	70–58	72–70	75–67	88–65	—	85–68	95–82	85–64
UNICS	85–71	75–67	80–88	97–71	70–64	83–69	73–70	77–84	75–86	–^{1}	–^{1}	–^{1}	84–87	–^{1}	65–58	—	66–53	69–70
Žalgiris	71–79	71–85	98–107	70–74	91–84	72–68	73–75	103–98	51–73	86–75	68–72	78–94	73–84	76–69	68–47	67–76	—	64–70
Zenit Saint Petersburg	75–66	76–67	77–86	74–70	–^{1}	83–54	79–71	58–69	–^{1}	80–86	–^{1}	73–71	84–78	–^{1}	68–75	–^{1}	–^{1}	—

Source: EuroLeague
Legend: Blue = home team win; Red = away team win.
Matches with lighter background shading were decided after overtime.

^{1}Participation of Russian teams is suspended due to the 2022 Russian invasion of Ukraine, in accordance with the decision of the Euroleague Commercial Assets (ECA) Shareholders Executive Board of 28 February.

== Playoffs ==
Playoffs series are best-of-five. The first team to win three games wins the series. A 2–2–1 format is used – teams with home-court advantage play games 1, 2, and 5 at home, while their opponents host games 3 and 4. Games 4 and 5 are only played if necessary. The four winning teams advance to the Final Four.

=== Series ===
Team 1	Series	Team 2	Game 1	Game 2	Game 3	Game 4	Game 5
Barcelona (Spain)	3–2	(Germany) Bayern Munich	77–67	75–90	75–66	52–59	81–72
Real Madrid (Spain)	3–0	(Israel) Maccabi Tel Aviv	84–74	95–66	87–76	–	–
A|X Armani Exchange Milan (Italy)	1–3	(Turkey) Anadolu Efes	48–64	73–66	65–77	70–75	–
Olympiacos (Greece)	3–2	(France) AS Monaco	71–54	72–96	87–83	77–78	94–88

== Final Four ==
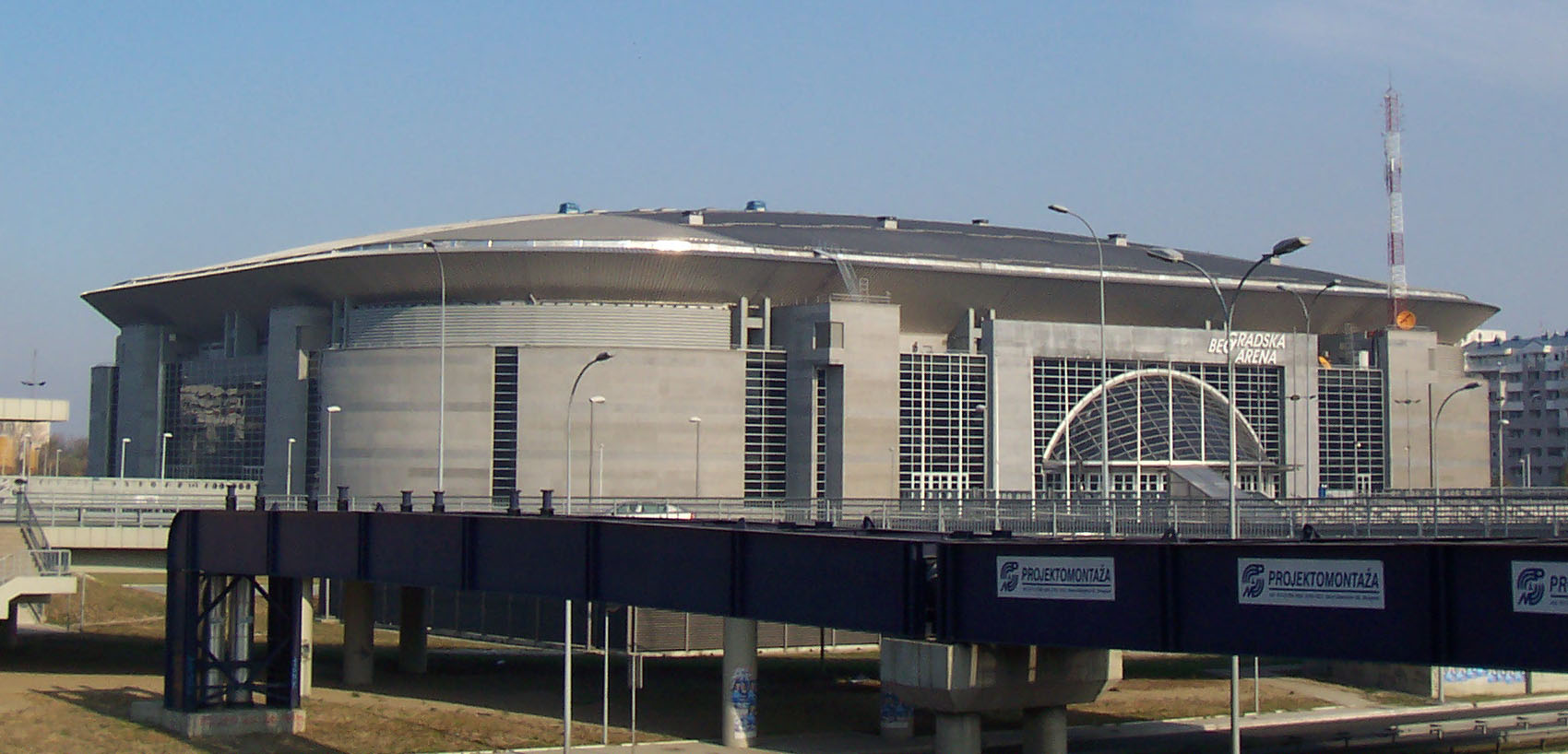
Štark Arena in Belgrade, Serbia

The Final Four, held over a single weekend, is the last phase of the season. The four remaining teams play a single knockout round on Thursday evening, with the two winners advancing to the championship game. Saturday starts with the third-place game, followed by the championship game. The 2022 EuroLeague Final Four was played at the Štark Arena in Belgrade, Serbia, on 19–21 May 2022.

Semifinals
19 May
(Spanish Basketball Federation) Barcelona	83
(Spanish Basketball Federation) Real Madrid	86
19 May
(Hellenic Basketball Federation) Olympiacos	74
(Turkish Basketball Federation) Anadolu Efes	77

Championship game
21 May
(Spanish Basketball Federation) Real Madrid	57
(Turkish Basketball Federation) Anadolu Efes	58
Third place game
21 May
(Spanish Basketball Federation) Barcelona	84
(Hellenic Basketball Federation) Olympiacos	74

== Awards ==
All official awards of the 2021–22 EuroLeague.

=== EuroLeague MVP ===
- (Spain) Nikola Mirotić ( (Spanish Basketball Federation) Barcelona)

=== EuroLeague Final Four MVP ===
- (Serbia) Vasilije Micić ( (Turkish Basketball Federation) Anadolu Efes)

=== All-EuroLeague Teams ===
Pos.	First Team		Second Team	
G	(United States) Mike James	(French Federation of Basketball) AS Monaco	(Greece) Kostas Sloukas	(Hellenic Basketball Federation) Olympiacos
G	(Turkey) Shane Larkin	(Turkish Basketball Federation) Anadolu Efes	(Serbia) Vasilije Micić	(Turkish Basketball Federation) Anadolu Efes
F	(Bulgaria) Sasha Vezenkov	(Hellenic Basketball Federation) Olympiacos	(Serbia) Vladimir Lučić	(German Basketball Federation) Bayern Munich
F	(Spain) Nikola Mirotić	(Spanish Basketball Federation) Barcelona	(Denmark) Shavon Shields	(Italian Basketball Federation) A|X Armani Exchange Milan
C	(Cape Verde) Edy Tavares	(Spanish Basketball Federation) Real Madrid	(Greece) Georgios Papagiannis	(Hellenic Basketball Federation) Panathinaikos OPAP

=== Alphonso Ford Top Scorer Trophy ===
- (Serbia) Vasilije Micić ( (Turkish Basketball Federation) Anadolu Efes)

=== Best Defender ===
- (United States) Kyle Hines ( (Italian Basketball Federation) A|X Armani Exchange Milan)

=== Rising Star ===
- (Lithuania) Rokas Jokubaitis ( (Spanish Basketball Federation) Barcelona)

=== Coach of the Year ===
- (Greece) Georgios Bartzokas ( (Greece) Olympiacos)

=== MVP of the Round ===
Regular season

Round	Player	Team	PIR	Ref.
1	(United States) Scottie Wilbekin	(Israeli Basketball Association) Maccabi Tel Aviv	32	
2	(Georgia (country)) Tornike Shengelia	(Russian Basketball Federation) CSKA Moscow	29	
3	(Georgia (country)) Tornike Shengelia (2)	(Russian Basketball Federation) CSKA Moscow	37	
4	(Uganda) Brandon Davies	(Spanish Basketball Federation) Barcelona	38	
5	(United States) Will Clyburn	(Russian Basketball Federation) CSKA Moscow	32	
6	(United States) Daryl Macon	(Hellenic Basketball Federation) Panathinaikos	38	
7	(France) Élie Okobo	(French Federation of Basketball) LDLC ASVEL	37	
8	(United States) Chris Jones	(French Federation of Basketball) LDLC ASVEL	27	
9	(Spain) Nikola Mirotić	(Spanish Basketball Federation) Barcelona	37	
10	(United States) Scottie Wilbekin (2)	(Israeli Basketball Association) Maccabi Tel Aviv	37	
11	(United States) Lorenzo Brown	(Russian Basketball Federation) UNICS	31	
12	(France) William Howard	(French Federation of Basketball) LDLC ASVEL	33	
13	(Bulgaria) Sasha Vezenkov	(Hellenic Basketball Federation) Olympiacos	36	
14	(Spain) Nikola Mirotić (2)	(Spanish Basketball Federation) Barcelona	39	
15	(United States) Mike James	(French Federation of Basketball) AS Monaco	31	
15	(Serbia) Vasilije Micić	(Turkish Basketball Federation) Anadolu Efes	31	
16	(Turkey) Shane Larkin	(Turkish Basketball Federation) Anadolu Efes	37	
17	(United States) Wade Baldwin	(Spanish Basketball Federation) Bitci Baskonia	33	
18	(United States) Billy Baron	(Russian Basketball Federation) Zenit Saint Petersburg	30	
19	(Turkey) Shane Larkin (2)	(Turkish Basketball Federation) Anadolu Efes	30	
20	(Italy) Daniel Hackett	(Russian Basketball Federation) CSKA Moscow	26	
21	(Italy) Daniel Hackett (2)	(Russian Basketball Federation) CSKA Moscow	38	
22	(Croatia) Ante Žižić	(Israeli Basketball Association) Maccabi Tel Aviv	33	
23	(Serbia) Nikola Milutinov	(Russian Basketball Federation) CSKA Moscow	28	
24	(United States) James Nunnally	(Israeli Basketball Association) Maccabi Tel Aviv	38	
25	(Serbia) Nikola Milutinov (2)	(Russian Basketball Federation) CSKA Moscow	36	
26	(Argentina) Nicolás Laprovíttola	(Spanish Basketball Federation) Barcelona	27	
27	(Serbia) Vasilije Micić (2)	(Turkish Basketball Federation) Anadolu Efes	30	
28	(Australia) Dante Exum	(Spanish Basketball Federation) Barcelona	31	
29	(Germany) Maodo Lô	(German Basketball Federation) Alba Berlin	34	
30	(United States) Wade Baldwin (2)	(Spanish Basketball Federation) Bitci Baskonia	29	
31	(Serbia) Vasilije Micić (3)	(Turkish Basketball Federation) Anadolu Efes	29	
31	(Cuba) Howard Sant-Roos	(Hellenic Basketball Federation) Panathinaikos	29	
32	(Bulgaria) Sasha Vezenkov (2)	(Hellenic Basketball Federation) Olympiacos	26	
33	(Turkey) Shane Larkin (3)	(Turkish Basketball Federation) Anadolu Efes	36	
34	(Greece) Georgios Papagiannis	(Hellenic Basketball Federation) Panathinaikos	31	

Playoffs

Round	Player	Team	PIR	Ref.
1	(Uganda) Brandon Davies (2)	(Spanish Basketball Federation) Barcelona	24	
2	(France) Vincent Poirier	(Spanish Basketball Federation) Real Madrid	31	
3	(Spain) Nikola Mirotić (3)	(Spanish Basketball Federation) Barcelona	31	
4	(Germany) Tibor Pleiß	(Turkish Basketball Federation) Anadolu Efes	37	
5	(Argentina) Nicolás Laprovíttola	(Spanish Basketball Federation) Barcelona	30	

=== MVP of the Month ===
Month	Round	Player	Team	Ref.
2021
October	1–7	(Spain) Nikola Mirotić	(Spanish Basketball Federation) Barcelona	
November	8–12	(Cape Verde) Edy Tavares	(Spanish Basketball Federation) Real Madrid	
December	13–18	(Spain) Nikola Mirotić (2)	(Spanish Basketball Federation) Barcelona	
2022
January	19–23	(France) Guerschon Yabusele	(Spanish Basketball Federation) Real Madrid	
February	24–27	(Bulgaria) Sasha Vezenkov	(Hellenic Basketball Federation) Olympiacos	
March	28–33	(United States) Mike James	(French Federation of Basketball) AS Monaco	
April	34–PO5	(Turkey) Shane Larkin	(Turkish Basketball Federation) Anadolu Efes	

== Statistics ==
=== Individual statistics ===
==== Rating ====
Rank	Name	Team	PIR
1.	(Spain) Nikola Mirotić	(Spain) Barcelona	20.1
2.	(Turkey) Shane Larkin	(Turkey) Anadolu Efes	18.7
3.	(Cape Verde) Edy Tavares	(Spain) Real Madrid	18.4

Source: EuroLeague

==== Points ====
Rank	Name	Team	PPG
1.	(Serbia) Vasilije Micić	(Turkey) Anadolu Efes	18.2
2.	(Spain) Nikola Mirotić	(Spain) Barcelona	16.9
3.	(United States) Mike James	(France) AS Monaco	16.4

Source: EuroLeague

==== Rebounds ====
Rank	Name	Team	RPG
1.	(Greece) Georgios Papagiannis	(Greece) Panathinaikos	8.2
2.	(Cape Verde) Edy Tavares	(Spain) Real Madrid	7.5
3.	(Italy) Nicolò Melli	(Italy) A|X Armani Exchange Milan	6.7

Source: EuroLeague

==== Assists ====
Rank	Name	Team	APG
1.	(Greece) Nick Calathes	(Spain) Barcelona	6.4
2.	(United States) Lorenzo Brown	(Russia) UNICS	6.1
3.	(United States) Mike James	(France) AS Monaco	5.8

Source: EuroLeague

==== Blocks ====
Rank	Name	Team	BPG
1.	(Greece) Georgios Papagiannis	(Greece) Panathinaikos	1.7
2.	(Cape Verde) Edy Tavares	(Spain) Real Madrid	1.7
3.	(United States) Donta Hall	(France) AS Monaco	1.1

Source: EuroLeague

==== Other statistics ====
Category	Player	Team	Average
Steals	(United States) John Brown	(Russia) UNICS	2.8
Turnovers	(France) Élie Okobo	(France) LDLC ASVEL	3.1
Fouls drawn	(United States) Mike James	(France) AS Monaco	5.1
Minutes	(Turkey) Shane Larkin	(Turkey) Anadolu Efes	31:53
FT %	(United States) Scottie Wilbekin	(Israel) Maccabi Tel Aviv	94.1%
2-Point %	(United States) Donta Hall	(France) AS Monaco	77.5%
3-Point %	(Italy) Marco Spissu	(Russia) UNICS	52.9%

=== Individual game highs ===
Category	Player	Team	Statistic	Opponent
Rating	(Spain) Nikola Mirotić	(Spain) Barcelona	39	(Spain) Real Madrid (19 May 2022)
Points	(United States) Scottie Wilbekin	(Israel) Maccabi Tel Aviv	37	(France) AS Monaco (17 Nov 2021)
Rebounds	(Greece) Georgios Papagiannis	(Greece) Panathinaikos	17	(Russia) UNICS (11 Nov 2021)
Assists	(United States) Mike James	(France) AS Monaco	14	(Lithuania) Žalgiris (15 Dec 2021)
Steals	(United States) John Brown	(Russia) UNICS	7	(Spain) Barcelona (20 Jan 2022)
Blocks	Four players		5	—

=== Team statistics ===
Category	Team	Average
Rating	(Turkey) Anadolu Efes	93.9
Points	(France) AS Monaco	83.4
Rebounds	(Spain) Real Madrid	38.3
Assists	(Spain) Barcelona	18.4
Steals	(Russia) UNICS	9.4
Blocks	(Spain) Real Madrid	3.3
Turnovers	(Germany) ALBA Berlin	13.7
FT %	(Turkey) Anadolu Efes	81.5%
2-Point %	(Greece) Olympiacos	58.1%
3-Point %	(Spain) Barcelona	40.1%

== Attendances ==
As of 21 May 2022

Pos	Team	Total	High	Low	Average	Change
1	Final Four in Belgrade	55,772	15,000	12,127	13,943	n/a
2	(Turkish Basketball Federation) Anadolu Efes	190,023	15,121	5,218	11,876	n/a
3	(Israeli Basketball Association) Maccabi Playtika Tel Aviv	126,440	10,360	0	8,429	n/a
4	(Lithuanian Basketball Federation) Žalgiris	106,830	12,686	4,863	7,630	n/a
5	(Hellenic Basketball Federation) Olympiacos	119,636	11,847	1,000	7,037	n/a
6	(Spanish Basketball Federation) Bitci Baskonia	96,391	8,218	5,426	6,885	n/a
7	(Basketball Federation of Serbia) Crvena zvezda mts	84,597	7,893	4,247	6,042	n/a
8	(Spanish Basketball Federation) Real Madrid	95,099	9,131	3,087	5,943	n/a
9	(Turkish Basketball Federation) Fenerbahçe Beko	77,640	12,133	1,892	5,545	n/a
10	(Spanish Basketball Federation) Barcelona	87,972	7,444	3,049	5,174	n/a
11	(Italian Basketball Federation) A|X Armani Exchange Milan	78,297	8,900	2,250	4,893	n/a
12	(French Federation of Basketball) LDLC ASVEL	59,327	5,461	2,000	4,237	n/a
13	(Hellenic Basketball Federation) Panathinaikos OPAP	54,364	11,852	951	3,883	n/a
14	(German Basketball Federation) ALBA Berlin	53,552	6,176	1,600	3,825	n/a
15	(French Federation of Basketball) AS Monaco	56,578	4,084	2,151	3,536	n/a
16	(German Basketball Federation) Bayern Munich	42,782	6,500	0	2,673	n/a
	League total	1,385,300	15,121	0	5,856	n/a

Source: Euroleague

== See also ==
- 2021–22 EuroCup Basketball
- 2021–22 Basketball Champions League
- 2021–22 FIBA Europe Cup
