= Christos Serelis =

Greek basketball coach

Christos Serelis Χρήστος Σερέλης
Personal information
- Born: August 21, 1974 (age 52) Lavrio, Greece
- Coaching career: 2003–present

Career history

Coaching
- 2003–2004: Lavrio (assistant)
- 2004–2022: Lavrio
- 2022: Panathinaikos (assistant)
- 2022–2023: Lavrio
- 2023: Panathinaikos
- 2023–2026: Panathinaikos (assistant)

Career highlights
- As head coach: Greek League Coach of the Year (2021); Greek 3rd Division champion (2010); Greek 4th Division champion (2007); As assistant coach: EuroLeague champion (2024); Greek League champion (2024); Greek Cup winner (2025)

Christos Serelis (Greek: Χρήστος Σερέλης; born August 21, 1974) is a Greek professional basketball coach who was most recently an assistant coach for Panathinaikos of the Greek Basketball League (GBL) and the EuroLeague, under head coach Ergin Ataman.

== Coaching career ==
Serelis became the head coach of the Greek club Lavrio in 2005. With Lavrio, he won the Greek 4th Division championship in 2007, and the Greek 3rd Division championship in 2010.

On April 14, 2022, he left Lavrio in order to join Panathinaikos, as an assistant of Giorgos Vovoras. After the end of the season, he became once again the head coach of Lavrio.

On February 21, 2023, Serelis returned to Panathinaikos to serve as the head coach for the remainder of the season, after the firing of Dejan Radonjić and the rest of his staff.

Following a period of internal challenges and inconsistent results in domestic and European leagues, Serelis returned to the assistant coach position. This change occurred upon the appointment of Ergin Ataman- at then three-time EuroLeague winner- as the club's new head coach, ahead of the 2023–2024 season.
