= Soulis Markopoulos =

Greek basketball player and coach (1949–2026)

Soulis Markopoulos Σούλης Μαρκόπουλος
Personal information
- Born: 1 March 1949 Thessaloniki, Greece
- Died: 25 September 2026 (aged 77) Thessaloniki, Greece

Career information
- Playing career: 1967–1978
- Position: Head Coach
- Coaching career: 1978–2019

Career history

Playing
- 1967–1972: Olympos Saranta Ekklision
- 1972–1978: Dimokritos Thessaloniki

Coaching
- 1978–1987: Dimokritos Thessaloniki
- 1987–1990: Iraklis Thessaloniki
- 1993: PAOK Thessaloniki (assistant)
- 1993–1994: PAOK Thessaloniki
- 1994–1996: Aris Thessaloniki
- 1998–1999: Aris Thessaloniki
- 2000–2001: Makedonikos
- 2002–2003: Makedonikos
- 2005–2006: PAOK Thessaloniki
- 2007: AEK Athens
- 2007–2009: Maroussi Athens
- 2009–2017: PAOK Thessaloniki
- 2019: Aris Thessaloniki

Career highlights
- As head coach: FIBA Korać Cup champion (1994); 2× Greek League Coach of the Year (2008, 2014); Greek League Hall of Fame (2023)

Anastasios "Soulis" Markopoulos (Greek: Ἀναστάσιος "Σούλης" Μαρκόπουλος; 1 March 1949 – 25 September 2026) was a Greek professional basketball player and coach. As of 2026, he holds the all-time record for the most total games as a head coach, in the history of the Greek Championship. Markopoulos was inducted into the Greek Basket League Hall of Fame in 2023.

== Playing career ==
Markopoulos played club basketball with the Greek club Olympos Saranta Ekklision, from 1967 to 1972. He then played with the Greek club Dimokritos Thessaloniki, from 1972 to 1978. While he was with Dimokritos, he played multiple seasons in the top-tier level Greek Basket League.

== Coaching career ==
Markopoulos coached, in his career, teams such as: Iraklis Thessaloniki, PAOK Thessaloniki, Aris Thessaloniki, Makedonikos, AEK Athens, and Maroussi Athens. His most remarkable success was the acquisition of the FIBA Korać Cup title, while with PAOK, in the 1993–94 season. In the Greek Basket League 2007–08 season, while coaching Maroussi, and qualifying to the semifinals of the Greek Basket League, he was voted the Greek League Best Coach.

He was also named the Greek League Best Coach in 2014. In the summer of 2014, he extended his contract with PAOK through the 2018–19 season. On 26 May 2017, PAOK announced the end of their cooperation with Markopoulos working as the club's head coach.

== Personal life and death ==
Markopoulos' son, Charis, is also a professional basketball coach, and former professional basketball player.

Soulis Markopoulos died on 25 September 2026, at the age of 77.
