= Loux (company) =

Greek beverage company

- Company type: Incorporated
- Industry: Soft drinks
- Founded: 1950
- Founder: Panagiotis Marlafekas
- Headquarters: Patras, Greece
- Area served: Europe, United States, Middle East
- Key people: Ioannis Marlafekas (President)
- Products: Soft drinks
- Revenue: ▲€33.24 million (2017)
- Net income: ▲€2.21 million (2017)
- Number of employees: 350 (2015)
- Website: www.loux.gr/en/

Loux (Greek: Λουξ) is the name of a Greek beverage (non alcoholic) company based in the city of Patras. It was founded in 1950.

It produces various beverages and natural juices and exports also to Cyprus, Italy, Australia, New Zealand, Canada, Germany and the United States.

== Sources ==
- Loux is recognized as one of the “Strongest Companies in Greece” by ICAP Group
- Export Leaders
