= Dimitrios Priftis =

Greek basketball player and coach

Dimitris Priftis Δημήτρης Πρίφτης
Pallacanestro Reggiana
- Position: Head coach
- League: LBA

Personal information
- Born: 27 October 1968 (age 58) Athens, Greece

Career history

Coaching
- 1998–2000: Esperides Kallitheas women's team
- 2001–2002: Dafni (assistant)
- 2002–2003: Ionikos Nikaias (assistant)
- 2003–2009: AEK (assistant)
- 2008–2012: Greece (assistant)
- 2009–2010: Aris (assistant)
- 2010–2012: Kavala
- 2012–2013: Ikaros Kallitheas
- 2013–2014: Kolossos Rodou
- 2014: Panathinaikos (assistant)
- 2014–2017: Greece (assistant)
- 2014–2017: Aris Thessaloniki
- 2017–2021: UNICS Kazan
- 2021–2022: Panathinaikos
- 2022–2023: Tofaş
- 2023–present: Reggiana

Career highlights
- Greek Super Cup winner (2021); Lega Serie A Coach of the Year (2026); Greek League Coach of the Year (2016)

Dimitrios Priftis (Greek: Δημήτρης Πρίφτης; born 27 October 1968) is a Greek professional basketball coach who serves as the head coach for Pallacanestro Reggiana of the Lega Basket Serie A (LBA).

== Club coaching career ==
After having previously worked as the head coach of Kavala and Ikaros Kallitheas, Prifitis became the head coach of Kolossos Rodou in 2013.

He was hired as an assistant coach at Panathinaikos in 2014. He then became the head coach of Aris later that same year. He was named the Greek League Best Coach in 2016.

He became the head coach of the Russian VTB United League club, UNICS Kazan, in 2017.

On 26 June 2021 he became the head coach of Panathinaikos, signing a three-year deal with the "Greens". On 12 April 2022 Priftis was fired from his position, after a series of negative results and a catastrophic season in the EuroLeague.

On 16 June 2022 he signed with Tofaş of the Turkish Basketbol Süper Ligi.

On 19 June 2023 he signed with Pallacanestro Reggiana of the LBA. He immediately led his team to the semifinals of the Italian cup and the semifinals of the Italian league winning the right his team to participate the next season to the European Champions league and making the club renew his contract until 2026.

== National team career ==
Priftis has also worked as an assistant coach of the senior men's Greek national basketball team between 2008 and 2012, and from 2014 to the present. He has worked as an assistant coach with Greece at the following tournaments: the 2008 FIBA World Olympic Qualifying Tournament, the 2008 Summer Olympics, the EuroBasket 2009, the 2010 FIBA World Championship, the EuroBasket 2011, the 2012 FIBA World Olympic Qualifying Tournament, the 2014 FIBA Basketball World Cup, the EuroBasket 2015, and the 2016 Turin FIBA World Olympic Qualifying Tournament.

== Continental coaching record ==
Legend
G	Games coached	W	Games won	L	Games lost	W–L %	Win-loss %

Note: The EuroLeague is not the only competition in which the team played during the season. He also coached in domestic competition, and regional competition if applicable.

=== EuroLeague ===
Team	Year	G	W	L	W–L%	Result
Panathinaikos	2021–22	28	9	19	.321	Eliminated in the regular season
Career		28	9	19	.321	
